= Nahariyya Natural Region =

Coordinates: 33°00′21″N 35°5′56″E

Nahariya Natural Region
- Natural Region
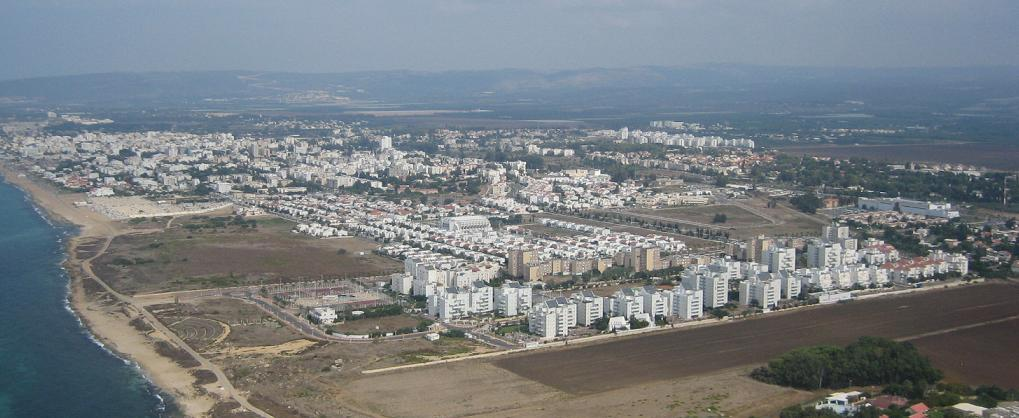
- View of Nahariya
- Interactive map of Nahariya Natural Region
- Country: Israel
- District: Northern
- Subdistrict: Acre
- Largest City: Nahariya

Area
  - Total: 101 km^{2} (39 sq mi)

Population (2024)
  - Total: 119,958

Ethnicity
  - Jews and others: 73.2%
  - Arabs: 25.8%

The Nahariya Natural Region, alternatively spelt as Nahariyya Natural Region, is a natural region in the Acre Subdistrict, in the Northern District of Israel. Nahariya is the largest city in the natural region.

== Geography ==
Districts, Subdistricts and Natural Regions of the State of Israel, 2018

The natural region is the northernmost in Israel along the Mediterranean coast, north of Acre and south of the border with Lebanon. It has an area of 101 km^{2}. Approximately 57 percent of the natural region's inhabitants live in Nahariya. Other major population centers in the natural region are the mixed-religion Arab towns of Abu Snan and Kafr Yasif, and the Jewish town of Shlomi. It contains a portion of the Mateh Asher Regional Council.

== Demographics ==
The natural region is roughly three-quarters Jewish and one quarter Arab. Nahariya and Shlomi are inhabited by Jews, while the natural region contains three Arab towns - Abu Snan, Kafr Yasif, and Mazra'a.

Historical population
Year	Pop.	±%
1972	39,500	—
1983	49,000	+24.1%
1995	65,500	+33.7%
2008	91,720	+40.0%
2022	113,533	+23.8%
2024	119,958	+5.7%

== Administrative local authorities ==
Cities	Local Councils	Villages
Nahariyya	Abu Sinan; Kafr Yasif; Mazra'a; Shlomi	Matte Asher: Amka; Beit HaEmek; Ben Ami; Betzet; Evron; Gesher HaZiv; Kabri; Liman; Lohamei HaGeta'ot; Nes Ammim; Netiv HaShayara; Oshrat; Regba; Rosh HaNikra; Sa'ar; Shavei Zion

== Voting patterns ==
In the 2022 election, 44 percent voted for the parties of the right-wing coalition led by Benjamin Netanyahu, while 37 percent voted for the parties of the center-left coalition led by Yair Lapid and 19 percent of voters in the natural region voted for the Arab parties.

In the 2026 election, 38 percent of voters in the natural region voted for the parties of the right-wing coalition led by Benjamin Netanyahu, while 37 percent voted for the parties of the center-left coalition led by Gadi Eisenkot and 20 percent voted for the Arab parties. An additional 2.7 percent voted for the Reservists, and 1.7 percent voted for Amcha Yisrael. Voter turnout increased 25 percent from the 2022 election.
