= Arab al-Aramshe =

Bedouin village in northern Israel

Arab al-Aramshe: עַרַבּ אל-עַרָמִשָׁה (Hebrew); عرب العرامشة (Arabic)

Hebrew transcription(s)
  - Standard: Arab al-Aramisha
  - Official: Aramisha, Aramsha
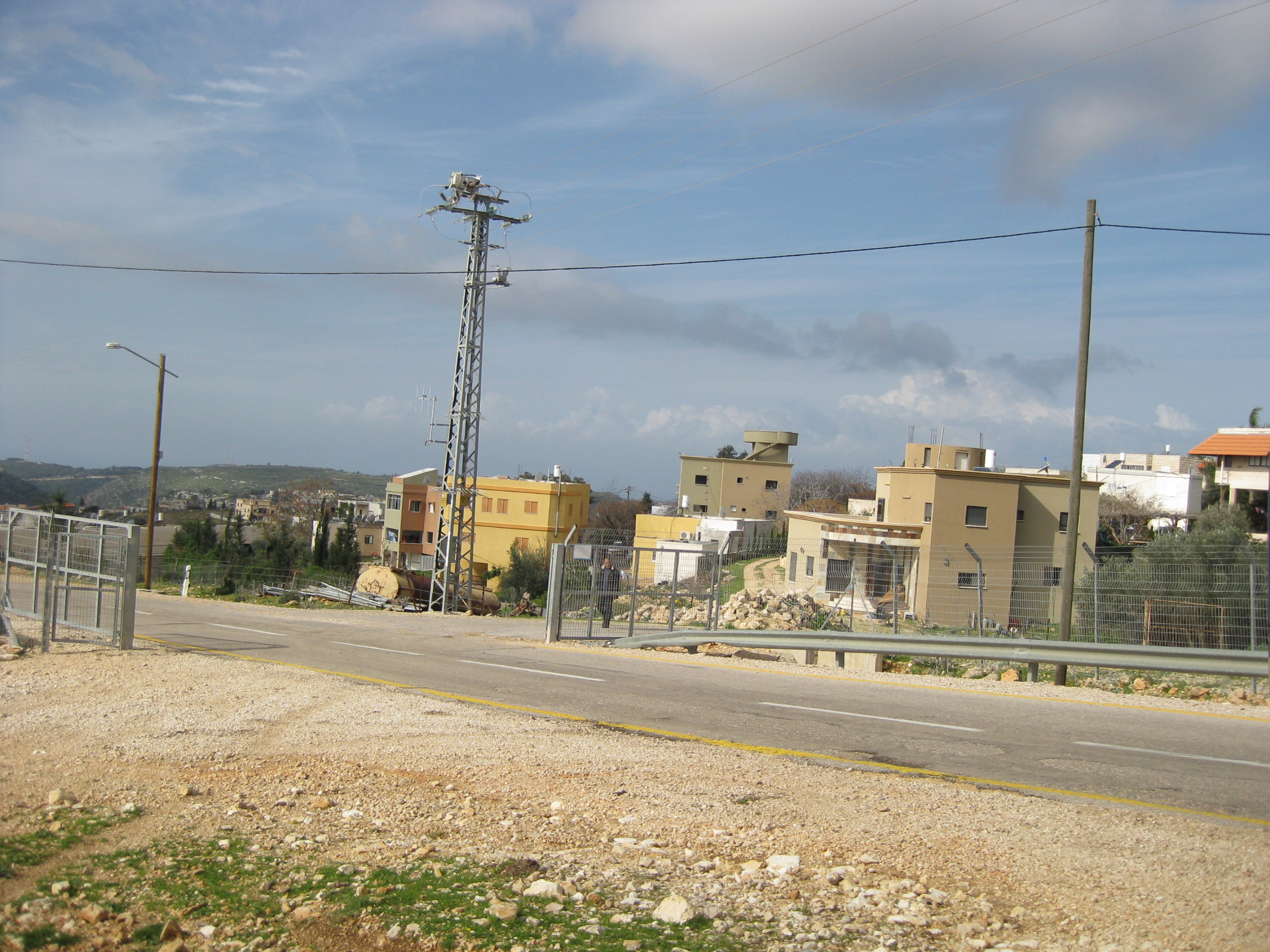

- Location within Northwest Israel Location within Israel
- Coordinates: 33°5′24″N 35°13′43″E
- Country: Israel
- District: Northern
- Subdistrict: Acre
- Council: Mateh Asher
- Population (2024): 1,773

Arab al-Aramshe officially Aramsha (Hebrew: עַרָמִשָׁה, עראמשה), is a Bedouin village located in the Western Galilee region of northern Israel, straddling the Israel–Lebanon border, approximately five kilometers south of the Lebanese border fence. The village also falls under the jurisdiction of the Mateh Asher Regional Council.

It developed from a settlement into a permanent village in the late 1950s and is primarily inhabited by members of the Bedouin al-Aramshe tribe, who historically roamed the border region between Lebanon and Palestine during the Ottoman era. The tribe’s lands were divided by the 1916 Sykes-Picot Agreement and later by the armistice and Blue Lines, with some members residing on both sides of the border. The village economy has transitioned from traditional herding to employment primarily in nearby towns and kibbutzim.

== History ==
=== British Mandate ===
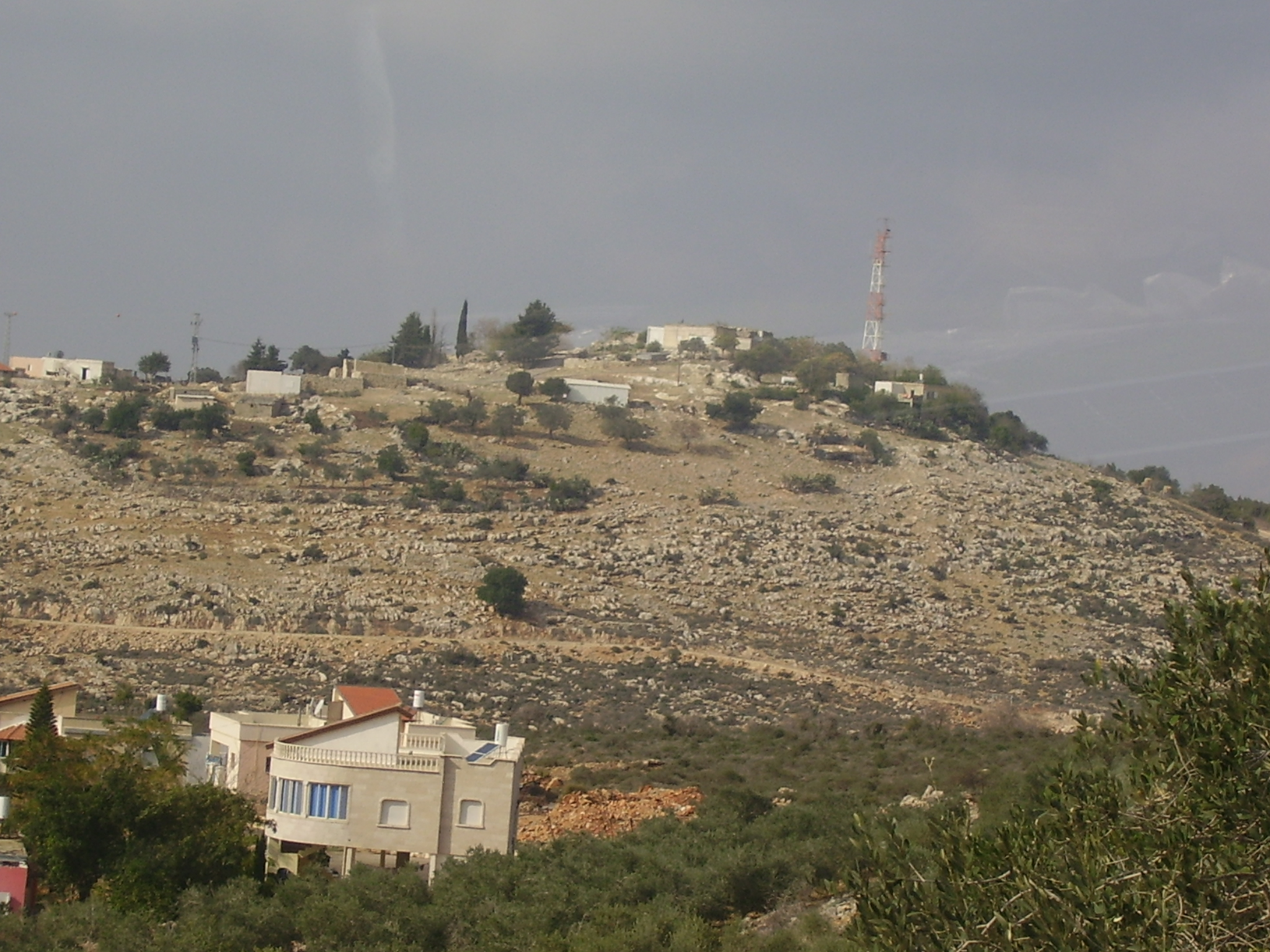
Jordiyyah hill in Arab al Aramsha village.

In its early years prior to the War of Independence, the village was called "Mazra'a" (Arabic: مزرعة), meaning "Farm". According to Israeli-historians and journalists, members of the Bedouin al-Aramshe tribe originally inhabited what is now the Israel–Lebanon border region, where they roamed freely with their flocks over the hills during the Ottoman Empire. According to MTV Lebanon, the tribe’s members lived in places called Jordiyyah, Nuwakir, and the area called Khirbet Adamit, now known as Adamit, which was established in August 1958 by Jewish settlers. The tribe members were expelled in the late 1970s and early 1980s. Although old houses still stand near the site of Adamit, those in Jordiyyah and Nuwakir were destroyed. Eventually, the tribe settled in Jordiyyah, a land across the northern border of Palestine, and in Dhahira, in southernmost Lebanon. These two areas were originally one contiguous region, but were divided by the 1916 Sykes-Picot Agreement. Later, the armistice line and the Blue Line further split the area: one part came under Israeli control after 1948, while Dhahira remained in Lebanese territory, though both sides are inhabited by members of the tribe.

In June 1938, Orde Wingate's Special Night Squads raided part of the village, named Jordiyyah, where an armed group was stationed, killing two of its members. Following this incident, tribe members made a peace agreement with the neighbors in Hanita. Jewish settlers including Dov Yermiya who served as mukhtar of Hanita and the surrounding area, developed relations with tribe members, which led them to refrain from participating in battles against Jews.

=== Israel ===
==== 20th century ====
After the 1948 Arab-Israeli War, approximately 400 tribe members remained in Israel. They were displaced among several villages: Khirbet Admit, located north of Admit kibbutz; Juraida, situated directly on the border with Lebanon (partly within Lebanese territory); and al-Nuqayr between them. Tribe members were not included in the 1949 Israeli population census, "which was a government operation to register all residents of the era, taking place on November 8, 1948, during the War of Independence. Some of them later received Israeli identity cards four years afterward. During Israel's first decade, the tribe lived largely autonomously, maintaining minimal contact with Israeli authorities while keeping strong ties with relatives in Lebanon. It is alleged that they were heavily involved in smuggling activities، and paid taxes to the Lebanese government. In 1954, the area was declared a closed military zone requiring the IDF Chief of Staff's permission for entry.

In February 1955, a tribe member was allegedly wounded by gunfire from across the Lebanese border. In March 1956, another tribe member was shot. Initially, it was believed that the shooters had come from Lebanon, but following a police investigation, several tribesmen were arrested in Israel. In June 1956, operatives from Lebanon blew up three houses belonging to tribe members in Israel. Press reports attributed the explosions to intra-tribal conflict between Israeli and Lebanese factions of the tribe. In early August 1956, reports indicated 70 tribe members left for Lebanon, continuing an earlier wave of emigration that had already seen about 100 members depart.

In 1957, following the construction of Highway 8993, a highway in western Upper Galilee, the tribe established connections with neighboring settlements and began selling their livestock's organic manure there. Additionally, many tribe members began working as wage laborers in the area. In 1959, tribe members voted for the first time in Knesset elections.

Initially, the area was a settlement and later became a permanent village for Israeli members of the Bedouin Arab al-Aramshe tribe following the construction of the access road to Adamit in the late 1950s. As reported the authorities expropriated the residents' old homes and relocated them to new houses in the new settlement. The transfer of tribe members to the settlement continued throughout the 1960s. In 1962, reported that several tribe members were arrested as suspects in espionage. Additional arrests were made in 1972.

In early 1963, Arab al-Aramshe was added to the Sulam Tzur Regional Council, which was a regional council in the Western Galilee, established in 1950 and dissolved in 1982 with the formation of the Mateh Asher Regional Council. In October 1963, many of the restrictions of the Military Administration over Arab Israelis were lifted nationwide, but remained in effect in the village, which was considered remote from Arab population centers and therefore required special supervision.

In 1965, a shepherd named Abed al-Hamid reportedly killed what was believed to be the last leopard in Galilee with his bare hands. He died in 1997, and the leopard is said to be on display at the museum in nearby Kibbutz Hanita.

In the mid-1980s, most residents lived along the border itself. For security reasons, Israel decided to move them away. Most agreed to relocate, while a few families chose to remain. The homes of those who left were demolished to prevent their return. Today, the Aramshe quarter is the heart of the village and it contains a school, a clinic, bus stops, and a kiosk that also serves as a bridal salon. The road from Aramshe to Jordiyyah takes about ten minutes, winding along the fence with views of southern Lebanon.

In 1993, the village had about a thousand residents.

==== 21st century ====
In the past, villagers on the Israeli side could speak with and visit relatives in Lebanon. But after the withdrawal from Lebanon in 2000, the zone that had allowed this contact disappeared. Today, ties between the two sides are maintained mostly by phone and social media. In 2006, during the Second Lebanon War, a rocket killed a mother and two daughters from the Juma’a family. After that, bomb shelters were built next to most homes.

On 17 April 2024, as part of Hezbollah's attacks on the north during Gaza war, the village's community center building was hit, wounding 13 IDF soldiers from Etzioni Brigade, two members of the rapid response team, and three civilians. The attack was carried out using a combination of anti-tank missiles, rockets, and two suicide drones, with Hezbollah claiming responsibility. On April 21, 2024, an IDF spokesman authorized the publication that Major (res.) Dor Zimel, deputy commander of the Etzioni Brigade, died of his wounds after being injured as a result of the drone attack on April 17, 2024.

== Geography ==
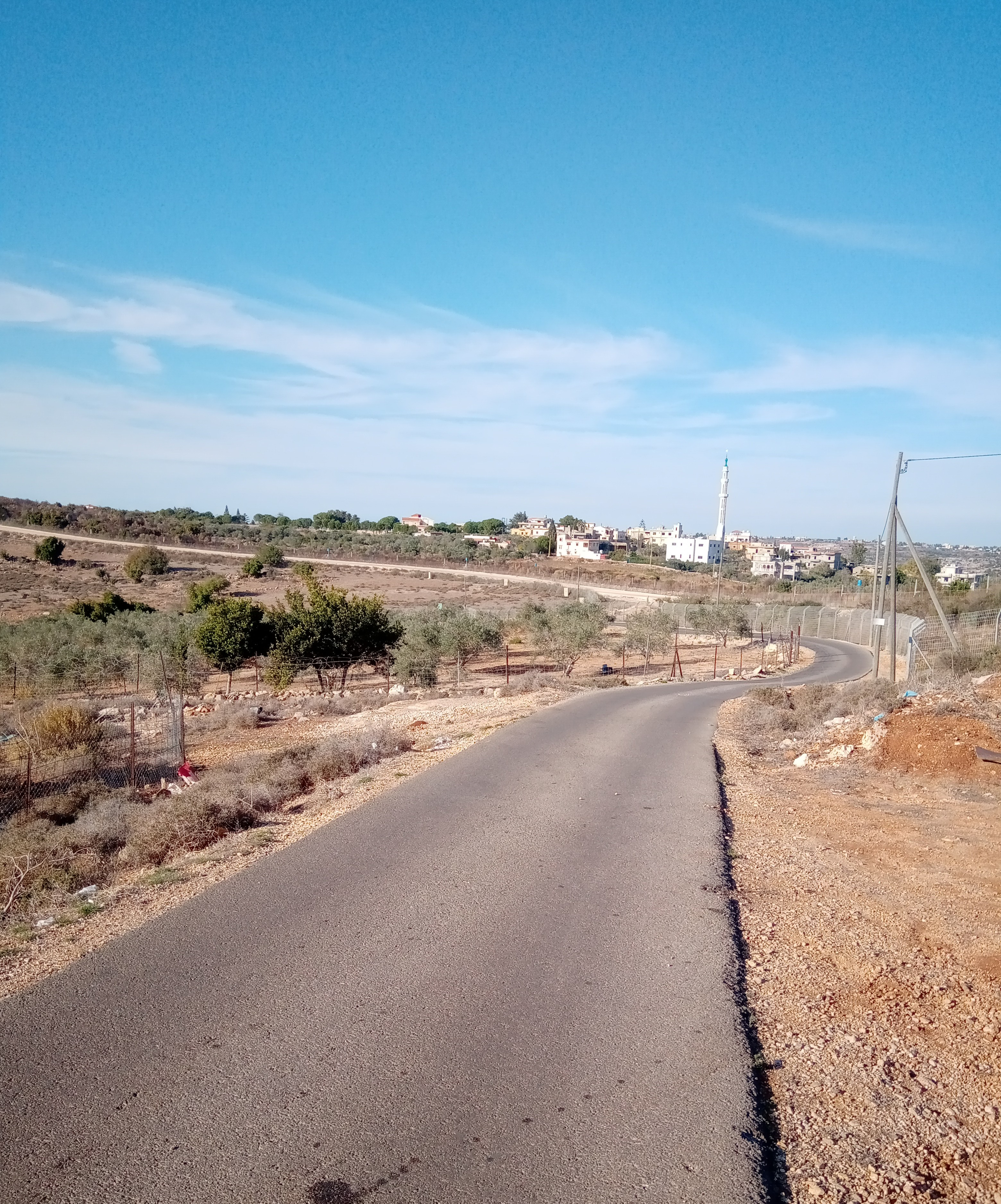
A road in the village near the Lebanese border

Arab al-Aramshe is a Bedouin village in the Western Galilee, near Israel’s northern border and part of the Mateh Asher Regional Council. It lies less than five kilometers from Lebanon border and straddles the Israel-Lebanon border, with some residents living in Israel and some on the Lebanese side. The village landscape, characterized by "rocky outcrops dotted with sparse Galilean vegetation,is isolated, appearing exposed and quiet. It has about 1,600 residents, nearly all of whom live in the Aramshe neighborhood, on the hill of the same name. Others live on the Jordiyyah and Nuwakar hills, situated right next to the border fence.

Despite the peaceful surroundings, no tourism projects have succeeded in the village. Attempts to open guest houses and restaurants failed due to lack of funding, limited means among the villagers, and the village's location on the border. Unlike in previous years, traditional herding is now rare, with only a few families raising cattle or sheep. As a result, most residents work outside the village, especially in the packing houses and factories of nearby kibbutzim—Hanita and Adamit. As those kibbutzim shut down factories, many villagers were forced to seek work farther away, in cities like Nahariya, Acre, and Haifa. As of 2024, it was reported that the village has no industry, and most of its 1,763 residents work outside the village.

== See also ==
- Arab localities in Israel
- Bedouin in Israel
