= Abu Snan =

Arab village in northern Israel

Abu Snan: אַבּוּ סְנָאן, אַבּוּ סִינַאן; أبو سنان , أبو سنان
- Local council (from 1964)

Hebrew transcription(s)
  - ISO 259: ʔabu-Snaˀn
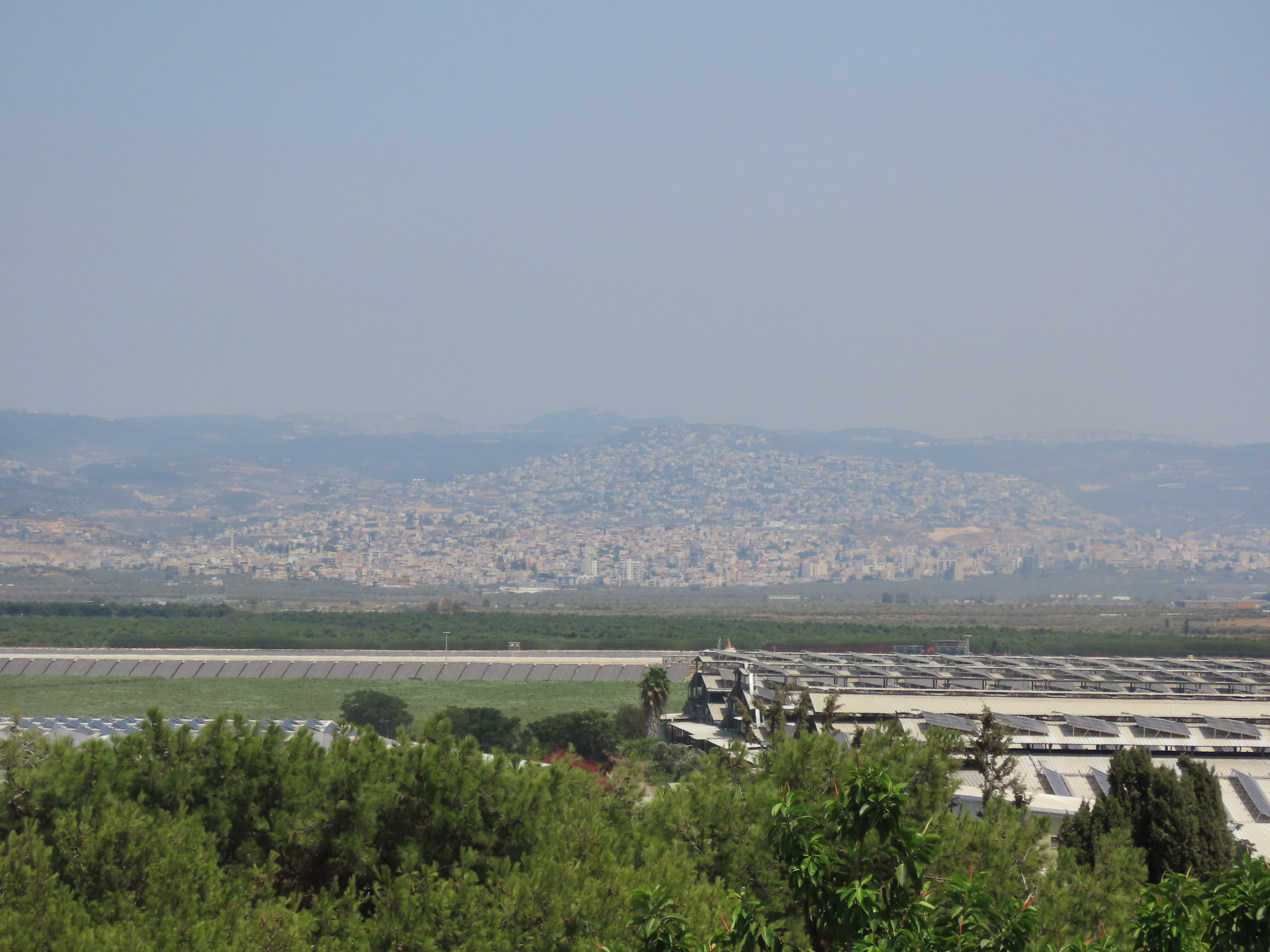
- Skyline of Abu Snan, 2025

- Location within Northwest Israel
- Coordinates: 32°57′N 35°10′E
- Grid position: 166/262 PAL
- Country: Israel
- District: Northern
- Subdistrict: Acre
- Natural Region: Nahariya

Area
  - Total: 4,750 dunams (4.75 km^{2}; 1.83 sq mi)

Population (2024)
  - Total: 14,542
  - Density: 3,060/km^{2} (7,930/sq mi)
- Name meaning: "Produsing pasturage, especially such plants as "sorrel""

Abu Snan (Arabic: أبو سنان, romanized: Abū Sinān, Hebrew: אַבּוּ סְנָן) is an Arab village and locality in the Galilee, part of the Northern District of Israel. With an area of 4,750 dunams (4.75 km²). It acquired recognition as an independent local council in 1964. It is a religiously-mixed village of Arabs, with a Muslim majority, along with sizable Druze and Arab-Christian minorities. According to the Israel Central Bureau of Statistics (CBS), in 2024 Abu Snan had a total population of 14,542. In 2022, 54.9% of the population was Muslim, 30.3% was Druze and 14.8% was Christian.

== History ==
Abu Snan is an ancient village site, where old dressed stones have been reused in modern houses. Graves, oil or vine-presses, and cisterns have been found cut in rock.

=== Crusaders ===
In about 1250 Abu Snan is noted as a casale of the Teutonic Knights, called Busnen. Under the name Tusyan, probably a corruption of Busenan, Abu Snan was mentioned as part of the domain of the Crusaders during the hudna between the Crusaders based in Acre and the Mamluk sultan Qalawun declared in 1283. No Crusader remains have yet been identified in the village.

=== Ottoman Empire ===
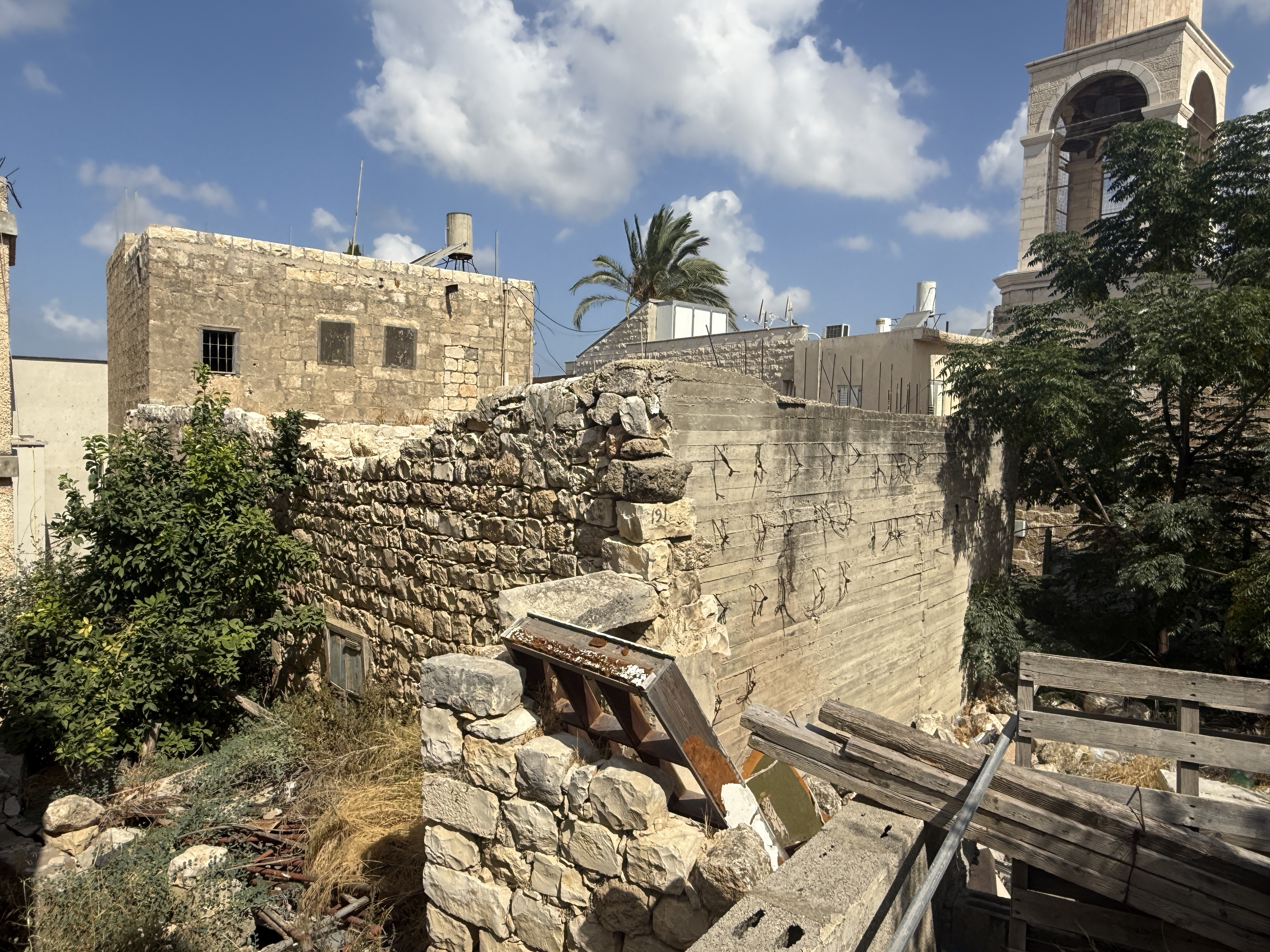
Remains of Ottoman-era structures in Abu Snan

In 1517, Abu Snan was with the rest of Palestine incorporated into the Ottoman Empire after it was captured from the Mamluks, and by 1548–1549 or 1596, it appeared in the Ottoman tax registers as part of the Nahiya of Acre of the Liwa of Safed. It had a population of 102 households and 3 bachelors, all Muslims. The villagers paid taxes on wheat, barley, olive trees, sesame, cotton, goats and beehives, in addition to "occasional revenues"; a total of 7,600 akçe.

Abu Snan was among several cotton-growing villages in the Sahil Akka (plain of Acre) muqata'a (fiscal district) under the control of local tax farmer Sheikh Najm in the first decade of the 18th century. The village is later mentioned as a dependency of the Jiddin fortress under Najm's relative Ahmad ibn Husayn and came under the control of another local strongman, Daher al-Umar, when he captured Jiddin in 1738. The Italian traveler Giovanni Mariti visited the area in 1761 and noted Abu Sinan produced "an abundance of cotton". After Daher was eliminated by the Ottomans in 1775 and Ahmad Pasha al-Jazzar was appointed governor in Acre, Abu Snan was one of the main fortified villages held by Daher's son Ali. In 1776, the village's men took part in Ali's abortive raid against al-Jazzar's forces at Amqa. Al-Jazzar's forces afterward attacked and subdued Abu Sinan before proceeding against Ali's other strongholds.

A map by Pierre Jacotin from Napoleon's invasion of 1799 showed the place, named as Abou Senan. When French explorer Victor Guérin visited the village in 1875, he estimated the population of Abu Snan to be 400, of whom 260 were Druzes and 140 Greek Orthodox Christians. Guérin also wrote that based on the rock-cut cisterns and old cut-stones incorporated in the buildings, it was an ancient place. Fragments from an older building were used in a chapel for St. George.

In 1881, the Palestine Exploration Fund's Survey of Western Palestine described Abu Snan as a stone-built village situated on the low hill near the plain, surrounded by olive groves and arable land, and with many cisterns of rainwater. The population consisted of 150 Christians and 100 Muslims.

A population list from about 1887 showed that Abu Snan had about 565 inhabitants; two thirds Druze, one third Greek Catholic Christians.

=== British Mandate ===
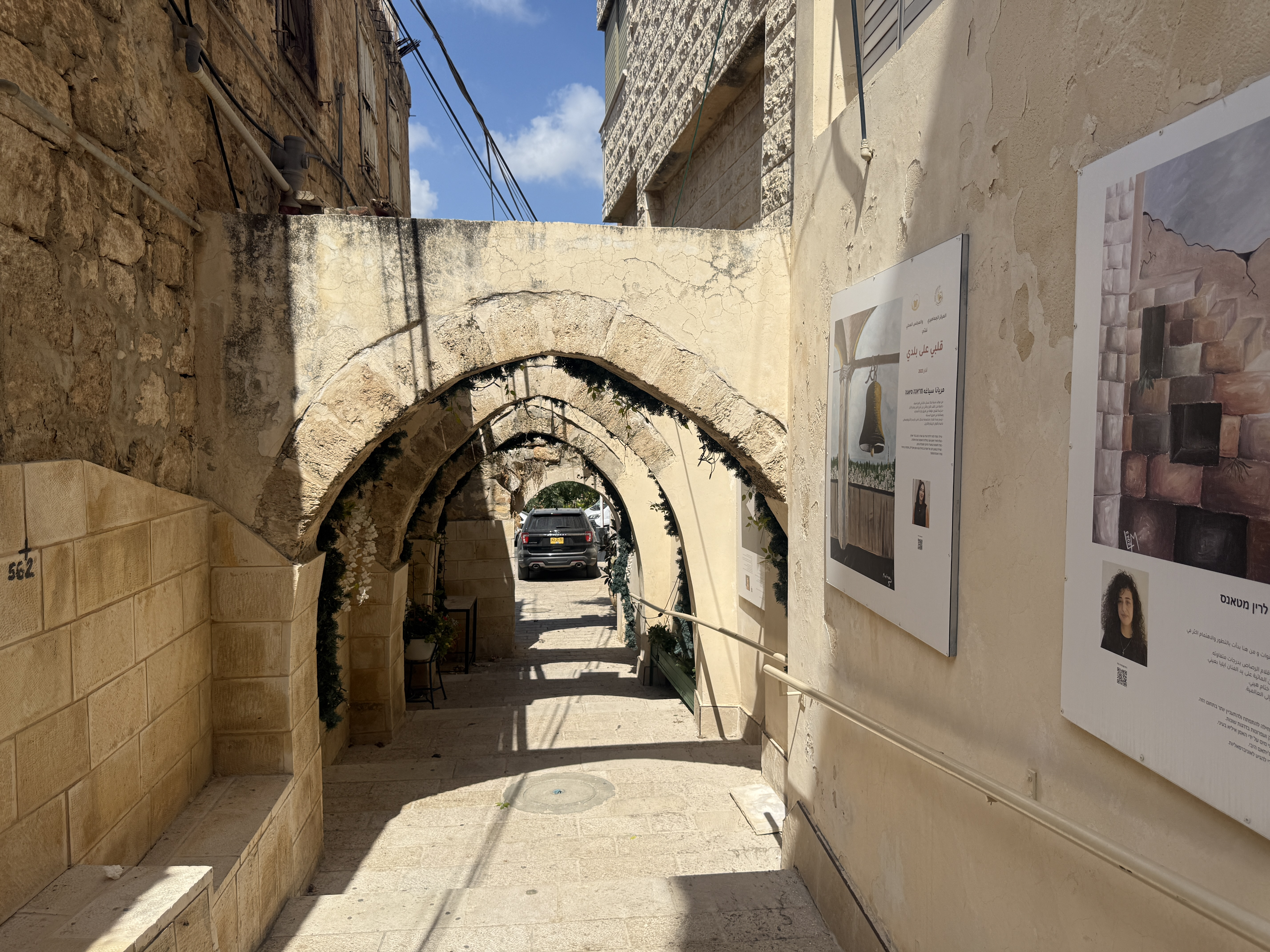
Arcaded alley in old village of Abu Snan

In the 1922 census of Palestine, conducted by the British Mandate authorities, Abu Snan had a total population of 518. Of these, 43 were Muslim, 228 Druzes and 247 Christians. Of Abu Snan's 247 Christians, 196 were Orthodox, 44 Roman Catholics, and 4 Melkites and 3 Maronites. In the 1931 census it had increased to a population of 605, in 102 inhabited houses. Of these, 20 were Muslim, 274 Christians, and 311 Druzes.

In the 1945 statistics the population of Abu Snan was 820; 30 Muslims, 380 Christians and 410 other Arabs, and the land area was a total of 13,043 dunams, according to an official land and population survey. 2,172 dunams were plantations and irrigable land, 7,933 used for cereals, while 69 dunams were built-up (urban) land.

=== Israel ===
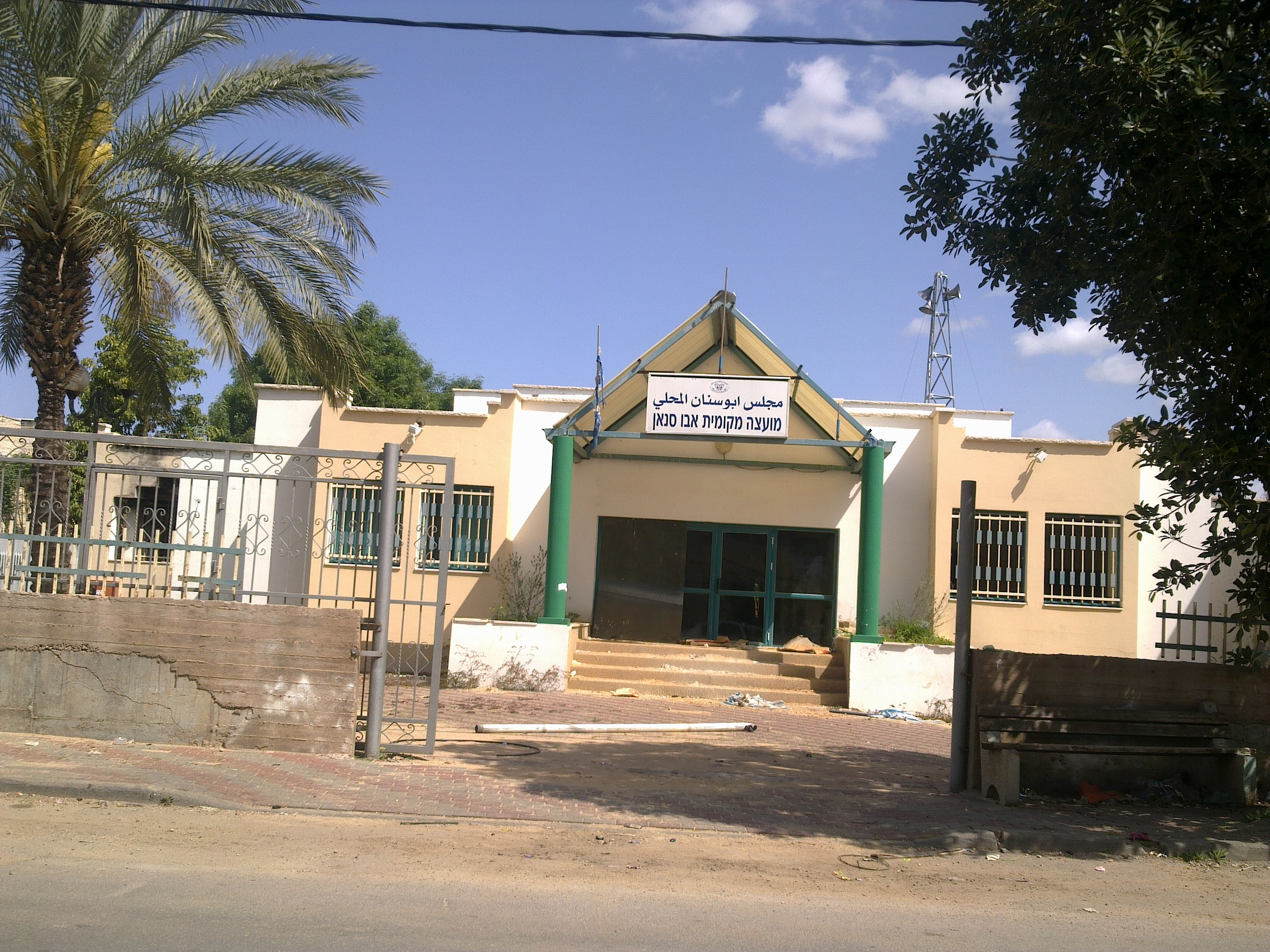
Abu Snan local council building

In 2003 the local council was merged with its neighboring towns. The next year this was undone.

== Demographics ==
Historical population
Year	Pop.	±%
1972	3,400	—
1983	6,000	+76.5%
1995	9,000	+50.0%
2008	12,200	+35.6%
2022	13,895	+13.9%
2024	14,543	+4.7%

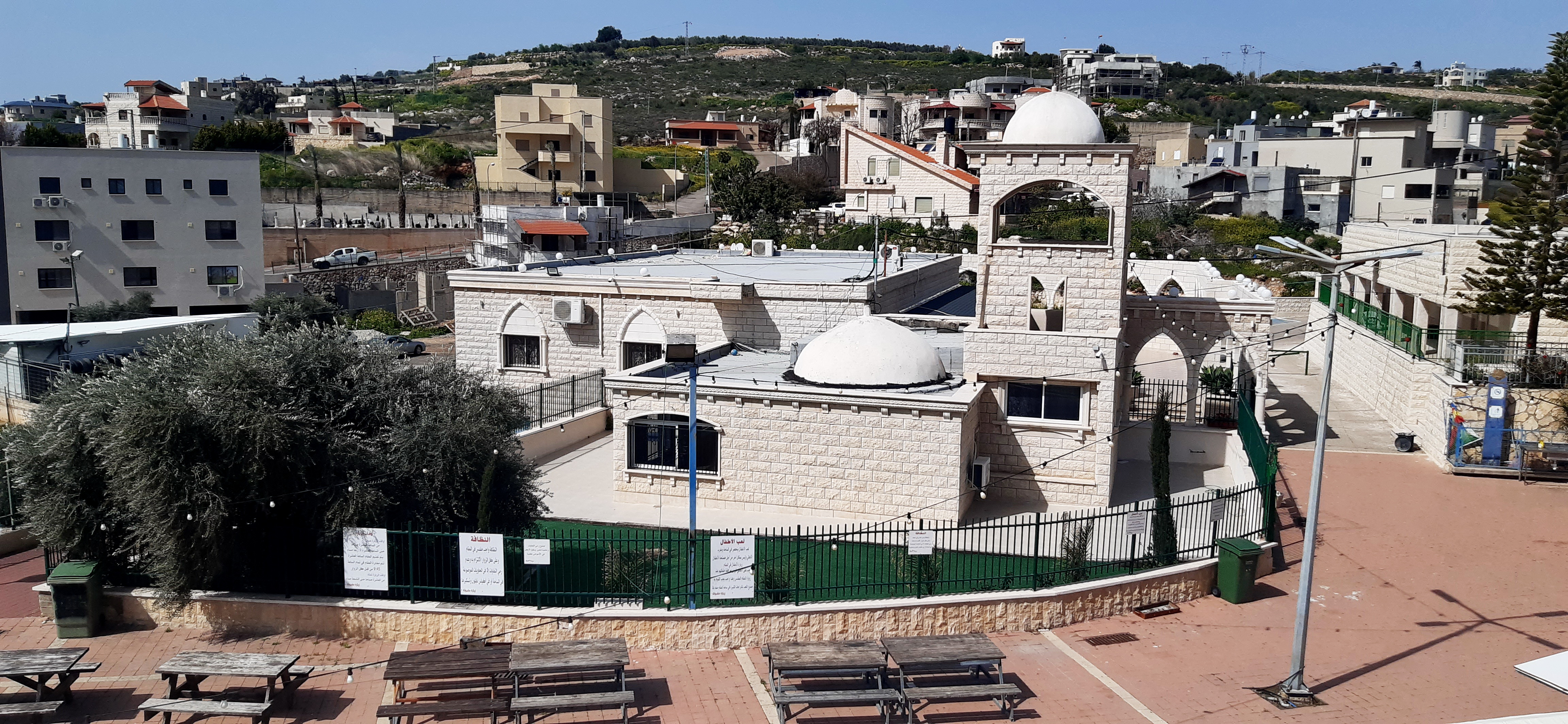
Druze shrine of Zakariya in Abu Snan

Abu Snan had a population of 13,000 (2014), 7,000 of whom are Muslim, 4,000 Druze, and 2,000 Christian.

== Voting Patterns ==
In the 2022 election, 72 percent of voters in Abu Snan voted for the Arab parties, while 19 percent voted for the parties of the parties of the center-left coalition led by Yair Lapid and 8 percent voted for the right-wing coalition led by Benjamin Netanyahu.

In the 2026 election, the pattern was the same: 72 percent of voters in Abu Snan voted for the Arab parties, while 19 percent voted for the parties of the center-left coalition led by Gadi Eisenkot and 8 percent voted for the parties of the right-wing coalition led by Benjamin Netanyahu. Among the voters for the Arab parties, 70 percent voted for the Joint List, while 30 percent voted for Ra'am. Voter turnout increased 47 percent from the 2022 election.

== Notable residents ==
- Ashraf Brik
- Yusef Mishleb

== See also ==
- Arab localities in Israel
- Druze in Israel

== Bibliography ==
- Av‘iam, Mordechai (1996). "Abu Sinan". Hadashot Arkheologiyot – Excavations and Surveys in Israel (15).
- Barag, Dan (1979). "A new source concerning the ultimate borders of the Latin Kingdom of Jerusalem". Israel Exploration Journal. 29: 197–217.
- Barron, J. B., ed. (1923). Palestine: Report and General Abstracts of the Census of 1922. Government of Palestine.
- Cohen, Amnon (1973). Palestine in the 18th Century: Patterns of Government and Administration. Jerusalem: The Magnes Press. ISBN 978-0-19-647903-3.
- Conder, C.R.; Kitchener, H.H. (1881). The Survey of Western Palestine: Memoirs of the Topography, Orography, Hydrography, and Archaeology. Vol. 1. London: Committee of the Palestine Exploration Fund.
- Dauphin, C. (1998). La Palestine byzantine, Peuplement et Populations. BAR International Series 726 (in French). Vol. III : Catalogue. Oxford: Archeopress. ISBN 0-860549-05-4.
- Department of Statistics (1945). Village Statistics, April, 1945. Government of Palestine.
- Guérin, V. (1880). Description Géographique Historique et Archéologique de la Palestine (in French). Vol. 3: Galilee, pt. 2. Paris: L'Imprimerie Nationale.
- Hadawi, S. (1970). Village Statistics of 1945: A Classification of Land and Area ownership in Palestine. Palestine Liberation Organization Research Center. Archived from the original on 8 December 2018.
- Hütteroth, W.-D.; Abdulfattah, K. (1977). Historical Geography of Palestine, Transjordan and Southern Syria in the Late 16th Century. Erlanger Geographische Arbeiten, Sonderband 5. Erlangen, Germany: Vorstand der Fränkischen Geographischen Gesellschaft. ISBN 3-920405-41-2.
- Joudah, Ahmad Hasan (2013). Revolt in Palestine in the Eighteenth Century: The Era of Shaykh Zahir al-Umar (Second ed.). Gorgias Press. ISBN 978-1-4632-0002-2.
- Karmon, Y. (1960). "An Analysis of Jacotin's Map of Palestine" (PDF). Israel Exploration Journal. 10 (3, 4): 155–173, 244–253. Archived from the original (PDF) on 22 December 2019.
- Mariti, G. (1792). Travels Through Cyprus, Syria, and Palestine; with a General History of the Levant, volume 1. Dublin: P. Byrne.
- Mills, E., ed. (1932). Census of Palestine 1931. Population of Villages, Towns and Administrative Areas. Jerusalem: Government of Palestine.
- Palmer, E.H. (1881). The Survey of Western Palestine: Arabic and English Name Lists Collected During the Survey by Lieutenants Conder and Kitchener, R. E. Transliterated and Explained by E.H. Palmer. Committee of the Palestine Exploration Fund.
- Pringle, D. (1997). Secular buildings in the Crusader Kingdom of Jerusalem: an archaeological Gazetter. Cambridge University Press. ISBN 0521-46010-7.
- Röhricht, R. (1893). (RRH) Regesta regni Hierosolymitani (MXCVII-MCCXCI) (in Latin). Berlin: Libraria Academica Wageriana.
- Schumacher, G. (1888). "Population list of the Liwa of Akka". Quarterly Statement - Palestine Exploration Fund. 20: 169–191.
