= Shlomi, Israel =

Town in northern Israel

Shlomi שְׁלוֹמִי
- Local council

Hebrew transcription(s)
  - ISO 259: Šlomi
  - Also spelled: Shelomi (official)
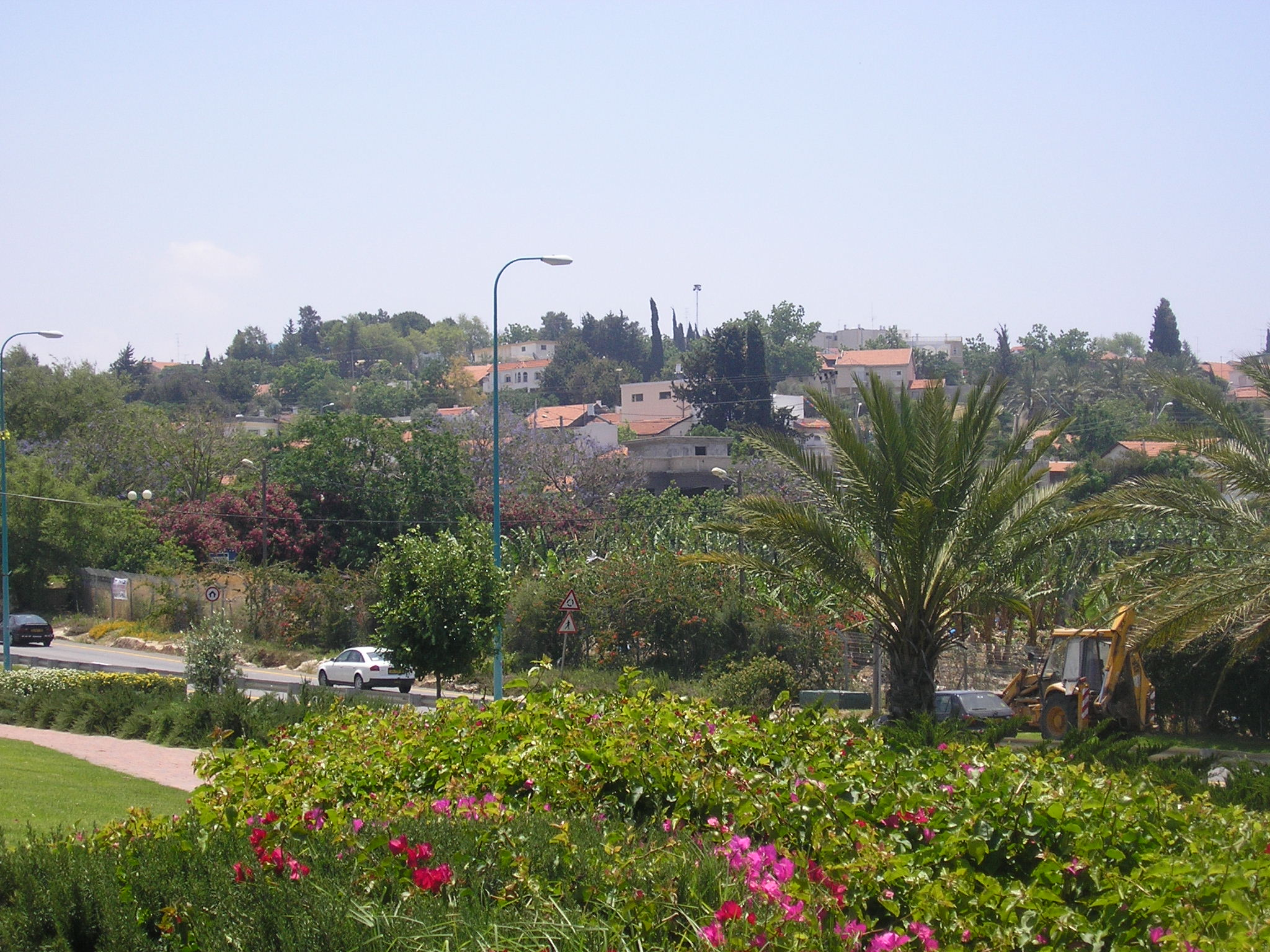

- Location within Northwest Israel Location within Israel
- Coordinates: 33°4′28″N 35°8′41″E
- Country: Israel
- District: Northern
- Subdistrict: Acre
- Natural Region: Nahariya
- Founded: 1950

Government
  - Head of Municipality: Gabi Naaman

Area
  - Total: 5,868 dunams (5.868 km^{2}; 2.266 sq mi)

Population (2024)
  - Total: 8,225
  - Density: 1,402/km^{2} (3,630/sq mi)

Shlomi (Hebrew: שְׁלוֹמִי) is a town in the Northern District of Israel. In 2024 it had a population of 8,225.

== Etymology ==
Shlomi was named after a leader from the tribe of Asher, mentioned in the Hebrew Bible (Num 34:27).

== History ==
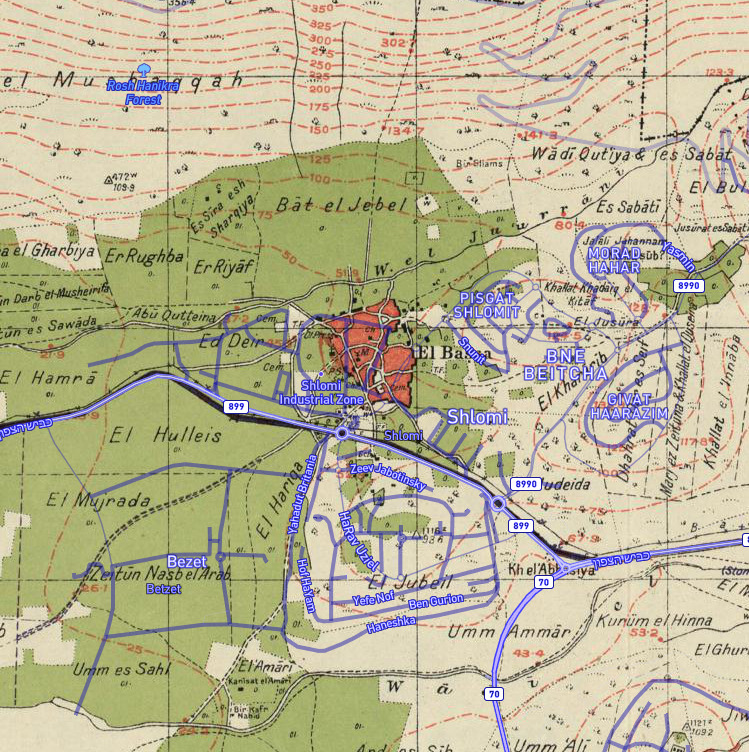
1940s map of al-Bassa, with the modern layout of Shlomi overlaid in blue.

Shlomi was founded as a Ma'abara in 1950 by Jewish immigrants from Tunisia and Morocco on the site of the former Palestinian village of al-Bassa, which had been destroyed during the 1948 Arab–Israeli War, and which Adolf Neubauer "proposed to identify... with the Batzet of the Talmud". The Palestinian Arab village was stormed by Haganah troops in May 1948 and almost completely razed. Its residents were either internally displaced or expelled to neighboring countries.

Shlomi was the target of Hezbollah Katyusha rocket attacks on 11 May 2005, Israel's Independence Day, and again on Israel's Independence Day in 2006.

It was again the target of rocket attacks on 12 July 2006, a diversion to facilitate the killing of three soldiers and kidnapping two others, which sparked the 2006 Lebanon War.

On 6 April 2023, several rockets hit the town and caused damage to a street and a commercial center.(refactored)

=== Gaza war ===
During the 2023-24 war between Hamas and Israel, northern Israeli border communities, including Shlomi, faced targeted attacks by Hezbollah and Palestinian factions based in Lebanon, and were evacuated.

== Demographics ==
Historical population
Year	Pop.	±%
1972	1,900	—
1983	2,300	+21.1%
1995	3,100	+34.8%
2008	5,900	+90.3%
2022	7,497	+27.1%
2024	8,226	+9.7%

In 2022, 91.8% of the population was Jewish and 8.2% was counted as other.

== Archaeology ==
=== Pi Metzuba ruins ===
On the road between Shlomi and Kibbutz Hanita, Israeli archaeologists found the remains of Pi Metzuba, a prosperous Christian town mentioned in the Jerusalem Talmud, the Tosefta (Shevi'it 4:8-ff.) and in the 3rd-century Mosaic of Rehob. The town was destroyed in the early seventh century when Persia invaded the region as part of its broader conflict with the Byzantine Empire.

=== Ma'sub inscription ===
The site of Khirbet Ma'sub, immediately to the east of the Arab village of Bassa, is where the Masub inscription was found before being purchased by the Louvre in 1885. Written in Phoenician script, the fragmentary Phoenician-language text, written in 222/21 BCE during Ptolemaic rule on a Hellenistic-style limestone stele, originates from a temple of Astarte and is on display at the Louvre.

== Voting Patterns ==
In the 2022 election, 69 percent of voters in Shlomi voted for the parties of the right-wing coalition led by Benjamin Netanyahu, while 28 percent voted for the parties of the center-left coalition led by Yair Lapid and 0.2 percent voted for the Arab parties.

In the 2026 election, 66 percent of voters in Shlomi voted for the parties of the right-wing coalition led by Benjamin Netanyahu, while 27 percent voted for the parties of the center-left coalition led by Gadi Eisenkot and 0.3 percent voted for the Arab parties. An additional 3.8 percent voted for the Reservists, and 2.3 percent voted for Amcha Yisrael. Voter turnout increased 18 percent from the 2022 election.
