= Asherat =

Asherat may refer to:

- Oshrat, a settlement in Israel
- Ashret, a settlement in northern Pakistan
