= Kfar Masaryk =

Kibbutz in northern Israel

Kfar Masaryk: כְּפַר מַסָּרִיק (Hebrew)
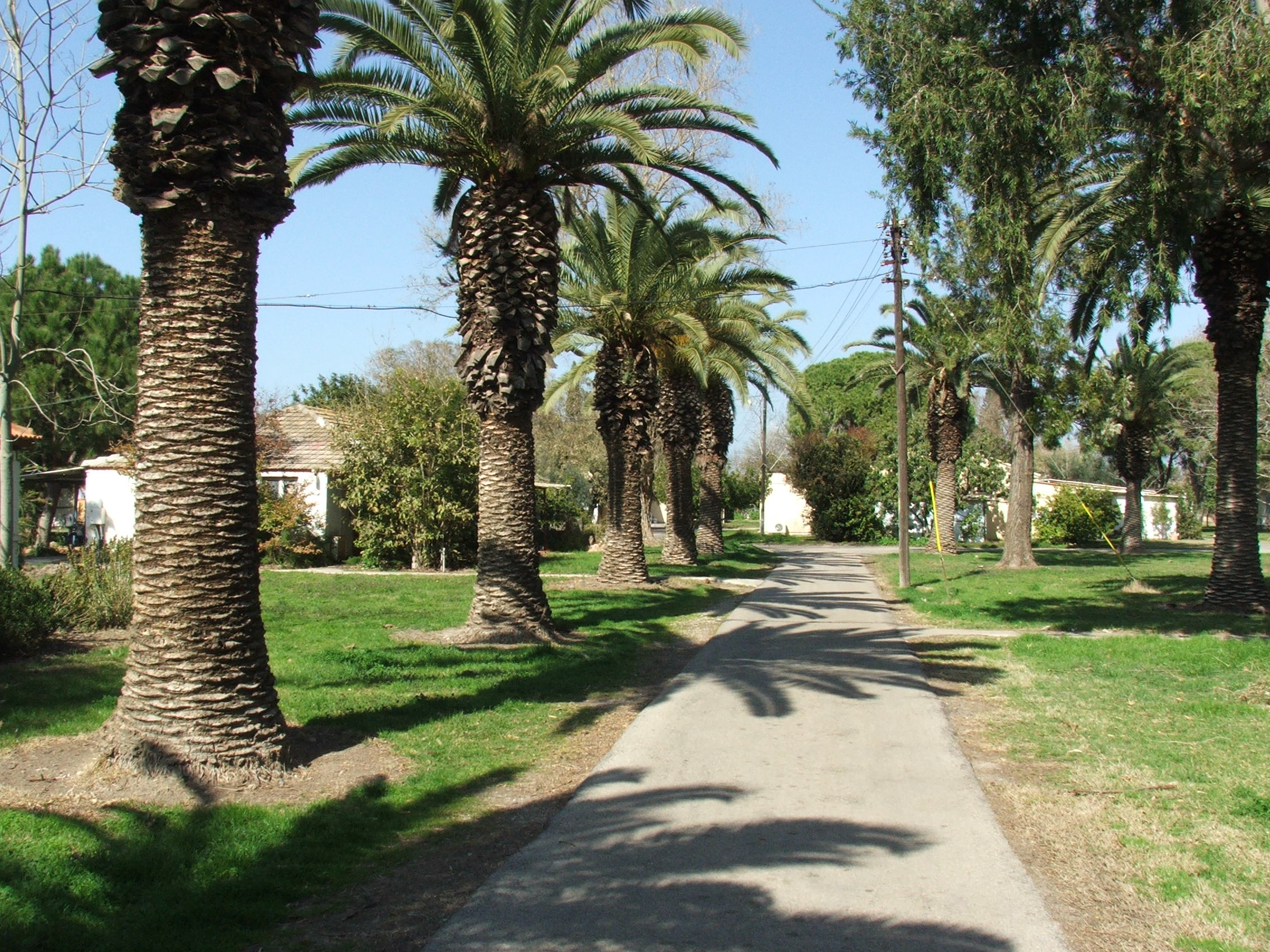
- Kfar Masaryk in February 2008
- Etymology: Masaryk Village
- Location within Northwest Israel Location within Israel
- Coordinates: 32°53′27″N 35°5′59″E
- Country: Israel
- District: Northern
- Subdistrict: Acre
- Council: Mateh Asher
- Affiliation: Kibbutz Movement
- Founded: 29 November 1938
- Founder: Czechoslovak and Lithuanian Jews
- Population (2024): 851
- Website: www.kfar-masaryk.org.il

Kfar Masaryk (/ˈmæsərɪk/, Hebrew: כְּפַר מַסָּרִיק, lit. 'Masaryk Village') is a kibbutz in northern Israel. Located in Western Galilee near the Belus River and south of Acre, it falls under the jurisdiction of Mateh Asher Regional Council. In 2024, it had a population of 851.

== History ==
The founders were Jewish immigrants from Czechoslovakia and Lithuania, who settled in Petah Tikva in 1932. The following year, they formed Kibbutz Czecho-Lita and moved to Bat Galim in Haifa. In 1934, they moved to an area of dunes near Kiryat Haim and changed the name of the group to "Mishmar Zevulun" (Guard of the Zevulun). In 1937 they were joined by a group of Polish Jewish immigrants who were members of Hayotzer.

Despite opposition from the Jewish Agency, who reasoned that the sandy soil could not support agriculture, Mishmar Zevulun was established on 29 November 1938 as the 29th tower and stockade settlement. In 1940 the kibbutz moved to its present site and was renamed Kfar Masaryk after Tomáš Garrigue Masaryk, the first President of Czechoslovakia.

== Economy ==
The kibbutz grows cotton, tomatoes, and avocados; breeds cattle, poultry, and carp; and operates paper and cardboard box factories. It also manufactures electronic devices.

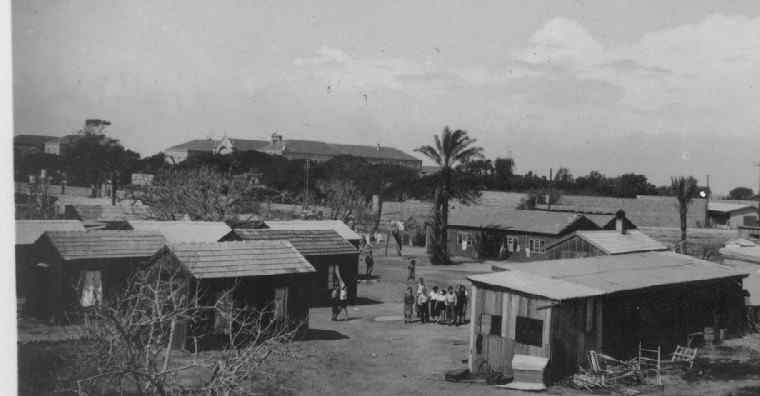
Kfar Masaryk, circa 1940-1950

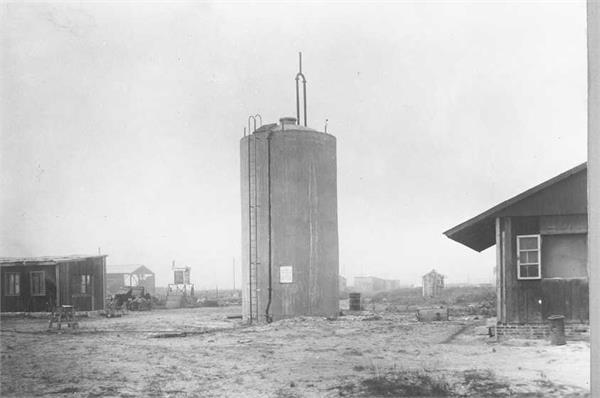
Kfar Masaryk water tower 1940

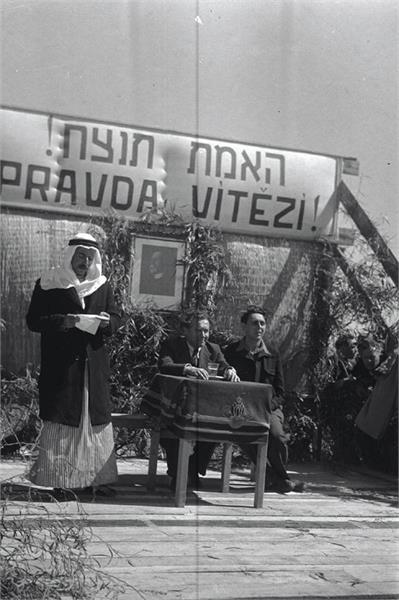
Kfar Masaryk 1940 opening ceremony

== See also ==
- Czech Republic-Israel relations
