= Klil =

Klil: כליל (Hebrew)
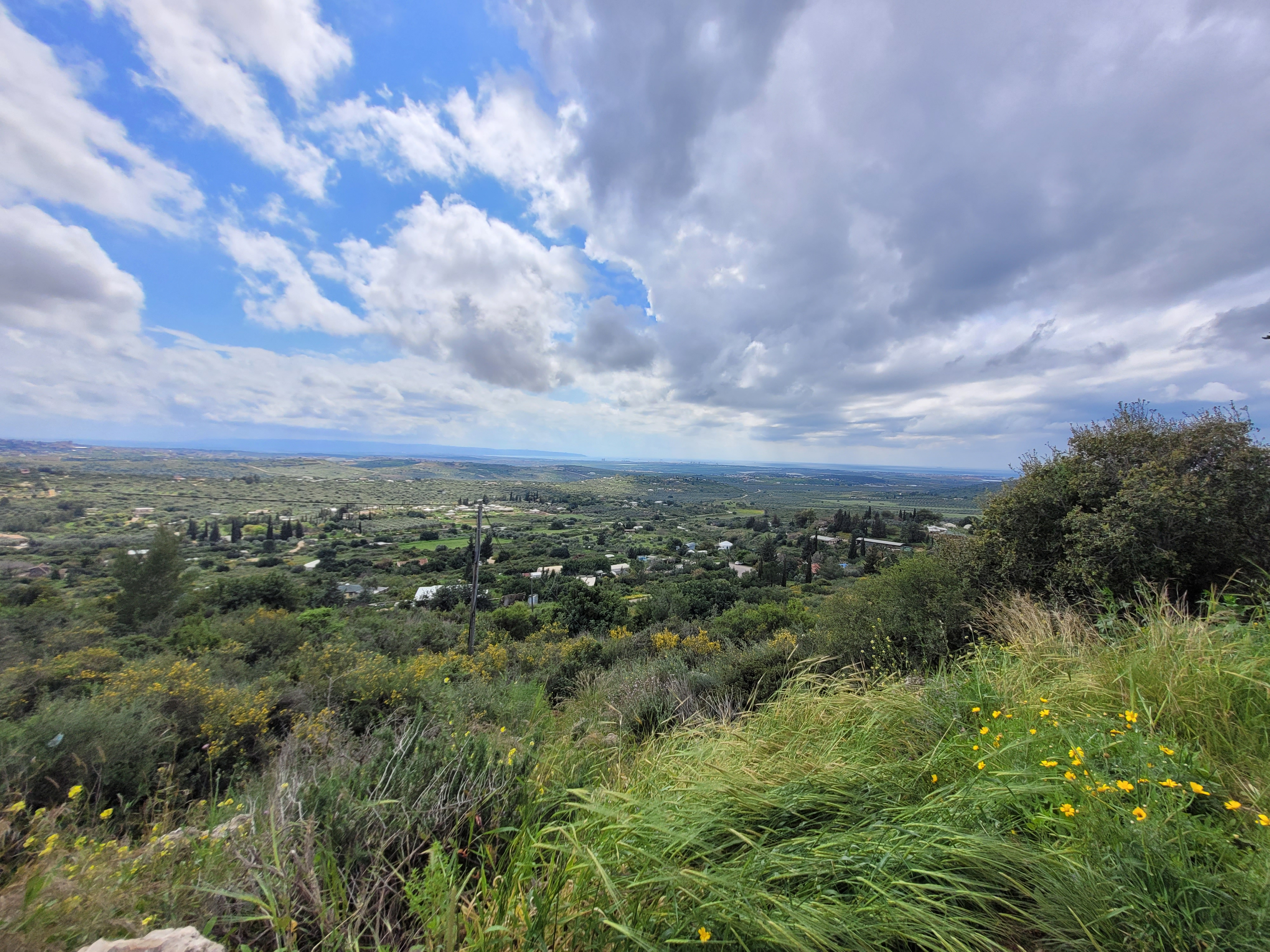

- Location within Northwest Israel Location within Israel
- Coordinates: 32°58′56″N 35°11′50″E
- Country: Israel
- District: Northern
- Subdistrict: Acre
- Council: Mateh Asher
- Affiliation: Agricultural Union
- Founded: 1979
- Population (2024): 924
- Website: www.clil.org.il

Klil (Hebrew: כליל) is an ecological community settlement in northern Israel. Located in the Western Galilee, southeast of Nahariya between Yanuh-Jat and Kafr Yasif, it falls under the jurisdiction of Mateh Asher Regional Council. In 2024 it had a population of 924.

== History ==
The village was established in 1979 by a group of city-dwellers who had purchased the land from landlords living in neighbouring villages. It was named after the ancient building discovered in the area called Hurvat Klil (lit. Klil Ruins).

The village is not connected to the power grid, and all electricity is generated by solar and wind power.

There is an olive orchard and press which manufactures organic olive oil, and a microbrewery, Malka, as well as a number of small enterprises such as a bakery and small restaurants.
