= Oshrat =

Oshrat: אָשְׁרַת (Hebrew)

Hebrew transcription(s)
  - Official: Asherat
- Location within Northwest Israel Location within Israel
- Coordinates: 32°58′18″N 35°9′19″E
- Country: Israel
- District: Northern
- Subdistrict: Acre
- Council: Mateh Asher
- Affiliation: HaMerkaz HaHakla'i
- Founded: 1983
- Population (2024): 615

Oshrat (Hebrew: אָשְׁרַת) is a community settlement in northern Israel. Located in the Western Galilee to the south-east of Nahariya and just north of Kafr Yasif, it falls under the jurisdiction of Mateh Asher Regional Council. In 2024 it had a population of 615.

The village was established in 1983 as an expansion of Moshav Amka.

== Etymology ==
Oshrat is a variation of the word Asher, the tribe on the lands of which the village stands. The founders used the word construction of Biblical names like Osnat, Tzafnat, etc.
