= Mateh Asher Regional Council =

Coordinates: 32°58′N 35°6′E

Mateh Asher מטה אשר
- Regional council (from 1982)
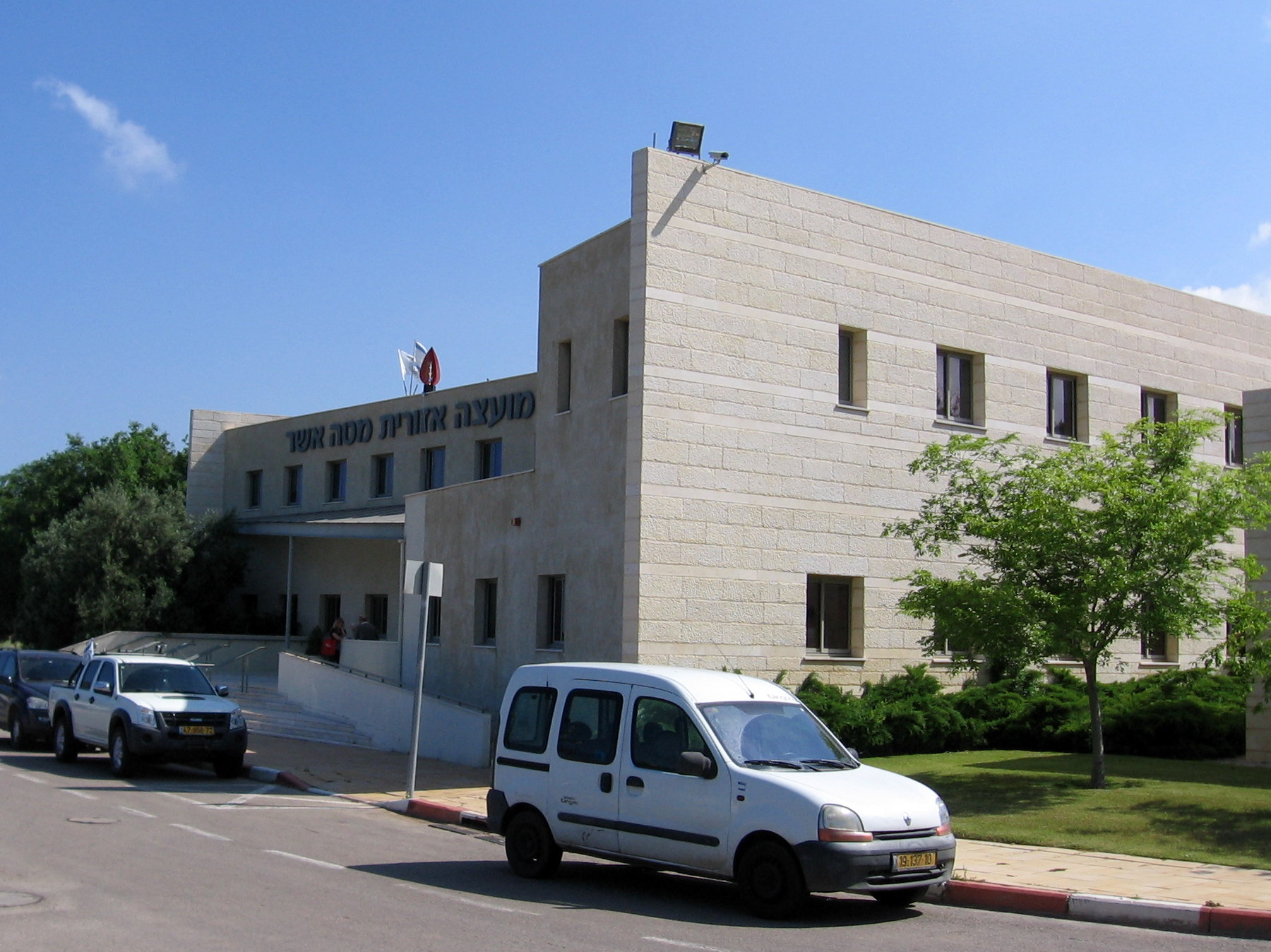
- Interactive map of Mateh Asher
- Country: Israel
- District: Northern
- Subdistrict: Acre
- Natural region: Akko, Elon, Nahariyya, Yehi'am

Government
  - Head of Municipality: Moshe Davidovich

Area
  - Total: 212,150 dunams (212.15 km^{2}; 81.91 sq mi)

Population (2024)
  - Total: 32,021
  - Density: 150.94/km^{2} (390.92/sq mi)
- Website: Official website

The Mateh Asher Regional Council (Hebrew: מועצה אזורית מטה אשר, Mo'atza Azorit Mateh Asher) is a regional council in the western Galilee of northern Israel. It is named after the Tribe of Asher, which had been allotted the region in antiquity according to the Book of Joshua (19:24–31). It was founded in 1982 as a merger of three regional councils: Ga'aton, Na'aman, and Sulam Tzor. The council's offices are located on the east side of Highway 4, between Regba and Lohamei HaGeta'ot.

The regional council was established in 1982, now stretches over 216,059 dunams and includes some 32,021 residents. As of 2018, the head of the regional council is Moshe Davidovich and the council's rabbi is Rabbi Shlomo Ben Eliyahu.

== List of settlements ==
This regional council provides municipal services for the populations within its territory, who live in various types of communities, including kibbutzim and moshavim, Arab villages, and community and other settlements:

=== Kibbutzim ===
- Adamit
- Afek
- Beit HaEmek
- Eilon
- Ein HaMifratz
- Evron
- Ga'aton
- Gesher HaZiv
- Hanita
- Kabri
- Kfar Masaryk
- Lohamei HaGeta'ot
- Matzuba
- Rosh HaNikra
- Sa'ar
- Shomrat
- Yehiam
- Yas'ur

=== Moshavim ===
- Ahihud
- Amka
- Ben Ami
- Bustan HaGalil
- Betzet
- Liman
- Netiv HaShayara
- Regba
- Shavei Tzion

=== Community settlements and villages ===
- Klil
- Nes Ammim
- Oshrat

=== Arab villages ===
- Arab al-Aramshe
- Sheikh Danun

== Demographics ==
In 2022, 82% of the population was Jewish, 15.2% was Muslim, 0.1% was Christian, and 2.7% was counted as other.

Historical population
Year	Pop.	±%
1972	9,200	—
1983	12,200	+32.6%
1995	14,000	+14.8%
2008	21,980	+57.0%
2022	30,978	+40.9%
2024	32,021	+3.4%

== Voting Patterns ==
In the 2022 election, 66 percent of voters in the regional council voted for the parties of the center-left coalition led by Yair Lapid, while 24 percent voted for the parties of the right-wing coalition led by Benjamin Netanyahu and 10 percent voted for the Arab parties.

In the 2026 election, 62 percent of voters in the regional council voted for the parties of the center-left coalition led by Gadi Eisenkot, while 19 percent voted for the parties of the right-wing coalition led by Benjamin Netanyahu and 14 percent voted for the Arab parties. An additional 2.9 percent voted for the Reservists, and 1.5 percent voted for Amcha Yisrael. Voter turnout increased 21 percent from the 2022 election.

== Twin towns ==
Mateh Asher is twin towns with following cities and districts:

- (in German): Oldenburg, since 1996
