= Liman, Israel =

Liman: לִימַן (Hebrew)

- Location within Northwest Israel Location within Israel
- Coordinates: 33°3′32″N 35°6′46″E
- Country: Israel
- District: Northern
- Subdistrict: Acre
- Council: Mateh Asher
- Affiliation: Moshavim Movement
- Founded: 1949
- Founder: Demobilized soldiers
- Population (2024): 895

Liman (Hebrew: לִימַן) is a moshav in northern Israel. Located in the Western Galilee about 5 km (3 mi) north of Nahariya, it falls under the jurisdiction of Mateh Asher Regional Council. In 2024 it had a population of 895. Its area is about 2400 dunams and most residents work in agriculture, including chicken raising.

== History ==
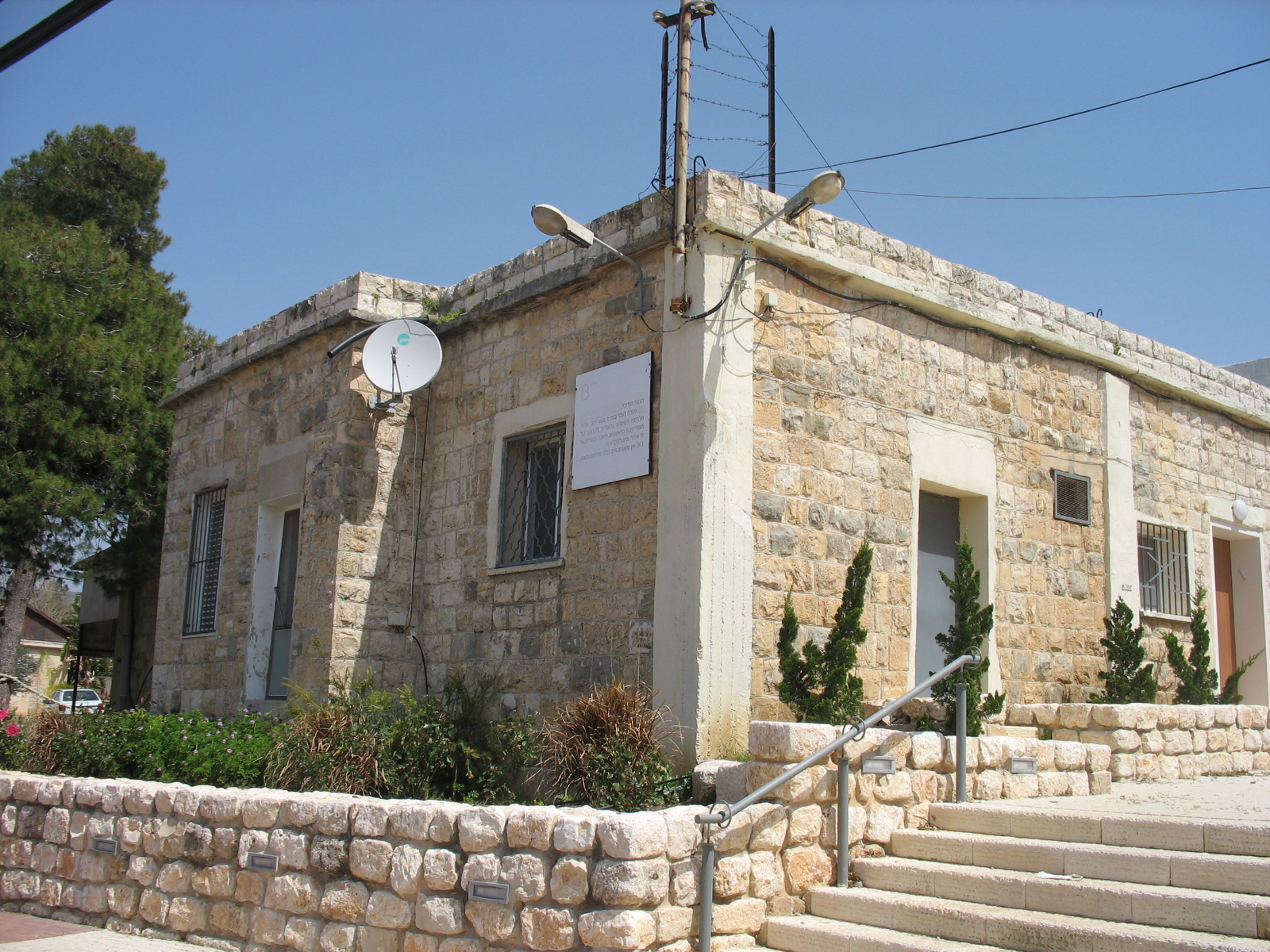
The well in Liman, was dug by the residents of al- Bassa. the only remnant of the village that survived in Liman

The village was founded in 1949 by a group of demobilized soldiers on part of the lands of the depopulated Palestinian village of al-Bassa. It was originally called Tzahal, but was later renamed "Liman" to honor the American senator Herbert H. Lehman.

The Liman Nature Reserve is located about 1 km (1 mi) north of the settlement, an area of about 50 dunams on a section of the gravel ridge that was preserved.

A 3rd century painted tomb from the Roman period was discovered in the fields of Liman in 1994–1995. The tomb contained two skeletons, bottles, coins and pottery.
