= Gesher HaZiv =

Kibbutz in northern Israel

Gesher HaZiv: גשר הזיו (Hebrew)
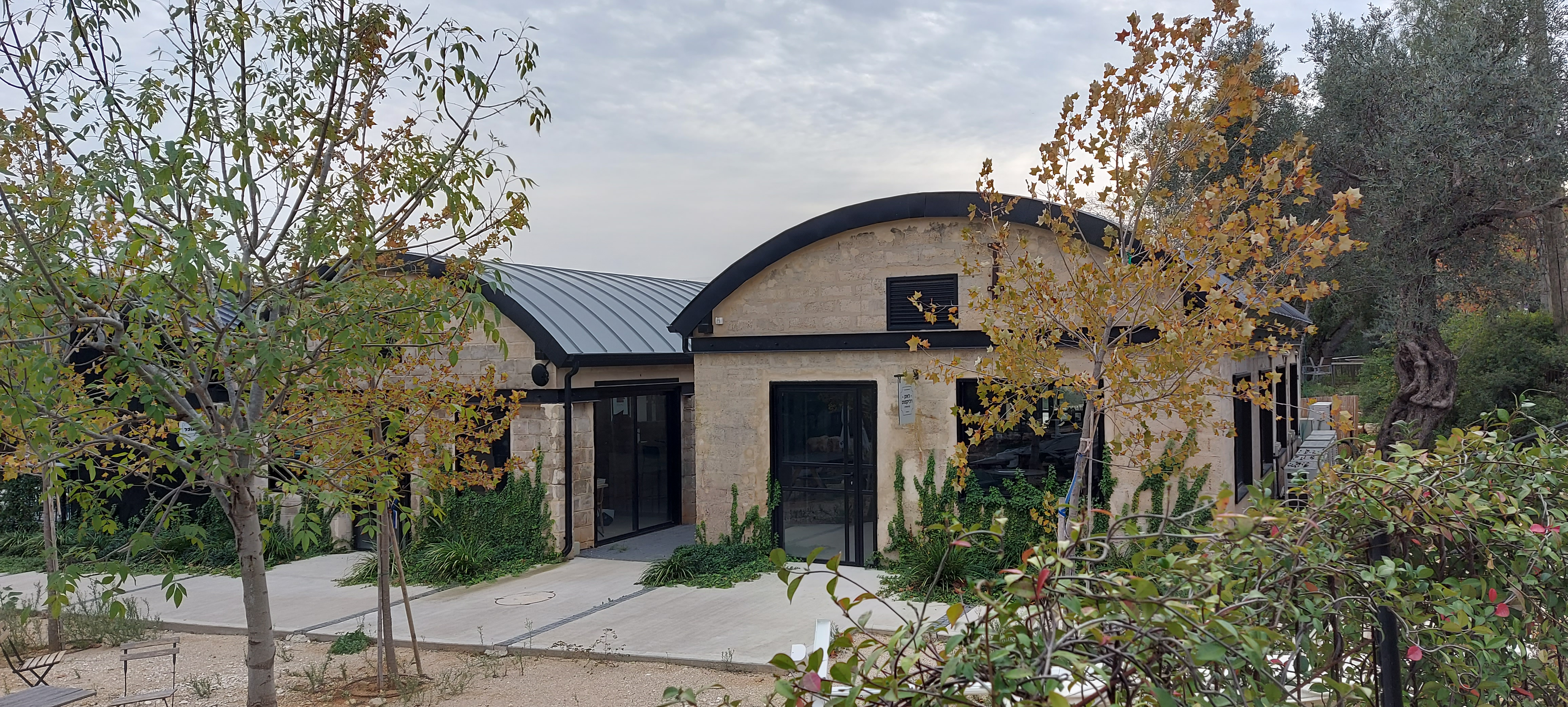
- Etymology: Bridge of Splendor
- Location within Northwest Israel Location within Israel
- Coordinates: 33°2′20″N 35°6′41″E
- Country: Israel
- District: Northern
- Subdistrict: Acre
- Council: Mateh Asher
- Affiliation: Kibbutz Movement
- Founded: 1949
- Founder: North American Habonim members and former members of kibbutz Beit HaArava
- Population (2024): 1,513
- Website: www.gesher-haziv.org.il

Gesher HaZiv (Hebrew: גשר הזיו, lit. 'Bridge of Splendor') is a kibbutz in northern Israel. Situated in the Western Galilee on the coastal highway between Nahariya and the Lebanese border, opposite the Akhziv National Park, it falls under the jurisdiction of Mateh Asher Regional Council. In 2024 it had a population of 1,513.

== History ==
Gesher HaZiv was founded on land near the former Palestinian village of Az-Zeeb, close to the village site.

The kibbutz was founded in 1948 by two groups: 120 people from the first immigrants' gar'in of the Habonim Labor Zionist youth movement of North America, and half of the former members of kibbutz Beit HaArava, evacuated on 20 May 1948 during the then-ongoing War of Independence. It is named in memory of the 14 Palmach members who were killed in the prime of their lives (Ziv Alumeihem), during the 1946 Night of the Bridges, as well as in relation to the ancient Phoenician and Arab village of Achziv whose nearby remains are part of a national park by the sea. The kibbutz quickly became an agricultural success after its founding.

In July 1998, Gesher HaZiv joined the vanguard of "privatization" in the kibbutz movement. Largely due to pressures caused by collective debts, the majority of the membership voted to adopt a policy of "differential income". Numerous economic branches were sold off, and many communal services were either shut down entirely or converted to a non-subsidized, pay-per-use basis. Kibbutz homes were parceled into separate lots and became the private property of each kibbutz family.

In 2004 the kibbutz began absorbing 200 families in a new housing development. The new families together with the veteran kibbutz members formed an administrative municipality which manages the community.

The veteran members retained the framework of the veteran kibbutz. In this framework they have maintained a level of mutual aid and economic cooperation, while all community services and activities are shared by all members of the new municipality. From 2006, many children of the veteran members, who had left the kibbutz in previous years, began returning with their families to build their homes in the revitalized community. They have become members of the community municipality, but also of the veteran kibbutz framework.

== Education ==
In 1952, Gesher HaZiv became the second kibbutz to have its children sleep in the parents' homes (Hebrew: לינה משפחתית, lina Mishpahtit) rather than in communal children's houses (Hebrew: לינה משותפת, lina meshutefet).

On the kibbutz grounds are two regional schools: the elementary school Hofei HaGalil ("Galilee Shores"; grades 1–6) and the experiential secondary school Sulam Tsor ("Ladder to Tyre"; grades 7–12). These schools serve local kibbutzim and moshavim, along with accepting private students from nearby towns. Since the mid-1990s, Gesher HaZiv has its own local chapter of the Zionist youth movement HaNoar HaOved VeHaLomed.

== Archaeology ==
Archaeological findings include a gravestone of a Roman legionnaire from Legio X Fretensis, and a fragment of a Greek inscription.

== Notable people ==
- David Coren (1917–2011), politician and pedagogue
- Tomer Ginat (born 1994), basketball player
