= Sa'ar =

Sa'ar: סַעַר (Hebrew)
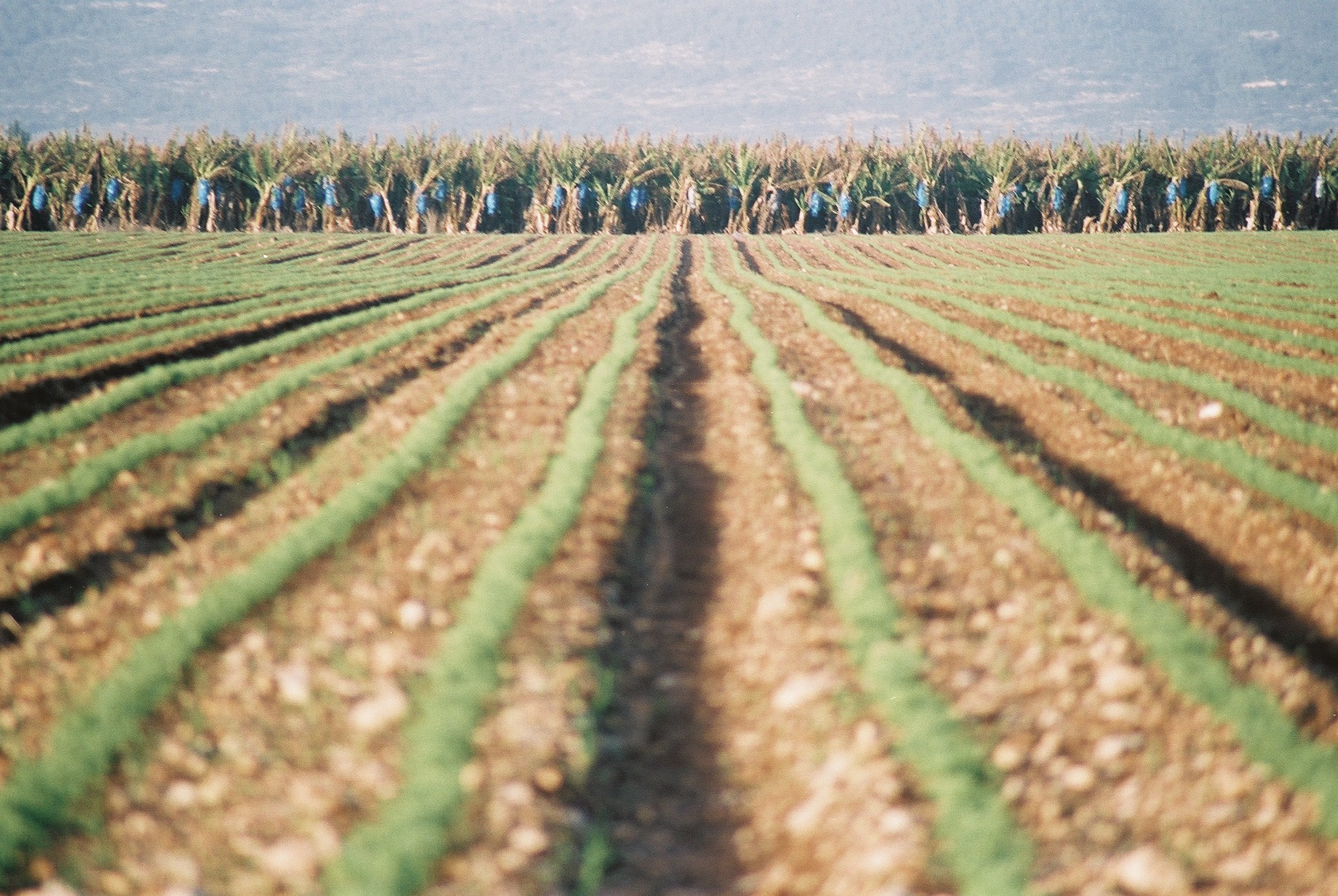
- Etymology: Storm
- Location within Northwest Israel Location within Israel
- Coordinates: 33°1′43″N 35°6′35″E
- Country: Israel
- District: Northern
- Subdistrict: Acre
- Council: Mateh Asher
- Affiliation: Kibbutz Movement
- Founded: August 1948
- Founder: Hashomer Hatzair and Holocaust survivors
- Population (2024): 907

Sa'ar (Hebrew: סַעַר, lit. 'Storm') is a kibbutz in the western Galilee in Israel. Located near Nahariya, it falls under the jurisdiction of Mateh Asher Regional Council. In 2024 it had a population of 907.

== History ==
The kibbutz was founded in August 1948 by members of the Socialist-Zionist youth movement Hashomer Hatzair and by Holocaust survivors. The kibbutz site had formerly been part of the village lands of the depopulated Palestinian village of Az-Zeeb, south of the village site.

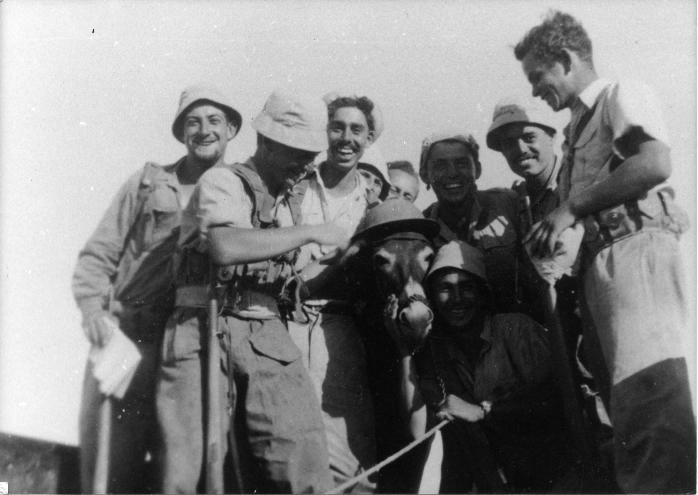
Yiftach 3rd Battalion. Sa'ar. 1948

In August 2006, many of the kibbutz residents fled in the wake of Hezbollah rocket fire of up to 60 rockets a day. Kibbutz member David Lelchook was killed by shrapnel from a missile that hit the front yard of his home.

== Economy ==
Bermad Innovative Water Management Solutions, jointly owned with Kibbutz Evron, manufactures automatically activated hydraulic valves used in water, fuel and fire extinguishing systems.

== Notable people ==
- Jerry Seinfeld, worked as a volunteer at the age of 16 at this kibbutz
