= Nes Ammim =

Nes Ammim: נֵס עַמִּים (Hebrew)
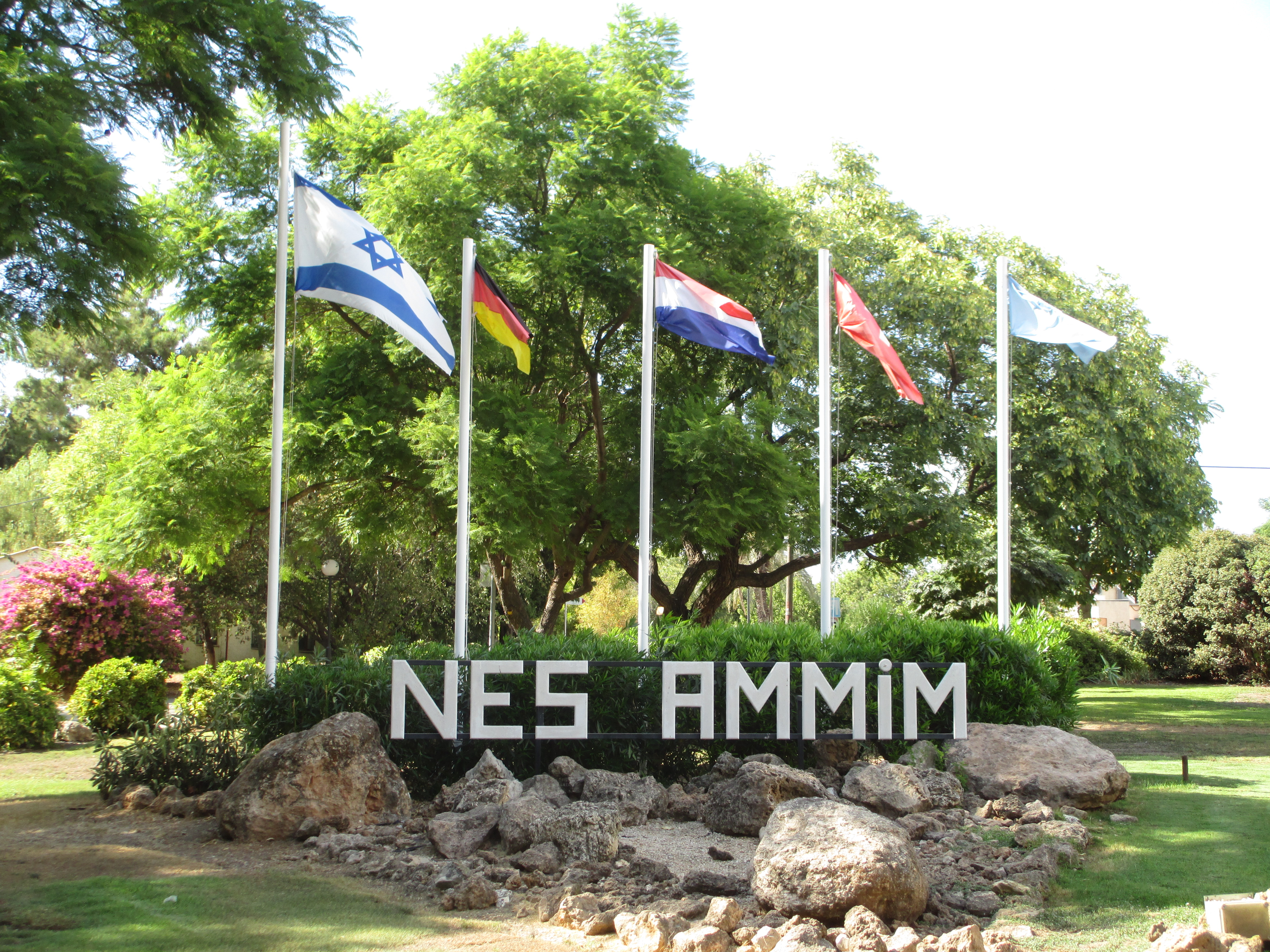
- Etymology: 'Banner of the Nations'
- Location within Northwest Israel Location within Israel
- Coordinates: 32°57′58″N 35°7′14″E
- Country: Israel
- District: Northern
- Subdistrict: Acre
- Council: Mateh Asher
- Founded: 1964
- Population (2024): 451

Nes Ammim (Hebrew: נֵס עַמִּים, lit. Banner of the Nations) is a village in northern Israel. Located close to the towns of Acre and Nahariya in the western Galilee region, it falls under the jurisdiction of Mateh Asher Regional Council. In 2024 it had a population of 451.

It was founded by European Christians as a sign of solidarity with the Jewish People after the Holocaust. Its theology emphasises the need for dialogue with Jews and also with adherents of other religions.

== Background ==
In the aftermath of the slaughter of six million European Jews in the heart of Christian Europe, in the 1950s a movement sprung up of Christians who were not only profoundly shocked by this event, but also sought to give expression to a desire for a different relationship. This was to encompass the rejection of attempts to convert Jews to Christianity, and the desire for dialogue and mutual respect in place of confrontation and triumphalism.

Among those thinking this way, were some who thought a concrete expression of this new approach could take the form of building a living Christian community in Israel. It would work the land and participate in the hardship of what was still a poor country under threat of war. This idea, after fund-raising and promotion among churches in Germany, the Netherlands, Switzerland and the USA, resulted in the purchase in 1960 of 250 acres (1.0 km^{2}) of land from a Druze sheikh in the Galilee. The first inhabitants moved into the village in 1963. Prominent among them was Dr. Johan Pilon, who was to be its guide and inspiration for over ten years until his death in 1975.

== Name and logo ==
"Nes Ammim" was chosen as the Hebrew name for the new village. It is taken from the Bible, from Isaiah 11:10, and means "Banner of the Nations". The pioneers from different nations saw it as their calling to show their friendship and solidarity in the Land of Israel.

The Nes Ammim logo consisted of a fish outline crossing a blade of wheat. The fish is a symbol of the early Christian church that refers to Jesus. The fish is meshed with the wheat, to represent a community growing in the country.

== History ==
As for every other village in Israel, the early years were characterised by hard work on the land. Simple accommodation was built, and a communal dining hall and other facilities. It was similar to a kibbutz or more exactly to a moshav shitufi, a collective settlement but where families were living with their children in their own houses. Agriculture was the main activity, and avocado orchards were planted as a long-term venture.

The presence of Dutch inhabitants gave an opportunity to add another element to the project. The community could assist by bringing technical experts from the Netherlands to develop the cut-flower industry as an export crop. Glasshouses were built, which would expand over the years and be the mainstay of the community's income for many years.

During the latter part of the 1970s and throughout the 1980s Nes Ammim expanded rapidly and diversified into the booming tourist trade. Numerous groups of Christian pilgrims visited the community during their visit to Galilee. A youth hostel and guesthouse were built. The population rose to 140 adults and 60 children. A lively community life ensued, and hundreds of young Christians worked there for short or long periods before returning to their churches in Europe with the knowledge learned there. However, the two Palestinian intifadas hit the Christian tourist trade hard. Nes Ammim was seriously affected. To make matters worse, Israel's high-tech economy pushed up costs and made the cut-flower trade no longer viable. Retrenchment was required as debts mounted.

In 2012, the community decided to adopt a more inclusive inter-faith "dimension", and to transform its facilities into a meeting place for Jewish and Arab citizens of Israel. The residential buildings are now rented out to Jewish Israelis, and attempts are made to find some Arab Israelis as well. Applicants are vetted by a committee consisting of four Jewish Israelis and two Dutchmen. Since Nes Ammim is owned by a private corporation, it claims exemption from the Israeli law that requires that decisions by vetting committees must be transparent and cannot be discriminatory, a law upheld in the famous Ka'adan case.

== Aims of the movement ==
The movement still maintains its aims as they have been developed over the years. These are:

- To develop a Christian theology that is free from anti-Judaism and that advocates a non-missionary approach to Jews
- To show practical solidarity to the Jewish People by living a concrete community in Israel .
- To learn about the origins of Christian faith by studying Jewish tradition. A starting point is the shocking realization: that the Nazi Holocaust directed against the Jews was facilitated by a centuries-long negative image of Jews and Judaism, promoted by numerous church leaders.
- To contribute - in a modest way - to peace-making, by organizing seminars of encounter and dialogue between Israeli Jews and Arabs.

== See also ==
- Otto Busse, a German resistance fighter and Righteous Among the Nations who lived in Nes Ammim
- Gert van Klinken, Nes Ammim. Protestants in the young State of Israel, 1952-1967 (Hilversum, 2021).
