= Hanita =

Kibbutz in northern Israel

Hanita: חניתה (Hebrew)
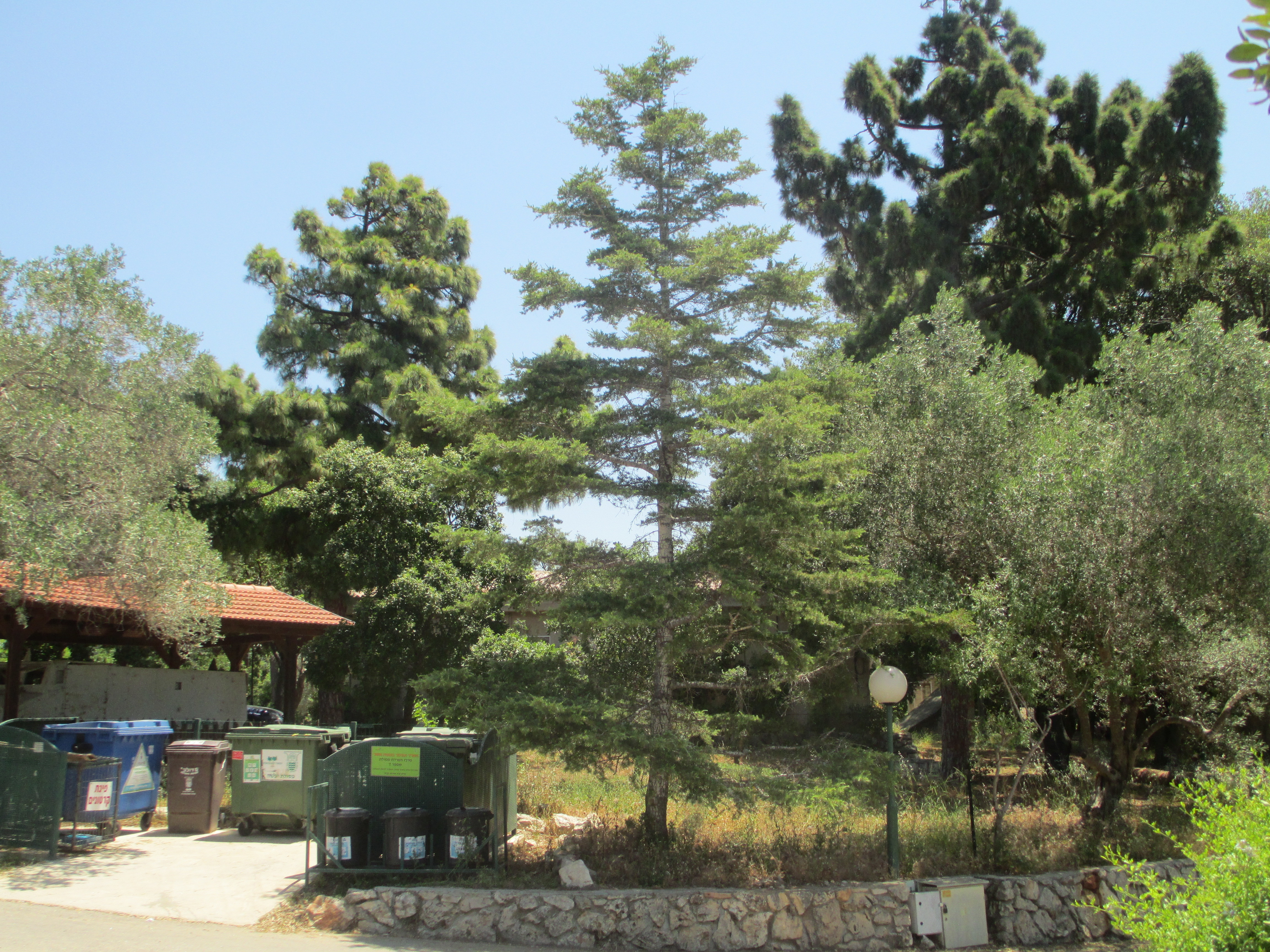

- Location within Northwest Israel Location within Israel
- Coordinates: 33°5′15″N 35°10′25″E
- Country: Israel
- District: Northern
- Subdistrict: Acre
- Council: Mateh Asher
- Affiliation: Kibbutz Movement
- Founded: 1938
- Founder: Jewish pioneers
- Population (2024): 793
- Website: www.hanita.co.il

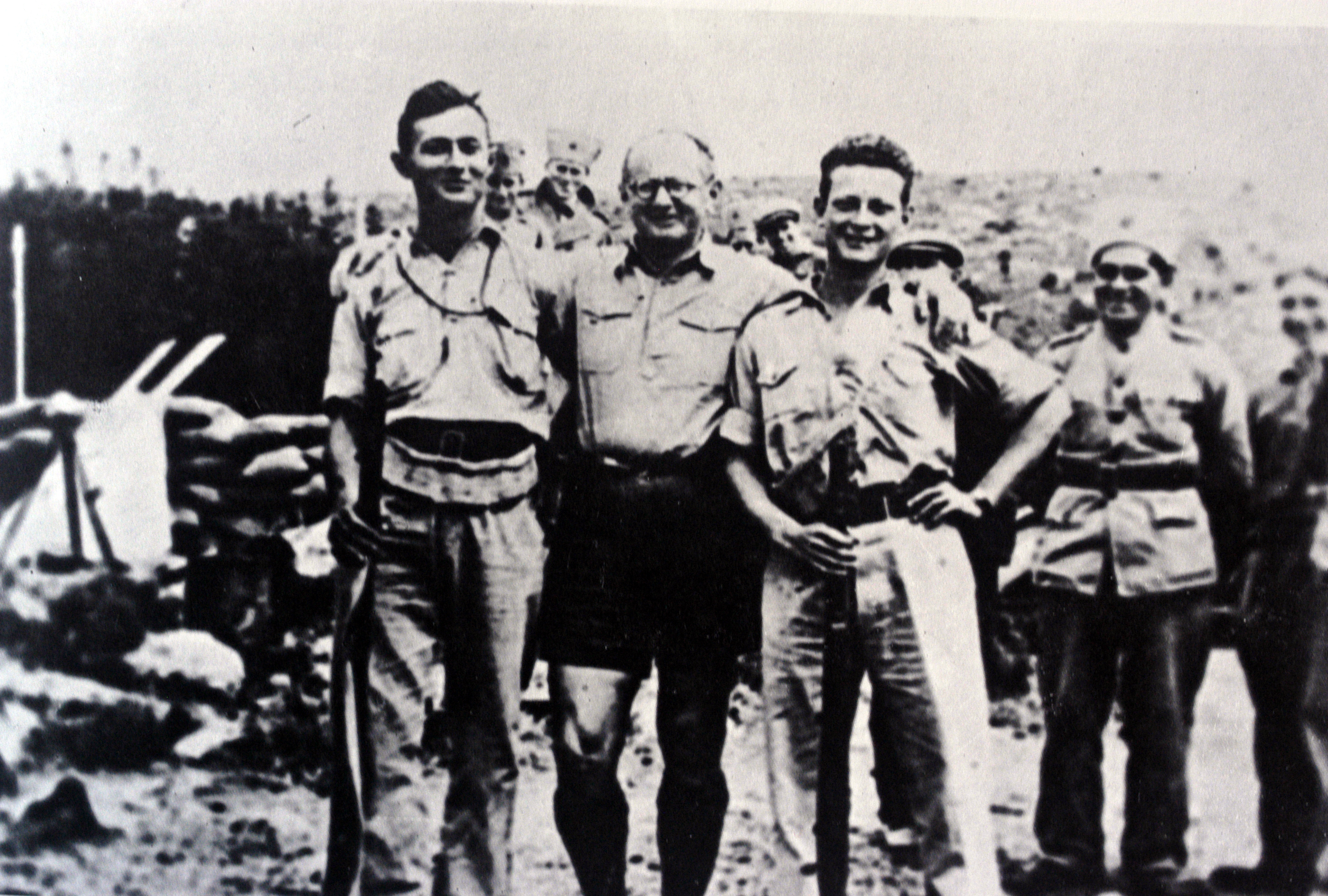
Moshe Dayan, Yitzhak Sadeh, and Yigal Allon. Hanita, 1938

Hanita (Hebrew: חניתה) is a kibbutz in northern Israel. Located in the western Galilee approximately 15 kilometres northeast of Nahariya, it falls under the jurisdiction of Mateh Asher Regional Council. In 2024 it had a population of 793.

== History ==
=== Antiquity ===
Hanita was established on the site of an ancient ruin by that same name (Hanita; variant: Hanuta), and is mentioned in rabbinic writings: Tosefta (Shevi'it 4:9), the Jerusalem Talmud (Demai 2:1) and in the 3rd-century Mosaic of Rehob.

=== Ottoman era ===
In the 1878 Palestine Exploration Fund Map published by C. R. Conder and HH Kitchener it was listed as the ruin, Khurbet Hanuta.

=== British Mandate ===
Hanita was established on 21 March 1938, as part of the Tower and stockade operation during the 1936–39 Arab revolt. However, Hanita was a special project, the largest of the entire operation and led directly by Yitzhak Sadeh, a top military leader of the Yishuv (Jewish community in Mandatory Palestine). Unlike other Tower and stockade settlements, Hanita was not established out of another nearby settlement, where all building material would be stored in advance, as was the rule. The lack of Jewish settlements in Western Galilee and the site's extremely remote location precluded that option. Four-hundred people contributed in the erection of the first walled camp, many notrim (Jewish Mandatory police) included. There were no roads leading to the site and materials had to be carried by hand under armed protection. Due to the 1937 Peel Commission report, the Yishuv leadership under David Ben-Gurion thought the partition of Palestine to be imminent, with the borders to be decided through diplomacy, and with no Jewish foothold the Western Galilee would remain out of bounds. Hanita was one of the new Jewish settlements established in the area, with an additional defensive role, as it sat directly on the border with Lebanon, which was at the time controlled by France. The establishment of Hanita was hailed as the most impressive action of the Tower and stockade operation, it was in part captured on film, and became the subject of an opera.

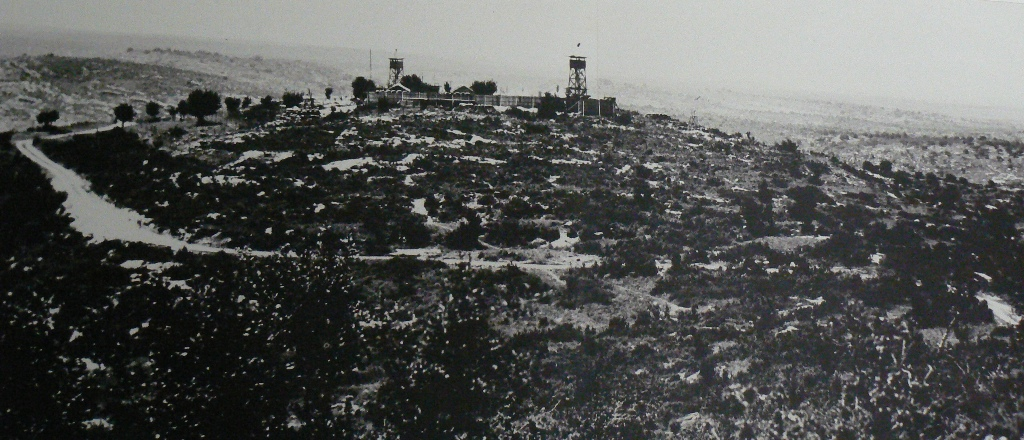
Hanita, 1938

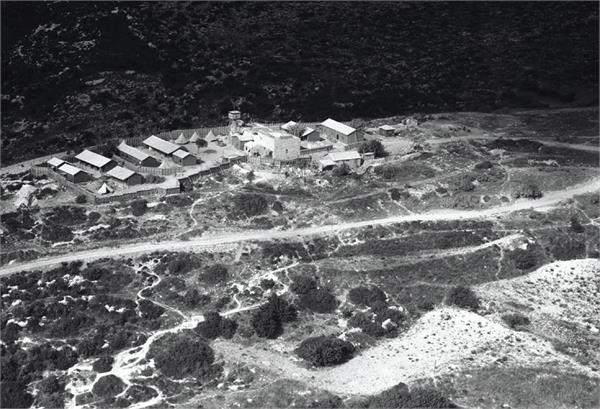
Hanita, 1938

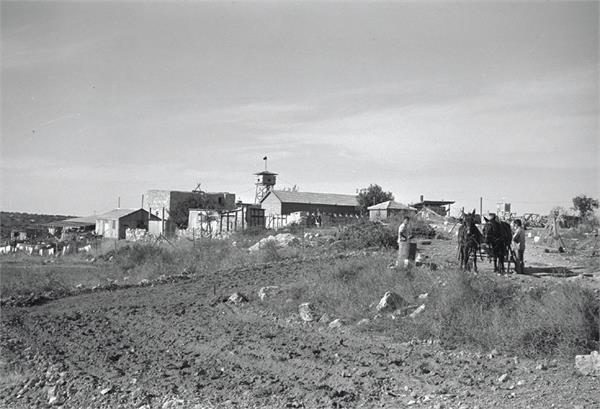
Hanita, 1938

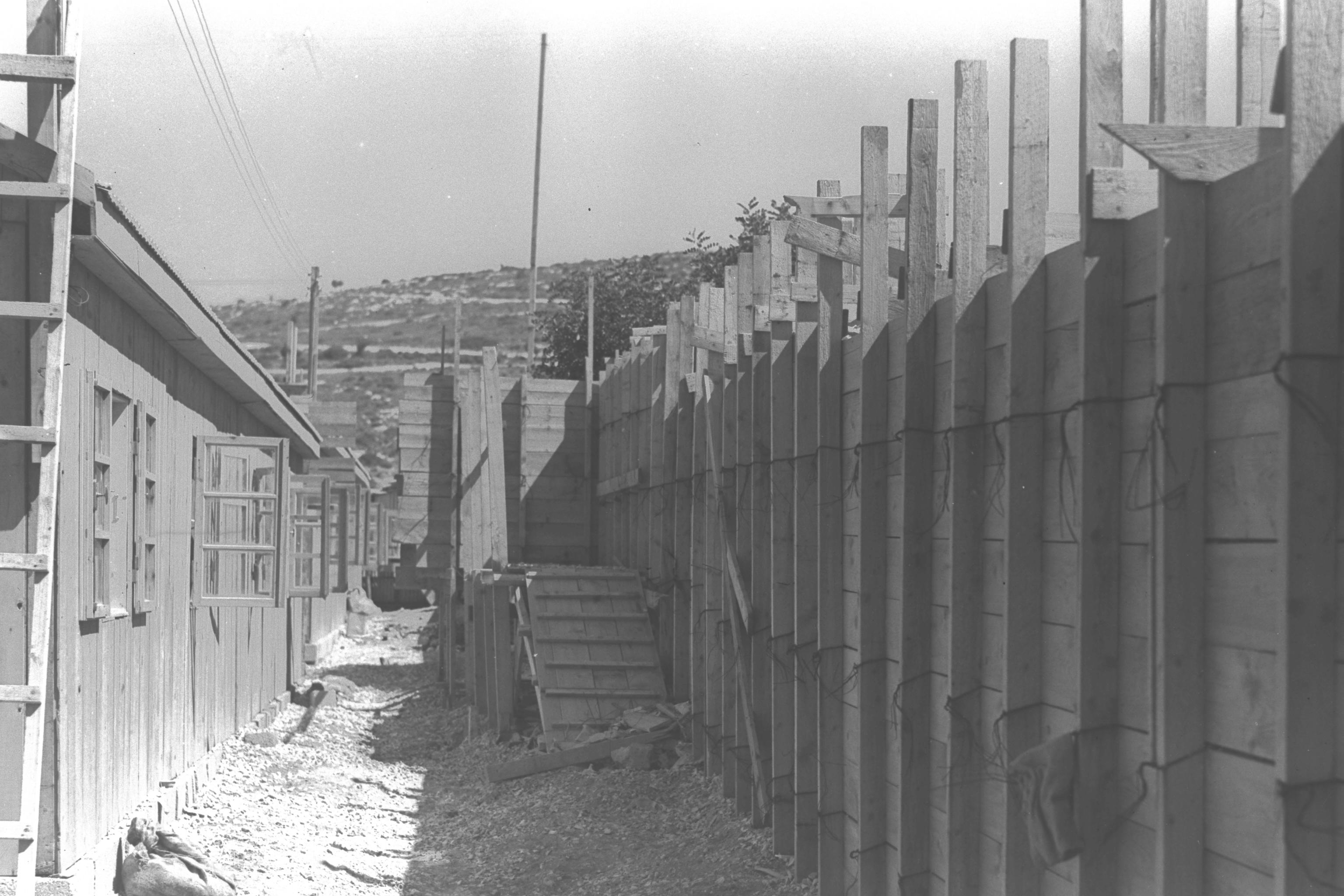
Hanita, inside the wall, June 1938

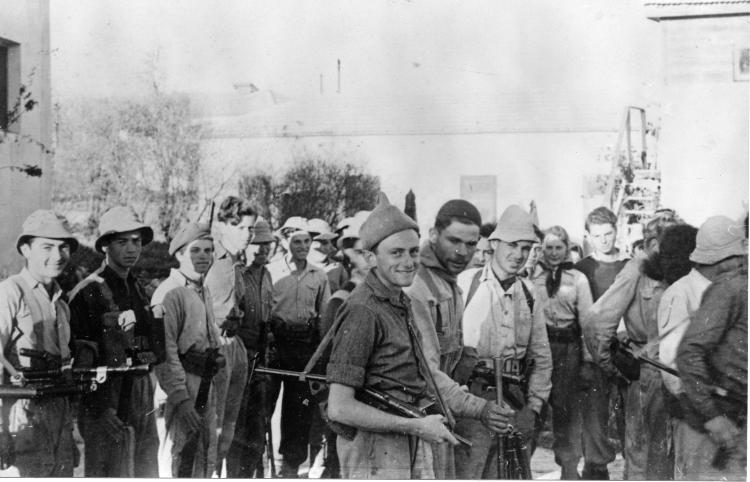
Members of Yiftach Brigade, "D" Company, assembling at Hanita, 1948

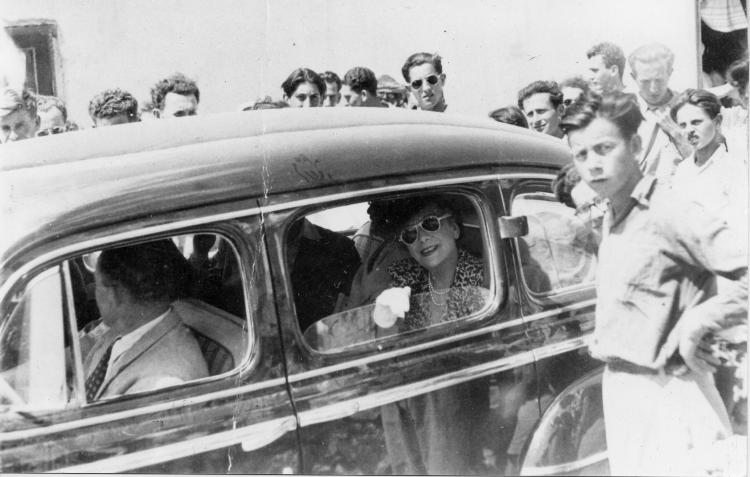
Chaim Weizmann visiting Hanita

=== 2023 Gaza war ===
During the Gaza war, northern Israeli border communities, including Hanita, faced targeted attacks by Hezbollah and Palestinian factions based in Lebanon, and were evacuated.

== Economy ==
The economy is based on a combination of agriculture and industry. The kibbutz grows bananas, citrus fruits and field crops. Its main source of income comes from two factories: Kotlab produces metalized films for packaging, heat and cold insulation, and use in safety devices. Hanita Lenses produces contact lenses and lenses for implants.

Scenes from the 1953 Kirk Douglas film The Juggler were filmed in Hanita.

== Museum ==
The kibbutz operates a museum documenting two topics: one is the history of the Tower and Stockade settlements built in response to the Arab riots of 1936–1939; the other topic is the archaeology of the area. The museum displays documents relating to the purchase of the land and the security problems faced by the kibbutz, as well as archaeological finds unearthed at Hanita and vicinity, including artistically impressive panels of a mosaic floor from the 6th-7th century Byzantine church, excavated next to the museum building.

== Notable people ==
- Moshe Dayan (1915–1981)
- Eliezer Ben-Rafael (born 1938), professor of sociology
- Matti Caspi (1949-2026), composer, musician, singer, and lyricist
