= Amka =

Moshav in northern Israel

Amka: עַמְקָה (Hebrew)
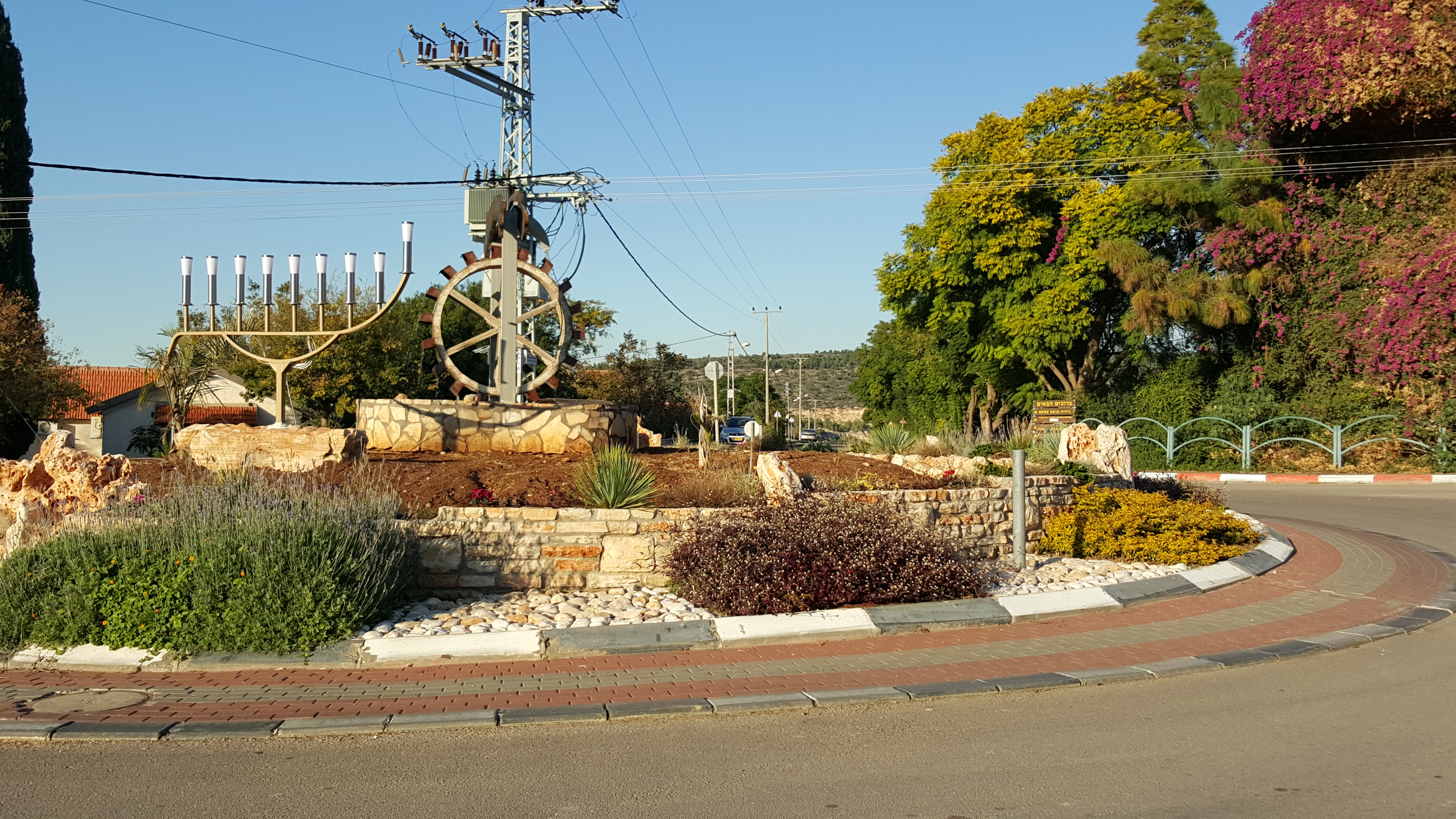

- Location within Northwest Israel Location within Israel
- Coordinates: 32°58′46″N 35°9′48″E
- Grid position: 215400/764900 ITM; 166/265 PAL
- Country: Israel
- District: Northern
- Subdistrict: Acre
- Council: Matte Asher
- Region: Western Galilee
- Founded: Bronze age (Beth ha-Emek); Classic era (Kfar Amka); 1949 (modern Moshav)
- Founder: Yemenite Jews
- Population (2024): 946

Amka (Hebrew: עַמְקָה), also Amqa (Arabic: عمقا), is a moshav in the Matte Asher Regional Council of Israel's Northern District, near Acre. The moshav, located in the vicinity of Amqa, a Palestinian village depopulated during the 1948 Arab–Israeli War, was founded by Yemenite Jews in 1949. In 2024, its population was 946.

== Etymology ==
Edward Henry Palmer thought that the name Amka derived from the Arabic word for “deep”, but according to Ringgren, it preserves the name of Beth Ha-Emek, a city mentioned in Joshua 19:27 as part of the allotment of the Tribe of Asher.

== History ==
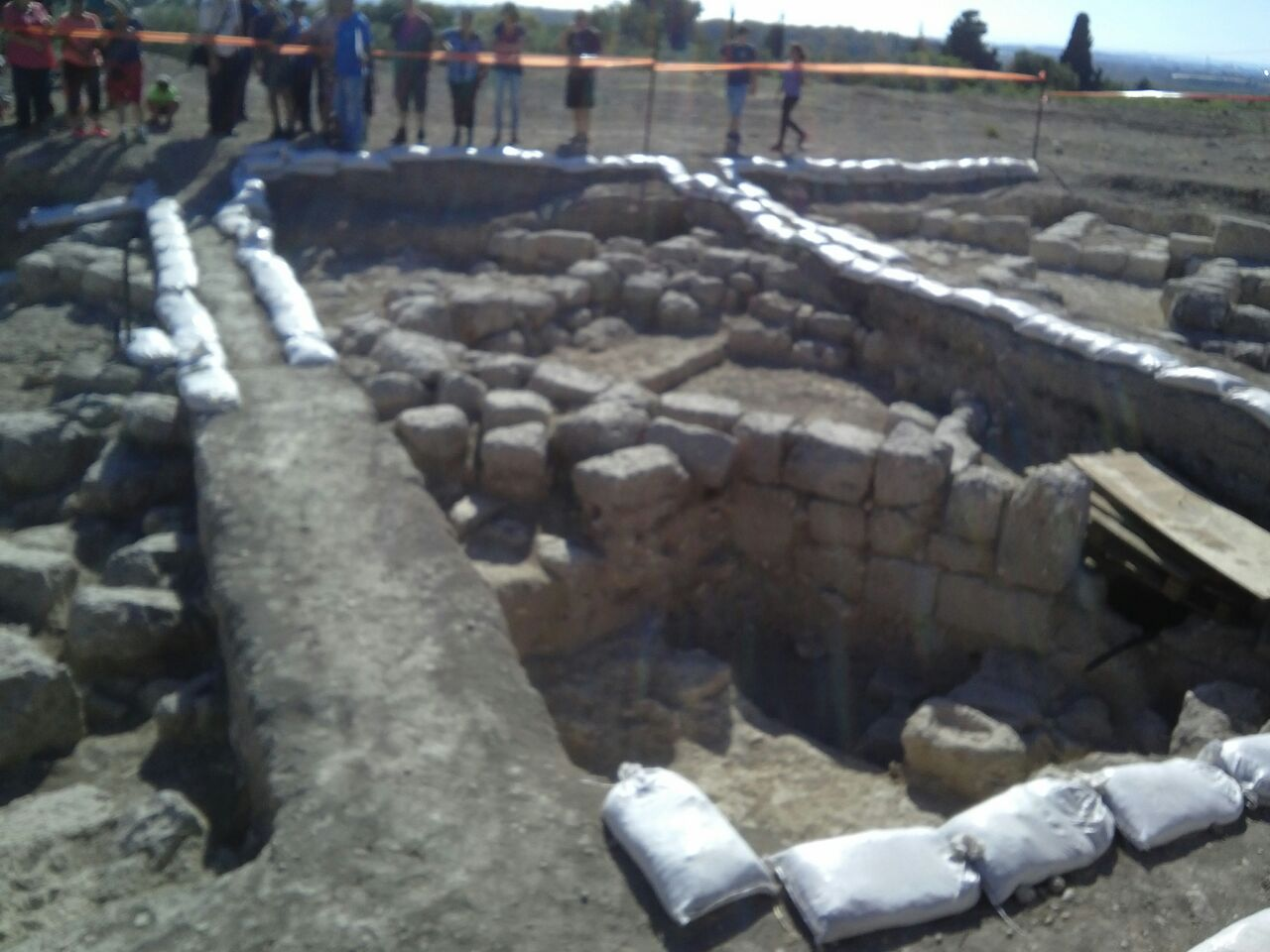
Excavations in Amka

Amka is identified with Kefar Amiqo (Hebrew: כפר עמיקו), a place mentioned in the Mishnah and Tosefta. Walid Khalidi writes that during the Roman period, the village located at the site was called Kefar Amqa.

=== Crusader period ===
During the Crusader period, Amka was referred to as Amca. In 1179, Joscelin III acquired the land of the village, and in 1220 Jocelyn III's daughter Beatrix de Courtenay and her husband Otto von Botenlauben, Count of Henneberg, sold their land, including ‘’Amca’’, to the Teutonic Knights.

In 1283, Amka was mentioned as part of the domain of the Crusaders during the hudna between the Crusaders based in Acre and the Mamluk sultan al-Mansur (Qalawun).

=== Ottoman Empire ===
Incorporated into the Ottoman Empire in 1517, Amqa appeared in the 1596 tax registers as being in the nahiya (subdistrict) of Akka under the liwa' (district) of Safad, with a population of 215. All the inhabitants were Muslim. The villagers paid taxes on a number of crops, such as wheat, barley, olives, cotton and fruit, and on other types of produce, such as goats and beehives.

In the early 18th century, the village was under control of Shaykh Najm. He had an agreement to sell the cotton from this and other villages under his control exclusively to the Dutch trader Paul Maashook. In return, Maashook would pay the miri (tax slated for funding the annual Hajj caravan), which was normally payable by the village shaykhs (chiefs). The Syrian Sufi teacher and traveler Mustafa al-Bakri al-Siddiqi (1688–1748/9), who traveled through the region in the first half of the 18th century, said that he prayed in the village after visiting the citadel of Atlit. In 1776 the village was used as a base by Ahmad Pasha al-Jazzar to suppress a revolt led by Ali al-Daher, one of the sons of Sheikh Daher al-Umar, who ruled the Galilee between 1730 and 1775.

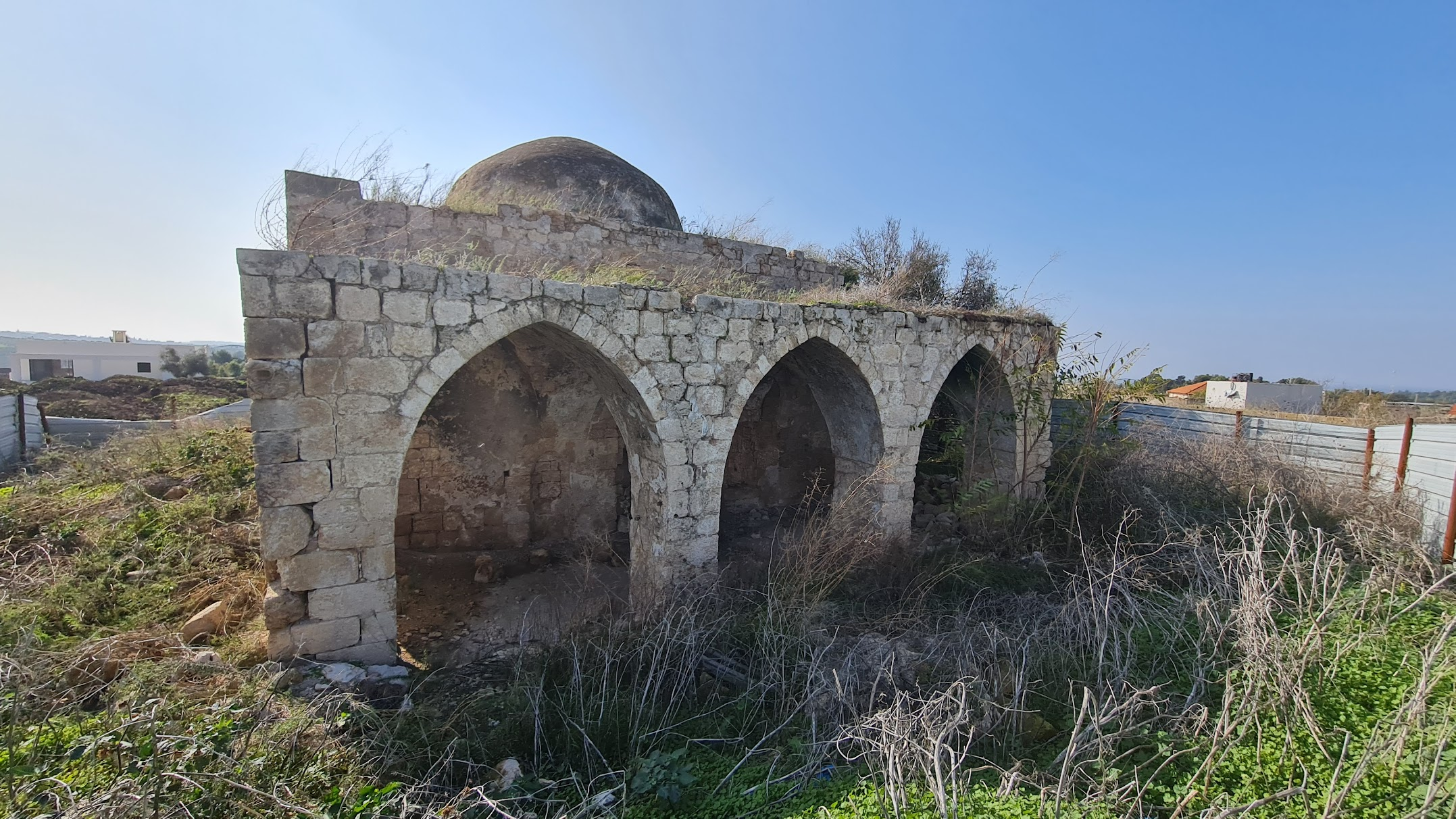
The village mosque of Amqa, likely dating to early 19th century

A map by Pierre Jacotin from Napoleon's invasion of 1799 showed the place, misnamed as El Mead, According to the Survey of Western Palestine, in the late 19th century, the village was built of stone, situated on a slight rise in a valley, surrounded by olive and fig trees, and arable land with a population of 300 Druze. According to Andrew Petersen, the Survey's description is accurate except for its characterization of its inhabitants as Druze—the villagers were Muslims who maintained a mosque likely dated to the time early 19th century and were described as Muslims by traveler Victor Guérin in 1875. In 1887, the Ottoman authorities built a school in Amqa. A population list from about 1887 showed that Amka had about 740 inhabitants, all Muslim.

=== British Mandate ===
Amqa عمقا 'Amqa
- Village
- Interactive map of Amqa
- Geopolitical entity: Mandatory Palestine
- Subdistrict: Acre
- Date of depopulation: 10–11 July 1948

Area
  - Total: 6,060 dunams (6.06 km^{2}; 2.34 sq mi)

Population (1945)
  - Total: 1,240
- Cause(s) of depopulation: Military assault by Yishuv forces
- Current Localities: Amka

In the 1922 census of Palestine conducted by the British Mandate authorities, Amqa had a population of 724 inhabitants, of whom 722 were Muslims and two Christians. The population increased in the 1931 census to 895, all Muslims, living in a total of 212 houses.

In 1945, the population of Amqa was 1,240 Muslims, with over 6,000 dunums (1,500 acres) of land according to an official land and population survey. Of this, 1,648 dunams were plantations and irrigable land; 3,348 used for cereals, while 36 dunams were built-up (urban) land.

=== Israel ===
People from neighboring villages began to seek refuge in 'Amqa in May 1948. The village was attacked on 10-11 July by the Sheva' (Seventh) Brigade and the First Battalion of the Carmeli Brigade. It was captured on 16 July 1948 during Operation Dekel and largely destroyed, with the exception of the school and mosque. Many of the inhabitants became internally displaced Palestinians living in other villages in Israel. On 1 March 1949 a UN observer reported a large group of villagers from 'Amqa seeking refuge in Salim. Another group arrived on 26 March. In February 1950, the village was declared a closed area. The Arab population remained under Martial Law until 1966.

In 1949, the Jewish National Fund created a settlement north of the ruins of Amka. The elementary school for boys founded in 1887 and the village mosque remained untouched although other structures were razed in the late 1950s. According to Petersen, the mosque and school were used as warehouses.

== Archaeological sites ==
Three khirbas (archaeological ruins) lay within Amka's vicinity and contain the foundations of buildings, well-chiseled building stones, presses, and a cistern. During archaeological searches of the area remnants of a Byzantine church were discovered but due to the destruction of the village no foundations could be established. The Amka mosque was inspected by Petersen in 1991. The date of the mosque construction is not known, but it bears a general similarity to the nearby mosque of al-Ghabisiyya, and is probably of a similar age, i.e. early 19th century.

== Demographics ==
The village had a population of 215 in 1596. The population was 894 people across 212 houses in 1931, and 1,240 people in 1944. There were 6,068 dunums of land ownership in the village in 1944, with 6,060 being Arab and 8 being publicly held.

== See also ==
- Depopulated Palestinian locations in Israel

== Bibliography ==
- Barag, Dan (1979). "A new source concerning the ultimate borders of the Latin Kingdom of Jerusalem". Israel Exploration Journal. 29 (3/4): 197–217. JSTOR 27925726.
- Barron, J.B., ed. (1923). Palestine: Report and General Abstracts of the Census of 1922. Government of Palestine.
- Cohen, A. (1973), Palestine in the Eighteenth Century: Patterns of Government and Administration. Hebrew University, Jerusalem. Cited in Petersen, (2001)
- Conder, C.R.; Kitchener, H.H. (1881). The Survey of Western Palestine: Memoirs of the Topography, Orography, Hydrography, and Archaeology. Vol. 1. London: Committee of the Palestine Exploration Fund.
- Department of Statistics (1945). Village Statistics, April, 1945. Government of Palestine.
- Ellenblum, R. (2003). Frankish Rural Settlement in the Latin Kingdom of Jerusalem. Cambridge University Press. ISBN 9780521521871.
- Frankel, Rafael (1988). "Topographical notes on the territory of Acre in the Crusader period". Israel Exploration Journal. 38 (4): 249–272. JSTOR 27926125.
- Guérin, V. (1880). Description Géographique Historique et Archéologique de la Palestine (in French). Vol. 3: Galilee, pt. 2. Paris: L'Imprimerie Nationale. (p.23)
- Hadawi, S. (1970). Village Statistics of 1945: A Classification of Land and Area ownership in Palestine. Palestine Liberation Organization Research Center. Archived from the original on 2018-12-08.
- Hütteroth, W.-D.; Abdulfattah, K. (1977). Historical Geography of Palestine, Transjordan and Southern Syria in the Late 16th Century. Erlanger Geographische Arbeiten, Sonderband 5. Erlangen, Germany: Vorstand der Fränkischen Geographischen Gesellschaft. ISBN 978-3-920405-41-4.
- Karmon, Y. (1960). "An Analysis of Jacotin's Map of Palestine" (PDF). Israel Exploration Journal. 10 (3, 4): 155–173, 244–253. Archived from the original (PDF) on 2019-12-22.
- Khalidi, Walid, ed. (1992). All That Remains: The Palestinian Villages Occupied and Depopulated by Israel in 1948. Institute for Palestine Studies. ISBN 9780887283062.
- Mills, E., ed. (1932). Census of Palestine 1931. Population of Villages, Towns and Administrative Areas. Jerusalem: Government of Palestine.
- Morris, B. (1993). Israel's Border Wars, 1949 - 1956. Arab Infiltration, Israeli Retaliation, and the Countdown to the Suez War. Oxford University Press. ISBN 978-0-19-827850-4.
- Morris, B. (1987). The Birth of the Palestinian refugee problem, 1947-1949. Cambridge University Press. ISBN 978-0-521-33028-2.
- Morris, B. (2004). The Birth of the Palestinian Refugee Problem Revisited. Cambridge University Press. ISBN 978-0-521-00967-6.
- Nazzal, Nafez (1978). The Palestinian Exodus from Galilee 1948. Beirut: The Institute for Palestine Studies. ISBN 9780887281280.
- Palmer, E. H. (1881). The Survey of Western Palestine: Arabic and English Name Lists Collected During the Survey by Lieutenants Conder and Kitchener, R. E. Transliterated and Explained by E.H. Palmer. Committee of the Palestine Exploration Fund.
- Petersen, Andrew (2001). A Gazetteer of Buildings in Muslim Palestine (British Academy Monographs in Archaeology). Vol. 1. Oxford University Press. ISBN 978-0-19-727011-0.
- Rhode, H. (1979). Administration and Population of the Sancak of Safed in the Sixteenth Century. Columbia University. Archived from the original on 2020-03-01.
- Rogan, E. (2001). The War for Palestine: Rewriting the History of 1948. Cambridge: Cambridge University Press. ISBN 978-0-521-79476-3.
- Röhricht, R. (1893). (RRH) Regesta regni Hierosolymitani (MXCVII-MCCXCI) (in Latin). Berlin: Libraria Academica Wageriana.
- Schumacher, G. (1888). "Population list of the Liwa of Akka". Quarterly Statement - Palestine Exploration Fund. 20: 169–191.
- Strehlke, E., ed. (1869). Tabulae Ordinis Theutonici ex tabularii regii Berolinensis codice potissimum. Berlin: Weidmanns.

== External links and references ==
- Welcome To 'Amqa
- 'Amqa, Zochrot
- Survey of Western Palestine, Map 3: IAA, Wikimedia commons
- 3amqa, Dr. Moslih Kanaaneh
