= Acre Subdistrict =

Coordinates: 32°55′0″N 35°9′50″E

Acre Subdistrict נפת עכו قضاء عكا
- Subdistrict
- Northern District in blue, with Acre Subdistrict in dark blue
- Interactive map of Acre Subdistrict
- Country: Israel
- District: Northern

Area
  - Total: 928 km^{2} (358 sq mi)

Population (2024)
  - Total: 692,000

Ethnicity
  - Jews and others: 34.6%
  - Arabs: 65.4%

The Acre Subdistrict, alternatively spelt as Akko Subdistrict (based on Hebrew name) or Akka Subdistrict (based on Arabic name), is one of Israel's sub-districts in the Northern District. Despite the subdistrict's name, the largest city in the subdistrict is Nahariya, with 68,000 people as of 2024.

== History ==
The subdistrict is mostly composed of what had been, during British-ruled Mandatory Palestine, the Acre Subdistrict.

== Demographics ==
Historical population
Year	Pop.	±%
1972	173,500	—
1983	248,300	+43.1%
1995	385,600	+55.3%
2008	553,300	+43.5%
2022	666,769	+20.5%
2024	692,085	+3.8%

== Administrative local authorities ==
Cities	Local Councils	Regional Councils
Acre; Arraba; Karmiel; Ma'alot-Tarshiha; Nahariyya; Sakhnin; Shefa-'Amr; Tamra	Abu Sinan; Beit Jann; Bi'ina; Bir al-Maksur; Bu'eine Nujeidat; Deir al-Asad; Deir Hanna; Fassuta; Hurfeish; I'billin; Jadeidi-Makr; Julis; Kabul; Kafr Manda; Kafr Yasif; Kaukab Abu al-Hija; Kfar Vradim; Kisra-Sumei; Majd al-Krum; Mazra'a; Mi'ilya; Nahf; Peki'in; Rameh; Sajur; Sha'ab; Shlomi; Yanuh-Jat; Yarka	Ma'ale Yosef; Matte Asher; Merom HaGalil (part); Misgav; Upper Galilee (part)

== Voting Patterns ==
In the 2022 election, 49 percent of voters in the subdistrict voted for the Arab parties, while 28 percent voted for the parties of the center-left coalition led by Yair Lapid and 23 percent voted for the parties of the right-wing coalition led by Benjamin Netanyahu.

In the 2026 election, 53 percent of voters in the subdistrict voted for the Arab parties, while 26 percent voted for the parties of the center-left coalition led by Gadi Eisenkot and 19 percent voted for the parties of the right-wing coalition led by Benjamin Netanyahu. An additional 1.3 percent voted for the Reservists, and 1 percent voted for Amcha Yisrael. Voter turnout increased 33 percent from the 2022 election.

== Natural Regions ==
Districts, Subdistricts and Natural Regions of the State of Israel, 2018

- 241 Shefar’am
  - Population (2024): 237,934
  - Largest city: Shefa-Amr
- 242 Karmi'el
  - Population (2024): 124,110
  - Largest city: Karmiel
- 243 Yehi'am
  - Population (2024): 107,395
  - Largest city: Ma'alot-Tarshiha
- 244 Elon
  - Population (2024): 23,282
  - Largest city: Hurfeish
- 245 Nahariyya
  - Population (2024): 119,958
  - Largest city: Nahariya
- 246 Akko
  - Population (2024): 79,406
  - Largest city: Acre
