= Netiv =

Netiv, a Hebrew word meaning path, may refer to the following places in Israel:

- Netiv HaGdud
- Netiv HaLamed-Heh
- Netiv HaShayara
- Netiv HaAsara
- Netiv Ha’avot

== See also ==
- Netivot
