= Al-Ghabisiyya =

Al-Ghabisiyya الغابسية El Ghabsiyeh
- Etymology: from ghabus, "dusky, ashen, grey"
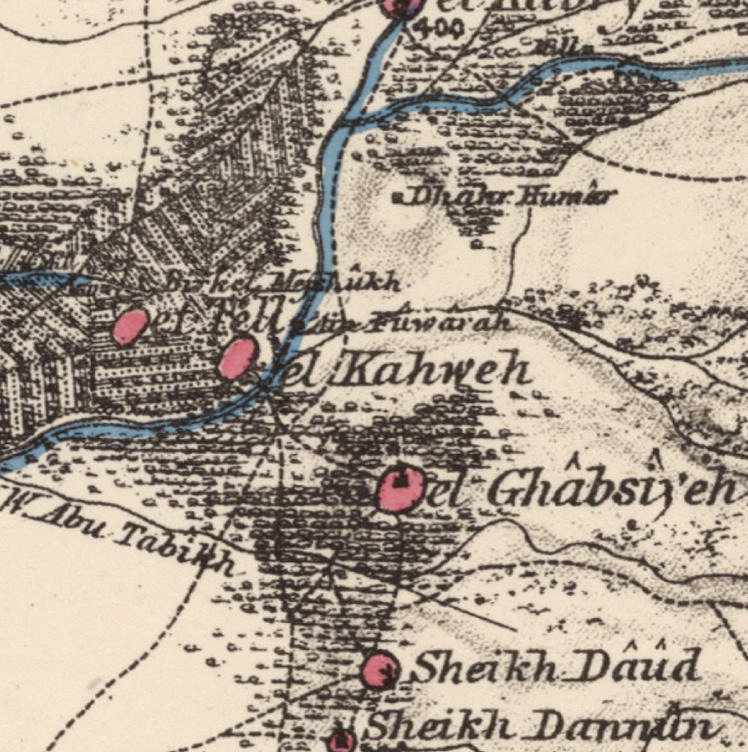
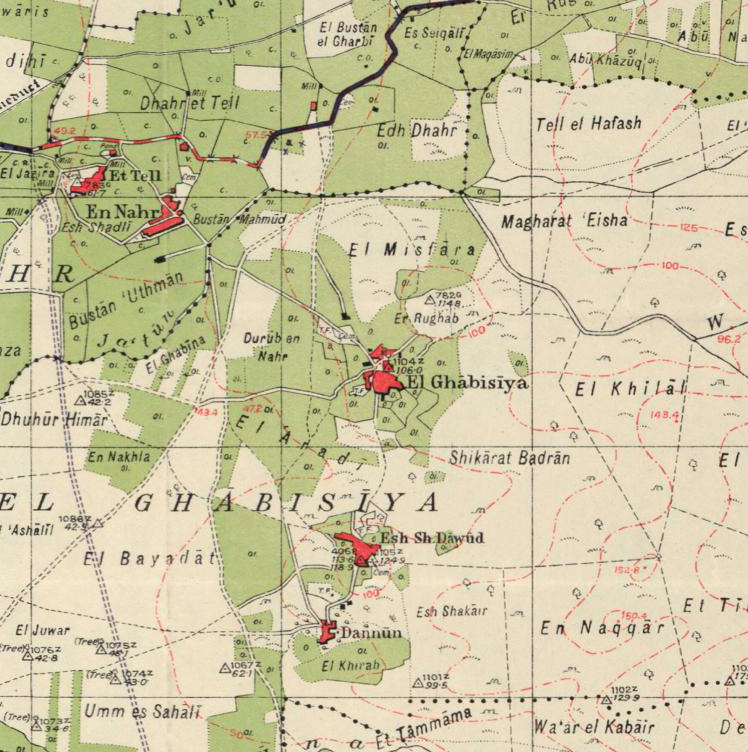
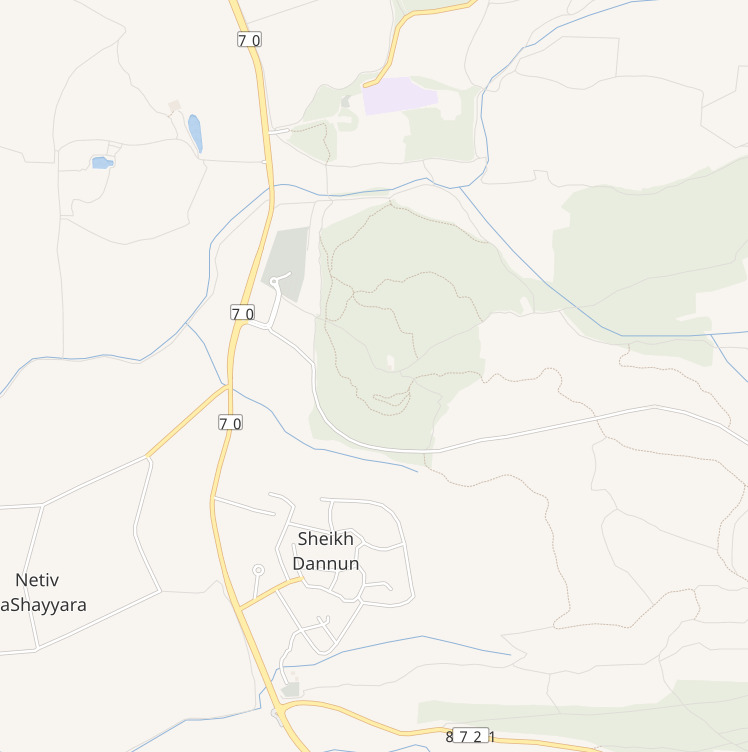
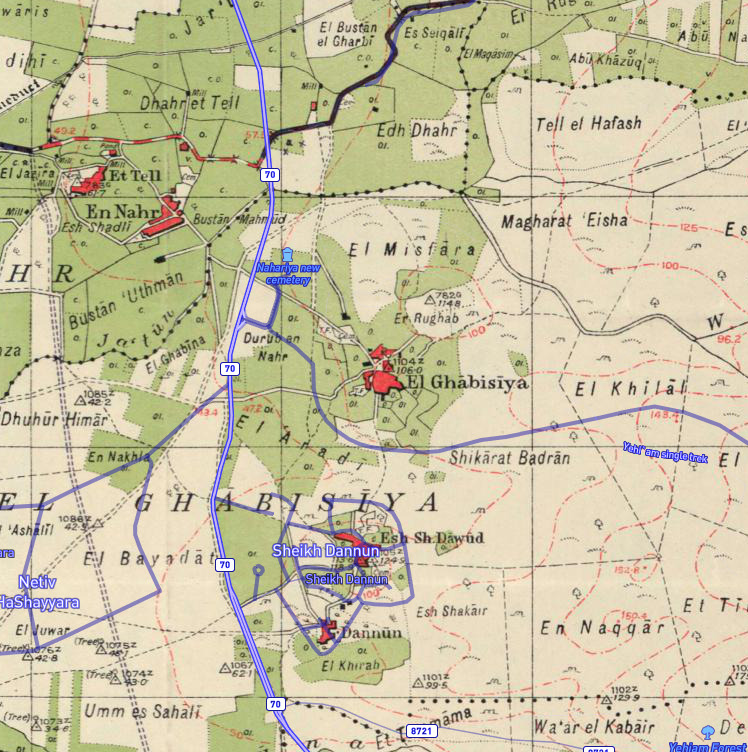
- 1870s map 1940s map modern map 1940s with modern overlay map A series of historical maps of the area around Al-Ghabisiyya (click the buttons)

- Location within Mandatory Palestine
- Coordinates: 33°00′02″N 35°09′00″E
- Palestine grid: 164/267
- Geopolitical entity: Mandatory Palestine
- Subdistrict: Acre
- Date of depopulation: May 1948, 1949

Area
  - Total: 11.8 km^{2} (4.6 sq mi)

Population (1945)
  - Total: 690
- Cause(s) of depopulation: Expulsion by Yishuv forces
- Current Localities: Netiv HaShayara

Al-Ghabisiyya was a Palestinian Arab village in northern Palestine, 16 km north-east of Acre in present-day Israel. It was depopulated by the Israel Defense Forces during the 1948 Palestinian expulsion and remains deserted.

== History ==
A wine press, dating to the Bronze Age, has been found at Al-Ghabisiyya. Other remains, suggesting that the place might have had a Roman and Byzantine settlement have also been discovered. One Corinthian capital was observed there in the 19th century.

During the Crusader period the site was known as La Gabasie and was one of the fiefs of Casal Imbert. It was described as part of the domain of the Crusaders during the hudna ("truce") between the Crusaders based in Acre and the Mamluk sultan al-Mansur Qalawun in 1283.

=== Ottoman era ===
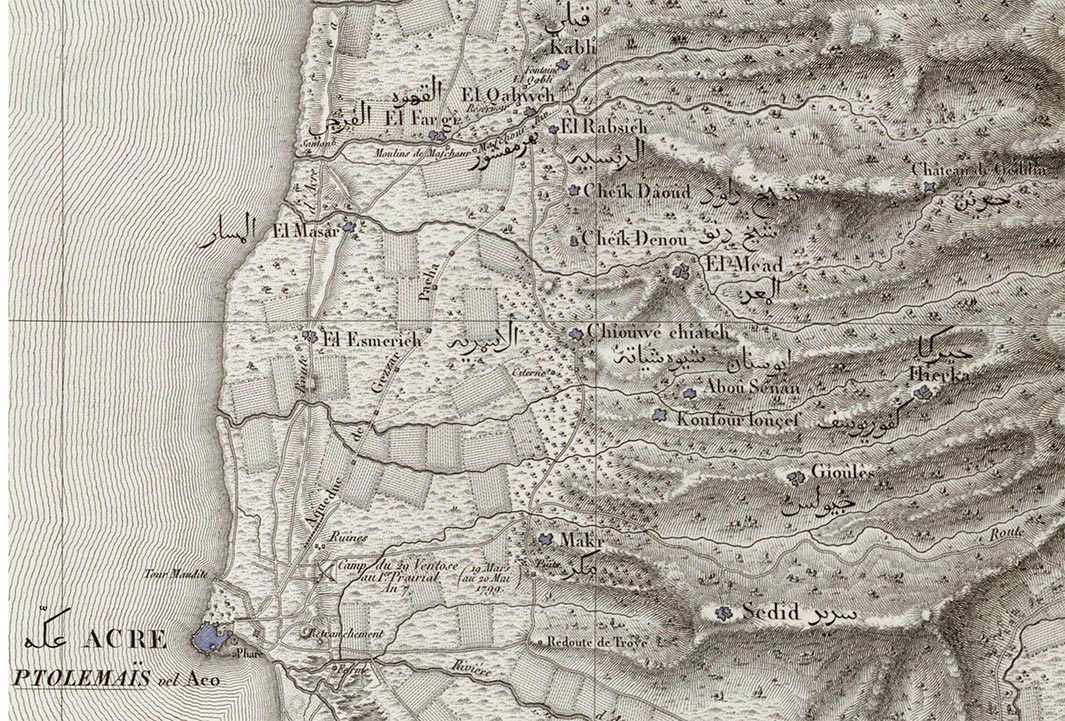
French map of the area, in 1799. "El Rabsieh" corresponds to Al-Ghabisiyya, in the map of Pierre Jacotin.

The village corresponds to that of Ghabiyya in the nahiya (subdistrict) of Akka, part of Sanjak Safad, in the 1596 C.E. Ottoman tax register. This village had a population of 58 households (khana) and 2 bachelors (mujarrad), all Moslem. They paid a fixed tax-rate of 25% on agricultural products, including wheat, barley, fruit trees, cotton, and water buffalo; a total of 6,334 akçe. 14/24 of the revenue went to a Waqf.

A map by Pierre Jacotin from Napoleon's invasion of 1799 showed the place, named as El Rabsieh. The village mosque dates from the time of Ali Pasha al-Khazindar, father of Abdullah Pasha (i.e. some time before 1818 CE). French explorer Victor Guérin visited the village, which he called "El-Rhabsieh", in 1875. In 1881, the PEF's Survey of Western Palestine (SWP) described al-Ghabisiyya as "a village, built of stone, containing about 150 Moslems, on the edge of the plain, surrounded by olives, figs, pomegranate and gardens; a stream of water near, plentiful of water."

A population list from about 1887 showed that Al-Ghabisiyya had about 390 inhabitants, all Muslim.

=== British Mandate era ===
At the time of the 1922 census of Palestine conducted by the British Mandate, Al-Ghabisiyya had a population of 427, all Muslims, increasing in the 1931 census to 470, still Muslims, in a total of 125 houses.

The population grew to 690 in the 1945 statistics, still all Muslim. Together with the nearby villages of Shaykh Dannun and Shaykh Dawud, the village had 11,771 dunums of land in 1945. The local economy was based on livestock and agriculture. In 1944/45 a total of 6,633 dunums of land in the three villages was used for cereals, 1,371 dunums were irrigated or used for orchards, and 58 dunams were built-up (urban) land. 300 dunums in Ghabisiyya were planted with olive trees.

=== 1948 war and depopulation ===
The village was in the territory allotted to the Arab state under the 1947 UN Partition Plan. Like many Arab villages, it had a non-aggression pact with nearby Jewish communities. In the early months of the 1948 Arab-Israeli War, the villagers provided the Jewish militia Haganah with intelligence and ammunition in return for an agreement to not enter the village or harm the inhabitants. Despite these agreements, on May 21, 1948, the Haganah's Carmeli Brigade attacked al-Ghabisiyya as part of Operation Ben-Ami. The Carmeli troops "entered the village with guns blazing", killing a number of Palestinians, in what historian Saleh Abdel Jawad calls a massacre. (Note: Benvenisti 2000, "The inhabitants of the village of Ghabisiyya, situated to the south of al-Kabri, maintained close ties with their Jewish neighbors and had even signed an agreement to provide information to them, in return for which the Jewish forces undertook not to enter the village or harm its residents. In spite of the agreement, the village was occupied, eleven of its inhabitants were killed, and the remainder fled and found shelter in neighboring villages.") Six villagers may have been executed under suspicion of participating in the Yehiam convoy attack. (Note: Morris 2004, "The villagers, who had helped the Haganah during the first months of the war, formally surrendered but Carmeli troops entered the village with guns blazing, killing a handful; six more appear to have been selected and executed in a nearby ditch after the conquest, apparently in revenge for alleged participation in the ambush of the ‘Yehiam Convoy’, in March 1948, in which 47 Haganah men had died.")

The villagers fled or were expelled to nearby villages, where they remained until the complete Jewish conquest of the Galilee in October. At that time, many of the residents went to Lebanon while others fled to nearby Arab towns and became Israeli citizens due to their registration in the October–November census. The latter tried repeatedly to settle back in their village. Some apparently obtained permission but others went back illegally. On January 24, 1950, the Military Governor of the Galilee ordered all the residents of al-Ghabisiyya to leave within 48 hours and then declared the village a closed military area. No alternative accommodation had been arranged, and the villagers took up temporary residence in abandoned houses of nearby Shaykh Dawud and Sheikh Danun.

The expulsion caused a public controversy. The leaders of the leftist Mapam party condemned it, but they were undermined by the Mapam-dominated regional Jewish settlements bloc (one Mapam kibbutz of which was already cultivating al-Ghabisiyya's land) which declared that the "Arabs of Ghabisiyya should on no account be allowed to return to their village". In September 1950, some of the villagers again resettled the village but were sentenced to several months in prison and given fines.

=== State of Israel ===
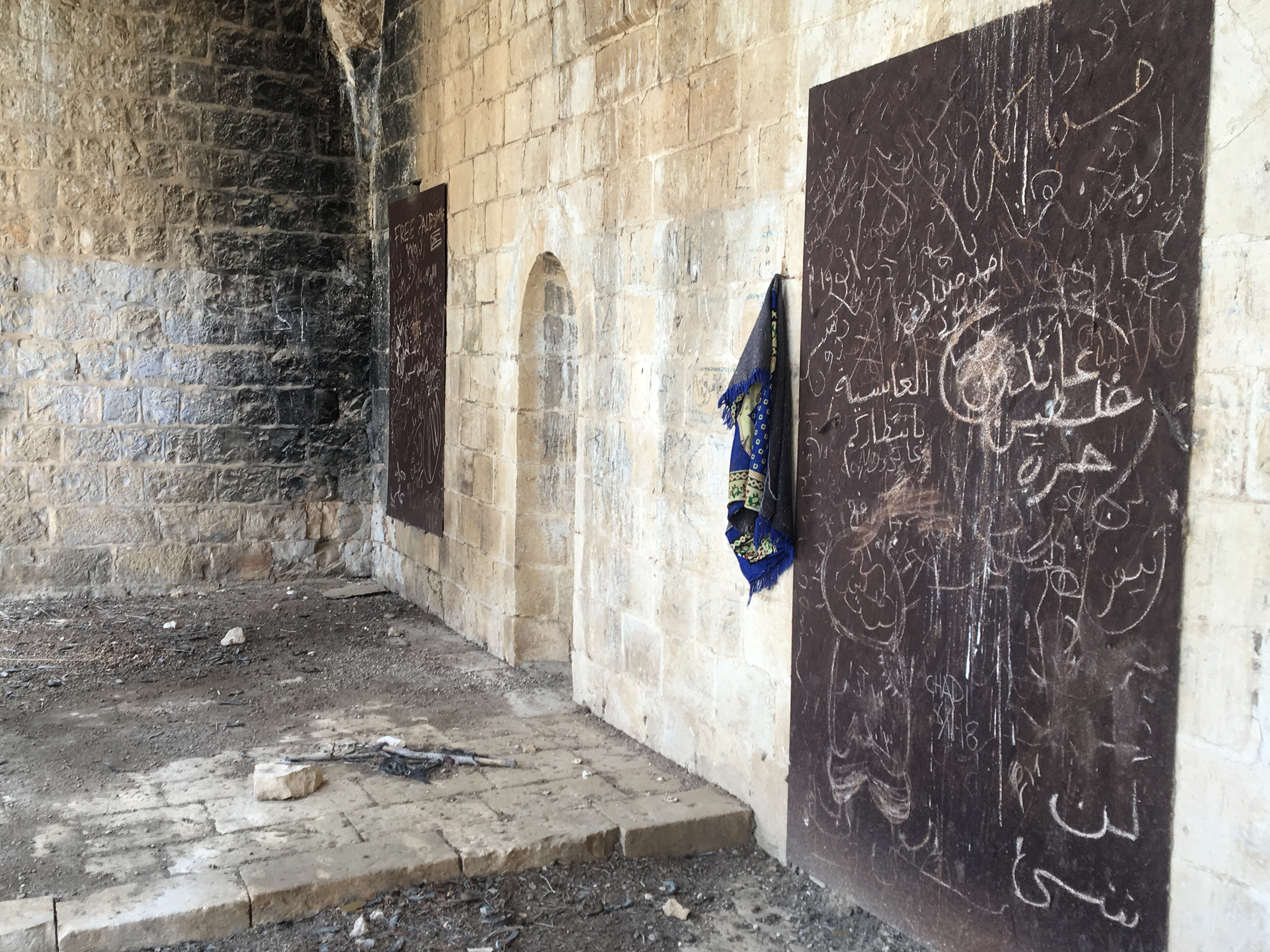
Building remains in Al-Ghabisiyya, 2019

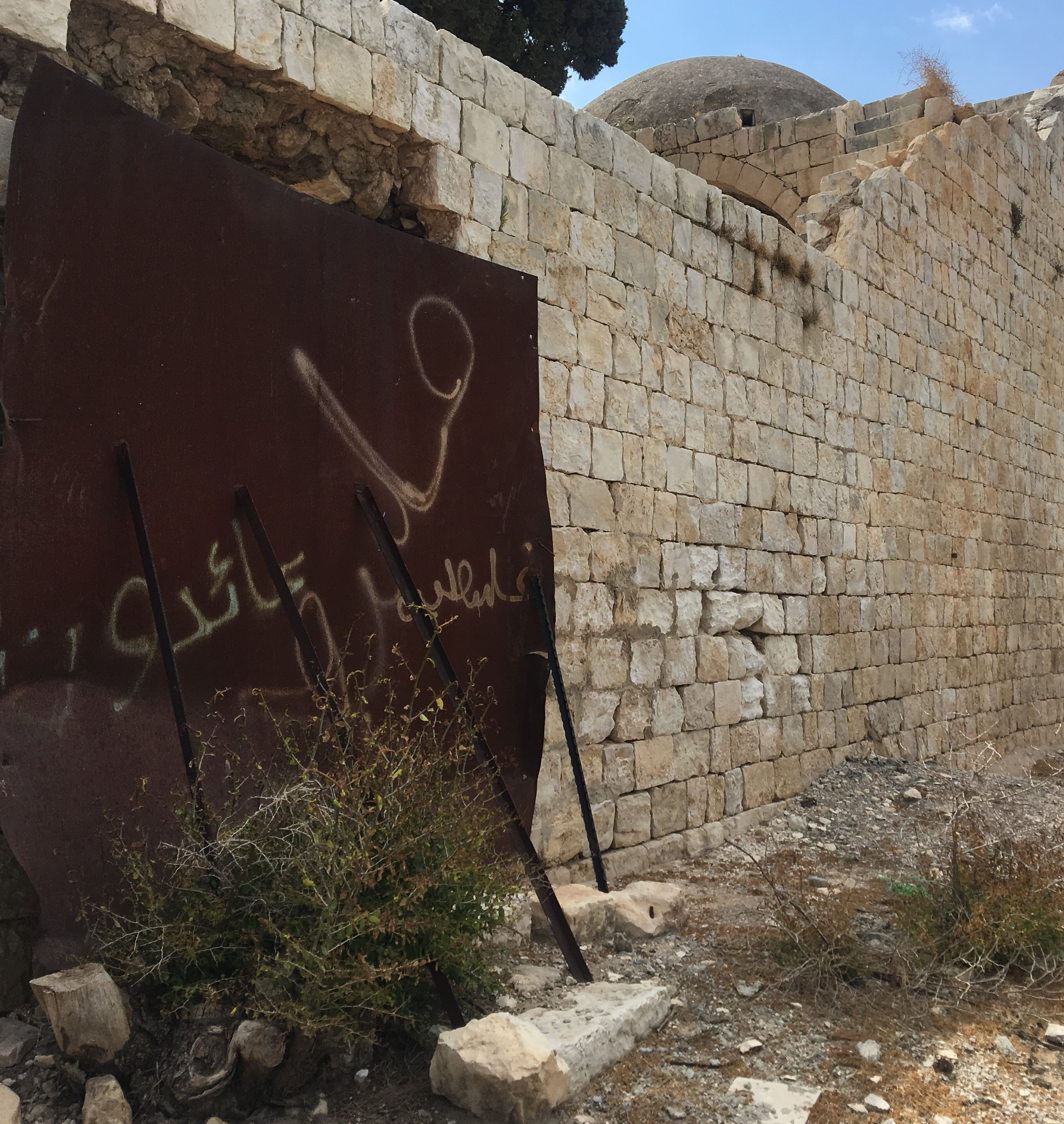
Building remains in Al-Ghabisiyya, 2019

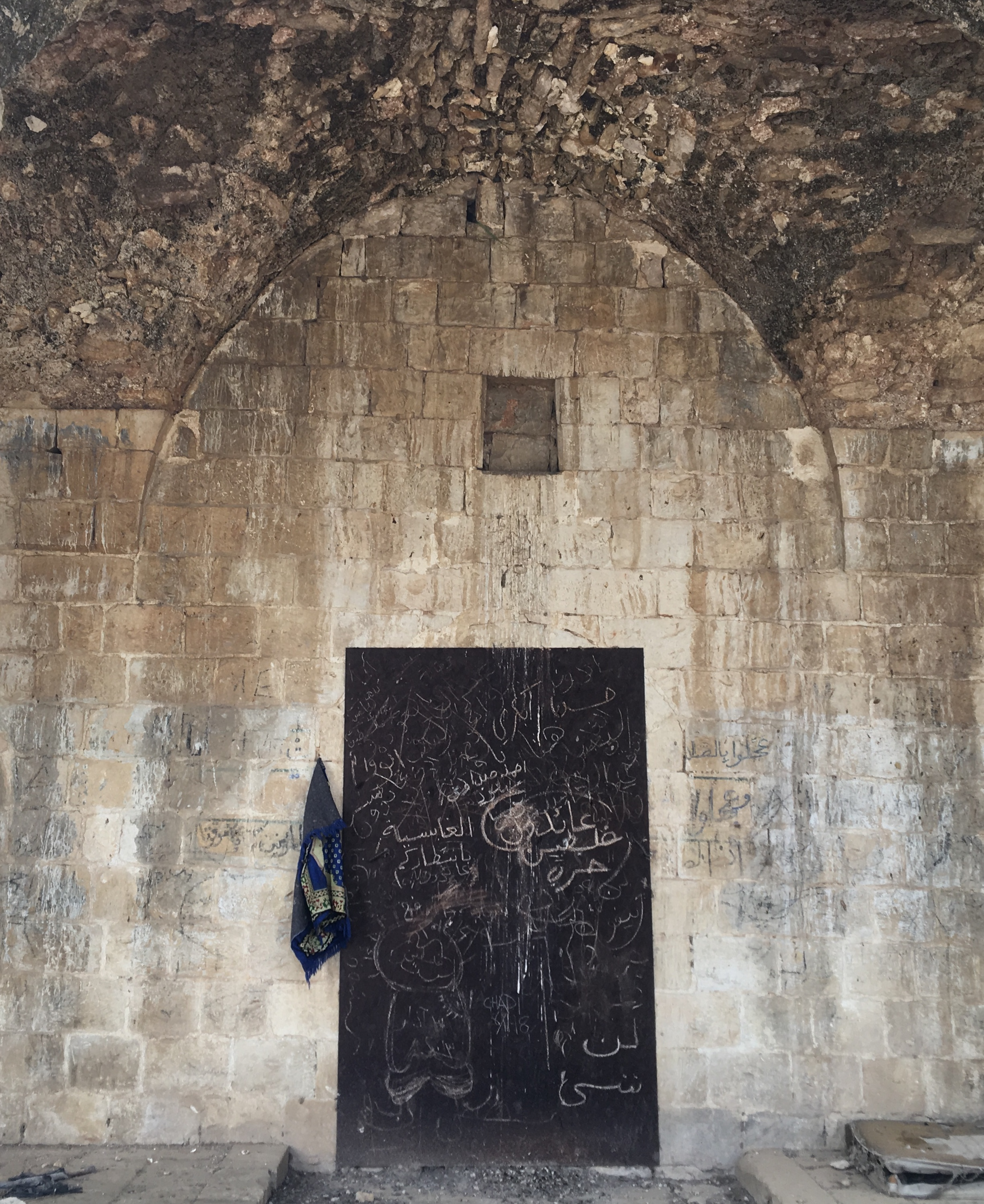
Remains of the mosque in Al-Ghabisiyya, 2019

In 1951, the villagers instituted proceedings against the Military Government in the High Court of Israel. The court ruled that the declaration of the village as a closed area had been improperly instituted, and in consequence "the military governor had no authority to evict the petitioners [from the village] and he has no authority to prevent them from entering or leaving it or from residing there." The military government responded by sealing the village, and two days later again declared it to be a closed military area. The villagers appealed to the High Court again, but the court ruled that the new declaration was legal and in consequence villagers who had not managed to return to the village before that declaration (which in practice was all of them) were forbidden to go there without permission. The village thus remained deserted. Its lands were officially expropriated and in 1955 its houses were demolished leaving only the large mosque. Later attempts of the villagers to return to the village were not successful. The villagers set up a committee whose principal activity was to renovate the village cemetery and mosque, and in July 1972 the committee wrote to the prime minister:

In the village a mosque and the cemetery remain.... The mosque is in a run-down state and the cemetery, where our relatives are buried, is neglected and overgrown with weeds to such an extent that it is impossible to identify the graves any more. Knowing that our state authorities have always taken care of the places of worship and cemeteries of all the ethnic communities,... [we ask] to be enabled to carry out repairs on the mosque and also to repair and fence the cemetery and put it in order.

The authorities did not permit the al-Ghabisiyya's residents to carry out the requested renovation of the mosque and cemetery. The land of the village, including the mosque, had been acquired by the Israel Land Administration (ILA) under one of the laws regarding land expropriation, and not the Ministry of Religion, which is responsible for holy places. In 1994 members of the village committee began renovating the mosque and praying there. In January 1996 the ILA sealed the entrance of the mosque, but the villagers broke through the fence and again used the mosque for prayers. The villagers appealed to Prime Minister Shimon Peres in April 1996, they received a reply on his behalf from one of his aides:

The government of Israel regards itself as obligated to maintain the holy places of all religions, including, of course, cemeteries and mosques sacred to Islam. The prime minister has stated to the heads of the Arab community, with whom he recently met, that the government would see to the renovation and the restoration of the dignity of mosques in abandoned villages, including the mosque in Ghabisiyya.

However, Shimon Peres was defeated in the next prime ministerial elections, and in March 1997 police surrounded the mosque and representatives from ILA removed copies of the Quran and prayer rugs and once again sealed the entrance of the mosque. The conflict was carried to the court in Acre, where the uprooted villagers contended that the government action was contrary to Israel's "Law of Preservation of Holy Places". The ILA challenged the villagers right to pray there, and used the illegal eviction of 1951 and the demolition of the village in 1955 as arguments to bolster its claim:

"The village of Ghabisiyya was abandoned by its inhabitants and destroyed during the War for Independence".... [the mosque..had stood].."lonely and neglected"..."and since it was in a run-down and unstable state that constituted a threat to the safety of those inside it, it was decided by the Ministry of Religions to seal it and fence it off.

The court declined to issue an injunction permitting worshippers back into the mosque. The Ghabisiyya villagers still pray in the field outside the sealed mosque.

== Gallery ==
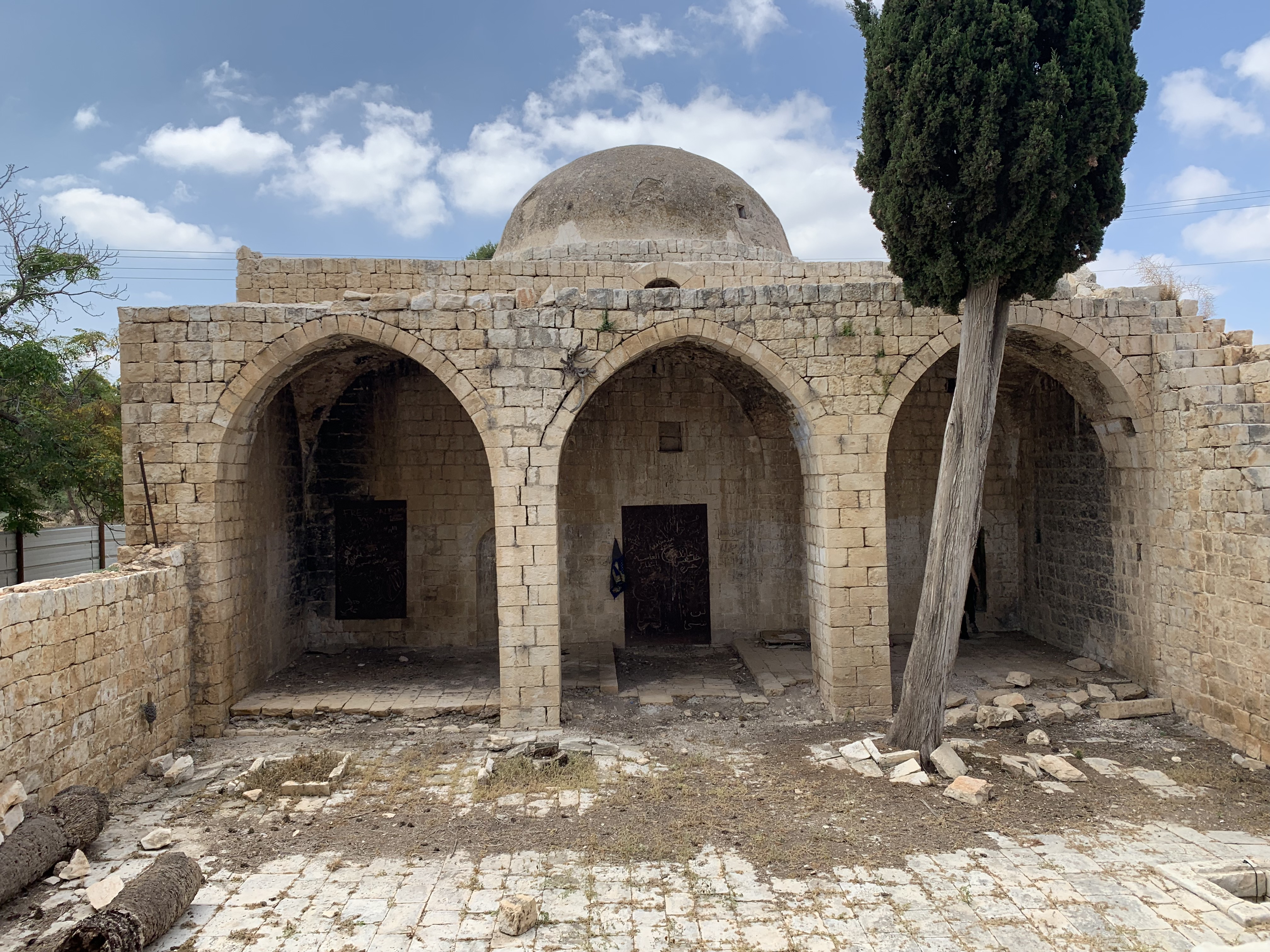

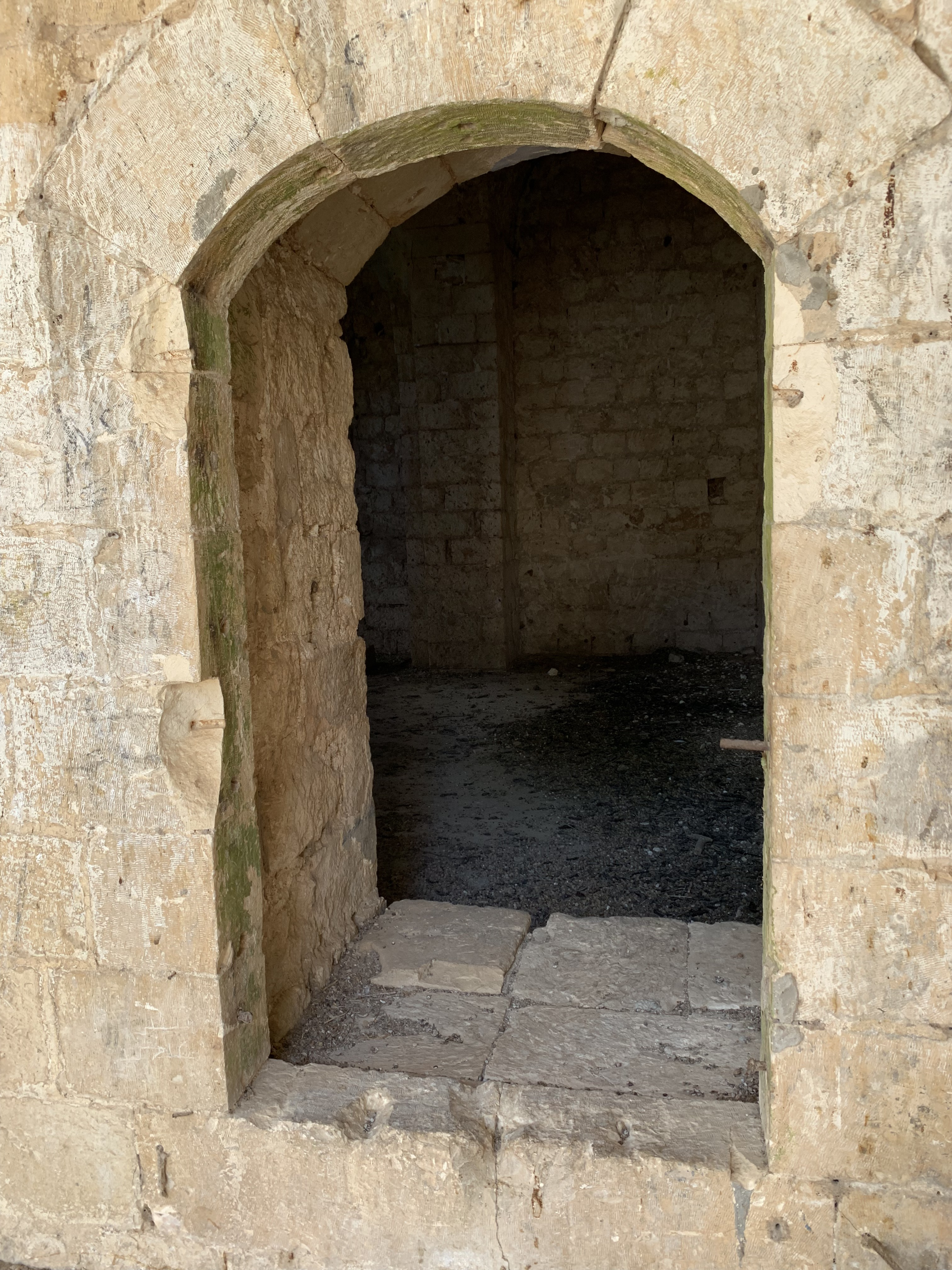

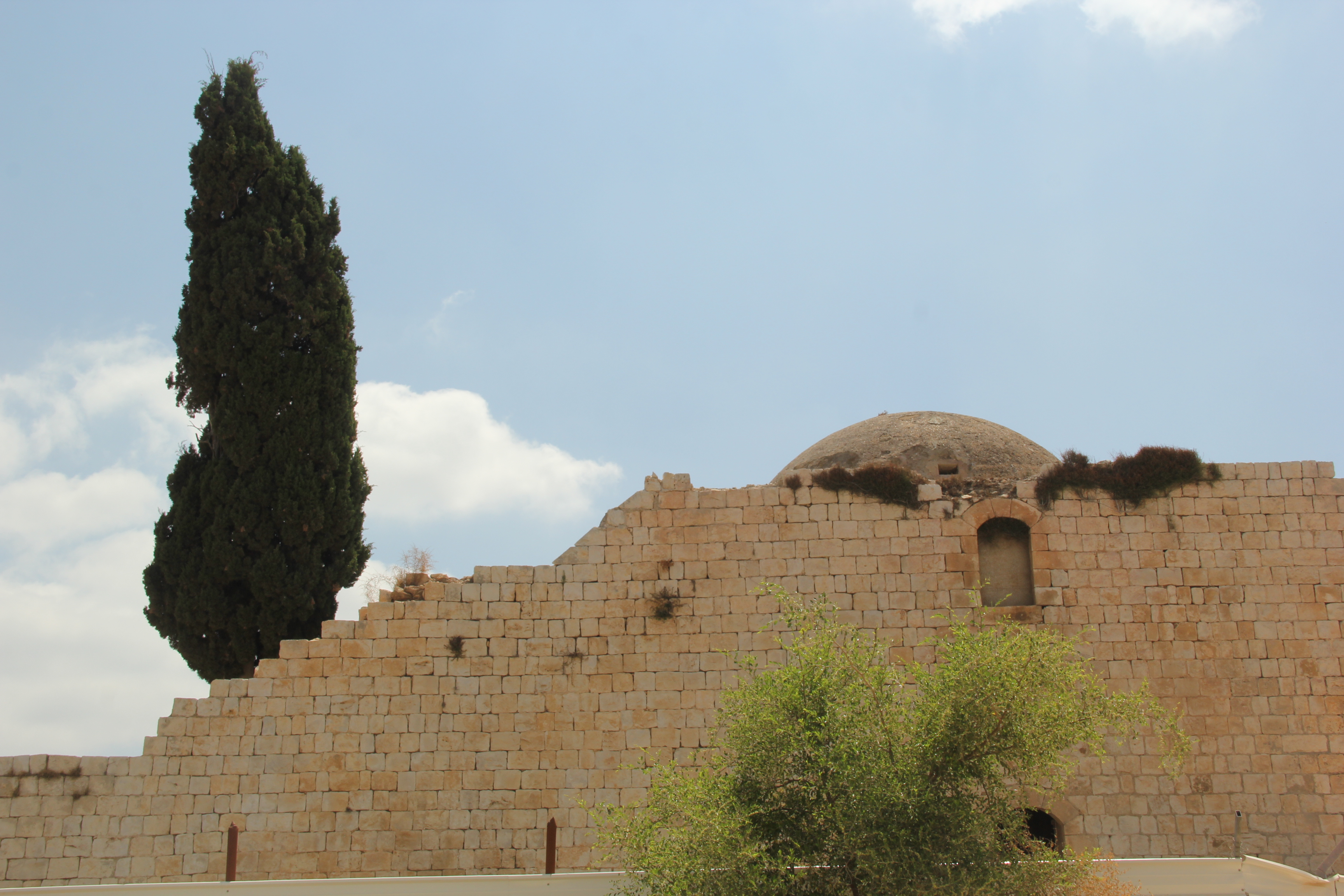

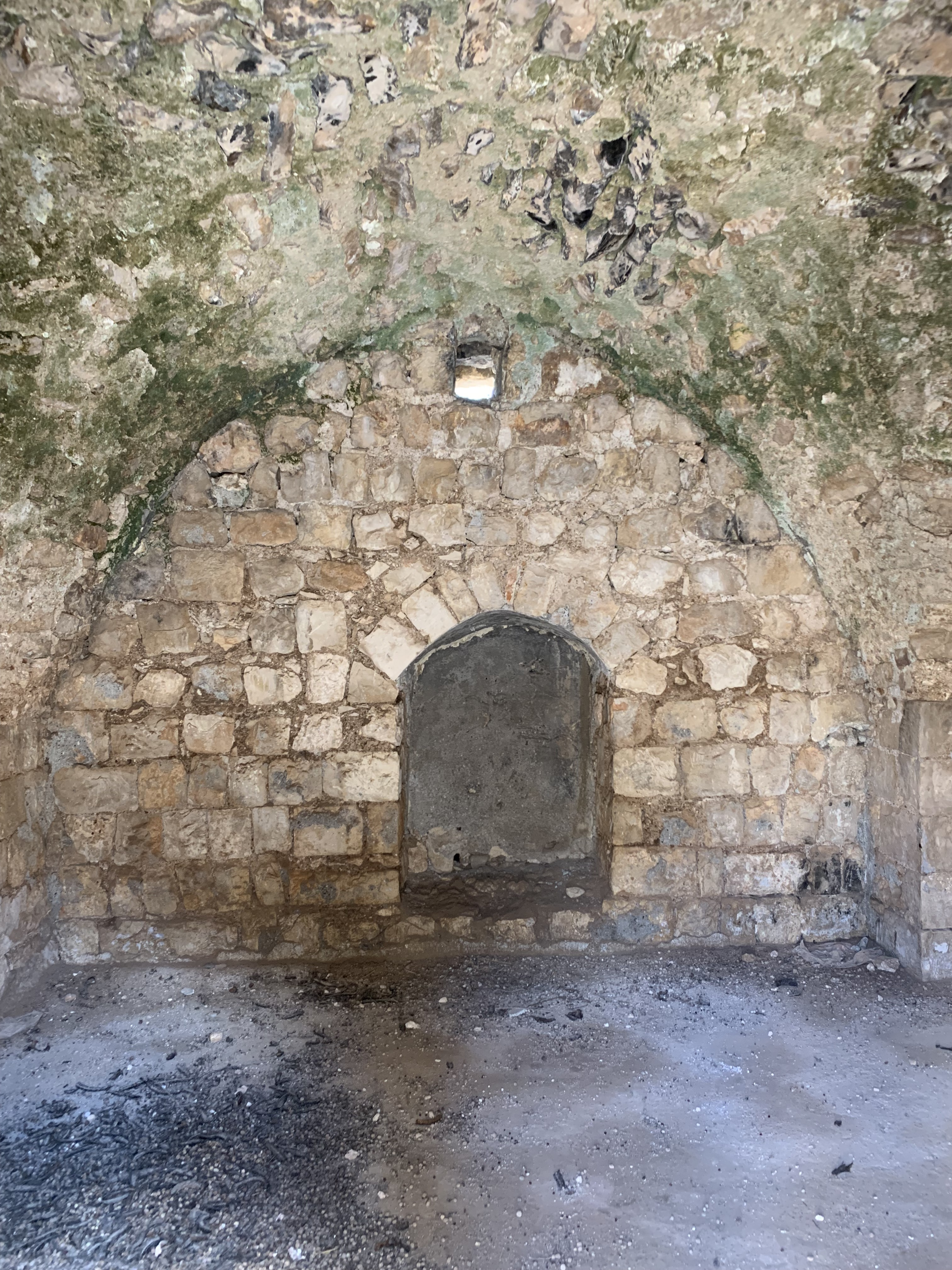

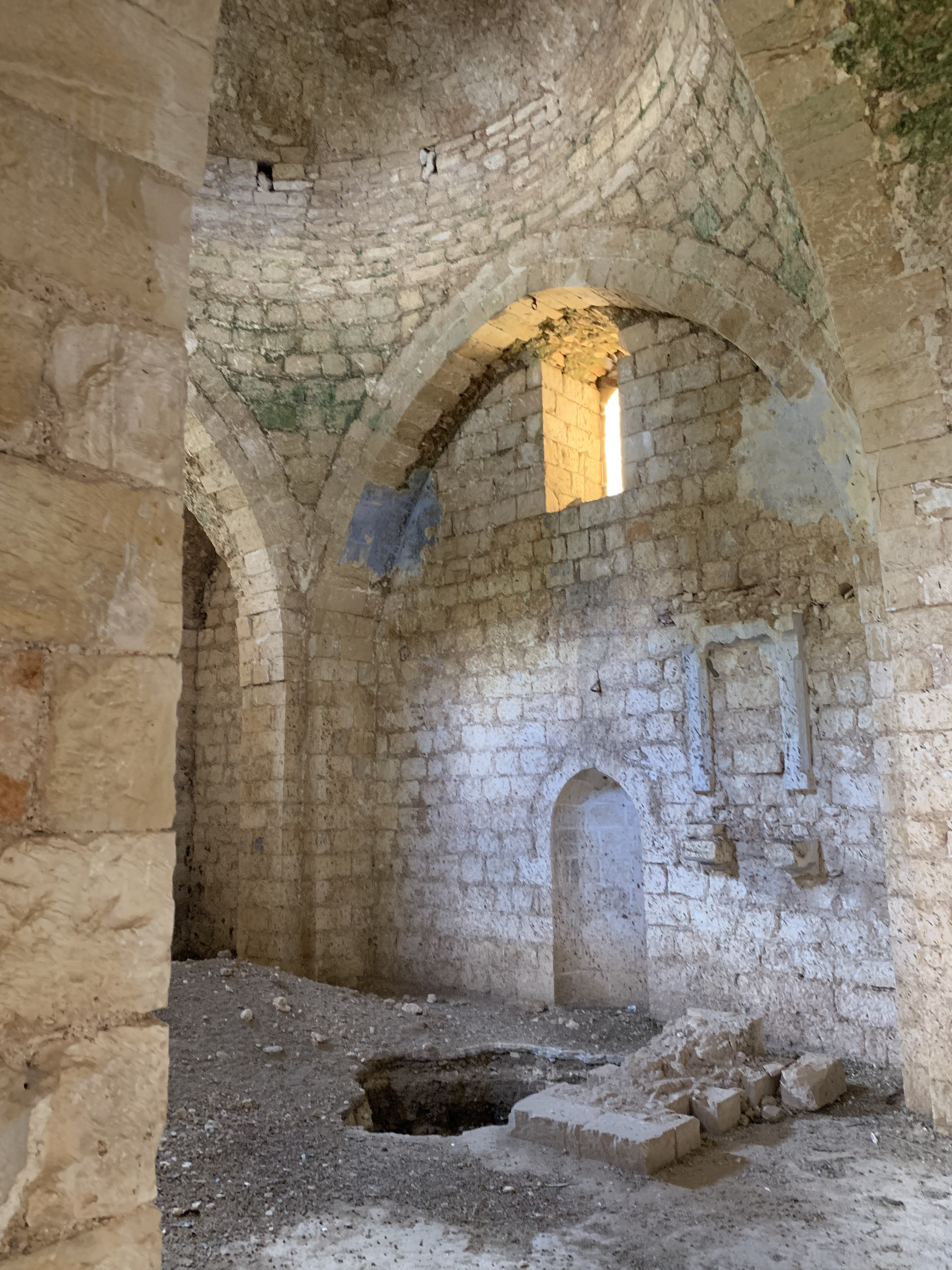

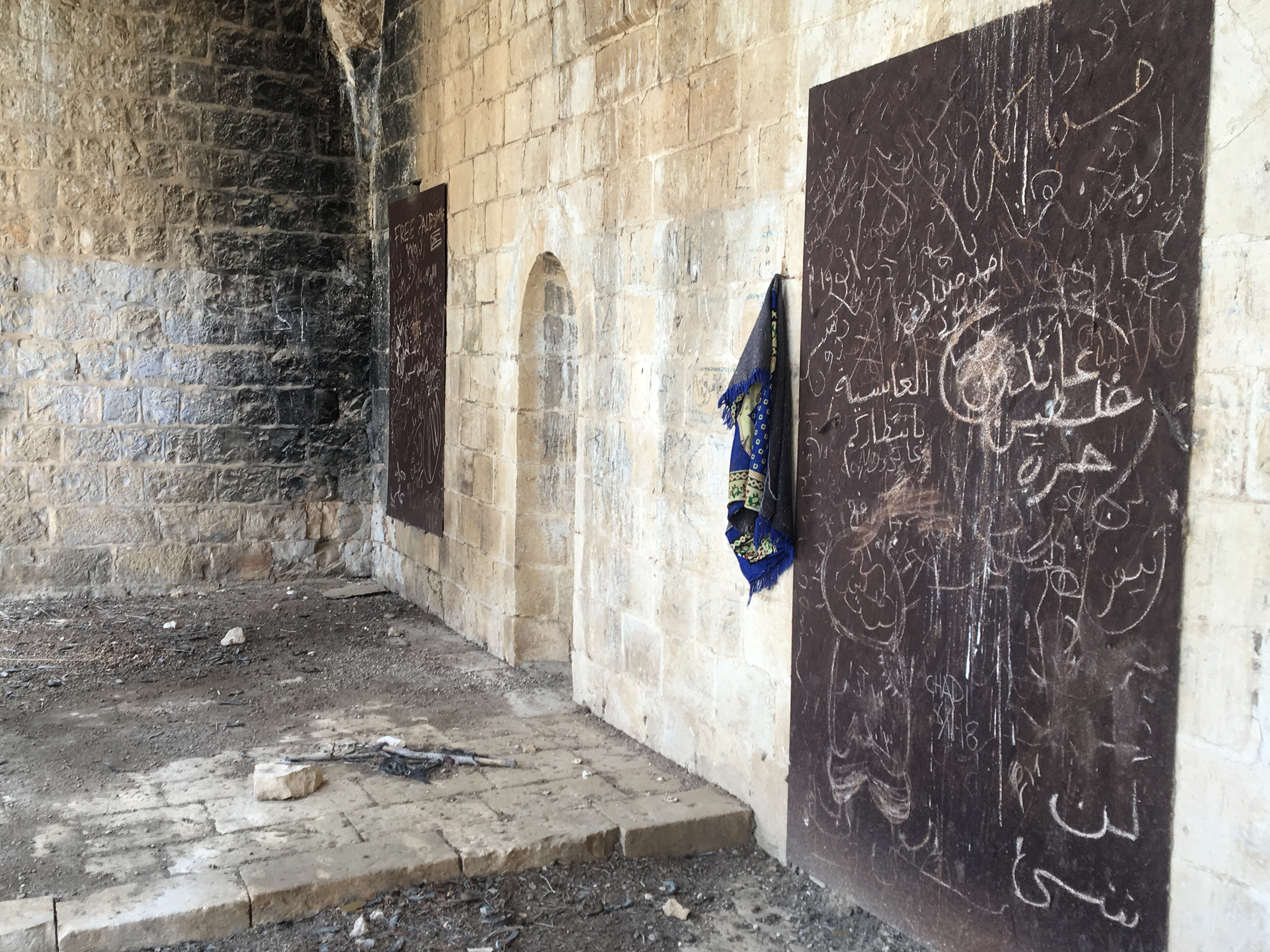

== See also ==
- Depopulated Palestinian locations in Israel
- List of villages depopulated during the Arab-Israeli conflict
- Internally Displaced Palestinians

== Bibliography ==
- Barron, J.B., ed. (1923). Palestine: Report and General Abstracts of the Census of 1922. Government of Palestine.
- Benveniśtî, M. (2000). Sacred landscape: the buried history of the Holy Land since 1948 (Illustrated ed.). University of California Press. ISBN 978-0-520-21154-4. p. 337
- Conder, C.R.; Kitchener, H.H. (1881). The Survey of Western Palestine: Memoirs of the Topography, Orography, Hydrography, and Archaeology. Vol. 1. London: Committee of the Palestine Exploration Fund.
- Frankel, Rafael (1988). "Topographical notes on the territory of Acre in the Crusader period". Israel Exploration Journal. 38 (4): 249–272. JSTOR 27926125.
- Gosker, Joppe (2012-03-26), "El-Ghabisiya l Report", Hadashot Arkheologiyot – Excavations and Surveys in Israel (124)
- Government of Palestine, Department of Statistics (1945). Village Statistics, April, 1945.
- Guérin, V. (1880). Description Géographique Historique et Archéologique de la Palestine (in French). Vol. 3: Galilee, pt. 2. Paris: L'Imprimerie Nationale.
- Hadawi, S. (1970). Village Statistics of 1945: A Classification of Land and Area ownership in Palestine. Palestine Liberation Organization Research Center. Archived from the original on 2018-12-08.
- Hütteroth, W.-D.; Abdulfattah, K. (1977). Historical Geography of Palestine, Transjordan and Southern Syria in the Late 16th Century. Erlanger Geographische Arbeiten, Sonderband 5. Erlangen, Germany: Vorstand der Fränkischen Geographischen Gesellschaft. ISBN 978-3-920405-41-4.
- Jiryis, S. (1973), The Legal Structure for the Expropriation and Absorption of Arab Lands in Israel, Journal of Palestine Studies, Vol. 2, No. 4, 82-104.
- Karmon, Y. (1960). "An Analysis of Jacotin's Map of Palestine" (PDF). Israel Exploration Journal. 10 (3, 4): 155–173, 244–253. Archived from the original (PDF) on 2019-12-22.
- Khamisy, Rabei G. (2014). "The Treaty of 1283 between Sultan Qalāwūn and the Frankish Authorities of Acre: A New Topographical Discussion". Israel Exploration Journal. 64, 1: 72–102.
- Khalidi, W. (1992). All That Remains: The Palestinian Villages Occupied and Depopulated by Israel in 1948. Washington D.C.: Institute for Palestine Studies. ISBN 978-0-88728-224-9.
- Mills, E., ed. (1932). Census of Palestine 1931. Population of Villages, Towns and Administrative Areas. Jerusalem: Government of Palestine.
- Morris, B. (2004). The Birth of the Palestinian Refugee Problem Revisited. Cambridge University Press. ISBN 978-0-521-00967-6.
- Nazzal, Nafez (1974), The Zionist occupation of western Galilee, 1948, Journal of Palestine Studies, Vol. 3, No. 3, 58-76.
- Palmer, E.H. (1881). The Survey of Western Palestine: Arabic and English Name Lists Collected During the Survey by Lieutenants Conder and Kitchener, R. E. Transliterated and Explained by E.H. Palmer. Committee of the Palestine Exploration Fund.
- Petersen, Andrew (2001). A Gazetteer of Buildings in Muslim Palestine (British Academy Monographs in Archaeology). Vol. 1. Oxford University Press. ISBN 978-0-19-727011-0. Archived from the original on 2021-05-29.
- Rhode, H. (1979). Administration and Population of the Sancak of Safed in the Sixteenth Century (PhD). Columbia University. Archived from the original on 2020-03-01.
- Röhricht, R. (1893). (RRH) Regesta regni Hierosolymitani (MXCVII-MCCXCI) (in Latin). Berlin: Libraria Academica Wageriana.
- Schumacher, G. (1888). "Population list of the Liwa of Akka". Quarterly Statement - Palestine Exploration Fund. 20: 169–191.
- Strehlke, E., ed. (1869). Tabulae Ordinis Theutonici ex tabularii regii Berolinensis codice potissimum. Berlin: Weidmanns@.
- Thompson, T. l., Goncalves, F. J., and Van Cangh, J. M., (1988), Toponymie Palestinienne: Plaine de St. Jean d´Acre et corridor de Jerusalem, Publications de l´institut orientaliste de Louvain, 37, Louvain-la-Neuve. Cited in Petersen, (2001).
