= Village Statistics, 1945 =

Population and land survey of Mandatory Palestine

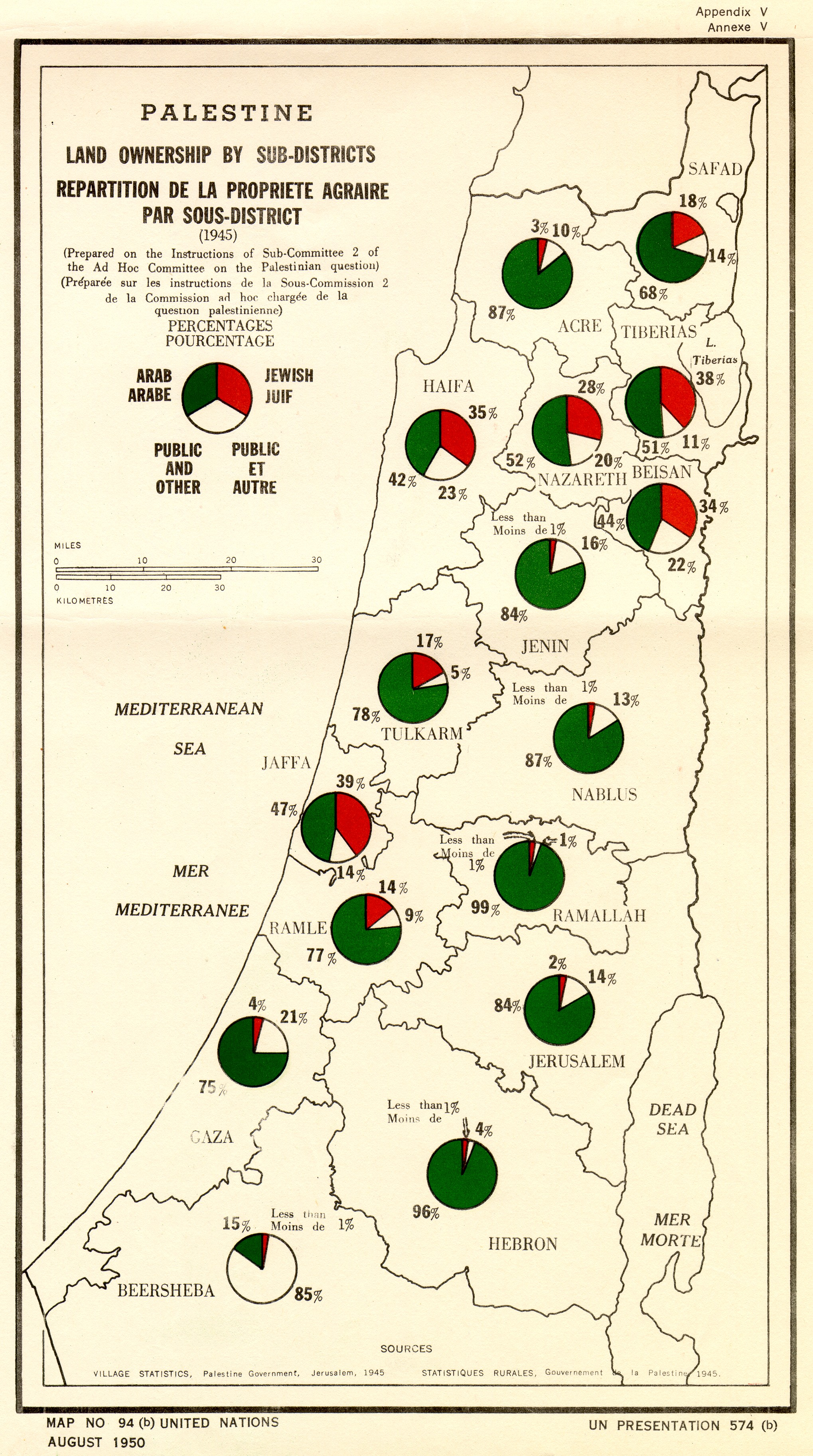
Map of Palestine, land ownership by sub-district (1945), originally published in the Village Statistics, 1945

Village Statistics, 1945 was a joint survey work prepared by the Government Office of Statistics and the Department of Lands of the British Mandate Government for the Anglo-American Committee of Inquiry on Palestine which acted in early 1946. The data were calculated as of April 1, 1945, and was later published and also served the UNSCOP committee that operated in 1947.

The survey encompasses data on land ownership, its uses, population statistics, and tax payment records. The land data was derived from the work conducted for the Peel Commission and subsequently updated by the Mandate Government's Lands Department. The population data was based on the 1931 census of Palestine, updated with information from various partial censuses primarily conducted in the Jewish sector, along with immigration and natural reproduction data. The data for the entire Land of Israel is deemed more reliable than the data for individual districts and settlements. The survey's editors emphasized that it should be viewed as a rough estimate of the actual population rather than an exact count.

== History ==
Previous versions of the report were prepared in 1938 and 1943.

The report found the total population of Palestine to be 1,764,520: there were 1,061,270 Muslims, 553,600 Jews, 135,550 Christians and 14,100 classified as "others" (typically Druze).

Regarding the accuracy of its statistics, the report said:

The last population census taken in Palestine was that of 1931. Since that year, the population has grown considerably both as a consequence of Jewish immigration and of the high rate of natural increase among all sections of the population. The rapidity of the change in the size of the population and the length of the period elapsed since the census rendered difficult the task of estimating the population. The population estimates published here are the result of a very detailed work conducted by the Department of Statistics, by using all the statistical material available on the subject. They cannot, however, be considered as other than rough estimates which in some instances may ultimately be found to differ even considerably, from the actual figures. The estimates for the whole of Palestine are to be considered as more reliable than those for sub-districts, while the sub-district estimates can, in turn, be considered as more reliable than those of the individual localities.

Population statistics were prepared in four stages.

1. The settled population for the whole of Palestine was estimated using the 1931 census data together with natural increase and recorded immigration. Unrecorded immigration of Jews was estimated using data from ships arriving, arrests, and data prepared by the Jewish Agency. Unrecorded immigration or emigration of Arabs could not be estimated "but these movements are not considered to be such as to involve very substantial errors".
2. An initial population estimate for each sub-district was prepared from the 1931 census and natural increase, plus an allotment from the migratory increase. Then several methods were used to adjust the relative population of different sub-districts using calculations of natality, mortality and fertility in each sub-district.
3. The settled population for each locality was provisionally estimated using several previous estimates made up to 1944. Then an overall adjustment was made to bring the total for each sub-district up to the sub-district population estimated at the previous step.
4. The nomadic population estimated at the 1931 census was used since no reliable records for the changes were available.

Regarding the figures for land ownership, the report said: "The areas and ownership have been extracted from the Tax Distribution Lists, prepared under the provisions of the Rural Property Tax Ordinance, 1942, the Valuation Lists prepared under the Urban Property Tax Ordinance, 1940, and the Commuted Tithe records for Beersheba Sub-District, in the Gaza District."

Israeli geographer Moshe Brawer noted that the report was "an important if not the foremost source of information on population, land possession and land utilization" but questioned its accuracy on several grounds. For example, he wrote that aerial photographs showed the population of some localities to be exaggerated, and that land use classifications may have been biased towards categories that attracted lower taxes.

== Gallery ==
Full document (pdf)

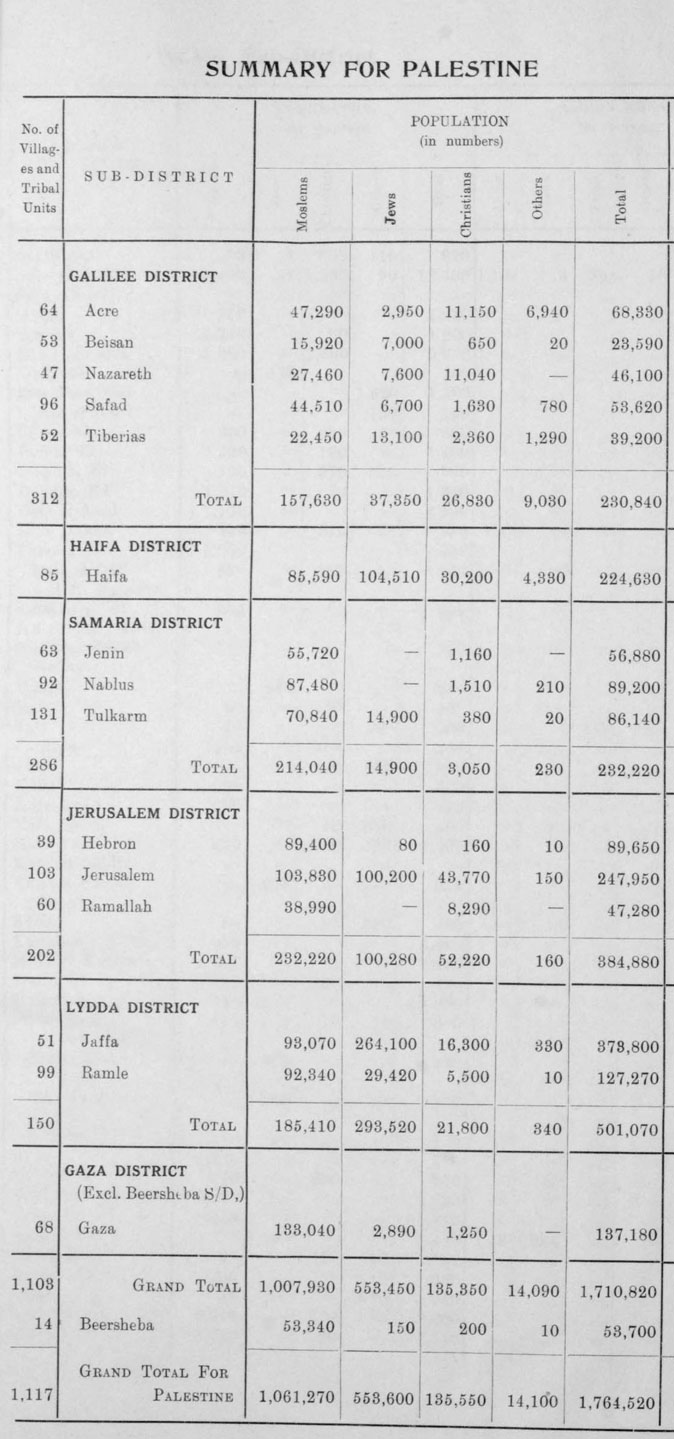
Population summary

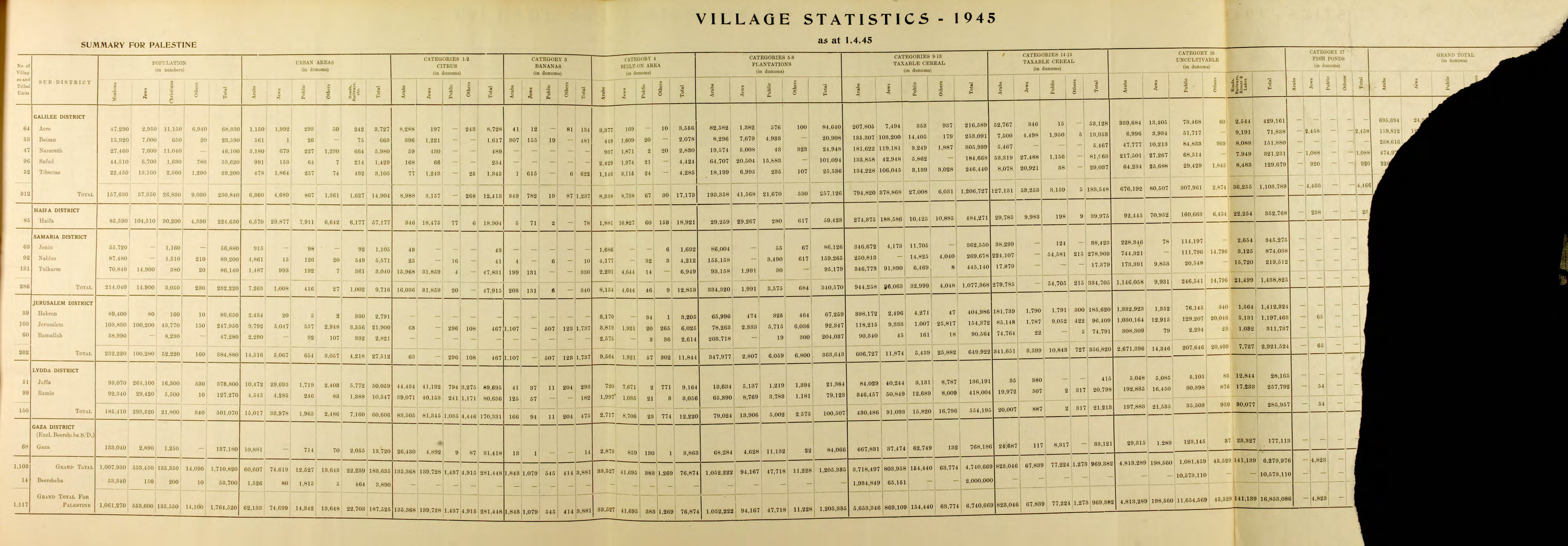
Summary

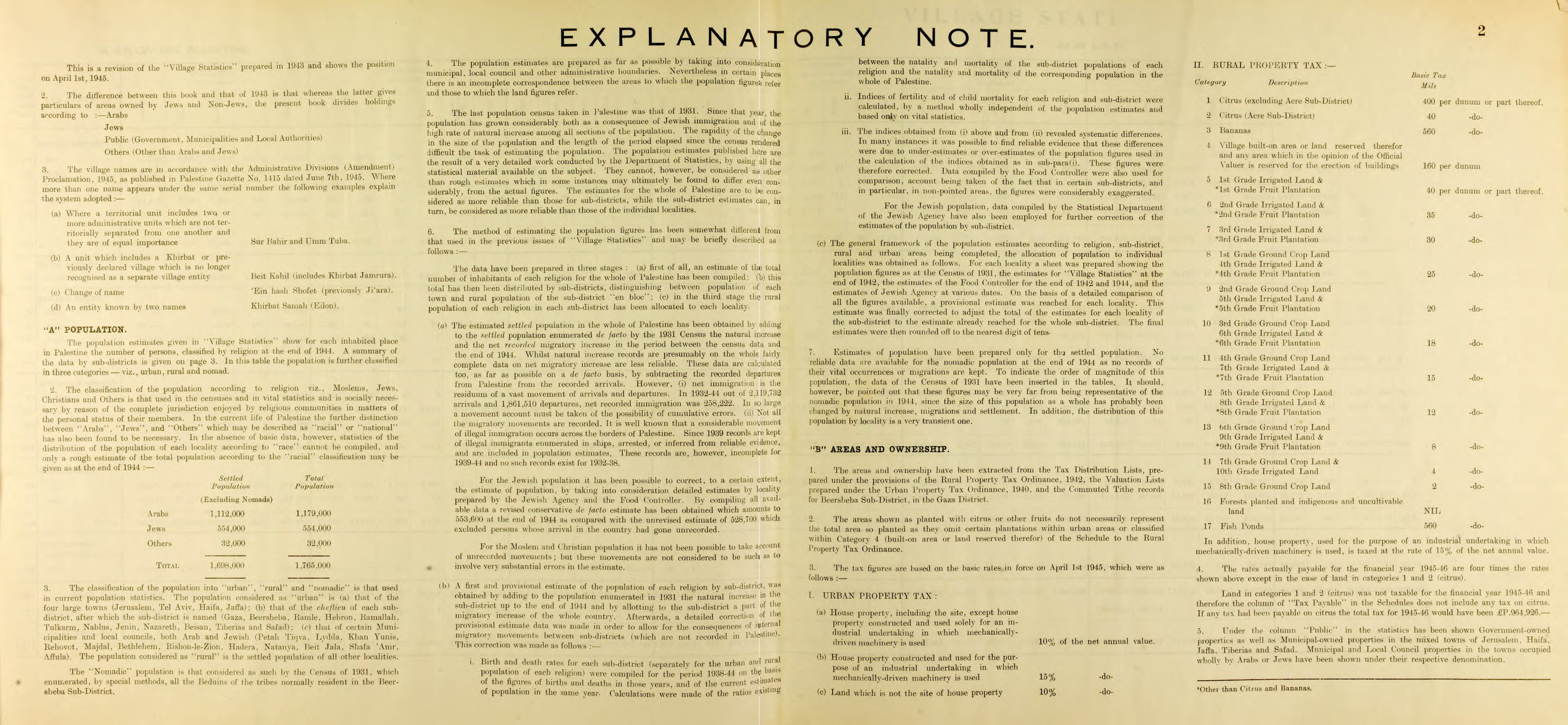
Explanatory note

== Population table by religion ==
Location	Subdistrict	Muslims	Jews	Christians	Others	Total
Abu Sinan	Acre	30		380	410	820
Acre (Urban)	Acre	9,890	50	2,330	90	12,360
Amqa	Acre	1,240				1,240
Arraba	Acre	1,740		60		1,800
Bassa (El)	Acre	1,360		1,590		2,950
Ma'sub	Acre		150			150
Beit Jann	Acre				1,520	1,520
Ein el Asad	Acre				120	120
Bi'na (El)	Acre	530		300		830
Birwa (El)	Acre	1,330		130		1,460
Buqeia (El)	Acre	100		370	520	990
Damin (Ed)	Acre	1,240		70		1,310
Deir el Asad	Acre	1,100				1,100
Deir Hanna	Acre	540		210		750
Fassuta	Acre	1,050				1,050
Deir el Qasi and El Mansura	Acre	370		880		1,250
Ghabisiya (El)	Acre	690				690
Sheikh Dawud (incl. Sheikh Dannun)	Acre	550				550
Hanita	Acre		240			240
Iqrith	Acre	30		460		490
Jatt	Acre	10			190	200
Judeida	Acre	150		130		280
Julis	Acre			40	780	820
Kabul	Acre	560				560
Kafr I'nan	Acre	360				360
Kafr Sumei'	Acre			40	260	300
Kafr Yasif	Acre	350		1,010	40	1,400
Khirbat Jiddin	Acre					
Khirbat Samah (Eilon)	Acre		270			270
Kisra	Acre	90			390	480
Kuweikat	Acre	1,050				1,050
Majd el Kurum	Acre	1,400				1,400
Makr (El)	Acre	390		100		490
Manshiya	Acre	810	270			1,080
Mazra'a (El)	Acre	410		10	10	430
Shavei Zion	Acre		230			230
Ein Sara	Acre		160			160
Gaton	Acre		140			140
Mi'ar	Acre	770				770
Mi'ilya	Acre	110		790		900
Nahf	Acre	1,320				1,320
Nahr (En)	Acre	610				610
Nahariya	Acre		1,440			1,440
Rama (Er)	Acre	90		1,160	440	1,690
Ruweis (Er)	Acre	330				330
Sajur	Acre	10			340	350
Sakhnin	Acre	2,310		290		2,600
Sha'b	Acre	1,710		30		1,740
Suhmata	Acre	1,060		70		1,130
Sumeiriya (Es)	Acre	760				760
Tamra	Acre	1,830				1,830
Tarbiha (includes En Nabi Rubin and Suruh)	Acre	1,000				1,000
Tarshiha	Acre	3,140		690		3,830
Kabri	Acre	1,530				1,530
Umm el Faraj	Acre	800				800
Yanuh	Acre				410	410
Yirka	Acre	70		10	1,420	1,500
Zib (Ez, includes Manawat)	Acre	1,910				1,910
Arab el Aramsha and Arab el Quleitat (includes I'ribbin, Jurdeih and Khirbat Idmith)	Acre	360				360
Arab es Samniya (includes Khirbat es Suwwana and Arab Tauqiya)	Acre	200				200
Arida (El)	Beisan	150				150
Sede Eliyahu	Beisan		180			180
Ashrafiya (El)	Beisan	230				230
Avuqa	Beisan		160			160
Bashatiwa (El)	Beisan	1,560				1,560
Bawati (El Hakimiya)	Beisan	520				520
Beisan (Urban)	Beisan	4,730		430	20	5,180
Sede Nahum (Rural)	Beisan		290			290
Messilot	Beisan		250			250
Beit Alfa	Beisan		430			430
Beit Hash Shitta (Shatta)	Beisan		590			590
Bira (El)	Beisan	260				260
Danna	Beisan	190				190
Ein Harod	Beisan		1,060			1,060
Farwana	Beisan	330				330
Fatur (El)	Beisan	110				110
Gesher	Beisan		130			130
Geva‘	Beisan		380			380
Ghazawiya (El)	Beisan	1,020				1,020
Ma‘oz Hayim	Beisan		450			450
Neve Eitan	Beisan		170			170
Hamidiya (El)	Beisan	220				220
Hermonim	Beisan		100			100
Hamra (El)	Beisan	730				730
Heftsi Bah	Beisan		330			330
Jabbul	Beisan	250				250
Beit Yosef	Beisan		170			170
Jisr el Majami‘	Beisan	10	230	10		250
Kafra	Beisan	430				430
Kafr Misr	Beisan	330				330
Kaukab el Hawa	Beisan	300				300
Kefar Yehezqel	Beisan		430			430
Khuneizir (El)	Beisan	260				260
Masil el Jizl	Beisan	100				100
Kefar Ruppin (Massada)	Beisan		180			180
Murassas (El)	Beisan	450		10		460
Qumiya	Beisan	440				440
Safa (Es)	Beisan	650				650
Sakhina (Es)	Beisan	530				530
Nir David (Tel ‘Amal)	Beisan		290			290
Samiriya (Es)	Beisan	240		10		250
Sirin	Beisan	620		190		810
Taiyiba (Et)	Beisan	280				280
Benei Berit	Beisan		150			150
Tell esh Shauk	Beisan	120				120
Tel Yosef	Beisan		690			690
Tira (Et)	Beisan	150				150
Irgun Borokhov	Beisan		50			50
Tirat Tsevi (Ez Zarra‘a)	Beisan		290			290
Umm ‘Ajra	Beisan	260				260
Wadi el Bira	Beisan	70				70
Yubla	Beisan	210				210
Zab‘a	Beisan	170				170
Auja (El)	Beersheba					
Beersheba	Beersheba	5,360		200	10	5,570
Beit Eshel	Beersheba		40			40
Gevulot	Beersheba		20			20
Jammama	Beersheba					
Ruhama	Beersheba		70			70
Tel Tsofīm	Beersheba		20			20
Tribal Units	Beersheba					
Ahyawāt Tribes	Beersheba					
Azāzima Tribes	Beersheba					
Hanājira Tribes	Beersheba					
Jubārāt Tribes	Beersheba	47,980				47,980
Sa‘idiyin Tribes	Beersheba					
Tarābin Tribes	Beersheba					
Tayāha Tribes	Beersheba					
Abasân	Gaza	2,230				2,230
Abu Midein	Gaza					
Arab Sukreir	Gaza	390				390
Bani Suheila	Gaza	3,220				3,220
Barbara	Gaza	2,410				2,410
Barqā	Gaza	890				890
Batāni Gharbi	Gaza	980				980
Batāni Sharqi	Gaza	650				650
Beit Ṭuwwa	Gaza		690			690
Beit ‘Affa	Gaza	700				700
Beit Darās	Gaza	2,750				2,750
Beit Hānūn	Gaza	1,680	50			1,730
Beit Jirjā	Gaza	940				940
Beit Lāhiya	Gaza	1,700				1,700
Beit Ṭimā	Gaza	1,060				1,060
Bil‘īn and Ard el Ishra	Gaza	180				180
Bureir	Gaza	2,740				2,740
Deir el Balaḥ	Gaza	2,520		40		2,560
Deir Suneid	Gaza	730				730
Dimra	Gaza	520				520
Fālūja, El	Gaza	4,670				4,670
Gan Yavne	Gaza		430			430
Kefar Bistaron	Gaza		180			180
Gaza (Urban)	Gaza	33,160	80	1,010		34,250
Hamāma	Gaza	5,000	60	10		5,070
Hatta	Gaza	970				970
Hirbīya	Gaza	2,200	60	40		2,300
Hūj and Dorot	Gaza	810	230			1,040
Huleiqāt	Gaza	420				420
Ibdīs	Gaza	540				540
Irāq el Manshiya and Gat	Gaza	2,010	210			2,220
Irāq Suweidān	Gaza	660				660
Isdūd	Gaza	4,620	290			4,910
Jabāliya	Gaza	3,520				3,520
Jaldīya	Gaza	360				360
Jiya, El	Gaza	1,230				1,230
Jūlis	Gaza	1,030				1,030
Jūra, El	Gaza	2,420				2,420
Juseir	Gaza	1,180				1,180
Karatiyā	Gaza	1,370				1,370
Kaufakha	Gaza	500				500
Kaukaba	Gaza	680				680
Kefar Warburg	Gaza		260			260
Khān Yūnis (Urban)	Gaza	11,180		40		11,220
Khān Yūnis (Rural)	Gaza					
Khirbat Ikhāza‘a	Gaza	990				990
Khirbat Khisās	Gaza	150				150
Majdal, El (Urban)	Gaza	9,820		90		9,910
Majdal, El (Rural)	Gaza					
Masmiya el Kabīra, El	Gaza	2,510		10		2,520
Masmiya es Saghīra, El	Gaza	530				530
Muḥarraqa, El	Gaza	580				580
Najd	Gaza	620				620
Nazla	Gaza	1,330				1,330
Negba	Gaza		280			280
Ni‘ilyā	Gaza	1,310				1,310
Nuseirāt	Gaza					
Qastina	Gaza	890				890
Rafah	Gaza	2,220				2,220
Sawāfīr el Gharbīya, Es	Gaza	1,030				1,030
Sawāfīr es Shamālīya, Es	Gaza	680				680
Sawāfīr es Sharqīya, Es	Gaza	960		10		970
Sumeirī	Gaza					
Summeil	Gaza	950				950
Sumsum	Gaza	1,290	70			1,360
Tell et Turmus	Gaza	760				760
Yasūr	Gaza	1,070				1,070
Nomads	Gaza	530				530
Abu Shusha	Haifa	720				720
Abu Zureiq	Haifa	550				550
Ar‘ara	Haifa	2,290				2,290
Arab el Fuqara	Haifa	310				310
Arab el Ghawarina (Jisr Zerqa)	Haifa	620				620
Arab en Nufe‘at	Haifa	820				820
Atlit	Haifa	90	510	60		660
Balad esh Sheikh	Haifa	4,120				4,120
Bat Shelomo	Haifa		90			90
Beit Lahm	Haifa	210		160		370
Beit She‘arim	Haifa		330			330
Binyamina	Haifa	270	1,250			1,520
Bureika	Haifa	290				290
Buteimat (El)	Haifa	110				110
Dalyat el Karmil	Haifa			20	2,040	2,060
Daliyat er Ruha	Haifa	280				280
Dalia	Haifa		320			320
Dumeira (Ed)	Haifa	620				620
Ein Ghazal	Haifa	2,170				2,170
Ein Haud	Haifa	650				650
Ein hash Shofet (previously Ji‘ara)	Haifa		320			320
El Ro‘i (previously part of Esh Sheikh Bureik)	Haifa		360			360
Emeq Zevulun (Jidra Ghawarina)	Haifa	790				790
Kefar Masaryk	Haifa		270			270
Ein ham Mifratz	Haifa		260			260
Fureidis (El)	Haifa	780				780
Ghubaiyat (includes El Ghubaiya el Fauqa, El Ghubaiya et Tahta and En Naghnagiya)	Haifa	1,130				1,130
Giv‘at ‘Ada (El Marah)	Haifa		160			160
Giv‘ot Zeid (previously part of Esh Sheikh Bureik)	Haifa		110			110
Hadera (Urban)	Haifa		7,810	20		7,830
Hadera (Rural)	Haifa					
Haifa (includes Ahuzzat Sir Herbert Samuel)	Haifa	35,940	75,500	26,570	290	138,300
Haz Zorea‘ (previously part of Qira wa Qamun)	Haifa		290			290
Heftsi Bah	Haifa		20			20
I‘billin	Haifa	600		1,060		1,660
Ijzim	Haifa	2,830		140		2,970
Isfiya	Haifa	180		300	1,310	1,790
Jaba‘	Haifa	1,140				1,140
Kabara	Haifa	120				120
Kafrin (El)	Haifa	920				920
Kafr Lam	Haifa	340				340
Kafr Qari‘	Haifa	1,510				1,510
Karkur	Haifa		2,380			2,380
Kefar ‘Atta (Kufritta)	Haifa		1,690			1,690
Kefar Brandeis	Haifa		150			150
Kefar ham Macabi	Haifa		210			210
Kefar Hasidim	Haifa		980			980
Kefar Yehoshua‘	Haifa		620			620
Khirbat el Burj	Haifa					
Khirbat ed Damum	Haifa	340				340
Khirbat Lid (El ‘Awadim)	Haifa	640				640
Khubeiza	Haifa	290				290
Khureiba (El)	Haifa					
Mansi (El, ‘Arab Baniha)	Haifa	1,180		20		1,200
Mazra‘a (El)	Haifa	210				210
Meir Shefeiya	Haifa		330			330
Mesheq Yagur	Haifa		1,220			1,220
Mishmar ha ‘Emeq	Haifa		390			390
Nesher	Haifa	1,430	1,400			2,830
Pardes Hanna	Haifa	670	2,300			2,970
Qannir	Haifa	750				750
Qiryat ‘Amal	Haifa		530			530
Qiryat Haroshet	Haifa		240			240
Qisariya (Caesarea)	Haifa	930	160	30		1,120
Ramat hash Shofet	Haifa		240			240
Ramat Yissai	Haifa		50			50
Ramat Yohanan	Haifa		420			420
Rihaniya (Er)	Haifa	240				240
Sabbirin	Haifa	1,670		30		1,700
Sarafand (Es)	Haifa	290				290
Sede Ya‘aqov	Haifa		350			350
Sh‘ar ha ‘Amaqim (previously part of Esh Sheikh Bureik)	Haifa		360			360
Shafa ‘Amr (Urban)	Haifa	1,380	10	1,560	690	3,640
Shafa ‘Amr (Rural)	Haifa	3,560				3,560
Sindiyana (Es)	Haifa	1,250				1,250
Tantura	Haifa	1,470		20		1,490
Tira (Et)	Haifa	5,240		30		5,270
Tiv‘on (Alonim)	Haifa	370	320			690
Umm esh Shauf	Haifa	480				480
Umm ez Zinat	Haifa	1,450		20		1,470
Usha	Haifa		180			180
Wadi ‘Ara	Haifa	230				230
Waldheim (Umm el ‘Amad)	Haifa	150		110		260
Ya‘arot hak Karmel (previously Khirbat Shalala)	Haifa		360			360
Yajur	Haifa	560		50		610
Yoqne‘am (previously part of Qira wa Qamun)	Haifa	410	280			690
Zikhron Ya‘aqov	Haifa		1,740			1,740
Ajjur (Includes Khirbat ‘Ammuriya)	Hebron	3,720		10		3,730
Bani Na‘im	Hebron	2,160				2,160
Barqusya	Hebron	330				330
Beit Aula	Hebron	1,310				1,310
Beit Jibrin	Hebron	2,430				2,430
Beit Kahil	Hebron	570				570
Beit Nattif	Hebron	2,150				2,150
Beit ‘Ummar	Hebron	1,600	80			1,680
Dawayima, Ed	Hebron	3,710				3,710
Deir ed Dubban	Hebron	730				730
Deir Nakh-Khas	Hebron	600				600
Dhahiriya, Edh	Hebron	3,760				3,760
Dura	Hebron	9,700				9,700
Halhul	Hebron	3,380				3,380
Hebron (Urban)	Hebron	24,400		150	10	24,560
Hebron (Rural)	Hebron					
Idna	Hebron	2,190				2,190
Ja‘fa, El	Hebron	210				210
Kharas	Hebron	970				970
Khirbat Jamrura	Hebron					
Khirbat Umm Burj	Hebron	140				140
Kidna	Hebron	450				450
Mughallis	Hebron	540				540
Nuba	Hebron	760				760
Qubeiba, El	Hebron	1,060				1,060
Ra‘na	Hebron	190				190
Rihiya, Er	Hebron	330				330
Samu‘, Es	Hebron	2,520				2,520
Shuyukh, Esh	Hebron	1,240				1,240
Si‘ir	Hebron	2,710				2,710
Surif	Hebron	2,190				2,190
Tafuh	Hebron	780				780
Tarqumiya	Hebron	1,550				1,550
Tell es Safi	Hebron	1,290				1,290
Yatta	Hebron	5,260				5,260
Zakariya	Hebron	1,180				1,180
Zeita	Hebron	330				330
Zikrin	Hebron	960				960
Arab el Jahalin (Dawahik, Ed; Dhalamat, Edh; Sarayi‘a, Es)	Hebron	2,000				2,000
Abu Kishk	Jaffa	1,900				1,900
Bat Yam (Urban)	Jaffa		2,000			2,000
Beit Dajan	Jaffa	3,710		130		3,840
Benei Beraq (Urban)	Jaffa		5,760			5,760
Benei Beraq (Rural)	Jaffa					
Biyar ‘Adas	Jaffa	300				300
Fajja	Jaffa	1,200	370			1,570
Gat Rimmon	Jaffa		490			490
Giv‘atayim	Jaffa		5,800			5,800
Giv‘at Hen (Irgun Ra‘anana)	Jaffa		200			200
Hadar	Jaffa		540			540
Haram (El)	Jaffa	520	360			880
Herzliya (Urban)	Jaffa		4,650			4,650
Herzliya (Rural)	Jaffa					
Holon (Urban)	Jaffa		3,280			3,280
Holon (Rural)	Jaffa					
Jaffa (Urban)	Jaffa	50,880	28,000	15,400	30	94,310
Jaffa (Rural)	Jaffa					
Jalil el Qibliya	Jaffa	470	210			680
Jalil esh Shamaliya	Jaffa	190				190
Jammasin el Gharbi	Jaffa	1,080				1,080
Jammasin esh Sharqi	Jaffa	730				730
Jarisha	Jaffa	190				190
Kafr ‘Ana	Jaffa	2,800	220			3,020
Kefar Gannim	Jaffa		1,720			1,720
Kefar Malal	Jaffa		960			960
Kefar Sava (Urban)	Jaffa		4,320			4,320
Kefar Sava (Rural)	Jaffa					
Kheiriya (El)	Jaffa	1,400		20		1,420
Magdiel	Jaffa		1,260			1,260
Mas‘udiya (El) (Summeil)	Jaffa	830		20		850
Miqwe Yisrael	Jaffa		750			750
Mirr (El) (Mahmudiya)	Jaffa	170				170
Muweilhi (El)	Jaffa	360				360
Nahalat Yitshaq (Urban)	Jaffa		870			870
Petah Tiqva (Urban)	Jaffa	140	17,100	10		17,250
Petah Tiqva (Rural)	Jaffa		1,720			1,720
Qiryat Shaul	Jaffa		90			90
Ra‘anana (Urban)	Jaffa		3,290			3,290
Ra‘anana (Rural)	Jaffa					
Ramatayim	Jaffa		1,480			1,480
Ramat haSharon	Jaffa		770			770
Ramat Gan (Urban)	Jaffa		10,200			10,200
Ramat Gan (Rural)	Jaffa					
Rantiya	Jaffa	590				590
Rishpon	Jaffa		280			280
Safiriya (Es)	Jaffa	3,070				3,070
Salama	Jaffa	6,670		60		6,730
Saqiya	Jaffa	1,100				1,100
Sarona (Urban)	Jaffa			150		150
Sarona (Rural)	Jaffa					
Sawalim (Es)	Jaffa	800				800
Shefayim	Jaffa		430			430
Sheikh Muwannis (Esh)	Jaffa	1,930				1,930
Tel Aviv (Urban)	Jaffa	130	166,000	230	300	166,660
Tel Litwinsky	Jaffa		610			610
Wilhelma	Jaffa			240		240
Yahudiya (El) (‘Abbasiyya)	Jaffa	5,630	150	20		5,800
Yarqona	Jaffa		220			220
Yazur	Jaffa	4,010		20		4,030
Nomadic	Jaffa	2,270				2,270
Ajja	Jenin	890				890
Anin	Jenin	590				590
Anza	Jenin	880				880
Araqa	Jenin	350				350
Arraba	Jenin	3,810				3,810
Arrana	Jenin	320				320
Arabbuna	Jenin	210				210
Barid (El)	Jenin	280				280
Barta‘a (includes Khirbat Tura el Gharbiya)	Jenin	1,000				1,000
Beit Qad	Jenin	290				290
Birqin	Jenin	1,430		110		1,540
Deir Abu Da‘if	Jenin	850				850
Deir Ghazala	Jenin	240		30		270
Ein el Mansi	Jenin	90				90
Fahma	Jenin	350				350
Fandaqumiya (El)	Jenin	630				630
Faqu‘a	Jenin	880				880
Frasin	Jenin	20				20
Jaba‘	Jenin	2,090		10		2,100
Jalama	Jenin	460				460
Jalbun (includes Khirbat el Mujadd‘a)	Jenin	610				610
Jalamus	Jenin	220				220
Jarba‘	Jenin	100				100
Jenin (Urban)	Jenin	3,840		150		3,990
Jenin (Rural)	Jenin					
Judeida	Jenin	830				830
Kafr Dan	Jenin	850				850
Kafr Qud	Jenin	240		10		250
Kafr Ra‘i	Jenin	2,150				2,150
Kufeir	Jenin	130		10		140
Kufreith	Jenin	240				240
Mazra‘a (El)	Jenin	270				270
Meithalun	Jenin	1,360				1,360
Mirka	Jenin	230				230
Misilya	Jenin	330				330
Mughaiyir (El) (includes Khirbat el Mutila)	Jenin	220				220
Muqeible	Jenin	460				460
Nuris	Jenin	570				570
Qabatiya (includes Khirbat Tannin)	Jenin	3,670				3,670
Raba‘a (includes Khirbat Umm Sirhan)	Jenin	870				870
Rama (Er)	Jenin	280				280
Rummana (includes Khirbat Salim)	Jenin	880				880
Sandala	Jenin	270				270
Sanur (includes Nukheil)	Jenin	1,020				1,020
Silat edh Dhahr	Jenin	2,850				2,850
Silat el Harithiya	Jenin	1,860				1,860
Sir	Jenin	290				290
Siris	Jenin	830				830
Ti‘innik	Jenin	100				100
Tilfit	Jenin	170				170
Umm el Fahm (includes ‘Aqqada, ‘Ein Ibrahim, Khirbat el Buweishat, El Murtafi‘a, Lajjun, Mu‘awiya, Musheirifa and Musmus)	Jenin	5,430		60		5,490
Umm et Tut	Jenin	170				170
Ya‘bad (includes Khirbat el Khuljan, Khirbat et Tarim, Khirbat Tura esh Sharqiya, Nazlat Sheikh Zeid and Khirbat Umm Rihan)	Jenin	3,480				3,480
Yamun (El)	Jenin	2,520				2,520
Zabubida (Ez)	Jenin	90		780		870
Zalafa	Jenin	340				340
Zawiya	Jenin	120				120
Zibda	Jenin	190				190
Zir‘in	Jenin	1,420				1,420
Zububa	Jenin	560				560
Abu Dis	Jerusalem	1,940				1,940
Allar	Jerusalem	440				440
Anata	Jerusalem	540				540
Aqqua	Jerusalem	40				40
Artas	Jerusalem	690		110		800
Artuf	Jerusalem	350				350
Atarot	Jerusalem		160			160
Auja (El)	Jerusalem	290				290
Arab el Nuseirat	Jerusalem	520				520
Arab el Ka‘bina	Jerusalem	260				260
Arab el ‘Ureinat	Jerusalem	210				210
Arab es Sa‘ayida	Jerusalem	110				110
Battir	Jerusalem	1,050				1,050
Beit Duqqu	Jerusalem	420				420
Beit Fajjar	Jerusalem	1,480				1,480
Beit Hanina	Jerusalem	1,590				1,590
Beit Ijza	Jerusalem	70				70
Beit Iksa	Jerusalem	1,410				1,410
Beit I‘nan	Jerusalem	820				820
Beit ‘Itab	Jerusalem	540				540
Beit Jala (Urban)	Jerusalem	200		3,510		3,710
Beit Jala (Rural)	Jerusalem					
Beit Jimal	Jerusalem	120		120		240
Beit Mahsir	Jerusalem	2,400				2,400
Beit Naqquba	Jerusalem	240				240
Beit Safafa	Jerusalem	1,370		40		1,410
Beit Sahur (Urban)	Jerusalem	370		2,400		2,770
Beit Sahur (Rural)	Jerusalem					
Beit Surik	Jerusalem	480				480
Beit Thul	Jerusalem	260				260
Beit Umm el Meis	Jerusalem	70				70
Bethlehem (Urban)	Jerusalem	2,370		6,430	20	8,820
Bethlehem (Rural)	Jerusalem					
Biddu	Jerusalem	520				520
Bir Nabala	Jerusalem	590				590
Bureij	Jerusalem	710		10		720
Deiraban	Jerusalem	2,090		10		2,100
Deir ‘Amr	Jerusalem	10				10
Deir el Hawa	Jerusalem	60				60
Deir Rifat	Jerusalem	330		100		430
Deir esh Sheikh	Jerusalem	210		10		220
Deir Yasin	Jerusalem	610				610
Duyuk	Jerusalem	730				730
Ein Karim	Jerusalem	2,510		670		3,180
Eizariya (El)	Jerusalem	1,040		20		1,060
Har Tuv	Jerusalem		80			80
Hizma	Jerusalem	750				750
Husan	Jerusalem	770				770
Isawiya	Jerusalem	720		10		730
Ishwa‘	Jerusalem	620				620
Islin	Jerusalem	260				260
Jaba‘	Jerusalem	350				350
Jarash	Jerusalem	190				190
Jericho	Jerusalem	2,570	170	260	10	3,010
Jerusalem (Urban)	Jerusalem	30,630	97,000	29,350	100	157,080
Jerusalem (Rural)	Jerusalem					
Jib (El)	Jerusalem	830				830
Judeira	Jerusalem	190				190
Jura (El)	Jerusalem	420				420
Kafr ‘Aqab	Jerusalem	290				290
Kasla	Jerusalem	280				280
Khadr (El)	Jerusalem	1,130				1,130
Khan el Ahmar	Jerusalem					
Khirbat Ismallah	Jerusalem	20				20
Khirbat el Lauz	Jerusalem	450				450
Khirbat el ‘Umur	Jerusalem	270				270
Lifta	Jerusalem	2,530		20		2,550
Malha (El)	Jerusalem	1,930		10		1,940
Mukhmas	Jerusalem	540				540
Nabi Musa (En)	Jerusalem					
Palestine Potash Concession (North)	Jerusalem	1,330	1,270	30	20	2,650
Nabi Samwil (En)	Jerusalem	200				200
Nabhalin	Jerusalem	620				620
Nataf	Jerusalem	40				40
Neve Ya‘aqov	Jerusalem		190			190
Nu‘eima	Jerusalem	240				240
Qabu (El)	Jerusalem	260				260
Qalandiya	Jerusalem	190				190
Qaluniya	Jerusalem	900		10		910
Motza	Jerusalem		350			350
Qaryat el ‘Inab (Abu Ghosh)	Jerusalem	820		40		860
Qastal (El)	Jerusalem	90				90
Qatanna	Jerusalem	1,150				1,150
Qiryat ‘Anavim	Jerusalem		380			380
Ma‘ale	Jerusalem		230			230
Qubeiba (El)	Jerusalem	340		80		420
Rafat	Jerusalem	280				280
Ram (Er)	Jerusalem	350				350
Ramat Rahel	Jerusalem		370			370
Ras Abu ‘Ammar	Jerusalem	620				620
Sar‘a	Jerusalem	340				340
Saris	Jerusalem	560				560
Sataf	Jerusalem	540				540
Sharafat	Jerusalem	210				210
Shufat	Jerusalem	760				760
Silwan	Jerusalem	3,680		140		3,820
Saba	Jerusalem	620				620
Sufla	Jerusalem	60				60
Sur Bahir and Umm Tuba	Jerusalem	2,450				2,450
Tur (Et)	Jerusalem	2,380		390		2,770
Wadi Fukin	Jerusalem	280				280
Walaja (El)	Jerusalem	1,650				1,650
Tribal Units – ‘Arab Ibn ‘Ubeid, ‘Arab er Rashaida, ‘Arab es Sawahira, ‘Arab et Ta‘amira	Jerusalem	7,070				7,070
Ammuriya	Nablus	120				120
Aqqaba	Nablus	580		20		600
Aqraba (includes Khirbat Fasayil)	Nablus	2,060				2,060
Asira el Qibliya	Nablus	410				410
Asira esh Shamaliya	Nablus	2,060				2,060
Askar	Nablus	340				340
Awarta and Udala	Nablus	1,470				1,470
Azmut	Nablus	410				410
Balata	Nablus	770				770
Baqa	Nablus	390				390
Bazzariya	Nablus	320				320
Beita	Nablus	1,580				1,580
Beit Dajan (includes Beit Dajan Jiftlik and Khirbat Furush)	Nablus	750				750
Beit Furik (includes Khirbat Kafr Beita)	Nablus	1,240				1,240
Beit Iba	Nablus	630				630
Beit Umrin	Nablus	860				860
Beit Wazan	Nablus	310				310
Bidya	Nablus	1,360				1,360
Burin and ‘Iraq Burin	Nablus	1,200				1,200
Buraq	Nablus	2,410		180		2,590
Buruqin (Ibruqin)	Nablus	690				690
Deir Ballut	Nablus	720				720
Deir el Hatab	Nablus	370				370
Deir Istiya	Nablus	1,190				1,190
Deir Sharaf	Nablus	800				800
Duma	Nablus	310				310
Einabus	Nablus	340				340
Far‘ata	Nablus	70				70
Farkha	Nablus	380				380
Funduq (El)	Nablus	100				100
Ghor el Fari‘a (Qarawa el Fauqa, Qarawa et Tahta and Umm Hureira)	Nablus	1,670				1,670
Hajjah	Nablus	960				960
Haris	Nablus	540				540
Huwwara	Nablus	1,300				1,300
Jinsiniya	Nablus	200				200
Immatin	Nablus	440				440
Iskaka	Nablus	260				260
Jalud	Nablus	300				300
Jamma‘in	Nablus	1,240				1,240
Jinsafut	Nablus	450				450
Jit	Nablus	440				440
Juneid	Nablus	90				90
Jurish (includes Kafr Atiya)	Nablus	340				340
Kafr ed Dik	Nablus	870				870
Kafr Laqif	Nablus	210				210
Kafr Qaddum	Nablus	1,240				1,240
Kafr Qallil (includes Khirbat Sarin)	Nablus	470				470
Khirbat Qeis	Nablus	170				170
Khirbat Sir	Nablus					
Kifl Harith	Nablus	770				770
Lubban Sharqiya	Nablus	620				620
Madama	Nablus	290				290
Majdal Bani Fadil	Nablus	430				430
Marda	Nablus	470				470
Mas-ha	Nablus	110				110
Mughayyir (El) (includes Khirbat Jib‘it)	Nablus	290				290
Nablus (Urban)	Nablus	22,360		680	210	23,250
Nablus (Rural)	Nablus					
Naqura (En)	Nablus	350				350
Nisf Jubeil	Nablus	80		180		260
Qabalan	Nablus	1,310				1,310
Qarawat Bani Hasan	Nablus	450				450
Qaryut	Nablus	930				930
Qira	Nablus	140				140
Qusin	Nablus	310				310
Qusra	Nablus	1,120				1,120
Rafat	Nablus	180				180
Rafidiya	Nablus	80		350		430
Rujeib	Nablus	390				390
Sabastiya	Nablus	980		40		1,020
Salfit	Nablus	1,830				1,830
Salim	Nablus	660				660
Samiriya	Nablus	990				990
Sarra	Nablus	540				540
Sarta	Nablus	420				420
Sawiya (Es)	Nablus	820				820
Talfit	Nablus	610				610
Talluza	Nablus	1,830				1,830
Tammun	Nablus	2,070				2,070
Tayasir	Nablus	260				260
Tell	Nablus	1,060				1,060
Tubas (includes Kashda and Bardala)	Nablus	5,470		60		5,530
Urif	Nablus	520				520
Usarin	Nablus	200				200
Yanun	Nablus	50				50
Yasid	Nablus	480				480
Yusuf	Nablus	360				360
Yatma	Nablus	440				440
Zawata	Nablus	330				330
Zawiya	Nablus	720				720
Zeita	Nablus	510				510
Nomadic	Nablus	220				220
Afula (Urban)	Nazareth	10	2,300			2,310
Afula (Rural)	Nazareth					
Arah es Subeih	Nazareth	1,320				1,320
Balfourya	Nazareth		330			330
Bu'eina	Nazareth	540				540
Daburiyya	Nazareth	1,260		30		1,290
Dahi (Ed)	Nazareth	110				110
Ein Mahil	Nazareth	1,040				1,040
Gevat	Nazareth		520			520
Ginneigar	Nazareth		330			330
Iksal	Nazareth	1,110				1,110
Ijzim	Nazareth	1,310				1,310
Indur	Nazareth	620				620
Kafr Kanna	Nazareth	1,320		610		1,930
Kafr Manda	Nazareth	1,260				1,260
Kaukab	Nazareth	490				490
Kefar Barukh	Nazareth		250			250
Kefar Gid‘on	Nazareth		90			90
Kefar ha Horesh	Nazareth		220			220
Kefar Tavor (Mash-ha)	Nazareth		230			230
Kefar Yeladim	Nazareth					
Mahane Yisrael	Nazareth					
Ma‘lul	Nazareth	490		200		690
Mash-had	Nazareth	660				660
Merhavia Settlement	Nazareth		270			270
Merhavia Group	Nazareth		350			350
Mizra‘	Nazareth		320			320
Mount Tabor (includes Umm el Ghanam)	Nazareth					
Mujeidil (El)	Nazareth	1,640		260		1,900
Nahalal and Shimron	Nazareth		1,090			1,090
Na‘ura	Nazareth	340				340
Nazareth (Urban)	Nazareth	5,600		8,600		14,200
Nazareth (Rural)	Nazareth					
Nein	Nazareth	270				270
Ramat David	Nazareth		250			250
Ayanot	Nazareth					
Hash Sharon	Nazareth		260			260
Reina (Er)	Nazareth	790		500		1,290
Rummana	Nazareth	590				590
Saffuriya	Nazareth	4,320		10		4,330
Sarid	Nazareth		350			350
Sulam	Nazareth	470				470
Tamra	Nazareth	160	80			240
Tel ‘Adashim	Nazareth		360			360
Tur‘an	Nazareth	1,010		340		1,350
Umm Qubei	Nazareth					
Uzeir	Nazareth	150				150
Yafa	Nazareth	580		490		1,070
Abu el Fadl (Es Sautariya)	Ramle	510				510
Abu Shusha	Ramle	870				870
Aqir	Ramle	2,480				2,480
Barfiliya	Ramle	730				730
Barriya (El)	Ramle	510				510
Bashshit	Ramle	1,620				1,620
Beer Ya‘aqov	Ramle		450			450
Beit Hanan	Ramle		460			460
Neta‘im	Ramle		230			230
Beit Jiz	Ramle	550				550
Beit Nabala	Ramle	2,310				2,310
Beit Nuba and ‘Ajanul	Ramle	1,240				1,240
Beit ‘Oved	Ramle		550			550
Beit Shanna	Ramle	210				210
Beit Susin	Ramle	210				210
Ben Shemen	Ramle		930			930
Bil‘in	Ramle	210				210
Bir Ma‘in	Ramle	510				510
Bir Salim	Ramle	410				410
Budrus	Ramle	510				510
Burj (El)	Ramle	480				480
Daniyal	Ramle	410				410
Deir Abu Salama	Ramle	60				60
Deir Aiyub	Ramle	320				320
Deir Muhsein	Ramle	460				460
Deir Qaddis	Ramle	440				440
Deir Tarif	Ramle	1,750				1,750
Gan Shelomo	Ramle		240			240
Gedera	Ramle		970			970
Giv‘at Brenner	Ramle		1,010			1,010
Haditha (El)	Ramle	760				760
Hulda	Ramle		260			260
Idhnibba	Ramle	490				490
Imwas	Ramle	1,450				1,450
Inaba	Ramle	1,420				1,420
Jilya	Ramle	330				330
Jimzu	Ramle	1,510				1,510
Jindas	Ramle					
Kefar Aharon	Ramle		80			80
Kefar Bilu	Ramle		230			230
Kefar Marmorek	Ramle		750			750
Kefar Menahem	Ramle		290			290
Kefar Sirkin	Ramle		540			540
Kefar Uriya	Ramle		20			20
Khalayil (El)	Ramle	650				650
Kharbatha	Ramle	170				170
Kheima (El)	Ramle	190				190
Khirbat Beit Far	Ramle	300				300
Khirbat el Buweira	Ramle	190				190
Khirbat edh Dhuhriya	Ramle	100				100
Khuld	Ramle	280				280
Kunaiyisa (El)	Ramle	40				40
Latrun	Ramle			190		190
Lubban (El)	Ramle	340				340
Lydda (Urban)	Ramle	14,910	20	1,840	10	16,780
Lydda (Rural)	Ramle					
Majdal Yaba (Majdal es Sadiq)	Ramle	1,520				1,520
Mansura (El)	Ramle	90				90
Mazkeret Batyah (Eqron)	Ramle		450			450
Midya (El)	Ramle	320				320
Mughar (El)	Ramle	1,740				1,740
Mukheizin (El)	Ramle	200	110			310
Muzeiri‘a (El)	Ramle	1,160				1,160
Na‘ana (Ni‘ana)	Ramle	1,450	590	20		2,060
Nabi Rubin (En)	Ramle	1,420				1,420
Nahalath Yehuda	Ramle		850			850
Ni‘lin	Ramle	1,420				1,420
Qatra	Ramle	1,210				1,210
Qazaza	Ramle	940				940
Qibya	Ramle	1,250				1,250
Qubab (El)	Ramle	1,980				1,980
Qubeiba (El)	Ramle	1,720				1,720
Qula	Ramle	1,010				1,010
Ramle (Urban)	Ramle	11,900		3,260		15,160
Ramle (Rural)	Ramle					
Rantis	Ramle	1,280				1,280
Rehovot (Urban)	Ramle		10,000	20		10,020
Rehovot (Rural)	Ramle					
Rishon le Zion (Urban)	Ramle		8,100			8,100
Rishon le Zion (Rural)	Ramle					
Sajad	Ramle	370				370
Sallit	Ramle	510				510
Sarafand el ‘Amar	Ramle	1,910		40		1,950
Sarafand el Kharab	Ramle	930		110		1,040
Seidun	Ramle	210				210
Shabtin	Ramle	150				150
Shahma	Ramle	280				280
Shilta	Ramle	100				100
Shuqba	Ramle	840				840
Tina (Et)	Ramle	750				750
Tira (Et)	Ramle	1,290				1,290
Tira Shalom	Ramle		290			290
Umm Kalha	Ramle	60				60
Wadi Hunein	Ramle	1,620				1,620
Wadi Hunein (Nes Tsiyona)	Ramle		1,760			1,760
Yalu	Ramle	1,220				1,220
Yibna	Ramle	5,400		20		5,420
Zarnuqa	Ramle	2,380				2,380
Gibbeton	Ramle		240			240
Nomadic	Ramle	3,780				3,780
Abud	Ramallah	550		530		1,080
Abu Qashsh	Ramallah	300				300
Abu Shukheidim	Ramallah	250				250
Abwein (Ibwein)	Ramallah	880				880
Ajjul	Ramallah	350				350
Arura	Ramallah	660				660
Atara	Ramallah	690				690
Beitillu	Ramallah	490				490
Beitin	Ramallah	690				690
Beit Liqya	Ramallah	1,040				1,040
Beit Rima	Ramallah	930				930
Beit Sira	Ramallah	540				540
Beit ‘Ur el Fauqa	Ramallah	210				210
Beit ‘Ur et Tahta	Ramallah	710				710
Beituniya	Ramallah	1,490				1,490
Bir Zeit	Ramallah	570		990		1,560
Bira (El) (Urban)	Ramallah	2,640		280		2,920
Burham	Ramallah	150				150
Burqa	Ramallah	380				380
Deir Abu Mash‘al	Ramallah	510				510
Deir ‘Ammar	Ramallah	350				350
Deir Dibwan	Ramallah	2,080				2,080
Deir Ghassana	Ramallah	880				880
Deir Ibzi‘	Ramallah	410				410
Deir Jarir	Ramallah	1,080				1,080
Deir Nidham	Ramallah	190				190
Deir es Sudan	Ramallah	280				280
Dur‘a el Qari‘	Ramallah	370				370
Ein ‘Arik	Ramallah	360		250		610
Ein Qiniya	Ramallah	100				100
Ein Siniya	Ramallah	310		20		330
Ein Yabrud	Ramallah	930				930
Jammala	Ramallah	200				200
Janiya (El)	Ramallah	300				300
Jibiya	Ramallah	90				90
Jifna	Ramallah	330		580		910
Jiljiliya	Ramallah	280				280
Kafr ‘Ein	Ramallah	550				550
Kafr Malik	Ramallah	1,080		20		1,100
Kafr Ni‘ma	Ramallah	780				780
Kaubar	Ramallah	610				610
Khirbat Abu Falah	Ramallah	710				710
Khirbat el Misbah	Ramallah	600				600
Mazari‘ el ‘Urbani	Ramallah	1,090				1,090
Mazra‘a el Qibliya (El)	Ramallah	860				860
Mazra‘a esh Sharqiya (El)	Ramallah	1,400				1,400
Nabi Salih (En)	Ramallah	170				170
Qarawat Bani Zeid	Ramallah	500				500
Ramallah (Urban)	Ramallah	640		4,440		5,080
Rammun	Ramallah	970				970
Ras Karkar	Ramallah	340				340
Saffa	Ramallah	790				790
Silwad	Ramallah	1,910				1,910
Sinjil	Ramallah	1,320				1,320
Surda	Ramallah	250				250
Taiyiba (Et)	Ramallah	150		1,180		1,330
Tira (Et)	Ramallah	330				330
Turmus ‘Ayya	Ramallah	960				960
Umm Safa (Kafr Ishwa‘)	Ramallah	110				110
Yabrud	Ramallah	300				300
Abil el Qamh	Safad	230		100		330
Abisiyya (El)	Safad	830				830
Kefar Szold	Safad		290			290
Azaziyat, ‘Ein Fit and Khirbat es Summan	Safad	390				390
Aiyelet hash Shahar	Safad		540			540
Yarda	Safad	20				20
Akbara	Safad	390				390
Alma	Safad	950				950
Ammiqa	Safad	140				140
Arab esh Shamlina (Khirbat Abu Zeina, includes El Buteiha)	Safad	650				650
Beisamun	Safad	20				20
Biriya	Safad	240				240
Buweiziya (El, includes Meis)	Safad	510				510
Dafna	Safad		380			380
Dallata	Safad	360				360
Dan (previously Khan ed Duweir)	Safad		260			260
Darbashiya (Ed)	Safad	310				310
Dawwara	Safad	700				700
Amir	Safad		240			240
Kefar Nehemya	Safad		160			160
Deishum	Safad	590				590
Dhahiriya el Fauqa (Edh Dhahiriya et Tahta)	Safad	350				350
Ein ez Zeitun	Safad	820				820
Ein Zeitim	Safad					
Fara	Safad	320				320
Farradiya	Safad	670				670
Fir‘im	Safad	740				740
Ghabbatiya	Safad	60				60
Ghuraba	Safad	220				220
Harrawi	Safad					
Hatsor	Safad					
Hula Concession Area	Safad		190			190
Hunin (includes Hula and ‘Udeisa)	Safad	1,620				1,620
Hurfeish	Safad	20		30	780	830
Jahula	Safad	420				420
Ja‘una	Safad	1,150				1,150
Jish	Safad	740		350		1,090
Jubb Yusuf	Safad	170				170
Kafr Bir‘im	Safad	10		700		710
Khalisa (El)	Safad	1,820		20		1,840
Kefar Gil‘adi (Tel Hai)	Safad		650			650
Khirbat el Hiqab	Safad					
Khisas	Safad	470	60			530
Khiyam el Walid	Safad	280				280
Kirad el Baqqara	Safad	360				360
Kirad el Ghannama	Safad	350				350
Lazzaza	Safad	230				230
Beit Hillel	Safad		100			100
Mahanaim	Safad		110			110
Mallaha and 'Arab Zubeid	Safad	890				890
Malikiyya (El, includes ‘Eitarun)	Safad	360				360
Manara	Safad		70			70
Mansura (El)	Safad	360				360
Mansurat el Kheit	Safad	200				200
Marus	Safad	80				80
Mazari‘ ed Daraja and Dadara (includes Dureijat, ‘Ein et Tina, Jalabina and Weiziya (‘Almin))	Safad	100				100
Meirun	Safad	290				290
Metulla (includes Deir Mamas Hura and Kafr Kila)	Safad		220			220
Mishmar hay Yarden	Safad		130			130
Muftakhira (El, includes El Barjiyat)	Safad	350				350
Mughr el Kheit	Safad	490				490
Nabi Yusha‘ (En)	Safad	70				70
Na‘ima (En)	Safad	1,030	210			1,240
Qabba‘a and Jazayir el Hindaj (includes Mughr ed Duruz)	Safad	460				460
Qadas (includes Buleida)	Safad	390				390
Qaddita	Safad	240				240
Qeitiya	Safad	940				940
Qudeiriya (El)	Safad	390				390
Ras el Ahmar (Er)	Safad	620				620
Rihaniya	Safad	290				290
Rosh Pinna	Safad		340			340
Sabalan	Safad	70				70
Safad (Urban)	Safad	9,100	2,400	430		11,930
Safsaf	Safad	910				910
Saliha (includes Marun er Ras and Yarun)	Safad	1,070				1,070
Salihiya (Es)	Safad	1,520				1,520
Sammu‘i (Es)	Safad	310				310
Sanbariya (Es)	Safad	130				130
Sa‘sa‘	Safad	1,130				1,130
Shauqa et Tahta (includes Mughr esh Sha‘ban)	Safad	200				200
She-ar Yashuv	Safad		100			100
Shuna (Esh)	Safad	170				170
Teitaba	Safad	530				530
Tuba (‘Arab el Heib)	Safad	590				590
Tuleil and El Huseiniya	Safad	340				340
Ulmaniya (El)	Safad	260				260
Weiziya	Safad					
Yarda	Safad					
Yesud ham Ma‘ala (includes El Kharrar)	Safad	10	250			260
Zanghariya (Zuhluq)	Safad	840				840
Zawiya (Ez)	Safad	760				760
Zuq el Fauqani (Ez)	Safad					
Zuq et Tahtani (Ez)	Safad	1,050				1,050
Nomads	Safad	820				820
Afikim	Tiberias		790			790
Ashdot Ya‘aqov	Tiberias		1,020			1,020
Beit Gan	Tiberias		170			170
Beit Zera‘ (Kefar Gun)	Tiberias		310			310
Bitanya	Tiberias					
Dahamiya	Tiberias	390		20		410
Deganiya “A”	Tiberias		290			290
Deganiya “B”	Tiberias		380			380
Eilabun	Tiberias	20		530		550
Ein Gev (Nugeib)	Tiberias	310	420		10	740
Ghuweir Abu Shusha	Tiberias	1,240				1,240
Gennossar	Tiberias		210			210
Hadatha	Tiberias	520				520
Hamma (El)	Tiberias	290				290
Hittin	Tiberias	1,190				1,190
Kafr Kama	Tiberias	660				660
Kafr Sabt	Tiberias	480				480
Kefar Hittim	Tiberias		230			230
Khirbat el Wa‘ra es Sauda (El Mawasi and El Wuheib)	Tiberias	1,870				1,870
Kinneret Group	Tiberias		460			460
Kinneret	Tiberias		220			220
Lubiya	Tiberias	2,350				2,350
Ma‘dhar	Tiberias	480				480
Maghar and El Mansura	Tiberias	90		800	1,250	2,140
Majdal	Tiberias	360				360
Manara (El)	Tiberias	490				490
Nasr ed Din	Tiberias	90				90
Menahamiyya	Tiberias		230			230
Migdal	Tiberias		240			240
Mitspa	Tiberias		90			90
Nimrin	Tiberias	320				320
Poriya	Tiberias		130			130
Samakh	Tiberias	3,320		130	10	3,460
Massada	Tiberias		270			270
Sha‘ar hag Golan	Tiberias		330			330
Samakiya (Es)	Tiberias	330		50		380
Samra (Es, includes Kafr Harib lands)	Tiberias	280			10	290
Sejera (Ilaniya)	Tiberias		240			240
Sha‘ara and ‘Omer	Tiberias		90			90
Shajara (Esh)	Tiberias	720		50		770
Sharona	Tiberias		110			110
Shorashim	Tiberias					
Tabigha (Et, includes Tell el Hunud and Khan el Minya)	Tiberias	310		20		330
Tiberias (Urban)	Tiberias	4,540	6,000	760	10	11,310
Tiberias (Rural)	Tiberias		130			130
Ubeidiya (El)	Tiberias	870				870
Ulam	Tiberias	720				720
Ya‘quq	Tiberias	210				210
Yavne’el	Tiberias		590			590
Mishmar hash Shelosha	Tiberias		150			150
Anabta and Iktaba	Tulkarm	3,080		40		3,120
Attara (El)	Tulkarm	250				250
Attil	Tulkarm	2,650				2,650
Avihayil	Tulkarm		350			350
Azzun and En Nabi Ilyas and ‘Isla	Tulkarm	1,170		20		1,190
Bal‘a	Tulkarm	2,220				2,220
Baqa el Gharbiya (includes Manshiyat Baqa)	Tulkarm	2,240				2,240
Baqa esh Sharqiya	Tulkarm	480				480
Beit Lid	Tulkarm	960				960
Beit Yannai	Tulkarm		50			50
Beit Yitshaq	Tulkarm		310			310
Benei Binyamin	Tulkarm		130			130
Birkat Ramadan	Tulkarm					
Bitan	Tulkarm		50			50
Dannaba	Tulkarm	740				740
Deir el Ghusun (includes Khirbat el Masqifa, El Marja, Khirbat Jarishiya, Khirbat Bir es Sikka, Khirbat Yamma and Khirbat Ibthan)	Tulkarm	2,860				2,860
Ein ha Horesh	Tulkarm		320			320
Ein ha ‘Oved	Tulkarm		80			80
Ein Vared	Tulkarm		410			410
Elyashiv	Tulkarm		310			310
Even Yehuda	Tulkarm		640			640
Falama	Tulkarm	120				120
Fardisiya	Tulkarm	20				20
Far‘un	Tulkarm	700		10		710
Gan Hayim	Tulkarm		160			160
Ghabat el ‘Ababisha	Tulkarm					
Ghabat Jayyus	Tulkarm					
Ghabat Kafr Sur	Tulkarm	740				740
Beit Yehoshua‘	Tulkarm		180			180
Kafr Netter	Tulkarm		90			90
Tel Yitshaq	Tulkarm		120			120
Ghabat Miska	Tulkarm					
Ghabat et Taiyiba el Qibliya	Tulkarm					
Ghabat et Taiyiba esh Shamaliya	Tulkarm					
Giv‘at Hayim	Tulkarm		570			570
Giv‘at Shappira	Tulkarm					
Habla	Tulkarm	580				580
Havatselet hash Sharon	Tulkarm		50			50
Herut	Tulkarm		380			380
Hibbat Zion	Tulkarm		100			100
Hogla	Tulkarm		210			210
Ilar	Tulkarm	1,450				1,450
Irtah	Tulkarm	1,060				1,060
Jaiyus	Tulkarm	830				830
Jajuliya	Tulkarm	740				740
Jatt	Tulkarm	1,120				1,120
Kafr ‘Abbush (includes Khirbat Abu Harfil)	Tulkarm	480				480
Kafr Bara	Tulkarm	150				150
Kafr Jammal	Tulkarm	690				690
Kafr el Labad	Tulkarm	940				940
Kafr Qasim	Tulkarm	1,460				1,460
Kafr Rumman	Tulkarm	270				270
Kafr Saba	Tulkarm	1,270				1,270
Kafr Sur	Tulkarm	450		10		460
Kafr Thulth	Tulkarm	1,290				1,290
Kafr Zibad	Tulkarm	1,590				1,590
Kefar Hayim	Tulkarm		320			320
Kefar ha Ro‘eh	Tulkarm		380			380
Kefar Hess	Tulkarm		360			360
Kefar Vitkin	Tulkarm		890			890
Kefar Yona	Tulkarm		480			480
Khirbat Beit Lid	Tulkarm	460				460
Khirbat el Jalama	Tulkarm	70				70
Khirbat Khureish	Tulkarm					
Khirbat Manshiya	Tulkarm	260				260
Khirbat ez Zabibda	Tulkarm					
Khirbat Zalafa (includes Khirbat Birkat Ghaziya)	Tulkarm	210				210
Kur	Tulkarm	280				280
Ma‘abarot	Tulkarm		330			330
Mishmar hash Sharon	Tulkarm		310			310
Miska	Tulkarm	880				880
Sede Warburg	Tulkarm		180			180
Moshav Gan Hayim	Tulkarm					
Natanya (Urban)	Tulkarm		5,070			5,070
Nazla el Gharbiya (En)	Tulkarm	100				100
Nazla esh Sharqiya (En)	Tulkarm	300				300
Nazla el Wusta (En)	Tulkarm	60				60
Nazlat Abu Nar	Tulkarm	20				20
Nazlat ‘Isa	Tulkarm	380				380
Nira	Tulkarm		60			60
Qadima	Tulkarm		190			190
Qaffin (includes Khirbat el ‘Aqqaba and Khirbat esh Sheikh Meisar)	Tulkarm	1,570				1,570
Qalansuwa	Tulkarm	1,540				1,540
Tsur Moshe	Tulkarm		240			240
Qalqilya	Tulkarm	5,840		10		5,850
Qaqun	Tulkarm	1,970				1,970
Ramat hak Kovesh	Tulkarm		520			520
Ramin	Tulkarm	630				630
Raml Zeita (Khirbat Qazaza)	Tulkarm	140				140
Ras (Er)	Tulkarm	160				160
Safarin	Tulkarm	530				530
Seida	Tulkarm	450				450
Shufa	Tulkarm	370				370
Shuweika	Tulkarm	2,370				2,370
Tabsar (Khirbat ‘Azzun)	Tulkarm					
Taiyiba (Et) (includes Khirbat el ‘Amarin, Nuseirat, Khirbat Takla)	Tulkarm	4,290				4,290
Kefar Ya‘etz	Tulkarm		110			110
Tel Mond	Tulkarm		390			390
Tel Tsur	Tulkarm		120			120
Tira (Et)	Tulkarm	3,180				3,180
Tsofit (d)	Tulkarm		220			220
Tulkarm (Urban)	Tulkarm	7,790		280	20	8,090
Umm Khalid	Tulkarm	960		10		970
Wadi el Hawarith (North)	Tulkarm	850				850
Wadi el Hawarith (South)	Tulkarm	480				480
Wadi Qabbani	Tulkarm	320				320
Yedidiya	Tulkarm		220			220
Zeita	Tulkarm	1,780				1,780
Tribal Units	Tulkarm					
Total		1061270	553600	135550	14100	1764520

== See also ==
- 1922 census of Palestine
- 1931 census of Palestine
