= Sheikh Danun =

Sheikh Dannun: שֵּׁיח' דַּנּוּן (Hebrew); الشيخ دنون (Arabic)

Hebrew transcription(s)
  - Official: Sheikh Dannun
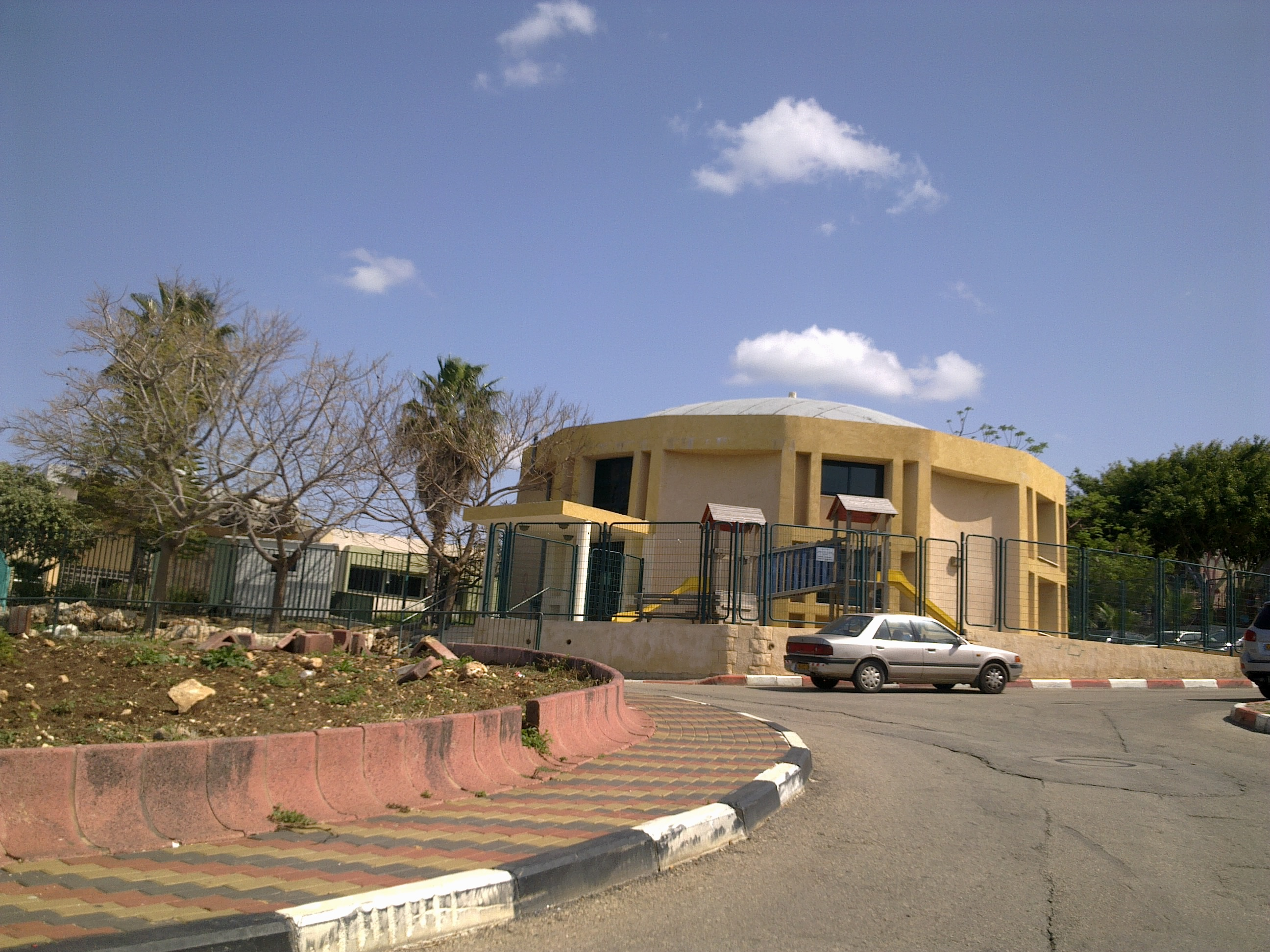
- School in Sheikh Danun
- Etymology: The shrine of Sheik Dannun, The shrine of Sheik David
- Location within Northwest Israel Location within Israel
- Coordinates: 32°59′30″N 35°8′52″E
- Grid position: 164/266 PAL
- Country: Israel
- District: Northern
- Subdistrict: Acre
- Council: Mateh Asher
- Population (2024): 2,996

Sheikh Dannun (Arabic: الشيخ دنون, Hebrew: שֵּׁיח' דַּנּוּן); also transliterated as Sheikh Danun and Sheikh Danon) is an Arab village located in Israel's Northern District. Since 1948, it has been made up of two old villages – Shaykh Danun and Shaykh Dawud (or Daud, meaning "David") – which were merged, and are now jointly referred to as Sheikh Dannun. Located on a hill overlooking the plains of Acre, both of these old villages were built around a tomb for a sheikh, and share a similar history. It falls under the jurisdiction of Mateh Asher Regional Council, and in 2024 it had a population of 2,996.

== History ==
The history of the site is ancient. Burial chambers dated to the Intermediate Bronze Age were discovered in the north of the modern day village, at the end of a shaft leading from a man-made cave carved into the northern slope of the chalk hill upon which Sheikh Dawud is situated. Potsherds dating to the Byzantine and Ottoman periods have also been collected at the site. An old quarry has been excavated, including a small area probably used as a winepress.

Khirbet Buda, another ancient site identified at the southeast corner of the modern village, contains remains from the Roman or Byzantine period. These include three oil presses, tombs with loculi of which one is engraved with a cross, and one grave with a square courtyard containing three arcosolia. Under the name Kfar Barada (possibly a calligraphic error) it was mentioned as part of the domain of the Crusaders during the hudna between the Crusaders based in Acre and the Mamluk sultan al-Mansur (Qalawun) in 1283.

=== Ottoman Empire ===
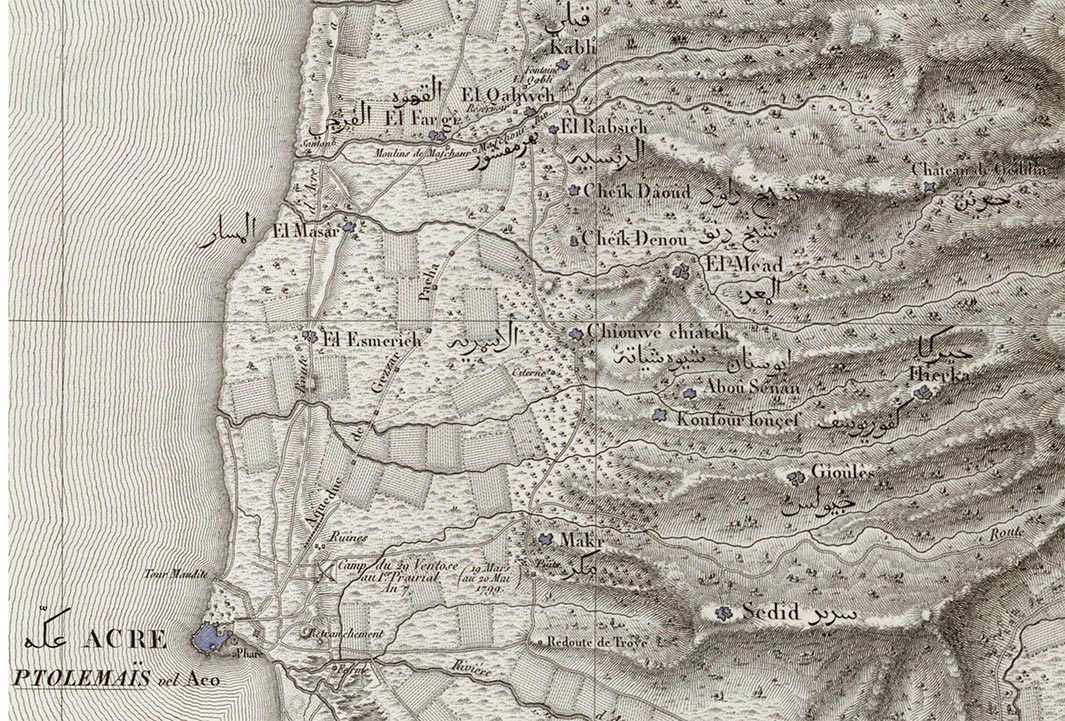
Jacotin's map of the area, in 1799

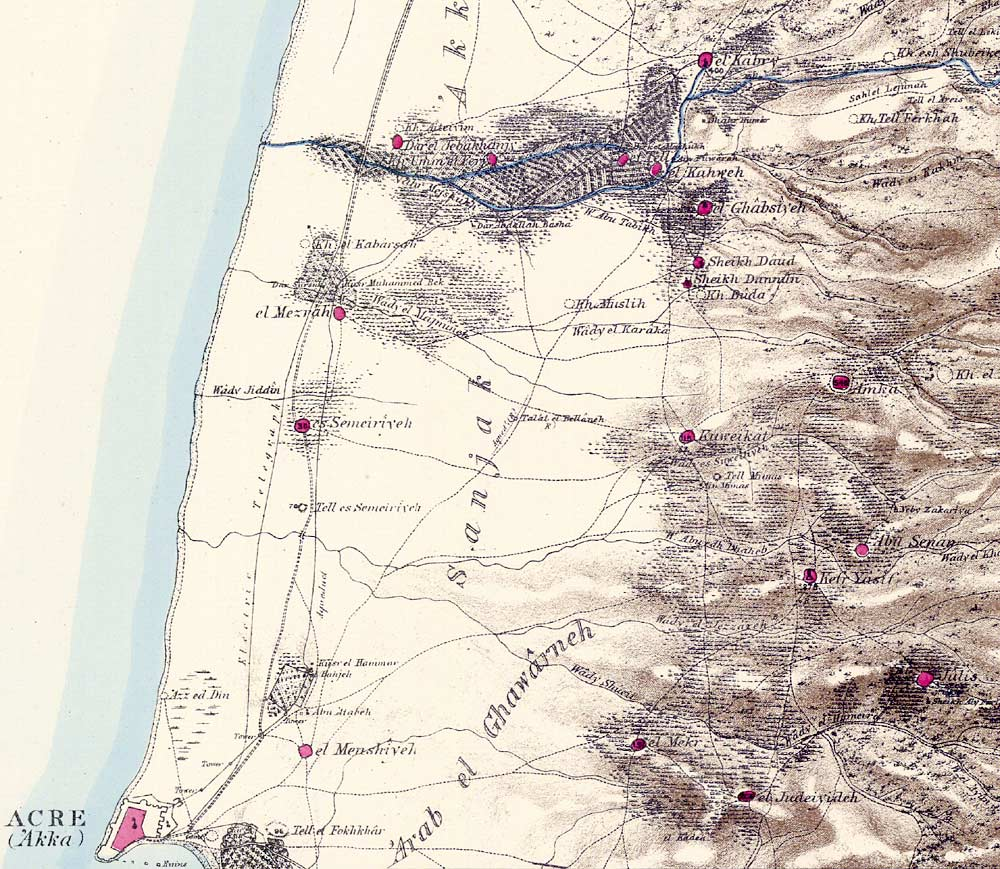
Survey of Western Palestine map from 1880, showing the area, including Kh. Buda

A map by Pierre Jacotin from Napoleon's invasion of 1799 shows both places, named as Cheik Daoud and Cheik Denou.

Both villages are mentioned in the writings of Western travellers to Ottoman Palestine in the 19th century. Andrew Alexander Bonar and Robert Murray M'Cheyne who visited in the mid-19th century describe Sheikh Daud as one of many small villages scattered over a "beautiful plain", located just off the road, that was "once a Christian village." V. Guérin, who visited the place later that same century, described Danun as a hamlet grouped around the tomb of Shaykh Danun. Of the shrine (wali) in neighbouring Shaykh Dawud, he writes that it was surmounted by two domes, one larger than the other and estimated the population of that hamlet to be about 50. One house in the village is described as larger and better built than the others and said to belong to a powerful sheikh.

In 1881, the PEF's Survey of Western Palestine (SWP) writes of Shaykh Danun that it was a "small village, built of stone and mud, contains about 50 Muslims, on the edge of a plain, with stream of water near." Shaykh Dawud is similarly described, but with 70 Muslims, and "surrounded by olives and arable land."

A population list from about 1887 showed that Sheikh Daud had about 320 inhabitants, all Muslim.

=== British Mandate ===
At the time of the 1922 census of Palestine conducted by the British Mandate, Shaikh Danun had a population of 106, while Sheikh Daud had 193 people, all Muslims. The 1931 census listed 39 inhabited houses in Sheikh Danun, populated by 155 Muslim inhabitants. Sheikh Dawud had 48 houses, inhabited by 222 Muslims.

In the 1945 statistics, the population was counted with the nearby villages of Al-Ghabisiyya and Shaykh Dawud. Together, they had 690 inhabitants, still all Muslim, and 11,771 dunums of land. Of this, a total of 6,633 dunums of land in the three villages were used for cereals, 1,371 dunums were irrigated or used for orchards, while 58 dunams were built-up (urban) land.

=== Israel ===
According to Dawud Bader, Sheikh Danun has later received many new inhabitants, including internally displaced persons from the depopulated Arab villages of al-Ghabisiyya, Amqa, Kuwaykat, al-Nahr and Umm al-Faraj.

== Shrines ==
A report by the Palestine Antiquities Department (1931) on Shaykh Danun found that the village contained a built Maqam (shrine), with a few houses and rock-cuttings located nearby. Andrew Petersen, an archaeologist specializing in Islamic architecture, visited the Maqam Shaykh Danun in 1991, and notes that though it is hidden amongst houses, it is visible because of its tall white dome. He describes the shrine as consisting of two parts: one modern concrete annex on the north side, and one older part containing a prayer room and a mausoleum. The prayer room was built after the mausoleum, probably during the period of Ottoman rule in Palestine. A large square room roofed by a large dome, it has a mihrab in the south wall, next to a modern stone minbar. The mausoleum has an iwan at its north end, and the stone cenotaph beneath it is covered in green cloth. Below a wooden frame in the middle of the room is the entrance to a cave. Based on the design, Petersen determined that the mausoleum may date to the Mamluk era, while the cave is probably a Byzantine era tomb that was subsequently reused.

The Maqam Shaykh Dawud stands in the middle of a cemetery on the summit of a hill. It is covered by two large domes and one smaller one. The interior is divided into two parts, consisting of a prayer room and a mausoleum. The mausoleum contains two cenotaphs. According to the villagers, Dawud (Arabic for "David") was a Muslim warrior who died fighting the Crusaders. Petersen dates the mausoleum to the medieval period (i.e. pre-16th century), while the prayer room might be newer, possibly from Ottoman times.

== Demographics ==
Sheikh Danun is one of the two Arab localities in Mateh Asher Regional Council. According to the Israel Central Bureau of Statistics (2006), the village had a population of 2,300 mostly Muslim inhabitants.

== Voting Patterns ==
In the 2026 election, 95 percent of voters in Sheikh Danun voted for the Arab parties, while 3 percent voted for the parties of the center-left coalition led by Gadi Eisenkot and 0.3 percent voted for the parties of the right-wing coalition led by Benjamin Netanyahu. Among the voters for the Arab parties, 57 percent voted for the Joint List, while 43 percent voted for Ra'am. Voter turnout increased 62 percent from the 2022 election.

== See also ==
- Arab localities in Israel

== Bibliography ==
- Barag, Dan (1979). "A new source concerning the ultimate borders of the Latin Kingdom of Jerusalem". Israel Exploration Journal. 29: 197–217.
- Barron, J.B., ed. (1923). Palestine: Report and General Abstracts of the Census of 1922. Government of Palestine.
- Bonar, A.; M'Cheyne, R.M. (1849). Narrative of a mission of inquiry to the Jews from the Church of Scotland in 1839 (3rd ed.). Whyte (Original from Harvard University). p. 315.
- Conder, C.R.; Kitchener, H.H. (1881). The Survey of Western Palestine: Memoirs of the Topography, Orography, Hydrography, and Archaeology. Vol. 1. London: Committee of the Palestine Exploration Fund.
- Dauphin, C. (1998). La Palestine byzantine, Peuplement et Populations. BAR International Series 726 (in French). Vol. III : Catalogue. Oxford: Archeopress. ISBN 0-860549-05-4.
- Getzov, Abdallah (1 April 2008). Sheikh Danon, Esh-Sheikh Dawud Final Report. Vol. 120. Hadashot Arkheologiyot – Excavations and Surveys in Israel.
- Government of Palestine, Department of Statistics (1945). Village Statistics, April, 1945.
- Guérin, V. (1880). Description Géographique Historique et Archéologique de la Palestine (in French). Vol. 3: Galilee, pt. 2. Paris: L'Imprimerie Nationale.
- Hadawi, S. (1970). Village Statistics of 1945: A Classification of Land and Area ownership in Palestine. Palestine Liberation Organization Research Center.
- Karmon, Y. (1960). "An Analysis of Jacotin's Map of Palestine" (PDF). Israel Exploration Journal. 10 (3, 4): 155–173, 244–253.
- Masalha, N. (2005). Catastrophe remembered: Palestine, Israel and the internal refugees : essays. Zed Books. ISBN 9781842776230.
- Mills, E., ed. (1932). Census of Palestine 1931. Population of Villages, Towns and Administrative Areas. Jerusalem: Government of Palestine.
- Palmer, E.H. (1881). The Survey of Western Palestine: Arabic and English Name Lists Collected During the Survey by Lieutenants Conder and Kitchener, R. E. Transliterated and Explained by E.H. Palmer. Committee of the Palestine Exploration Fund.
- Petersen, Andrew (2001). A Gazetteer of Buildings in Muslim Palestine (British Academy Monographs in Archaeology). Vol. 1. Oxford University Press. ISBN 978-0-19-727011-0.
- Porat, Leea (31 July 2006). "Sheikh Danon, Esh-Sheikh Dawud Final Report". 118. Hadashot Arkheologiyot – Excavations and Surveys in Israel.
- Schumacher, G. (1888). "Population list of the Liwa of Akka". Quarterly Statement - Palestine Exploration Fund. 20: 169–191.
