= Netiv HaShayara =

Netiv HaShayara: נְתִיב הַשַּׁיָּרָה (Hebrew)

Hebrew transcription(s)
  - Unofficial: Nativ HaShayara
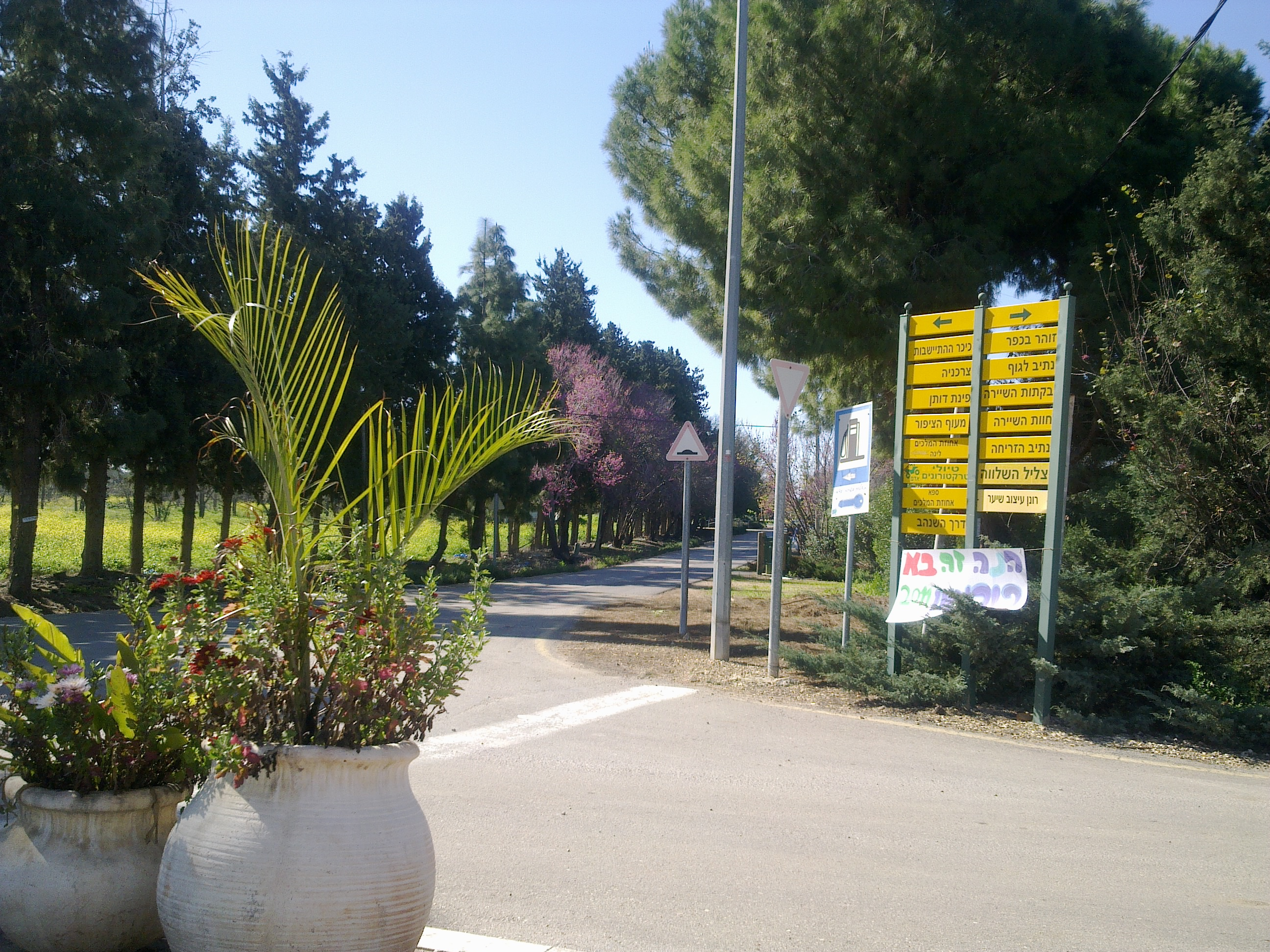
- Etymology: Path of the Convoy
- Location within Northwest Israel Location within Israel
- Coordinates: 32°59′41″N 35°8′12″E
- Country: Israel
- District: Northern
- Subdistrict: Acre
- Council: Mateh Asher
- Affiliation: Moshavim Movement
- Founded: 1950
- Founder: Iraqi and Persian Jews
- Population (2024): 463

Netiv HaShayara (Hebrew: נְתִיב הַשַּׁיָּרָה, lit. 'Path of the Convoy') is a moshav in northern Israel. Located near Nahariya, it falls under the jurisdiction of Mateh Asher Regional Council. In 2024 it had a population of 463.

== History ==
The village was established in 1950 by immigrants from Iran and Iraq, on the lands of the depopulated Palestinian village of al-Ghabisiyya. It was originally named "Doveh" ("plenty"), and later named after the Yehiam convoy (Shayeret Yehiam), which tried to break into the besieged Yehiam during the 1948 Arab-Israeli War.
