= List of Phoenician cities =

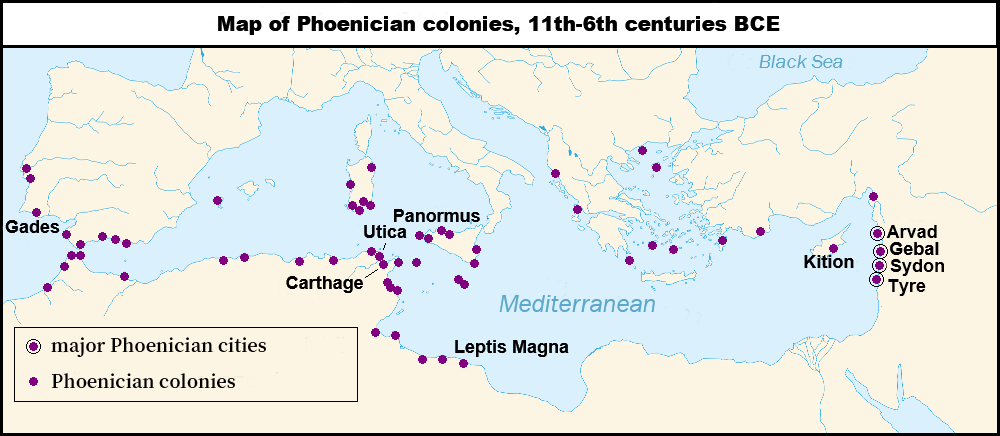
Phoenician colonies

This is a list of cities and colonies of Phoenicia in modern-day Lebanon, coastal Syria, northern Israel, as well as cities founded or developed by the Phoenicians in the Eastern Mediterranean area, North Africa, Southern Europe, and the islands of the Mediterranean Sea.

== Levant ==
=== Lebanon ===
- Tyre - One of the two leading-city states of Phoenicia and one of the most important ports in ancient Phoenicia, and Lebanon today.
- Sydon - One of the two leading city-states of Phoenicia
- Ampi
- Amia
- Arqa
- Baalbek
- Botrys
- Berut
- Gebal - One of the oldest sites of civilization
- Sarepta
- Tripoli, Lebanon

=== Syria ===
- Arvad
- Latakia - also known by its Phoenician name, Ramitha
- Tartus
- Amrit
- Carne

=== Israel ===
- Achziv
- Acre
- Atlit
- Belus
- Tel Tanninim
- Dora
- Elyakhin
- Kabri
- Michal
- Haifa - Tel Shikmona
- Jaffa
- Reshef
- Caesarea
- Tell Abu Hawam
- Tel Mevorakh

== Eastern Mediterranean ==
=== Turkey ===
- Myriandus - in modern-day Turkey
- Sam'al - Cilicia; in modern-day Turkey. Fortress city protecting the trade route to Anatolia
- Karatepe
- Finike - historically known as Phoenicus
- Rhosos - according Malalas chronography that city was founded by Cilix, son of Agenor the Phoenician King.

=== Cyprus ===
- Kition, also known as Citium (in Latin)
- Salamis
- Lapethos
- Tamassos
- Idalium

== North Africa ==
=== Algeria ===
- Hippo Regius
- Tipasa
- Russicada
- Icosium
- Arsenaria
- Arzew - old name of Bethioua (not confused with the new Arzew)

=== Libya ===
- Oea
- Sabratha
- Leptis Magna - major city on the Libyan coastline
- Tripoli - capital

=== Morocco ===
- Lixus
- Tangier
- Mehidya (ancient Thymaterion)
- El-Jadida (ancient Gytte)
- Oualidia (ancient Melitta)
- Sala

=== Mauritania or Western Sahara ===
- Cerne (Unknown whether Cerne was in Mauritania or Western Sahara)

=== Tunisia ===
- Carthage - the most powerful of the Phoenician settlements, eventually being destroyed by the Romans
- Utica - earliest settlement in Africa
- Hippo Diarrhytus - now Bizerte, the northernmost city in Africa
- Hadrumetum
- Ruspina
- Leptis Parva
- Thapsus
- Kerkouane
- Zama Regia - the last place Hannibal fought and the place where his first and only major defeat occurred
- Vaga

== Europe / Elsewhere ==
=== France ===
- Aleria

=== Italy ===
- Motya
- Soluntum
- Lilybaeum, also known as Marsala
- Lampas (ancient city) (Lampedusa)
- Kosyra (Pantelleria)
- Nora
- Sulcis
- Tharros
- Olbia
- Cagliari- capital of Sardinia
- Palermo- capital of Sicily

=== Malta ===
- Mdina
- Rabat
- Burmula, (Bormla/Cospicua)De Soldanis/G.F. Abela/Achille Ferris

=== Monaco ===
- Monaco

=== Portugal ===
- Lisbon-capital city

=== Spain ===
- Cádiz also known as Gades - earliest Phoenician settlement in Spain
- Cartagena - the capital city founded by Hamilcar Barca of Carthage after conquering the Iberian tribes
- Seville
- Córdoba
- Almuñécar
- Rusadir
- La Fonteta (Guardamar del Segura)
- Trayamar
- Baria-Villaricos
- Abdera
- Málaga
- Huelva
- Ibiza
- Lebrija
- San Roque

== Sources ==
- Phoenicia - From the Encyclopedia of the Orient
