= Moshe Prausnitz =

Israeli archaeologist (1922–1998)

- משה פראוסניץ
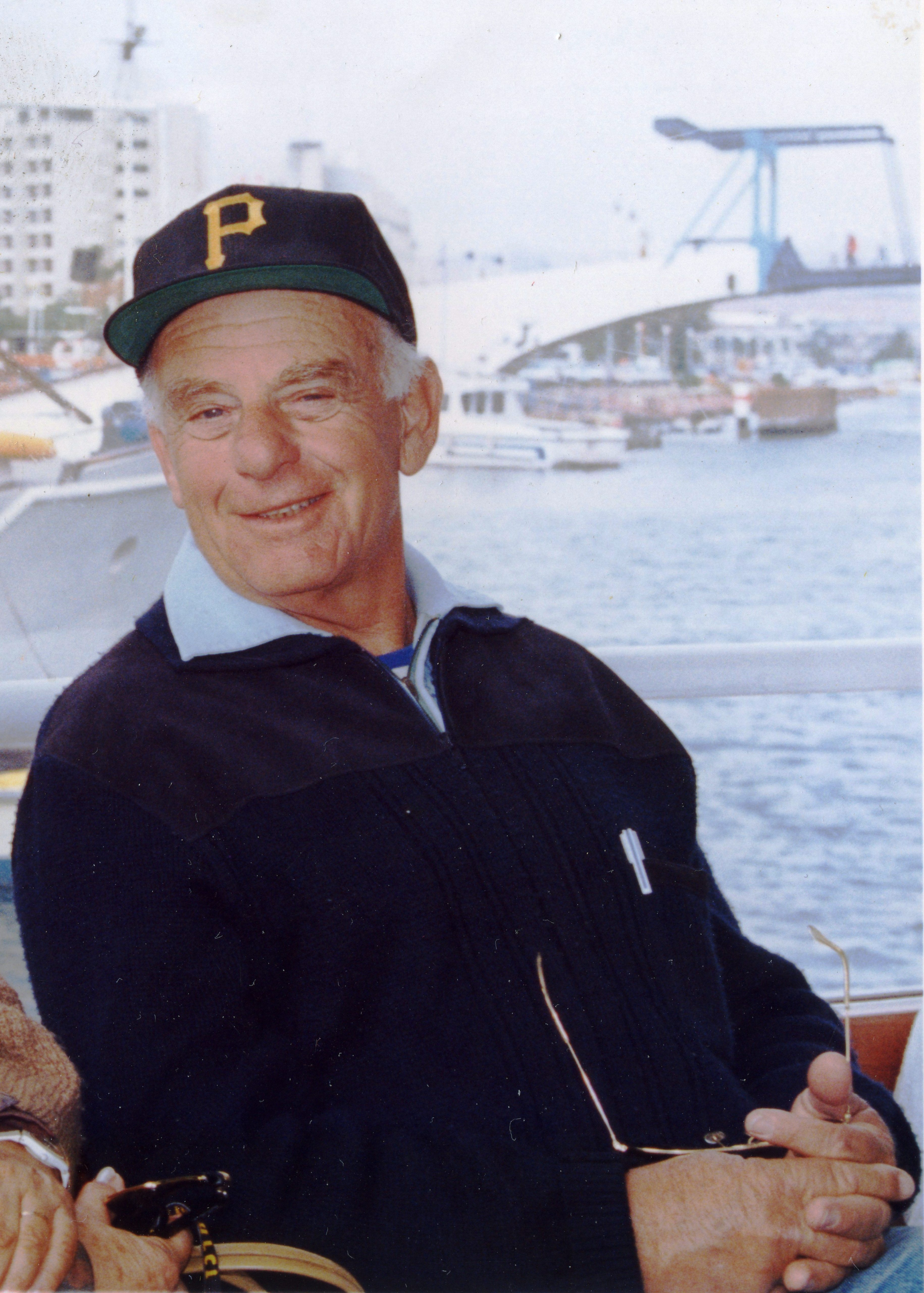
- Born: Moshe W. Prausnitz; 8 December 1922; Berlin, Germany
- Died: 1 July 1998 (aged 75); Jerusalem, Israel
- Occupation: Archaeologist

Moshe (Max) W. Prausnitz (Hebrew: משה פראוסניץ; 22 December 1922 – 1 July 1998) was an Israeli archaeologist who specialized in the prehistory field.

== Biography ==
Prausnitz was born in Berlin, Germany in 1922. He moved to Mandatory Palestine with his family in 1937 at the age of 15, and lived on Mount Carmel in Haifa. After the Second World War ended he studied at the University of Edinburgh in Scotland. In 1953 he went to study in England under V. Gordon Childe, an Australian archaeologist and philologist who specialized in the study of European prehistory. He did his doctoral studies at the Hebrew University of Jerusalem. His seminar dealt with Neolithic flint and was published as a book called "From Hunter to Farmer and Trader".

Prausnitz worked at the Israel Antiquities Authority. His first work was in excavations in Caesarea Maritima as a helper to Prof. Shmuel Yeivin who was head of the Israel Antiquities Authority at the time. The first excavation he was in charge of took place in Rosh HaNikra.

Cover of the P.H.D seminar

Among his excavations: the cemetery of Tell Abu Hawam (1952); Remnants of a church and a Byzantine settlement in Shavei Tzion (1955); Cemeteries at Tel Achziv (1958–1998) with the Istituto di Vicine Oriente in Rome, an excavation which Eilat Mazar continues to carry out. Tel Eli, a prehistoric site at the south end of the Sea of Galilee; Tel Kabri; A prehistoric site in Herzlia; A prehistoric site in Neve Yam with his colleague and friend Eliezer Wreschner; Evron quarry near Naharia, a site from the Early Paleolithic period with Prof. Avraham Ronen; Rosh Maya near Haifa and more.

Prausnitz worked as the editor of Mitekufat Haeven - Journal of the Israel Prehistoric Society (reads as "Mitkufat ha-Even").

He died in the summer of 1998 at the age of 75, and was buried in Givat Shaul cemetery in Jerusalem. He left a wife and three children. His bequest was transferred to the Antiquities Authority which promised to publish the hitherto inedited report on the Achziv excavations.
