= Tell es-Samak =

Ancient Phoenician tell on the eastern Mediterranean seacoast near Haifa, Israel

- תל א-סמכ (Hebrew)
- Tel Shikmona (Shiqmona)
- Location within Israel
- 32°49′30″N 34°57′19″E
- Location: Israel
- Region: Haifa

Tell es-Samak (Arabic) or Tel Shikmona (Hebrew: תל שקמונה, Arabic: تل السمك, romanized: Tell as-Samak), meaning 'mound of the fish', is an ancient Phoenician tell (mound) situated near the sea coast in the modern city of Haifa, Israel, just south of the Israeli National Institute of Oceanography. It has been called a "forgotten Phoenician site".

Initially identified as Calamon (see Tell Abu Hawam), it was later identified by Israeli archeologists as the Jewish town of Shikmona (Hebrew: תל שִׁקְמוֹנָה, romanized: Šiqmônah), also spelt Sycamine. Subsequent research found no evidence of Jewish artefacts, only Phoenician and Christian; nowadays researchers identify Tell es-Samak with Porphyreon (south). The Zinman Institute of Archaeology at the University of Haifa writes that "It was wrongly identified with the Jewish Shikmona, but the latest research suggests that it should be identified as the Christian town of Porphyreon (south)."

== History ==
In archaeology, Tel Shikmona (eight dunams) was nested adjacent to the northern ridge of the Carmel Mountain, towards the Akko bay.

=== Middle Bronze Age ===
In the transitional MB IIA-B, there was a rock-carved warrior tomb with weapons and a few scarabs. A seal was found belonging to Ya'qub-Har. The find have been speculated as being part of the Hyksos culture, but the burial dates just prior to the rise of the Hyksos in late MB IIB. The use of the scarab makes a maritime connection to Egypt, Tell el-Dab'a Stratum F being the contemporary town during MB IIA/B.

=== Iron Age ===
==== Phoenician period ====
During the Iron Age IB-II, the site was dominated by the Phoenicians between the 11th to the 6th century BCE, as suggested by large quanties of pottery fragment with Phoenician designs. It was a production center for Tyrian purple.

There have been speculations that king Ahab of Israel conquered the site to gain control over the purple dye trade. However, Ahab was rather allied to the Phoenicians and famously married the princess Jezebel.

== Archaeology ==
=== 19th century ===
Victor Guérin wrote in his 1874 Description géographique, historique et archéologique de la Palestine that he believed Tell es-Samak was Calamon / Kalamoun of the Itinerarium Burdigalense and Isaac Chelo.

It was described by the Palestine Exploration Fund in 1881 as follows:

Tell es Semak: A low hillock by the sea. It is covered, as well as the shore near it, with ruins of dressed masonry, and there appears to have been a place of some importance at this site. Pottery, glass, and marble were found, and there are tombs east of it, in the sides of Carmel. Quantities of the ashlar blocks have been taken away, the holes remaining whence they were dug out. A fragment of a capital and coins (Byzantine) were here found by the Germans. Shafts and capitals of Byzantine appearance were also dug up. Fine building stones were transported to Haifa to build houses with. Large quantities of copper coins of Constantine were found, and a Crusading coin, with the date 127[•]. The tombs are rude caves, with loculi.

=== Elgavish excavations ===
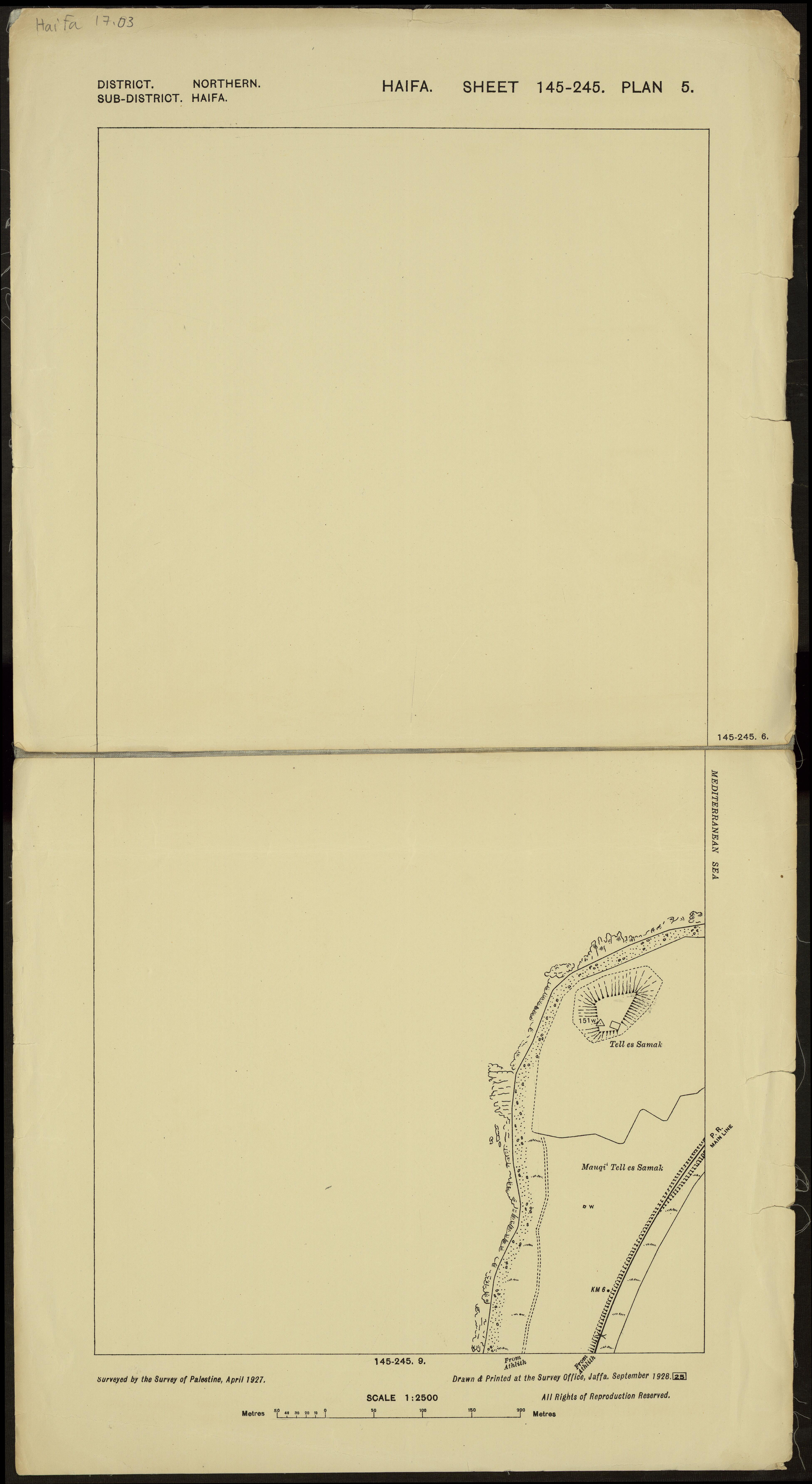
1927 map of the site from the Survey of Palestine.

The main archaeological excavations conducted at the site and in the Byzantine city south of it were carried out by the archaeologist J. Elgavish in the 1960s–70s on behalf of the Department of Museums, Municipality of Haifa.

Salvage excavations were conducted in the 1990s by the Israel Antiquities Authority (IAA) and concentrated in the eastern part of the Byzantine city, west of the Carmel Mountain slopes, where the city's necropolis is. In 2010–2011, a new series of excavation seasons was conducted by a team from the Zinman Institute of Archaeology at the University of Haifa, headed by Dr. Michael Eisenberg with Dr. Shay Bar directing the excavations on the tell itself. The goals of the project were to re-expose excavated archaeological complexes south and east of the tell previously excavated by Elgavish, expand those areas and undertake extensive conservation work in order to preserve the antiquities and present them to the public as part of Shikmona Public Park. The work also aimed to study the stratification of the tell and create a precise chronological framework.

=== Findings ===
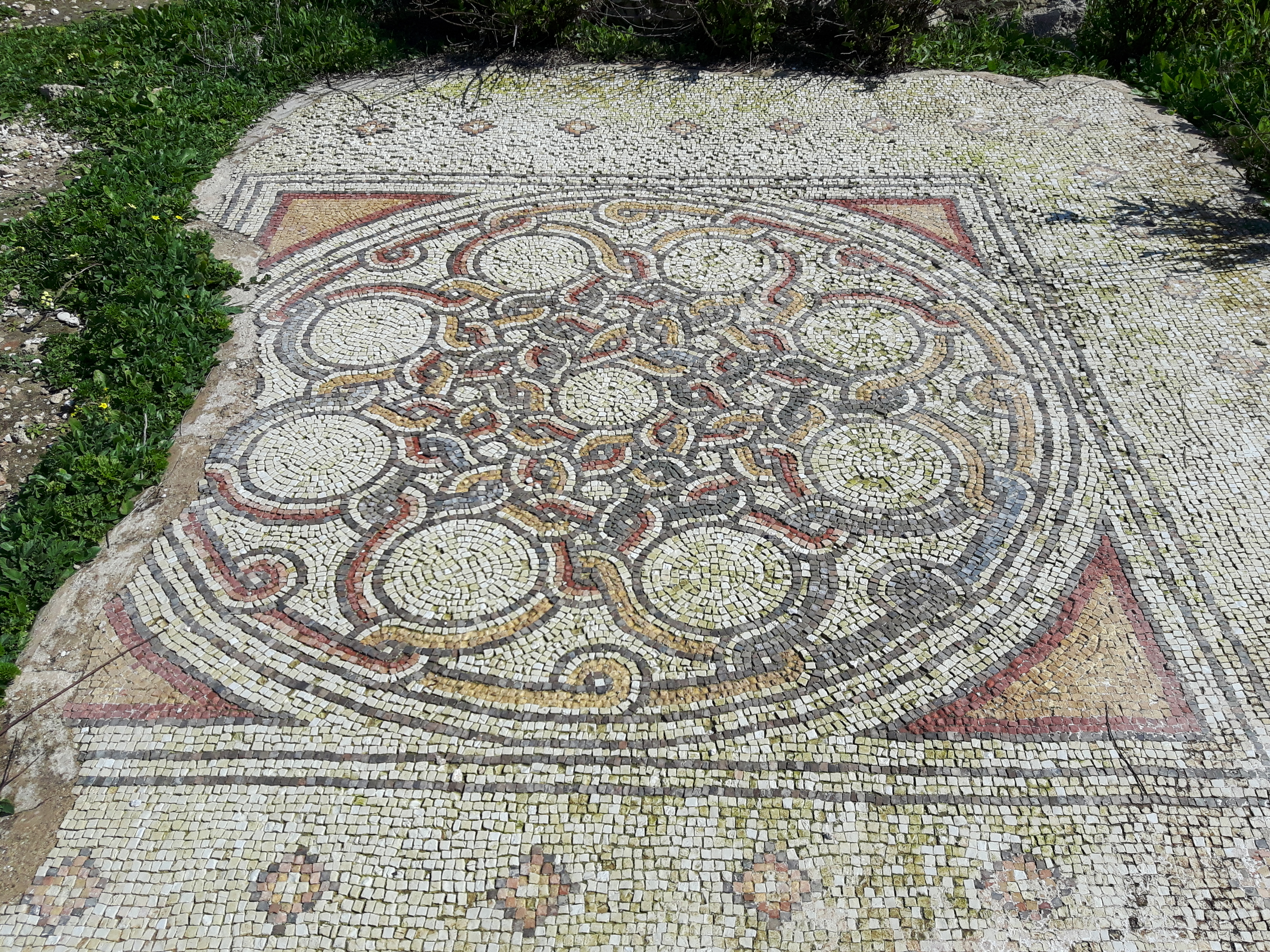
Mosaic floor at Tell es-Samak

The remains on the tell date from the Late Bronze Age to the Late Byzantine period. The lower city, east and mainly south of the tell, is dated to the Late Roman period-Byzantine period. No remains have been found dating to the Early Arab period, leading the archaeologists to conclude that Tell es-Samak was abandoned before the 7th century CE.

Tell es-Samak has yielded various types of sherds, the most common of which belonging to the red-slipped plates and bowls (Eastern sigillata A) made on the Phoenician coast during the 1st century CE. In addition, archaeologists discovered evidence for dyeing industry based on the Murex sea snail, also known as Tyrian purple, dating back to the Iron Age. The purple dye extracted from the mollusk was used by the potters of Tell es-Samak to paint pottery. After the discovery, the entire collection of painted pottery underwent a chemical analysis to determine the make-up of the paint, during which time it was confirmed that the color was an authentic purple dye extracted from the Murex sea snail.

Identification

It is agreed among scholars that the site, Tell es-Samak, has no identification so far during the Biblical periods. Latest historical and archaeological research points towards the identification of the site during Hellenistic-Byzantine periods as Porphyreon (south). This new identification fits with the clear Christian remains at the site and the absence of Jewish ones as should be expected from Tell es-Samak.

== Nature reserve and national park ==
Tell es-Samak was declared a 1,677-dunam (1.677 km^{2}; 0.647 sq mi) nature reserve in 2008. 73 dunams (0.073 km^{2}; 0.028 sq mi) were declared a national park, as well.

== See also ==
- Tell Abu Hawam

== Bibliography ==
- Conder, Claude R. (1877). "Sycaminon, Hepha, Porphyreon, and Chilzon". Palestine Exploration Quarterly. 9 (4): 187–190. doi:10.1179/peq.1877.9.4.187. ISSN 0031-0328.
