= Tell Abu Hawam =

Bronze Age city in Israel

- תל אבו הואם (Hebrew)
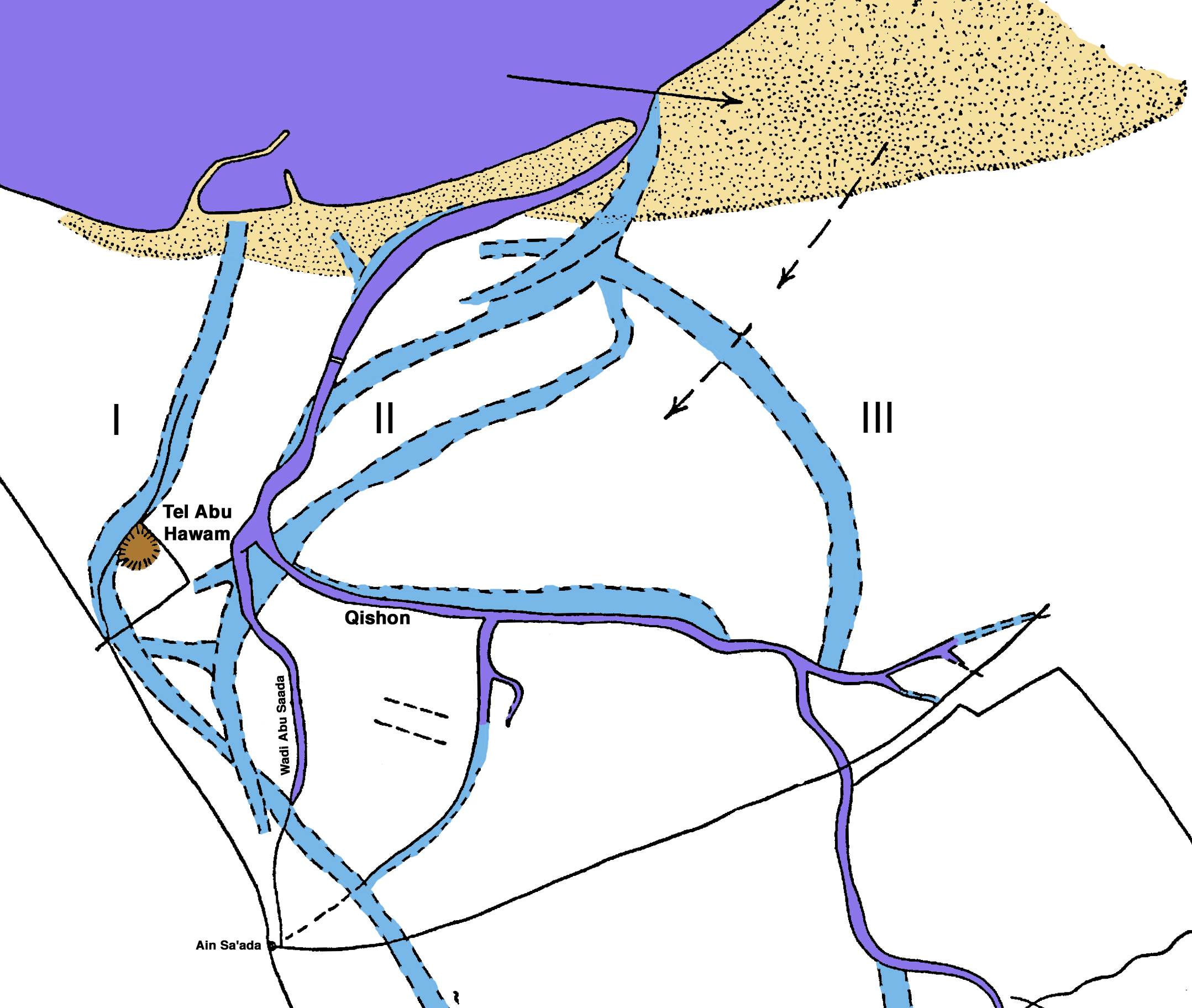
- Interactive map of Tell Abu Hawam
- 32°48′03″N 35°01′09″E
- Type: Tell
- Periods: Antiquity
- Cultures: Canaan; Phoenicia
- Location: Haifa Bay, Haifa, Israel
- Region: Levant

Site notes
- Excavation dates: 1932
- Archaeologists: Robert Hamilton; Emmanuel Anati; Moshe Prausnitz
- Management: Israel Antiquities Authority

Tell Abu Hawam is the site of a small city established in the Late Bronze Age (circa 1600 BCE) in the area of modern-day Haifa, Israel. It was known to the Crusaders as Latin: Cayphas Vetusta (Ancient Haifa) and Latin: Vetus Cayphas (Old Haifa).

It existed as a port city and a fishing village, and was moved in the late 11th century to the site which became known as Haifa el-Atika.

The site was excavated by a British expedition from 1929 to 1933.

== Archaeology ==
During the 1929-1933 British excavations, a black-glazed bowl of the "fish-plate" type was uncovered, featuring a Phoenician graffito scratched on its underside. It is suggested that the bowl may originate from the 4th or 3rd century BCE.

== Gallery ==
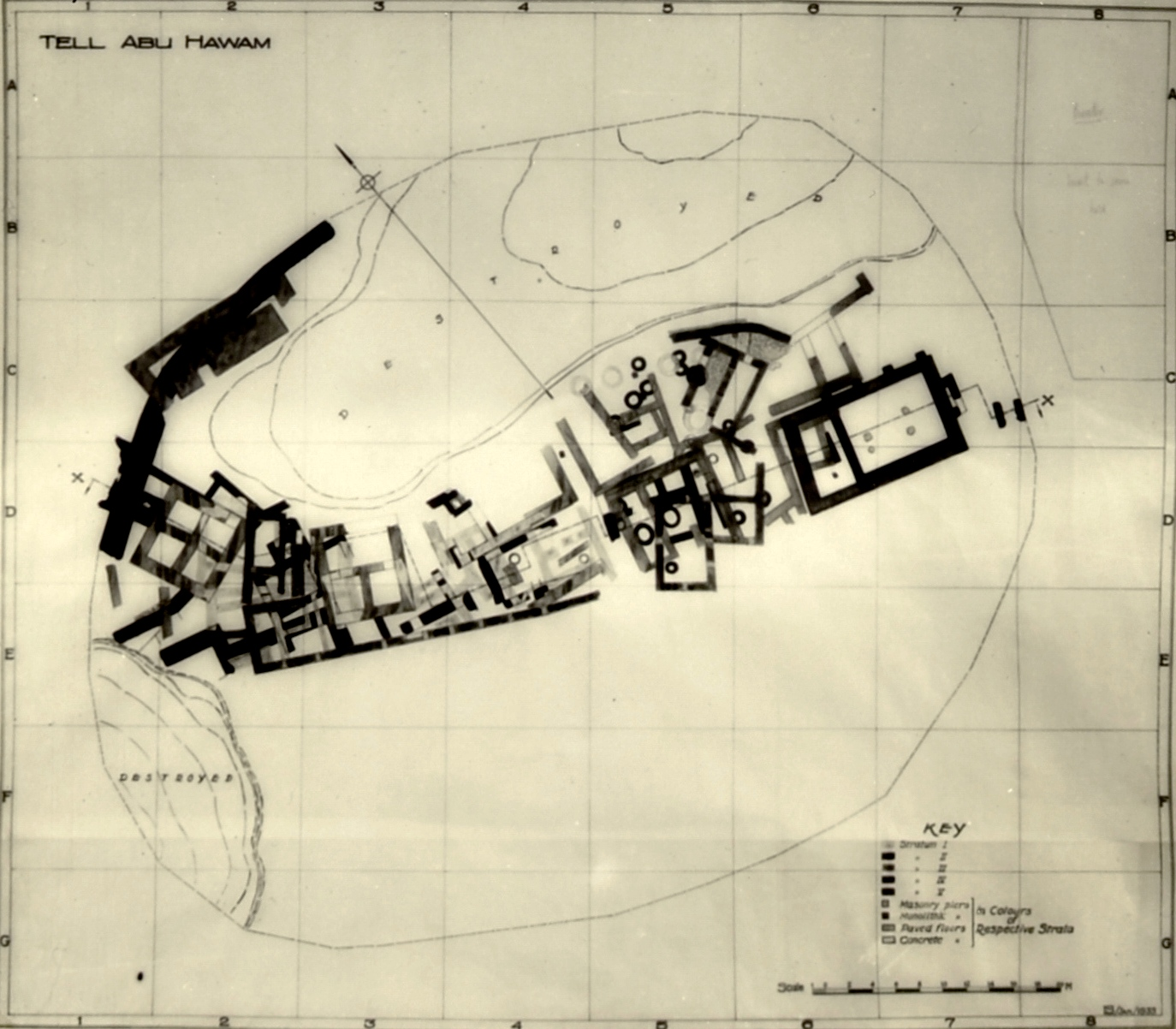
Tell Abu Hawam Plan 1932

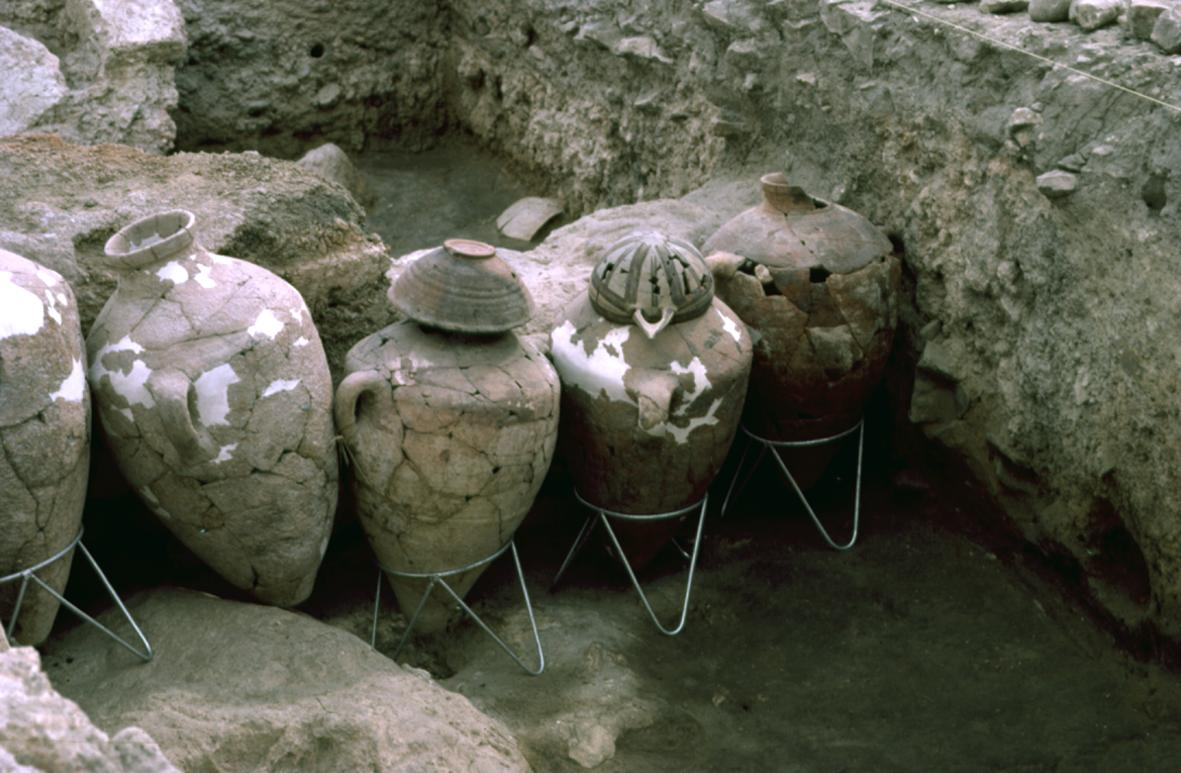
Jars excavated from the site of Tell Abu Hawam

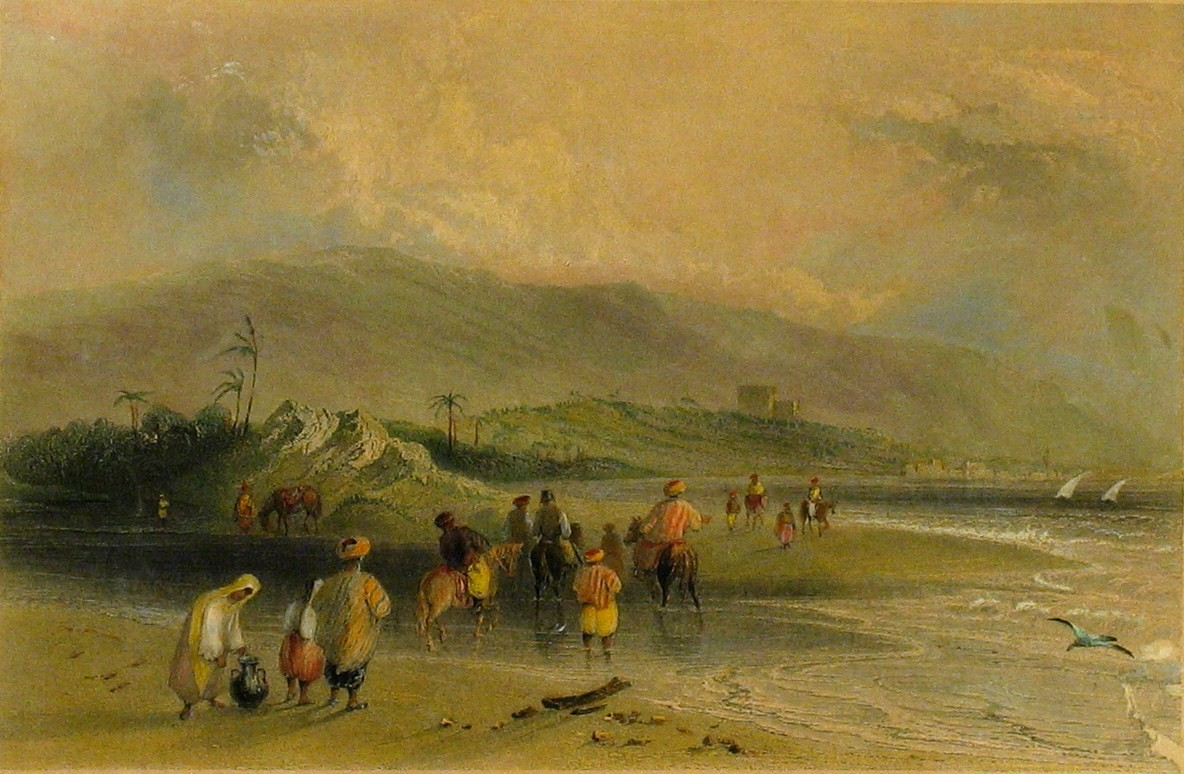
Tell Abu Hawam drawn by William Henry Bartlett

Survey of Palestine 1929 (Tell Abu Hawam on bottom right, next to a Leather Factory)

Survey of Palestine (1:10,000), 1929, showing the tell in the bottom right, on the western edge of the Kishon River

== See also ==
- History of Haifa
- List of Phoenician cities
- Tel Shikmona
