= Shavei Tzion =

Shavei Tzion: שָׁבֵי צִיּוֹן (Hebrew)
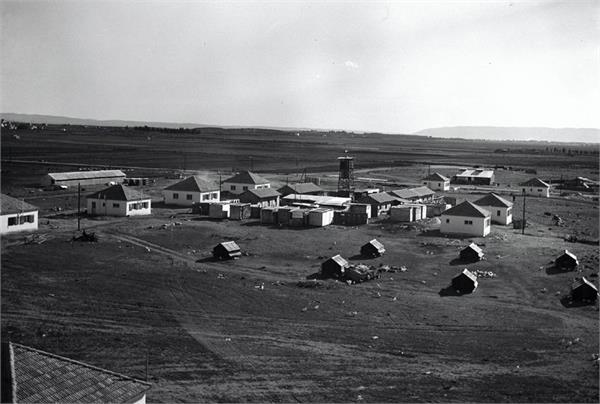
- Shavei Tzion 1939
- Etymology: Returnees to Zion
- Location within Northwest Israel Location within Israel
- Coordinates: 32°58′47″N 35°4′56″E
- Country: Israel
- District: Northern
- Subdistrict: Acre
- Council: Mateh Asher
- Affiliation: Agricultural Union
- Founded: 13 April 1938
- Founder: German Jewish refugees
- Population (2024): 1,321

Shavei Tzion (Hebrew: שָׁבֵי צִיּוֹן, lit. Returnees to Zion) is a moshav shitufi in northern Israel. Located between Acre and Nahariya and covering 2,000 dunams, it falls under the jurisdiction of Mateh Asher Regional Council. In 2024 it had a population of 1,321.

== History ==
The village was established on 13 April 1938, as part of the tower and stockade settlement project. Its founders, immigrants from Rexingen in Germany, arrived during the Fifth Aliyah fleeing from Nazi persecution. The village's construction was financed by Arthur Loewengart, a former resident of Rexingen and wealthy leather manufacturer who immigrated to the United States in 1937. Shavei Tzion is considered one of the most beautiful towns in the Galilee due to its proximity to the Mediterranean Sea.

Seven of the Acre Prison break fighters who were killed during the operation are buried in the local cemetery.

A memorial was erected on the beach in 1999, commemorating the death of 12 IDF naval commandos who fell during an ill-fated mission into Lebanon on 5 September 1997. It is composed of a dozen sandstone slabs leaning on each another, and a separate block carrying the names of the casualties – including a young officer from Shavei Tzion. The wreck of an old ship of the Israeli Navy, Kidon, which had been sunk just offshore as a tourist attraction for scuba divers, has also become a memorial site in recent years after a 2016 remembrance day ceremony organized by a local dive club, at which a memorial of Israeli flags and 12 chairs representing each of the 12 soldiers who died during the operation was set up on the wreck.

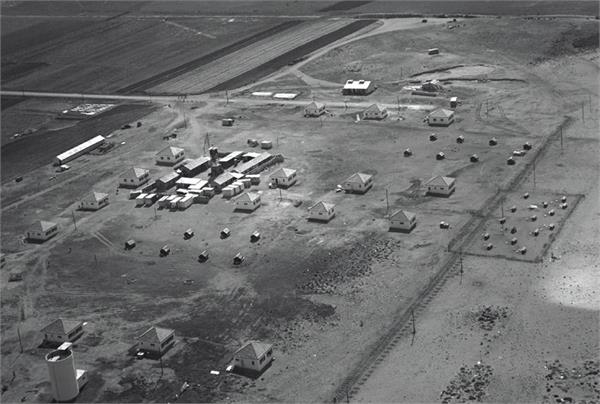
Shavei Tzion 1939

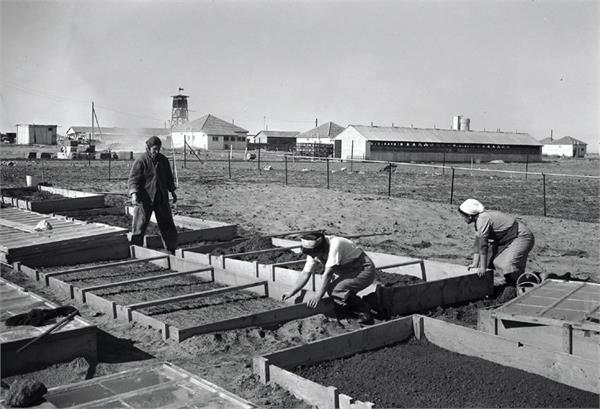
Shavei Tzion 1939

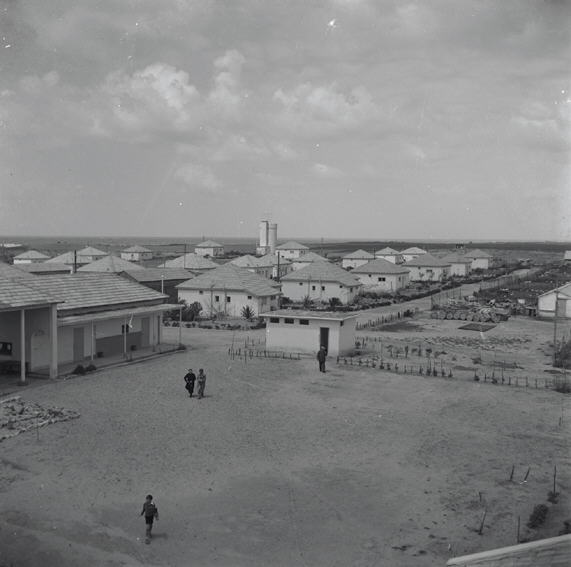
Shavei Tzion 1943

== Archaeology ==
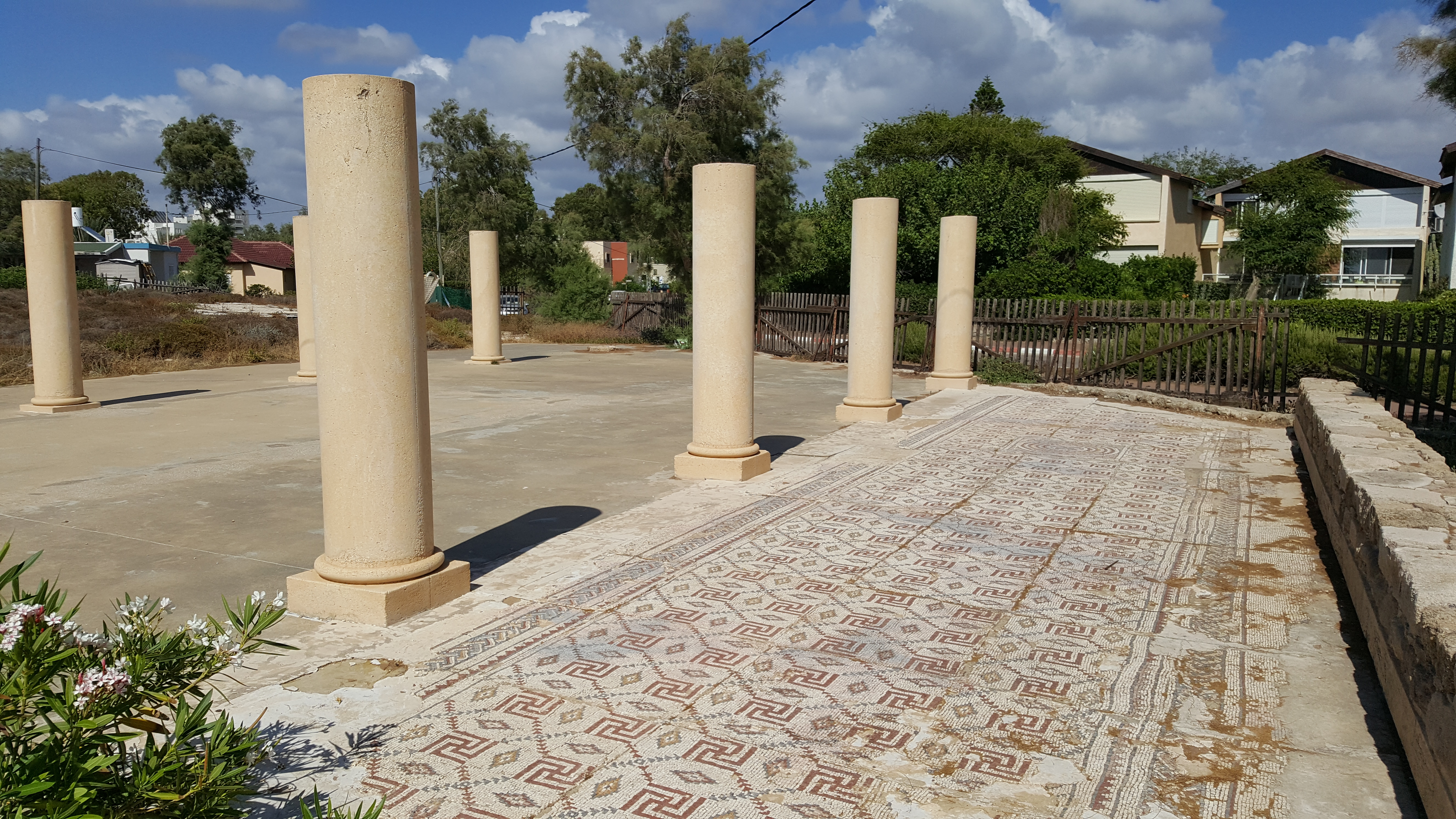
Byzantine remains

In 1955, remains of a Byzantine church were found along the beach path that leads from Acre to Tyre and was dated to the 4th century. The excavations were led by Moshe Prausnitz and the findings included Mosaic floors and walls as well as remains of an Artesian aquifer.

== Twin towns ==
Shavei Tzion has a friendship relationship with:

- Stuttgart, Germany

== Gallery ==
Tombstone of Acre Prison break fighters

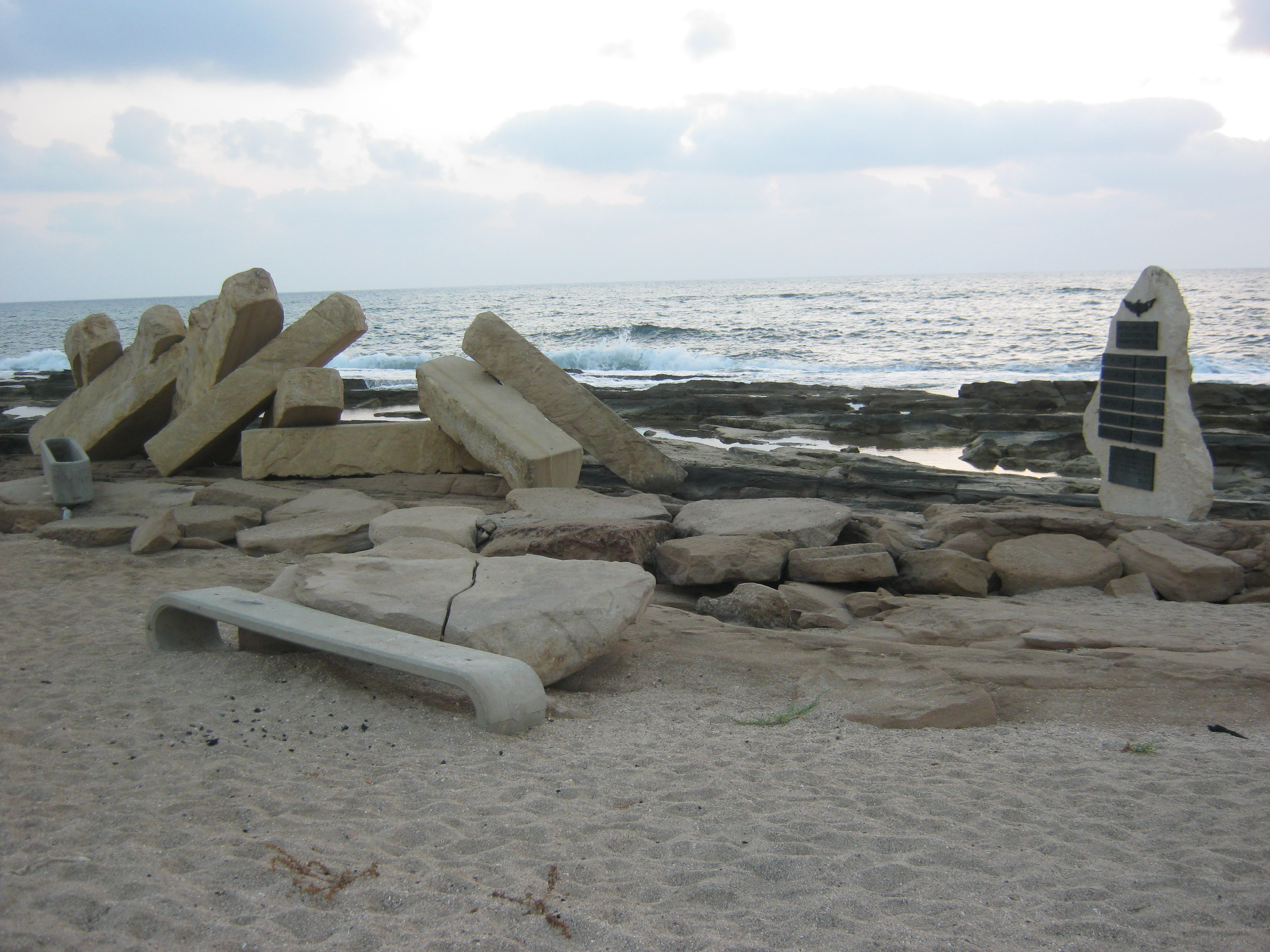
IDF Marine Commando Disaster Memorial

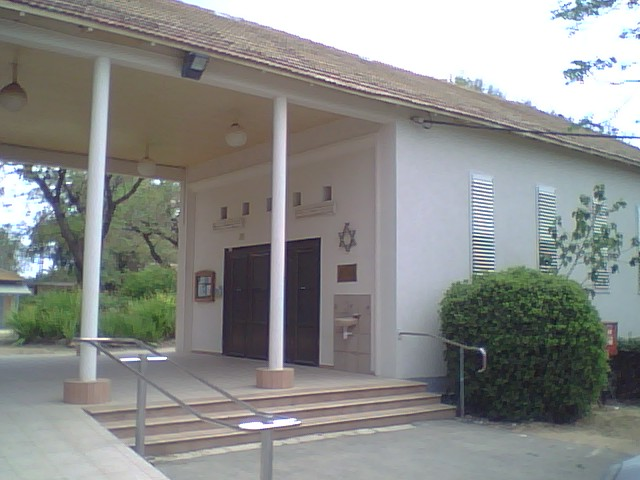
Synagogue

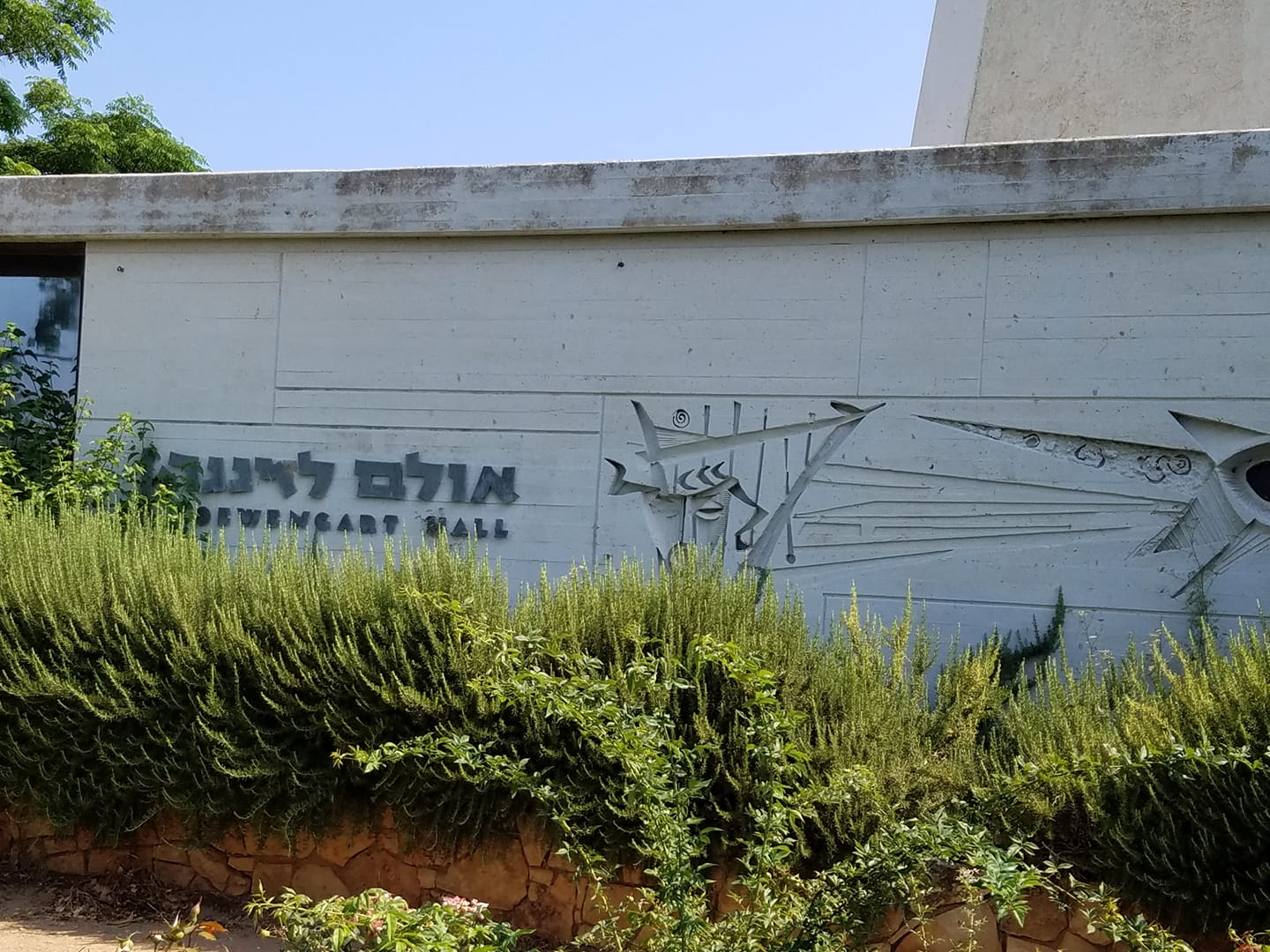
Beit Loewengart Community Hall

== Notable people ==
- Daliah Lavi
