= Amrit =

Archaeological site in Tartus District, Syria

- عمريت (Arabic)
- Amrith, Marathus, Marathos
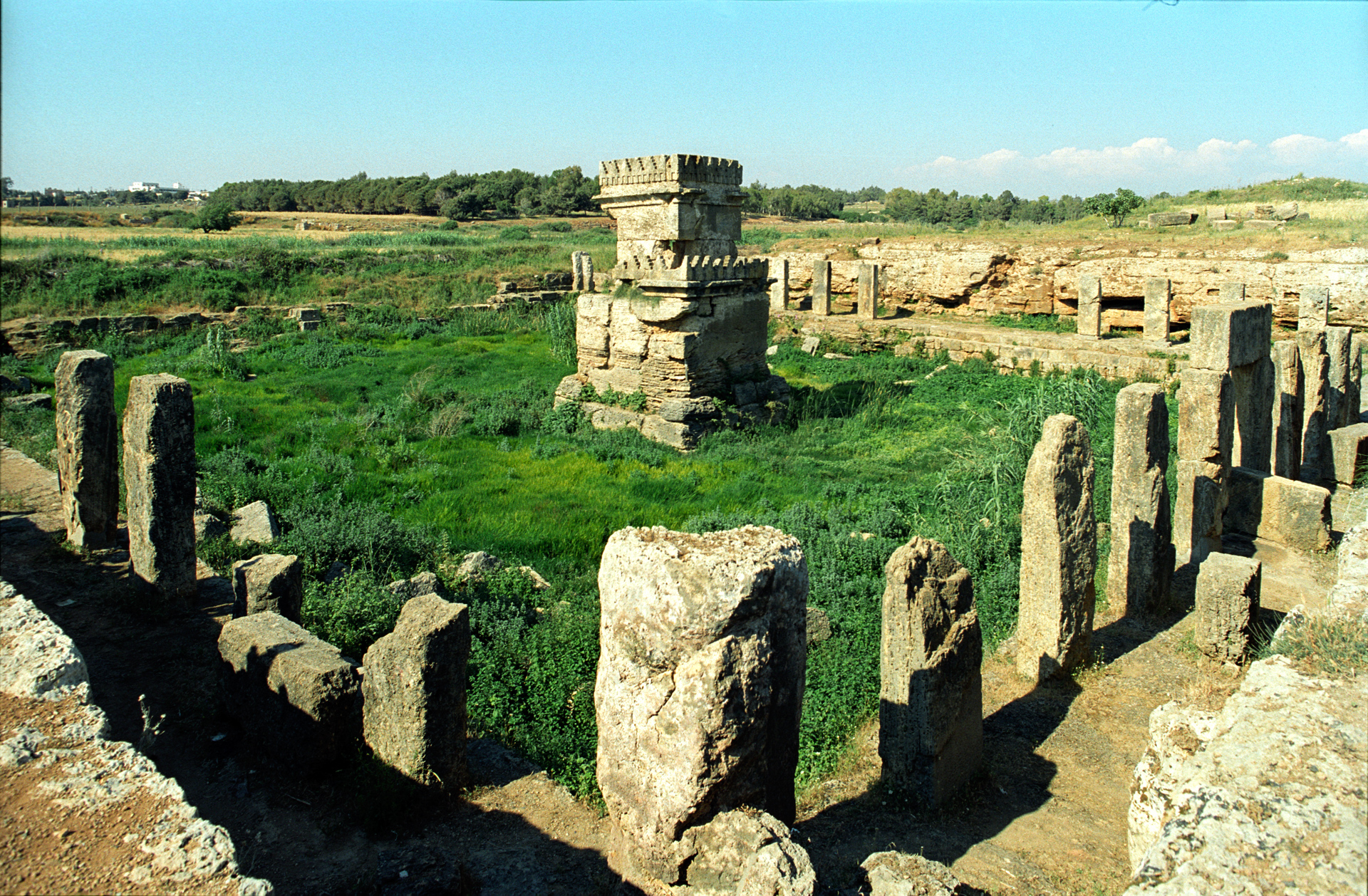
- The Temple of Amrit

- Location within Syria
- 34.8388°N 35.9071°E
- Type: Settlement
- Periods: Phoenician (Persian, Hellenistic)
- Location: 6 km (3.7 mi) from Tartus, Syria
- Region: Phoenicia

History
- Built: Third millennium BC
- Abandoned: c. 148 BC

Site notes
- Excavation dates: 1954
- Archaeologists: Maurice Dunand
- Condition: Ruins
- Management: Directorate-General of Antiquities and Museums
- Public access: Yes

Amrit (Arabic: عمريت) is a small village near Tartus, in south-western Syria. It lies on the site of the ancient Marathus (Ancient Greek: Μάραθος, Marathos), a Phoenician port located near present-day Tartus in Syria. Founded in the third millennium BC, Marat (Phoenician: 𐤌𐤓𐤕, mrt) was the northernmost important city of ancient Phoenicia, with relations to nearby Arwad. During the 2nd century BC, Amrit was defeated and its site largely abandoned, leaving its ruins well preserved and without extensive remodeling by later generations.

== History ==
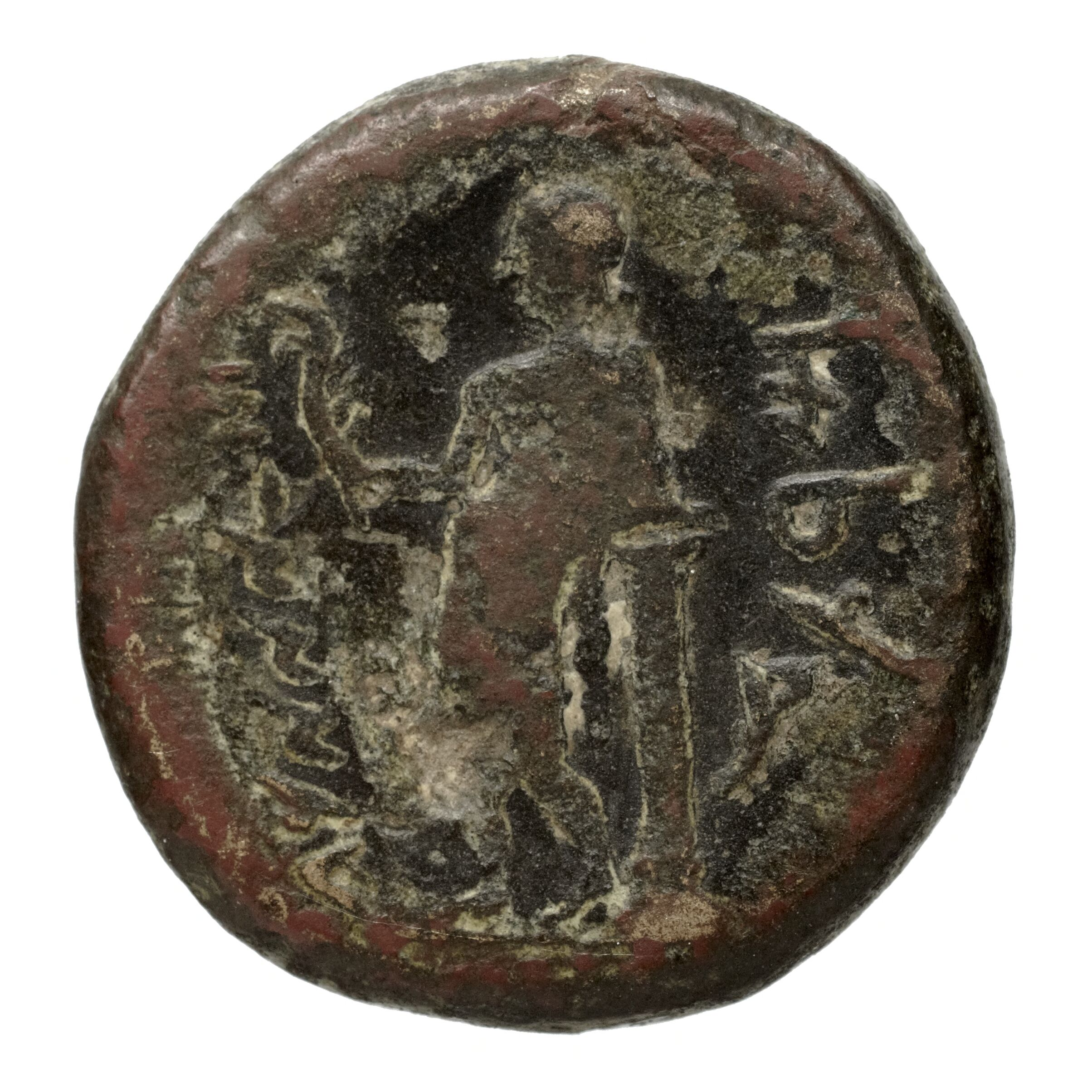
A coin of Marathus with the Phoenician name of the city, MRT

The ancient city lied on the Mediterranean coast around 6 km (3.7 mi) south of modern-day Tartus. Two rivers cross the city: Nahr Amrit, near the main temple, and Nahr al-Kuble near the secondary temple, a fact that might be linked to the importance of water in the religious traditions in Amrit. The city was probably founded by the Arvadites, and was considered one of the "daughters of Arwad" on the coastline. Marathus served as Arwad's continental base, although the port of Arwad in the mainland was Carne. It grew to be one of the wealthiest towns in the dominion of Arwad. The city surrendered, along with Arwad, to Alexander the Great in 333 BC. During Seleucid times the town, known as Marathus, was probably larger and more prosperous than Arwad. In 219 BC Marathus gained independence from Arwad, and was later sacked by forces from the latter city in 148 BC. Strabo described Marathus as ruins at his time.

== Excavation ==
Excavations of the site principally began in 1860 by Ernest Renan. Excavations were again carried out in 1954 by French archaeologist Maurice Dunand. Ceramics found at Amrit indicated the site had been inhabited as early as the third millennium BC. Excavations also uncovered the town's ancient harbor, and a U-shaped stadium that dates back to the 4th and 3rd centuries BC and measures around 230 m (750 ft) in length.

=== Temples ===
Amrit contained a Phoenician temple, commonly referred to the "ma'abed," dedicated to the god Melqart of Tyre and Eshmun. The colonnaded temple, excavated between 1955 and 1957, consists of a large court cut out of rock measuring 47 × 49 m (154 × 161 ft) and over 3 m (9.8 ft) deep, surrounded by a covered portico. In the center of the court a well-preserved cube-shaped cella stands.

A second temple, described by visitors to the site in 1743 and 1860 and thought to have disappeared, was later discovered by the Syrian archaeological mission near the Nahr al-Kuble spring.

=== Stadium ===
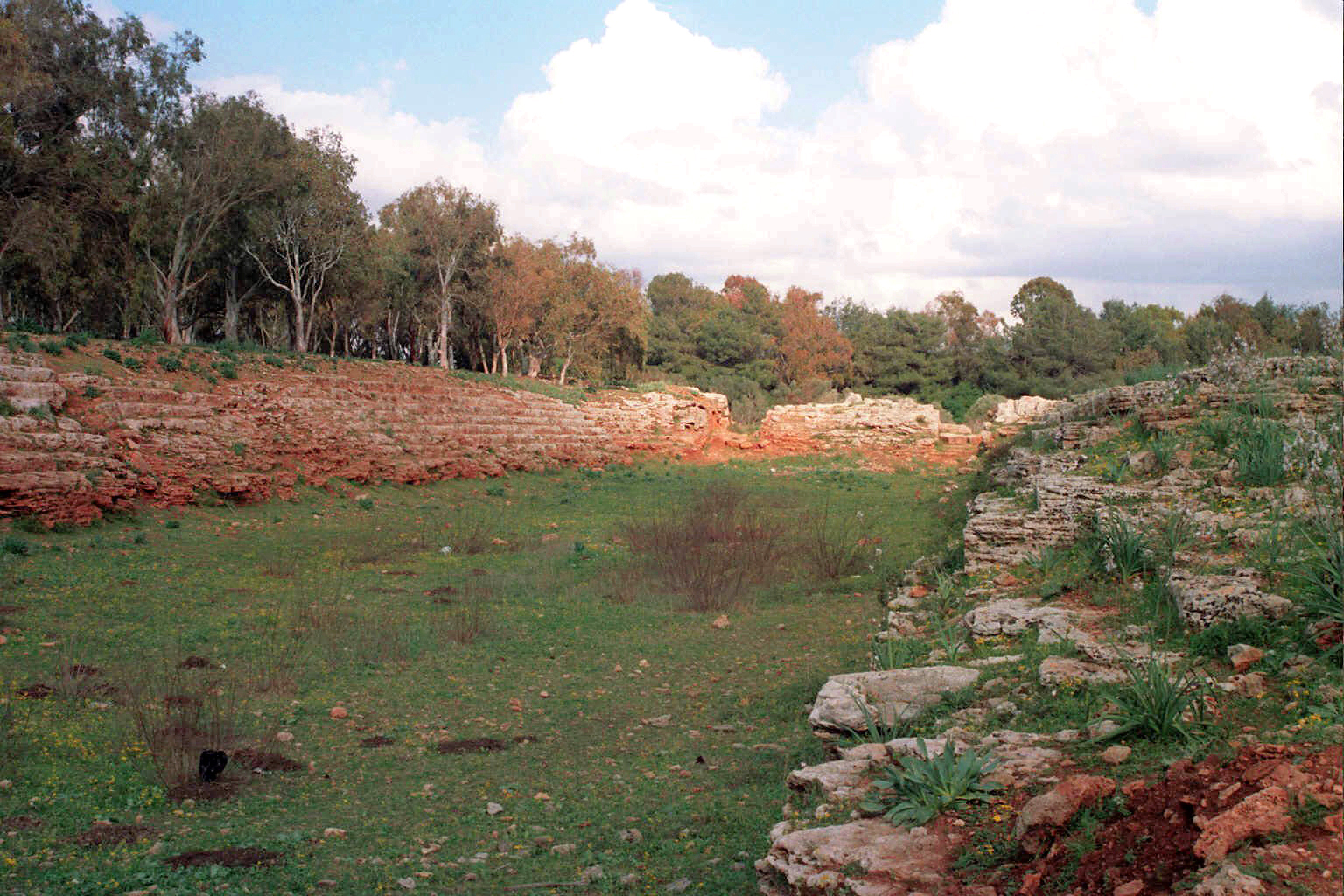
The Hellenistic-era Stadium north of Amrit

About 200 m (660 ft) northeast of the main temples of ancient Marathos and 180 m (590 ft) north of the Amrit Tell are the remains of a rock-carved Hellenistic-era Phoenician stadium built in the late 4th or early 3rd centuries BC. It is separated from the other two archaeological sites by the Nahr al-Amrit and a site called by the locals al-Meqla '(the quarry'). The Stadium of Amrit was first described in 1745 by Richard Pococke in Part 2 of his book, A Description of the East, and Some Other Countries, as the site where an ancient Circus was held. Ernest Renan examined it in 1860 and discussed it in his book Mission de Phénicie, making the conclusion that the complex was not Roman in its entirety and that the stadium was undoubtedly Phoenician. The stadium is about 225 to 230 meters long and 30 to 40 meters wide, it has similar dimensions to the stadium of Olympia in Greece (213 × 31/32 meters). Seven rows of seats have been partially preserved. The stadium was open to the west and had two entrances on the east side between seats. In addition, there was a tunnel to the interior. The stadium is located approximately at a right angle to the main temple of Amrit, the Maabed. The temples to the north and west have open sides or which the stadium forms a common intersection. It is believed that the Amrit stadium was the location for sacred competitions where anointing and funeral games took place.

=== Necropolis ===
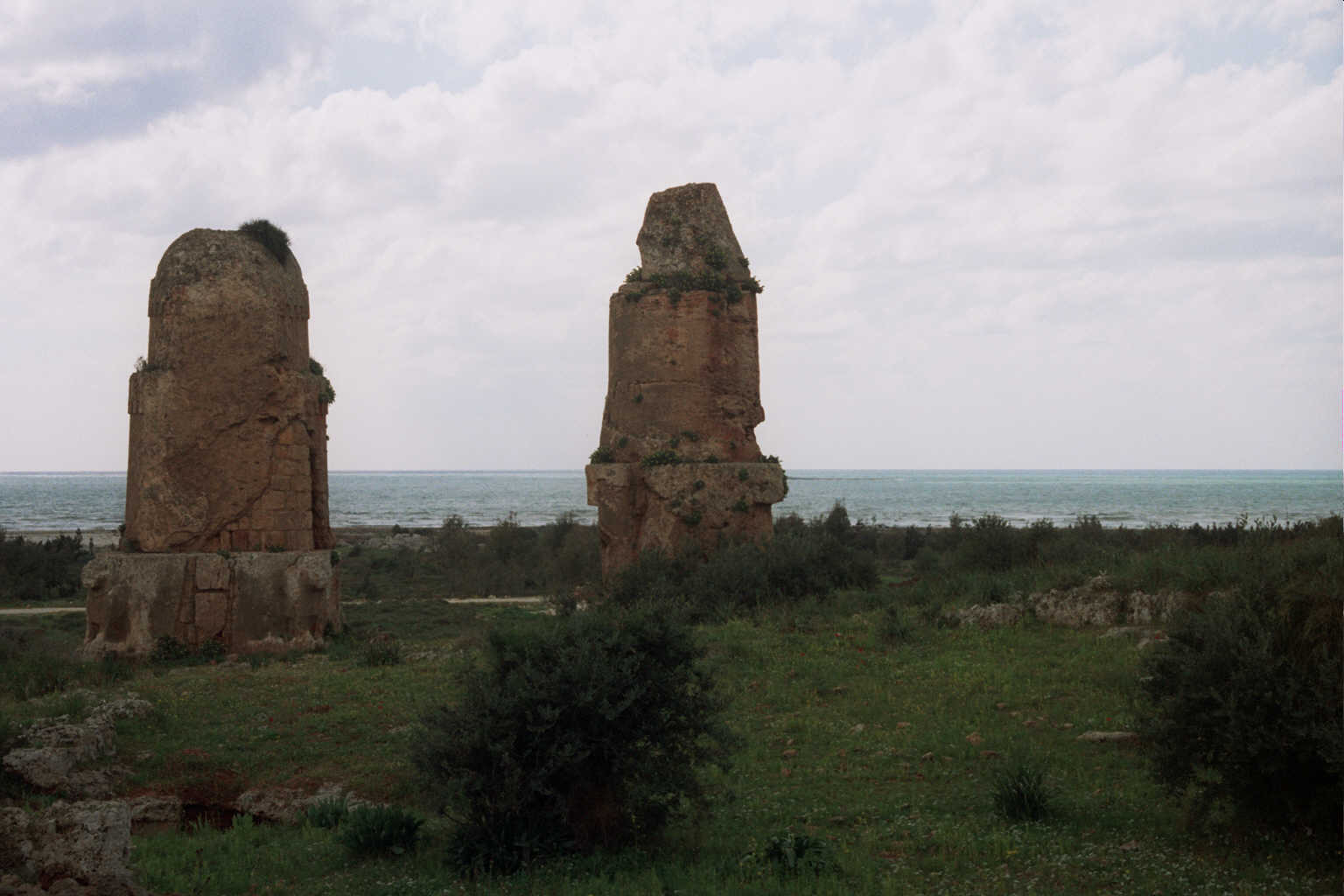
Burial towers at Amrit called "al Maghazil" or The Spindles

The Necropolis in the south of Amrit consists of underground burial chambers and two distinguishing burial towers called by the locals "al Maghazil" or The Spindles that stand up to 7.5 m (25 ft) high. The larger tower is composed of a square stone base with a slightly upward tapering cylindrical block with a base diameter of 3.7 m (12 ft), rising to a pyramid as a top termination, which is badly damaged. The second is approximately 12 meters southeast and is not quite 7 m (23 ft) tall. At its base are three cylindrical parts whose diameters decrease and terminate in a dome. At the lower cylinder, to the corners of the square base plates, four lions decorate the building, which may not have been completed. Excavations of the burial chambers east of the towers has uncovered finds dated back as far as the 5th century BC. Plain limestone and clay sarcophagus were found arranged in cassette-like formation within the chambers. Other tombs are located south of the Nahr al-Qubli, the "al-Burǧ Bazzāq" or Worm tower, a phenomenal structure that was originally 19.50 meters high and the Hypogeum "Ḥaǧar al-Ḥublā" with three burial chambers, which were still used in Roman times.

== Conservation ==
Amrit was included on the 2004 and 2006 World Monuments Fund watch lists of endangered archaeological sites. The Fund called attention to the site's rapid deterioration due to vandalism and encroaching development. In 2006 a three-day workshop was organized with participation from the UNESCO, Directorate-General of Antiquities and Museums of Syria and local administrators responsible for the sites of Amrit, Tartus and Arwad.

== Sources ==
- Head, Barclay; et al. (1911), "Phoenicia", Historia Numorum (2nd ed.), Oxford: Clarendon Press, pp. 788–801.
- Akkermans, Peter; Schwartz, Glenn (2003). The archaeology of Syria: from complex hunter-gatherers to early urban societies (c. 16,000-300 BC). Cambridge University Press. p. 391. ISBN 978-0-521-79666-8.
