= La Fonteta Phoenician Port =

Coordinates: 38.1084°N 0.6497°W

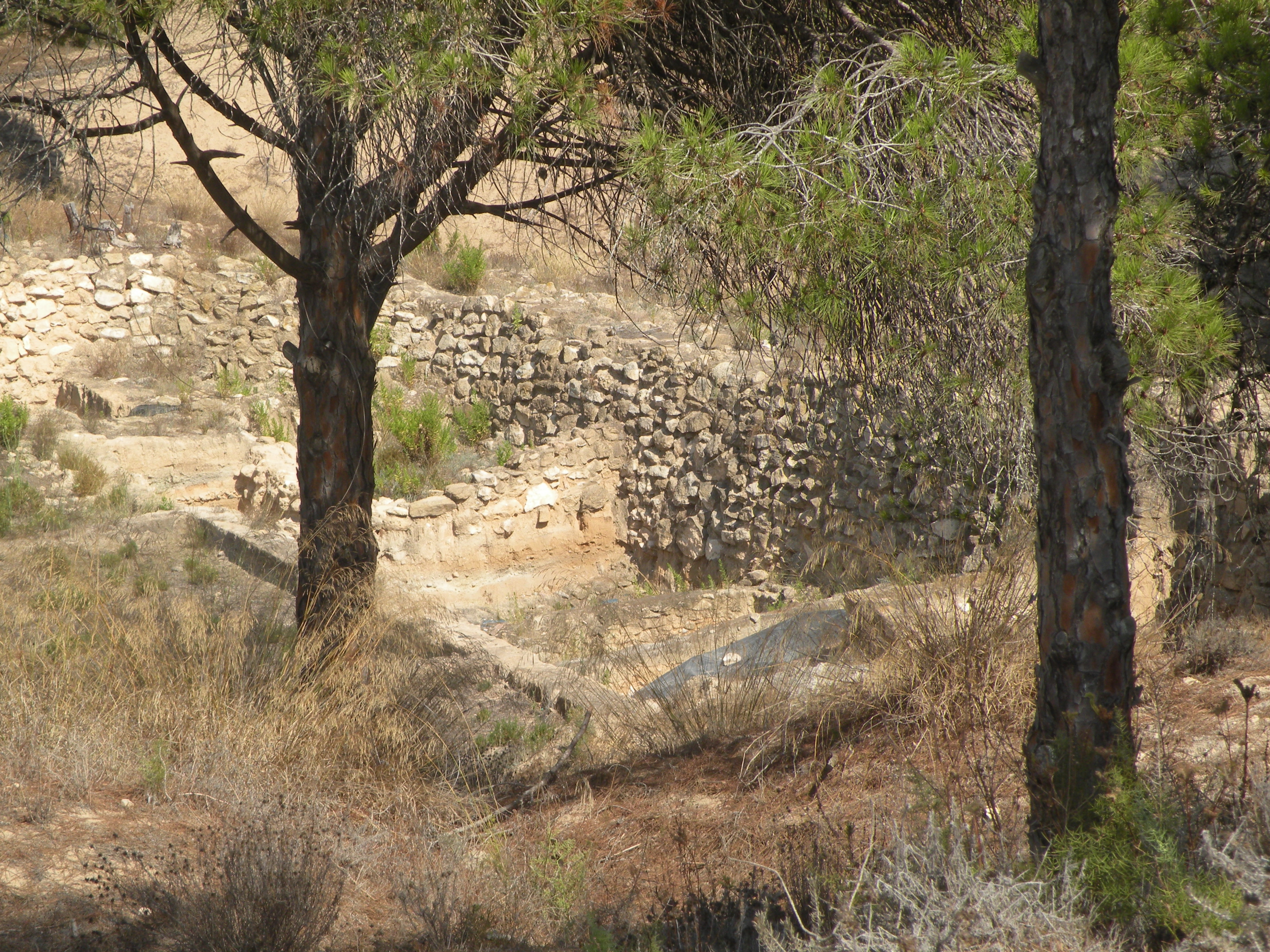
La Fonteta (Guardamar).

La Fonteta is an ancient Phoenician port city that was located in what is now the town of Guardamar del Segura, Alicante, Spain.

La Fonteta was a Phoenician port situated on the right bank of the mouth of the Segura River that existed from the 8th century to the 6th century BC; excavations have exposed remains of a settlement whose dimensions suggest an urban area of perhaps eight hectares, making it one of the largest and best preserved Phoenician cities in the western Mediterranean. From its founding, the port city of La Fonteta had access to an environment that included a sanctuary located at Guardamar, which likely attracted a cult of Astarte, protector goddess of sailors, at a point of land on the coast crucial to marine navigation. The archaeological record, with preservation favored by the sand dunes at Guardamar del Segura that buried the city, indicates that La Fonteta was one of the most important Phoenician cities of the 7th and 8th centuries BC.

Bronze, ivory, and glass objects found in strata dating to the Atlantic Bronze Age at Peña Negra in the nearby Serra de Crevillent show trade in the area with the Phoenicians beginning as early as the 9th century and increasing in the 8th century B.C. The Atlantic-style metallurgical production at Peña Negra, which is also close to the mouth of the Segura River, likely attracted peoples from the eastern Mediterranean who would benefit from this enterprise. In 1983 an archaeological expedition led by Alfredo González Prats identified Peña Negra as the Herna mentioned in the Ora Maritima, a flourishing mercantile center where several trade routes converged.

Archaeological work on a section of wall has revealed 60 m (200 ft) of defensive fortifications. The wall, built from medium-sized stones of soft sandstone and calcarenite limestone, was between 4 and 5 m (13–16 ft), and may have been over 7 metres (23 ft) wide at its base. An advanced architectural method was employed to construct it, with buttresses hígher than the brick being placed at regular points to isolate sections of the wall and prevent movement, such as that caused by an earthquake, from being transmitted along its entire length and making it unstable. Among the material culture found at La Fonteta is a large repertoire of Phoenician typological pottery: amphorae, plates, decorated cups, and a variety of red slipware and burnished pottery including rimmed plates, bowls, oenochoes, lamps, and tripods. Archaic Greek pottery, and ritual objects such as decorated ostrich eggs, ivory, and scarabs, etc., appear as well.
