= Carne, Phoenicia =

Ancient Phoenician city

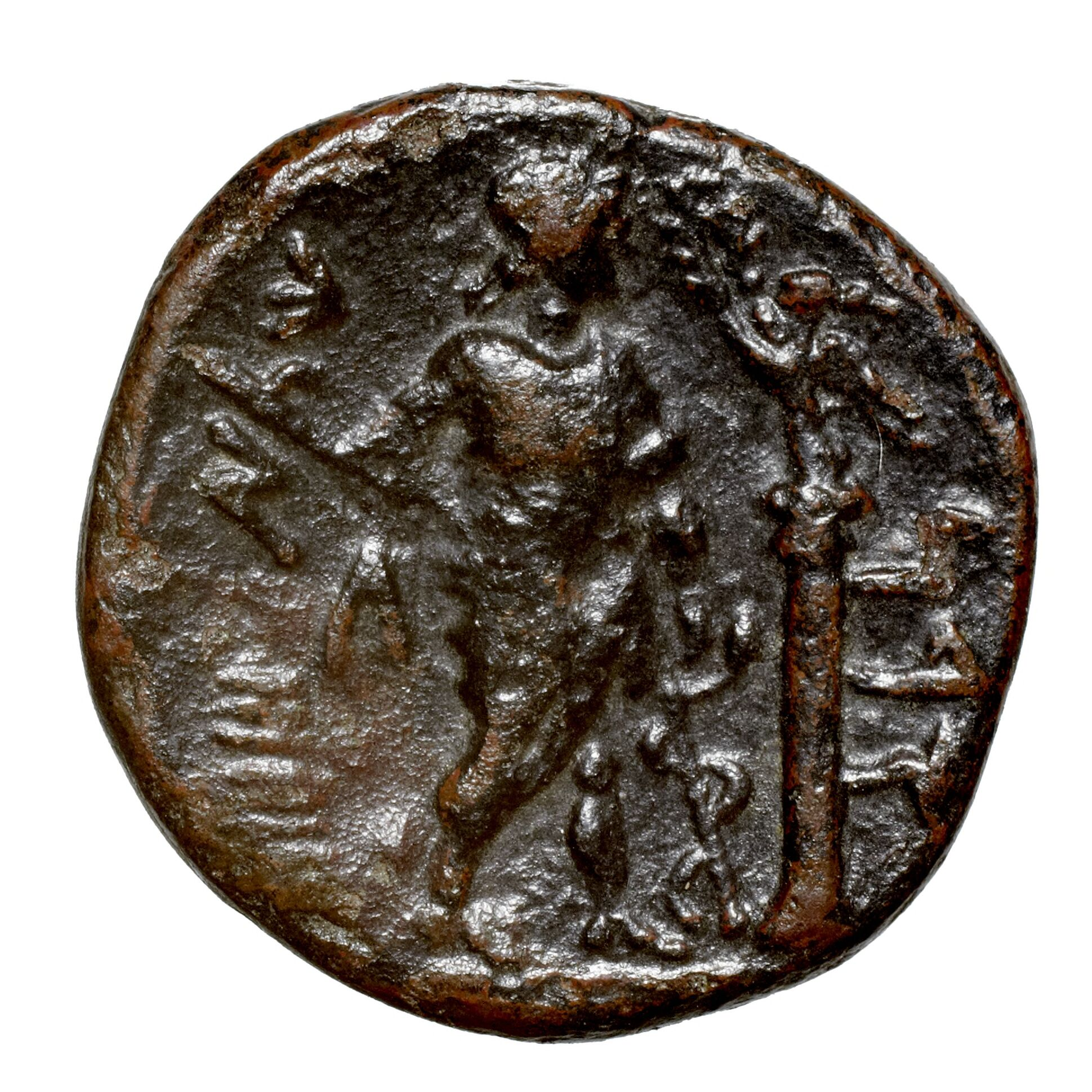
A coin of Carne: the Phoenician name 𐤒𐤓𐤍 on the right, the Phoenician date on the left

Carne (Phoenician: 𐤒𐤓𐤍, Greek: Κάρνη) or Carnos (Greek: Κάρνος) was an ancient Phoenician city opposite to the island-city Arados, north of Tartus. Carne (and not Marath) was the port of Arados on the mainland, the only port city of its dependencies.

Nothing is known of the history of the city as distinct from that of Aradian Paralia, which included also Tartus, Marath, Enydra, Balanaea and Paltus. Lycophron uses the term "Καρνῖται κύνες" (Carnite hounds) to refer Phoenician merchants. Strabo mentions it as one of the Aradian coast cities, in which its seaboard harbour is found. Pliny the Elder and Stephanus of Byzantium mention it as a city in northern Phoenicia.

Carne had a Mint, in which its Phoenician name and a date in Phoenician numerals, presumably that of Arados, were minted on its coins. Some of the coins also show the Greek letters ΚΑΡ with the Alpha and the Rho joined together. Some of them contain a palm, a common symbol of Phoenicia. The deities who stand out in their appearance on the city's coins are Zeus, Tyche and Eshmun-Asclepius (sometimes crowned by Nike). The types of the coins are mainly those of Arados, although the Eshmun-Asclepius type points to a special cult of the deity at Carne. The mint produced coins in three periods (all are BC): 226/225–221/220, 188/187–185/184, and 137/136, a year that saw especially a great revival of currency at Arados itself.

Nowadays, the city location is called Karnûn or Karnoun, with an -oun suffix typical for borrowed names from Greek even when they don't end with Greek suffix -ον (like Batroun, from Greek Βοτρύς).
