= Shikmona =

Ancient port near modern Haifa

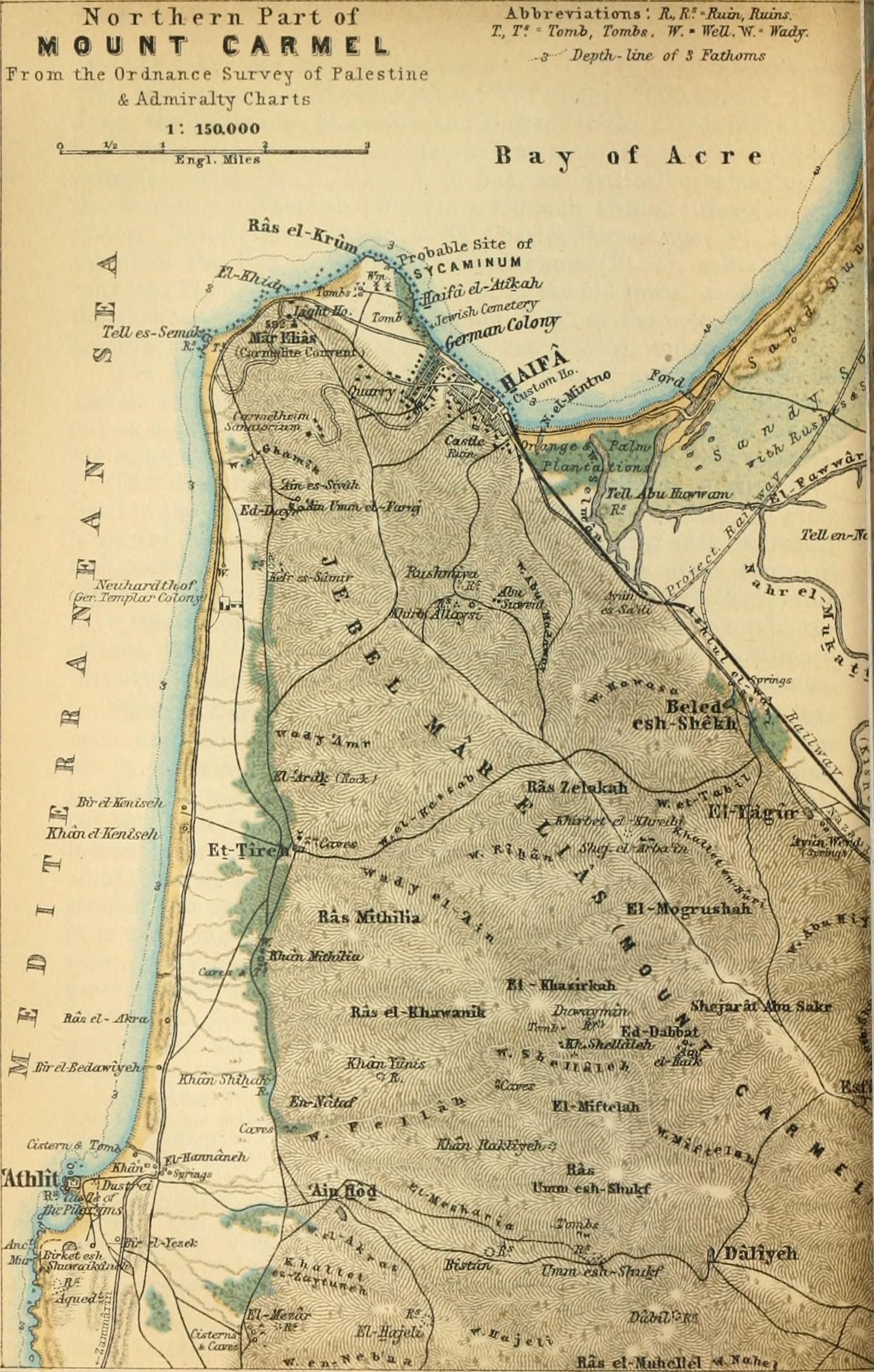
1906 map showing "Probable site of Sycaminum", just north of Haifa el-Atika

Shikmona was an ancient port town near modern Haifa, first mentioned by Josephus. It may be named for the Sycamine tree.

== History ==
In the Periplus of Pseudo-Scylax it is mentioned the Sykaminon (Συκάμινον) as a city of the Tyrians, and also that there was a river of the same name. Stephanus of Byzantium called it Sykaminon (Συκαμίνων) and called it a city of the Phoenicians. Josephus in his Antiquities mentions Sycamine as being a place where ships could be brought to harbor, and where Ptolemy Lathyrus, during an incursion in the country, had brought his army ashore. Strabo mentions the site (Sycaminopolis, Συκαμίνων πόλις) as being no more than a ruin in his own day. The Mishnah (Demai 1:1), compiled in 189 CE, mentions the region of Shikmona as being renowned for its cultivated variety of jujubes. The Bordeaux pilgrim in 333 CE passed through Sycaminon while traveling through the Holy Land.

In Edward Robinson's 1856 Later Biblical Researches in Palestine, he wrote:

Haifa... is the Sycaminum of Greek and Roman writers. This is expressly affirmed by both Jerome and Eusebius, who lived in the country; the latter near by at Cæsarea; and the authority of these fathers, in such a case, is too great to be called in question. It is several times spoken of in the Talmudic writings under both names. The traveller Sæwulf mentions it; as also R. Benjamin and R. Parchi. In A. D. 1100, Tancred besieged it, and took it by storm. Arabian writers also often speak of it. In the times of the crusades, it was sometimes mistaken for the ancient Porphyreon; which, however, as we have seen, was at Neby Yûnas between Sidon and Beirût.

== Bibliography ==
- Conder, Claude R. (1877). "Sycaminon, Hepha, Porphyreon, and Chilzon". Palestine Exploration Quarterly. 9 (4): 187–190. doi:10.1179/peq.1877.9.4.187. ISSN 0031-0328.
