= Yehiam =

Yehiam: יְחִיעָם (Hebrew)
- Yehi'am dining hall

- Location within Northwest Israel Location within Israel
- Coordinates: 32°59′45″N 35°13′14″E
- Country: Israel
- District: Northern
- Subdistrict: Acre
- Council: Mateh Asher
- Affiliation: Kibbutz Movement
- Founded: 1946
- Founder: Hashomer Hatzair Members; Hungarian Holocaust Survivors
- Population (2024): 850
- Website: www.yechiam.org.il

Yehiam (Hebrew: יְחִיעָם) is a kibbutz in northern Israel. Located at the western Upper Galilee, eight miles east of the coastal town of Nahariya and 14 miles south-east of the border with Lebanon it falls under the jurisdiction of Mateh Asher Regional Council. In 2024 it had a population of 850. It is located around 365 meters above sea level.

Yehiam is situated next to the ruins of the Ottoman-era castle of Jiddin, built on top of the 13th-century Crusader castle of Judin.

== History ==
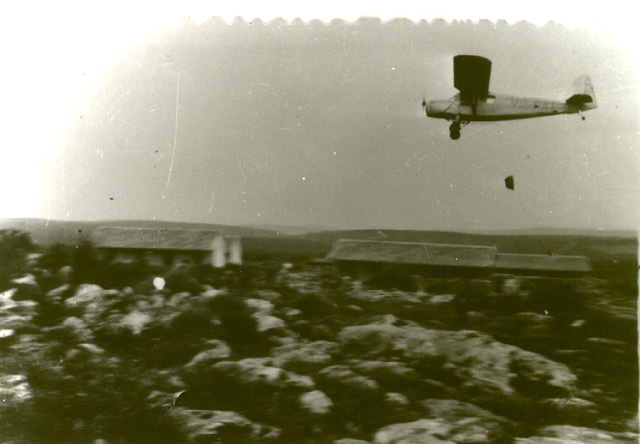
Supplies airlifted to Yehi'am, 1948

Yehiam was founded by a group of the socialist Zionist Hashomer Hatzair youth movement—Holocaust survivors from Hungary and members from Yishuv—who named themselves Kibbutz HaSela (lit. The Rock), whereas "kibbutz" is still understood here as a wandering "collective", not as a settlement. For a while the HaSela collective lived in tents in the area of Kiryat Haim, looking for an appropriate place to settle. Eventually, on 26 November 1946, Kibbutz Yehiam was established at the site of the medieval castle, with only the men taking residence, at first within the castle and then in tents at its foot, while the women, children and some men remained at Kiryat Haim, where they worked in order to support the group up at the castle. According to one guidebook, there were 50 founding members, who transformed the castle ruins into a military training camp. The UN Partition resolution came almost exactly one year later, on 29 November 1947, placing the kibbutz within the envisaged Arab state, rather than the Jewish one. The new name, Yehiam, was adopted in honour of Yehiam Weitz, son of Jewish Agency official Joseph Weitz, who had been killed not far away, near the Arab village of al-Kabri, in the "Night of the Bridges", a Palmach operation which took place on 16–17 June 1946. The decision to establish the new kibbutz was taken after consultations with Joseph Weitz.

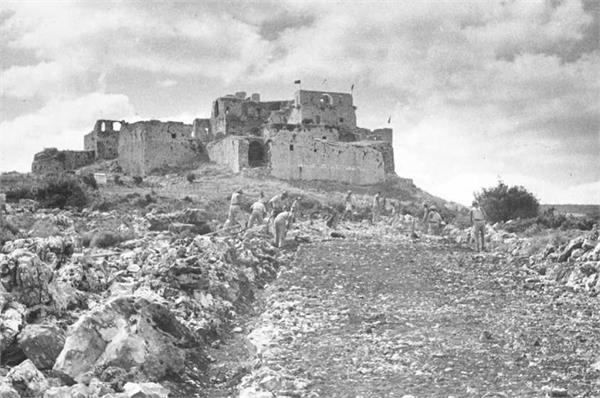
Khirbat Jiddin 1947

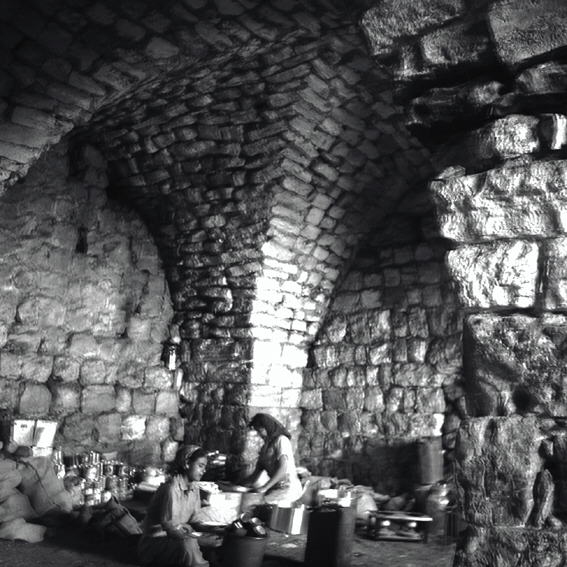
Interior of castle used as kitchen 1946

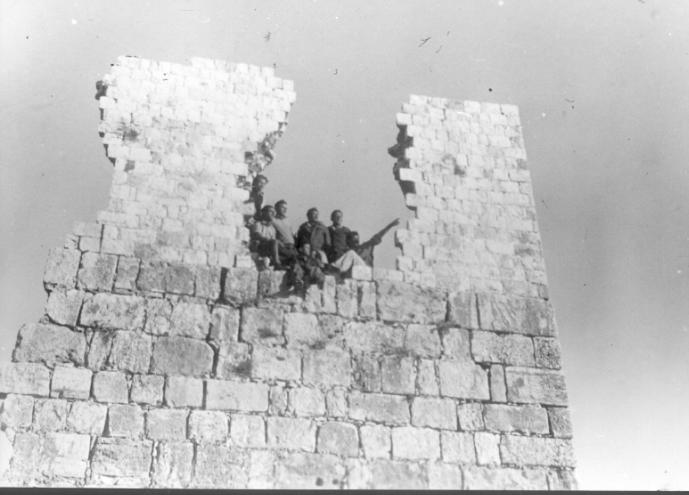
Members of Kibbutz Yehiam, December 1946

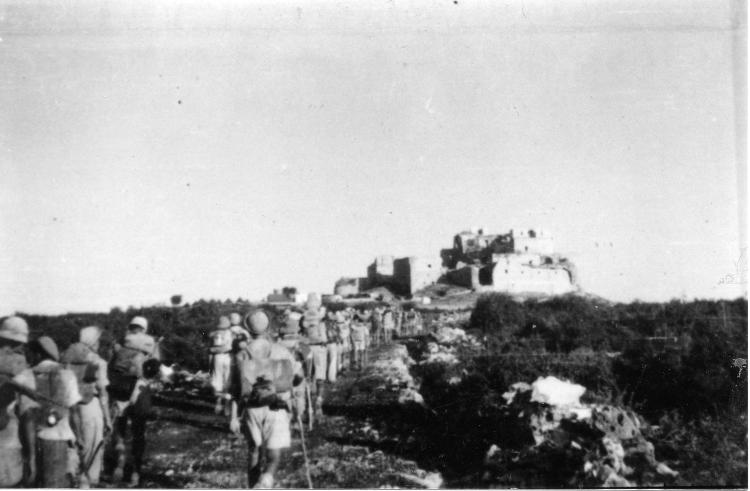
Palmach, C Company, on training expedition approach Yehiam Fortress. No date

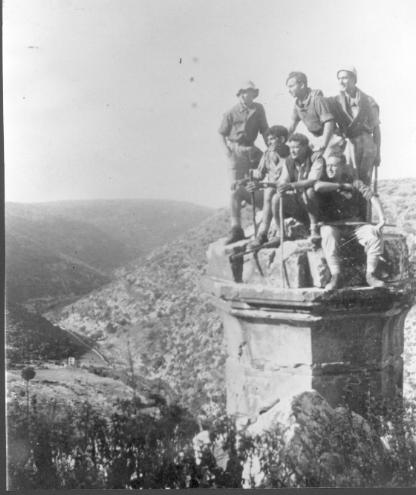
Members of the Palmach at Kibbutz Yehiam in 1948

The initial attempt to use the surviving rooms of the castle almost ended in disaster, as the ticks left behind by the herds of goats sheltered here by the local Bedouins during the winter months were carriers of disease, and after a month and a half 20 members had already fallen ill with fever. Injections of penicillin, the just recently introduced wonder drug, saved their lives. Signalling was the only means of communication with the comrades from Kiryat Haim and the rest of the world, but the lack of potable water was the main problem, as the pools they had built to collect rainwater did not provide drinkable water even after treatment.

The British mandatory authorities assisted in the kibbutz establishment, despite it being against official British policy.

On 20 January 1948, 200–300 troops of the Arab Liberation Army's Second Yarmuk Regiment based in Tarshiha attacked Yehi'am, armed with mortars, machine guns and rifles. The force surrounded the kibbutz from all sides and blocked all the access roads. A platoon of British soldiers exchanged fire with the Arab regiment, which withdrew and tried to attack again the following night but was repulsed by a reinforcement of Haganah fighters. photo

On 27 March 1948, a Haganah convoy was sent to bring supplies to the kibbutz which was besieged by Arab forces. The Yehiam convoy, consisting of five trucks and an armored car, was ambushed by 250 Arabs near al-Kabri. The incident was reported on 29 March in The Scotsman:

"The second ambush occurred at Kabri, near Naharia, seven miles north of Acre. Here the bodies of 42 Jews were found near five burnt out lorries. It is stated that in this action a column of six Jewish lorries were ambushed by 250 Arabs who were armed with rifles, two inch mortars, and light machine guns. The column, escorted by an armoured car, was attacked an hour before sunset on Saturday night. A British flying column was sent to relieve the Jews but failed to reach them, it is reported. British artillery then opened fire with 12-lb and 25-lb high-explosive shells, and the Arabs withdrew."

The founders of Kibbutz Yehi'am lived in tents among the ruins. A small kitchen provided meals with airlifted supplies. They were highly visible to the Arab troops stationed on the hills, who subjected the fortress to heavy fire. Communication with the outside world was through bonfires, flashlight signals and pigeon posts to Nahariya and Kiryat Haim. While defending themselves, Yehi'am members worked the land, growing vegetables, grapes and peaches.

During Operation Dekel the Israeli army conquered and forcibly evacuated the Bedouin village of Khirbat Jiddin on 10–11 July 1948. Several operations later, the entire Galilee was eventually taken by Jewish forces during Operation Hiram between 29 and 31 October 1948.

After the 1948 Arab–Israeli War, new houses were built, including the first children's house. Hashomer Hatzair groups joined from different parts of Israel, as well as Aliya of that same movement from Cuba, France, Uruguay, Argentina, Mexico, Colombia and Venezuela.

== Economy ==
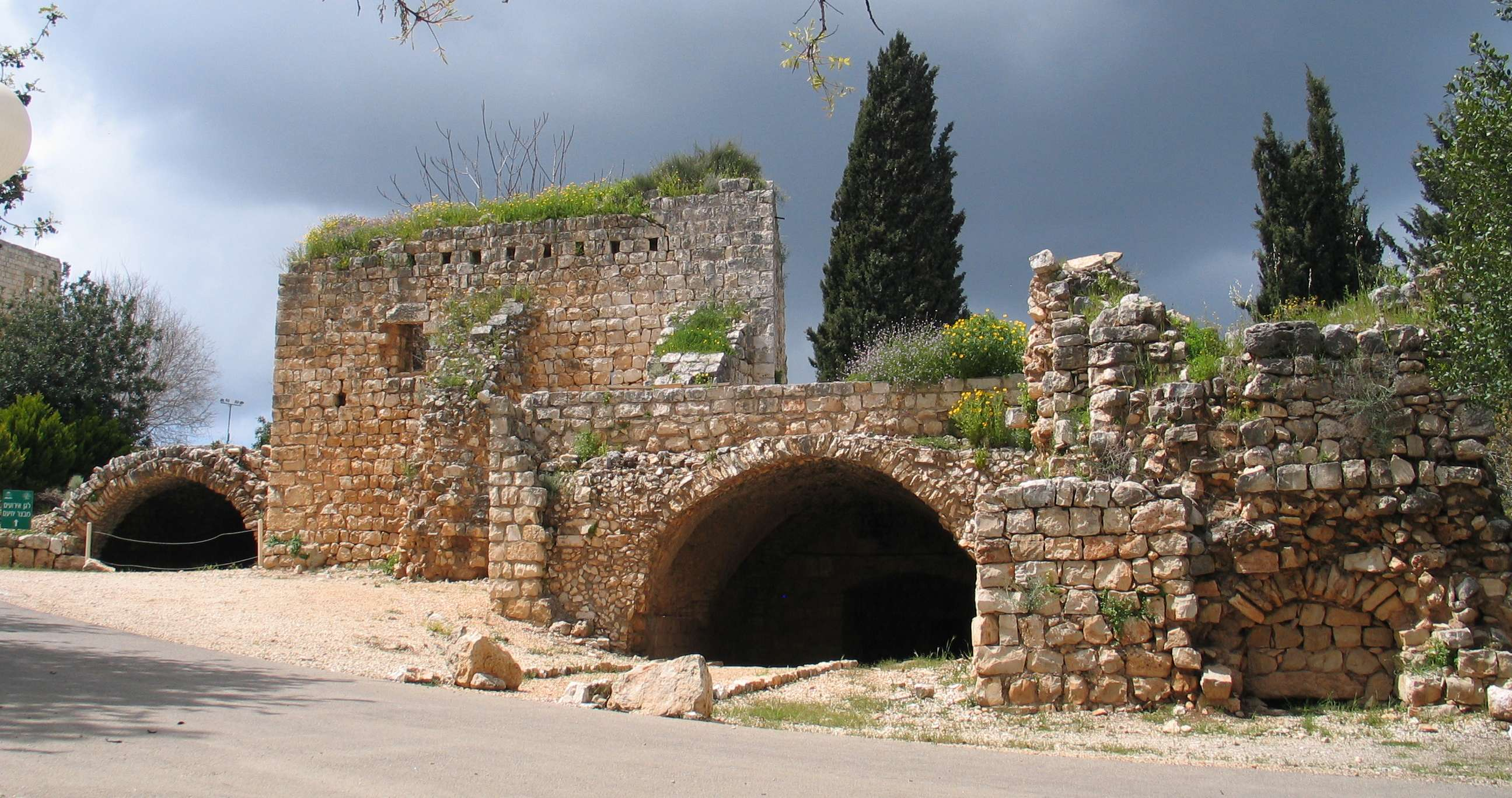
Remnants of the Crusader castle

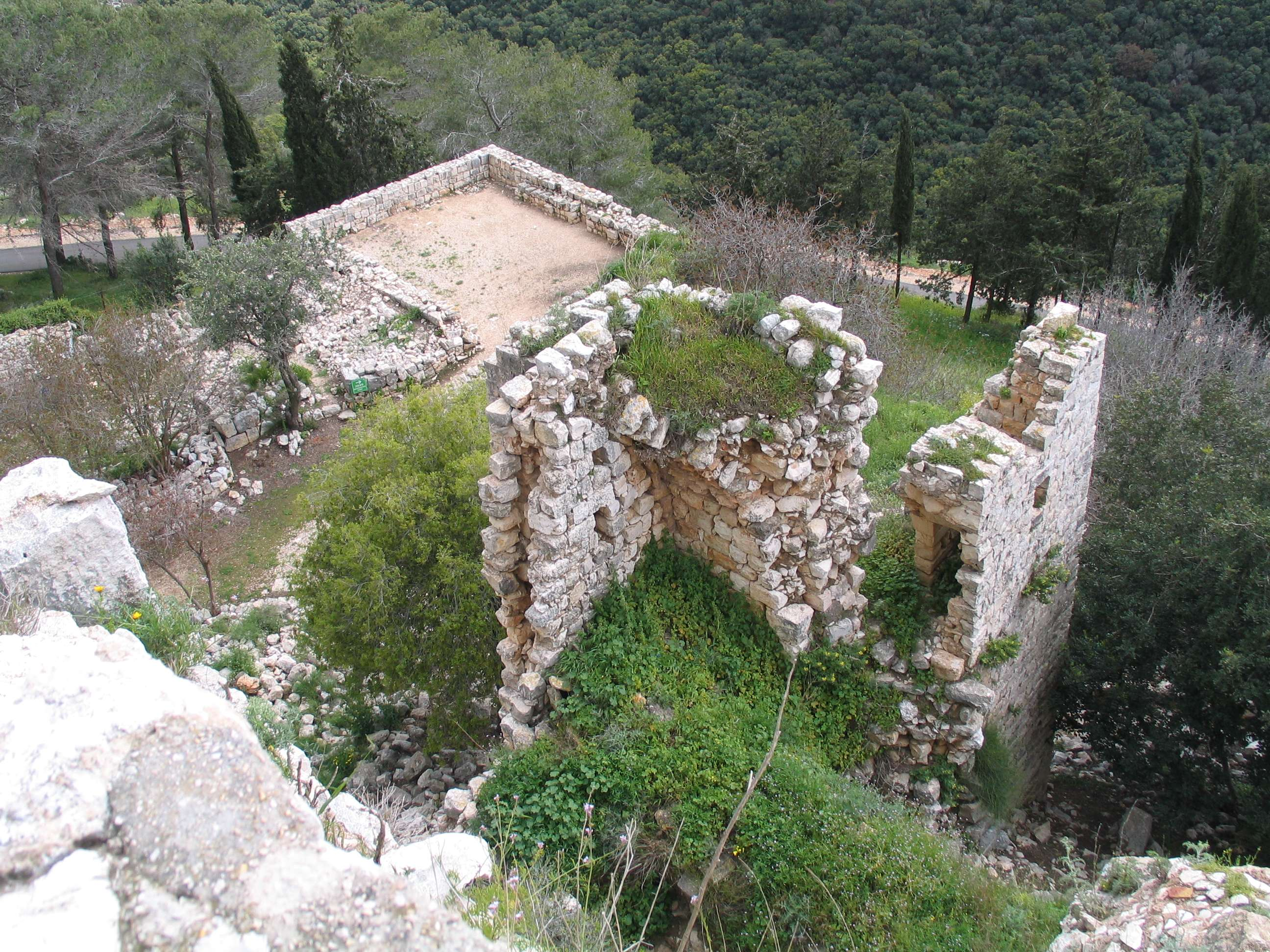
Yehi'am fortress

Kibbutz Yehiam was privatised in 2001, with a programme put in place in order to attract young families, some of them belonging to people who have grown up on the kibbutz and have moved out at some point.

A sweets factory was one of the first industries in Yehi'am. In addition, the kibbutz had a large variety of agriculture branches such as bananas, citrus, avocado, dairy farming, chicken coop, pigsty, fish farming, wheat, cotton and maize (corn), and a large tobacco crop. As for 2023, Yehi'am's agriculture is largely based on bananas, avocado, and chickens.

Yehi'am Fortress National Park features an Arab fortress built in the 18th century by Zahir al-Umar on and around the remains of a smaller castle dating back to the Crusader era, and which was occupied later on by Bedouin tribes when it was called Khirbat Jiddin.

In 1969, Yehi'am established Deli-Yehiam, a kosher meat factory specializing in beef and chicken cold cuts. In 2006, the company developed a new series of products including pastrami with pistachio, red peppers and olives, which was also marketed at retail chains and kosher delis in France. Its exports to Europe totaled $10 million a year.

In the early 1990s, Yehi'am built Teva BeYehiam, a 60-room Crusader-style guest house at the foot of the castle.

== Notable people ==
- Yael Neeman (born 1960), writer
- Yona Rozenkier (born 1981), filmmaker
- Neetzan Zimmerman (born 1981), blogger

== See also ==
- Yehi'am Fortress National Park
- Khirbat Jiddin
