= Jiddin =

Crusader fortress in the Upper Galilee

Jiddin خربة جدّين
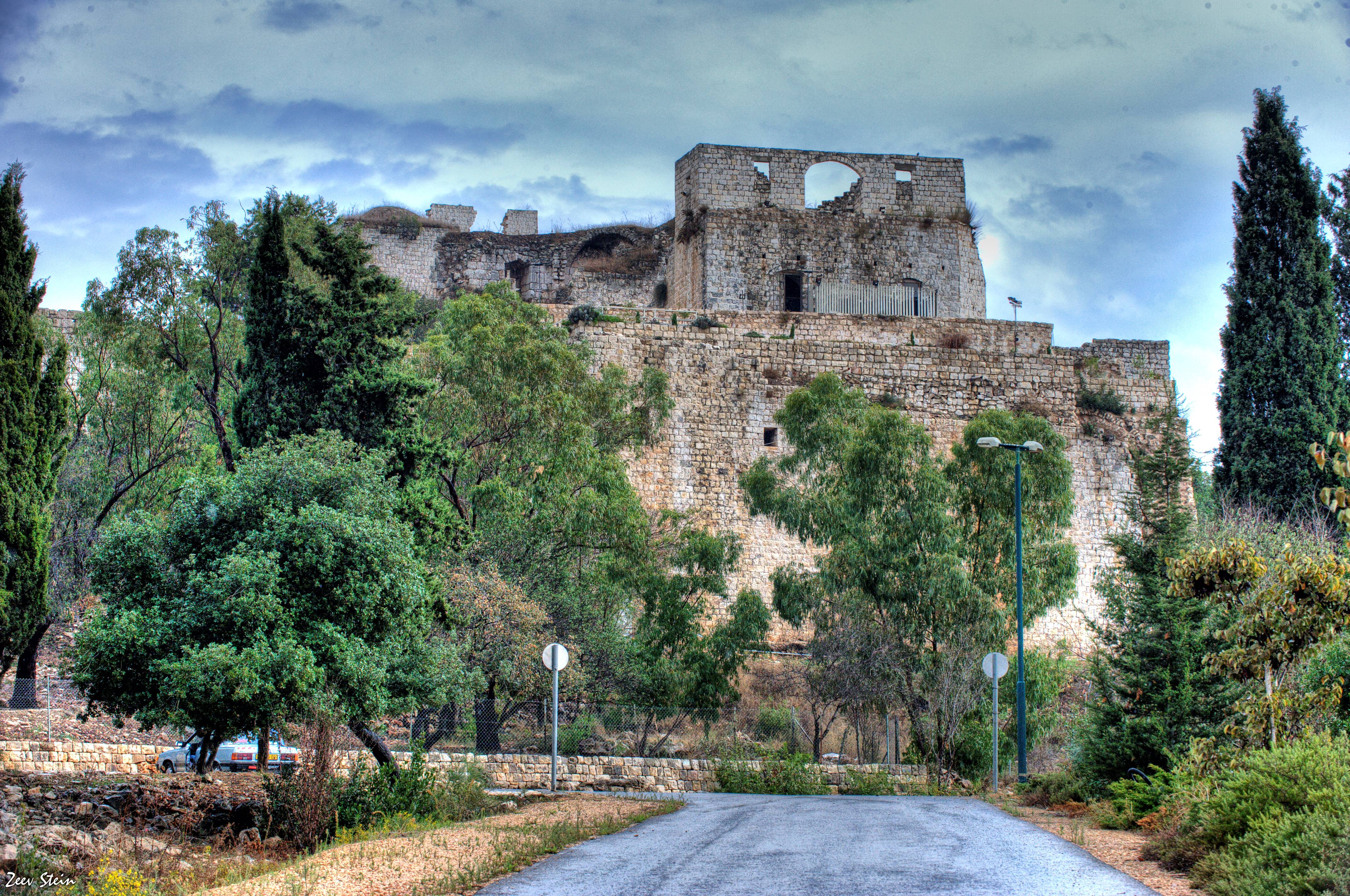
- Jiddin fortress from its main entry, 2009

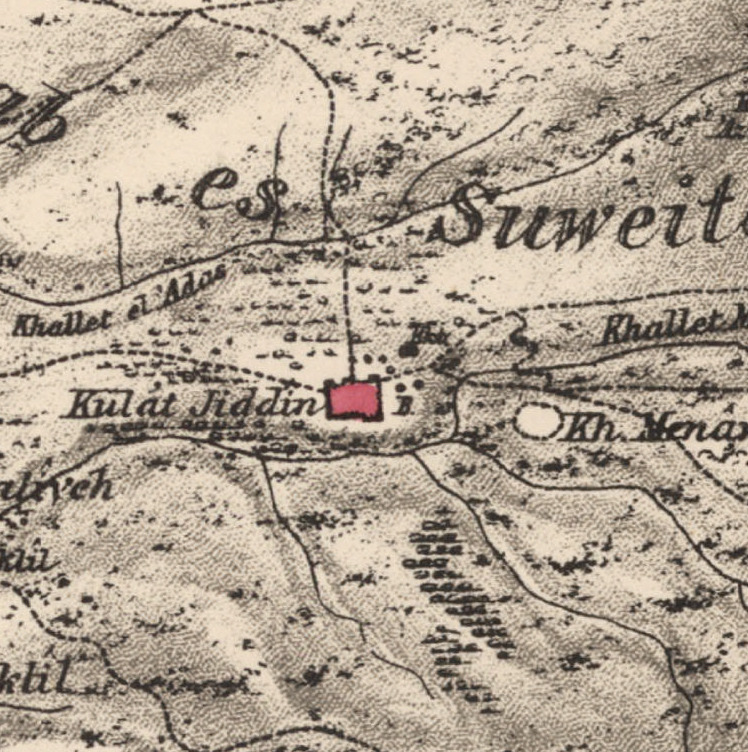
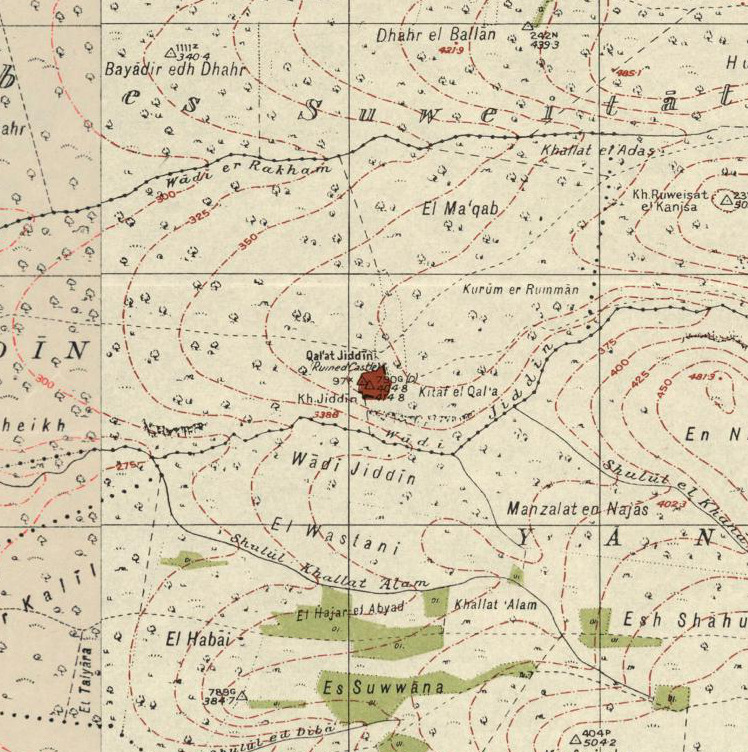
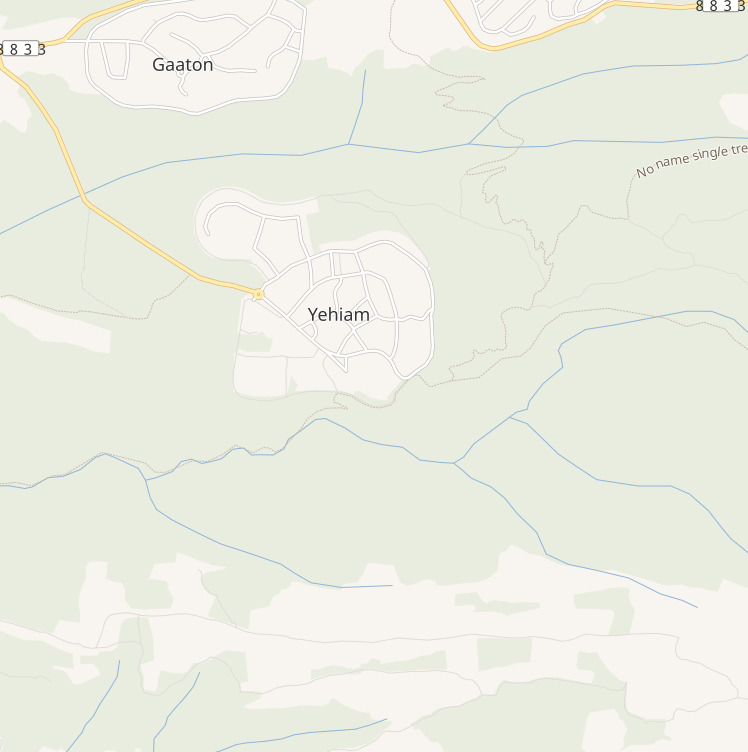
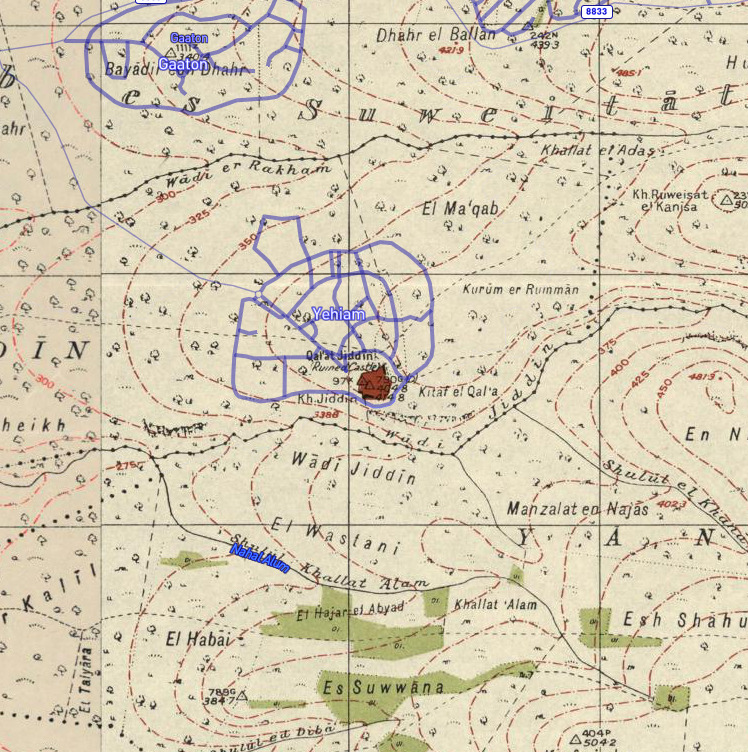
- 1870s map 1940s map modern map 1940s with modern overlay map A series of historical maps of the area around Jiddin (click the buttons)

- Location within Mandatory Palestine
- Coordinates: 32°59′40″N 35°13′19″E
- Palestine grid: 171/266
- Geopolitical entity: Mandatory Palestine
- Subdistrict: Acre

Area
  - Total: 7,587 dunams (7.587 km^{2}; 2.929 sq mi)
- Current Localities: Yehiam, Kiryat, and Ga'aton

Jiddin (Arabic: جدين), also known as the Jiddin Fortress (Arabic: قلعة جدين, romanized: Qalʾat Jiddīn) or Khirbet Jiddin (Arabic: خربة جدين, lit. 'ruins of Jiddin') is a partly ruined fortress in the western Upper Galilee 16 kilometers (9.9 mi) northeast of the port city of Acre.

The fortress was originally built on the site of a Byzantine-era settlement by the Crusaders' Teutonic Order in the 13th century when it formed part of the Acre-based Kingdom of Jerusalem. The castle, then called Judin, was destroyed by the Mamluk sultan Baybars after he conquered the nearby fortress of Montfort from the Crusaders in 1271. In the 18th century, Jiddin was rebuilt and enlarged into a stately headquarters by the Husayn sheikhs and Daher al-Umar, local strongmen and tax farmers. At the time, Jiddin acted as the effective center of the cotton-rich Sahil Akka (plain of Acre) subdistrict. After Daher was killed by the Ottomans in 1775, the new governor of Acre, Jazzar Pasha, destroyed the fortress. Its ruins, Khirbat Jiddin, were afterward used as shelter by Bedouin shepherds and their flocks.

Jiddin's lands were largely uncultivable and no population was listed in British Mandate (1920–1948) records. Over a third of its lands were purchased by the Jewish National Fund in the late 1930s and a kibbutz, Yehi'am, was founded near the fortress in 1946. Most of the lands remained under Arab ownership. In the 1948 Palestine war, Jewish forces commandeered Jiddin and repulsed the first major assault by the Arab Liberation Army in the country in January 1948. The area was captured in Operation Hiram in October 1948, becoming part of the state of Israel. In 1967, the site was declared the Yehi'am Fortress National Park.

The fortress consists of two wards, each enclosed by a curtain wall. The upper (inner) ward is largely of Crusader construction, and closely resembles the other Teutonic castle of Montfort, both inspired by the military architecture of the Rhineland. Within the inner ward are two towers, rising along the ridgeline, which were heightened in the Ottoman period. The lower (outer) ward was largely constructed during the 18th century and its enclosure wall includes two rounded towers and a bastion, which serves as the castle's main entry. A paved extension of the fortress from this period added a mosque and bathhouse above and a groin-vaulted hall underneath, a clustering characteristic of Islamic architecture. A few houses were built within the fortress in the 19th century.

== Geography ==
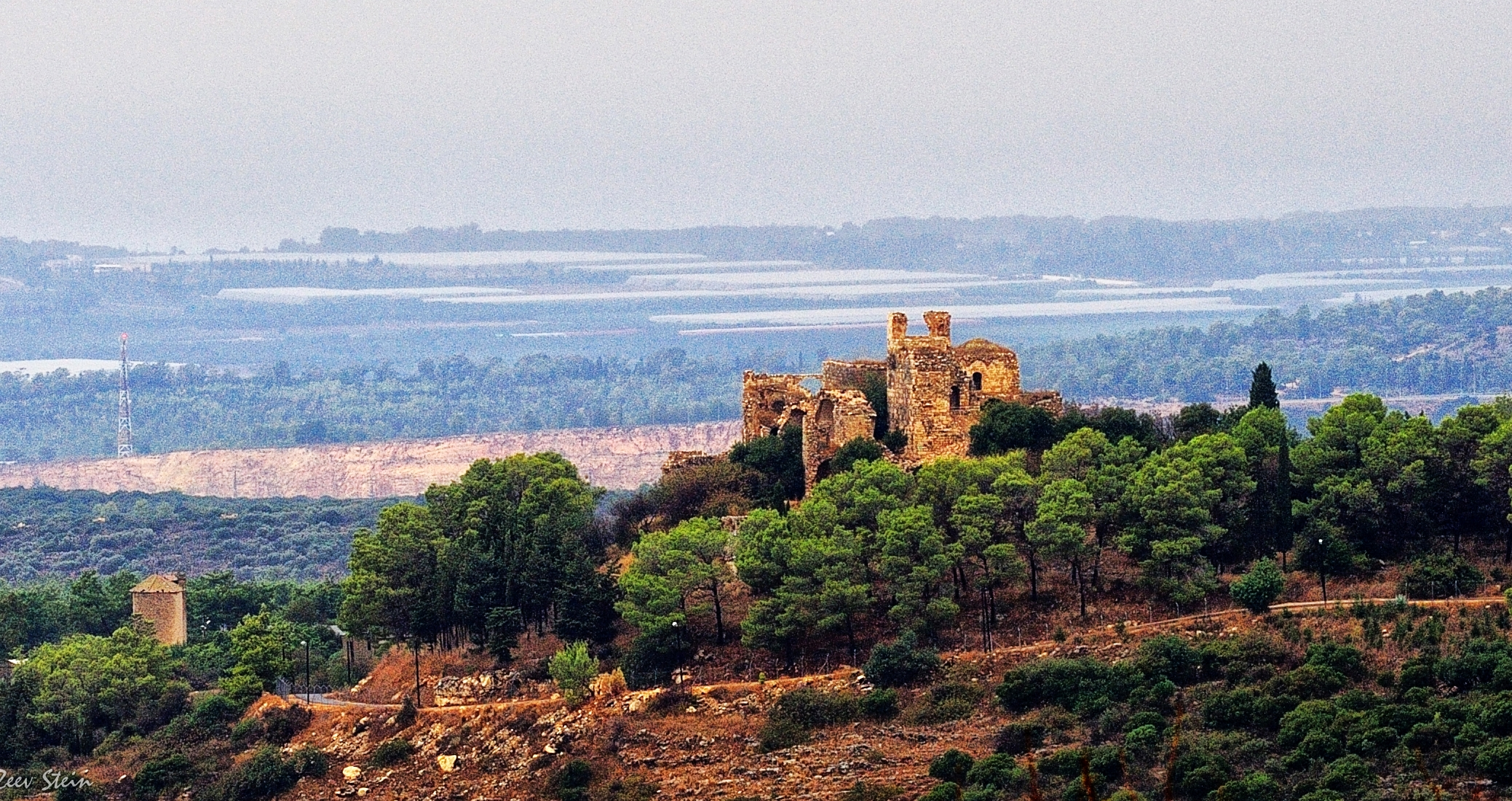
Jiddin and its surroundings

Jiddin is located 16 kilometers (9.9 mi) northeast of Acre in the western Galilee. It sits 415 meters (1,362 ft) above sea level, on a rocky spur of the northern ridge overlooking the Wadi Jiddin ravine. The wadi extends northeastward from Amqa, a village on the edge of Acre's coastal plain, passes below Jiddin and continues toward Tarshiha. Surrounding the fortress is a forest of Palestine oak, carob, sweet bay and storax.

== History ==
=== Byzantine period ===
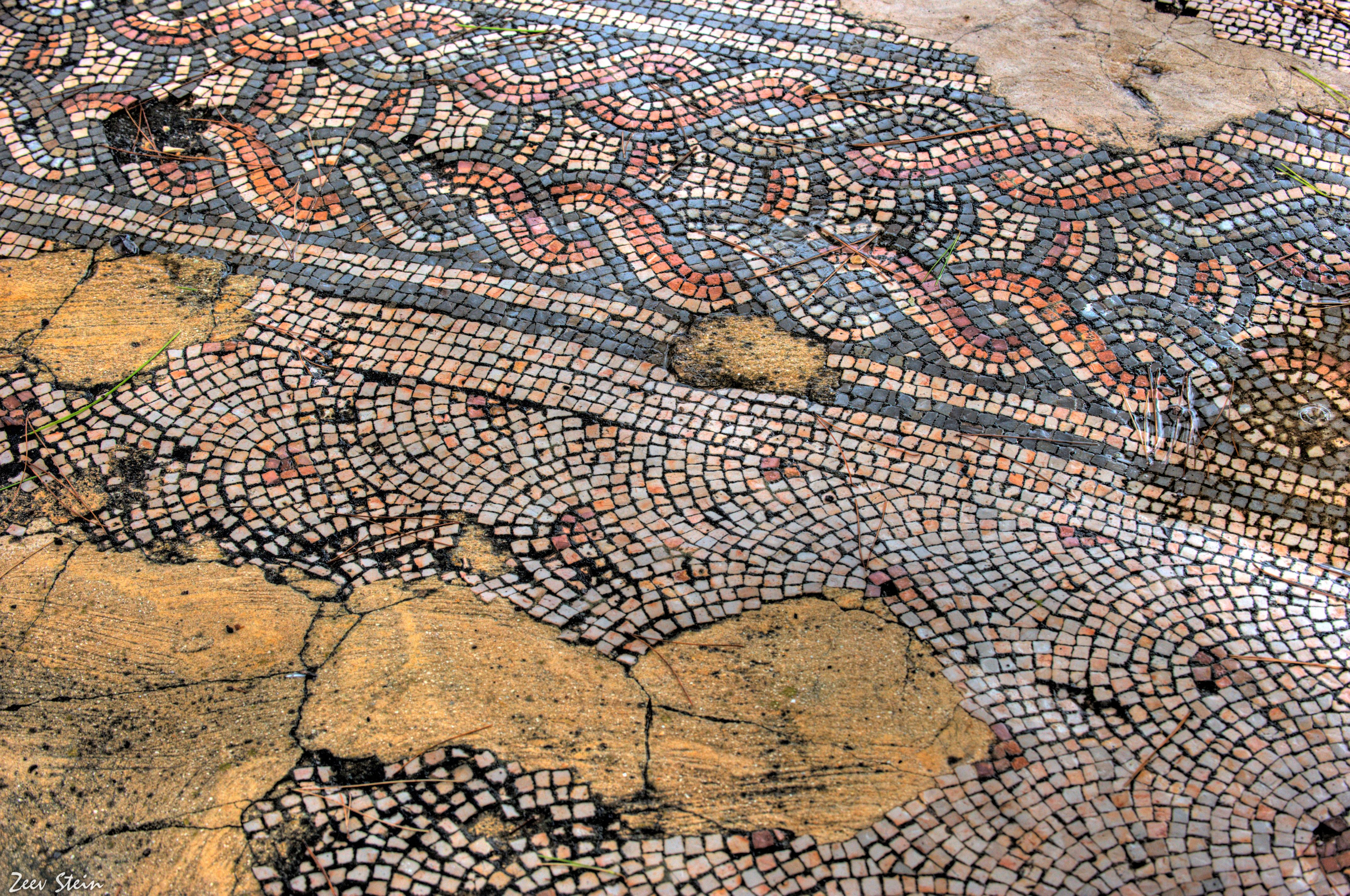
Byzantine-era mosaic at Jiddin

The site was inhabited in the Byzantine period, as indicated by the remains of low walls, masonry, and a large colored mosaic found immediately east of Jiddin during surveys in 1929 or 1948. Spolia characteristic of the late 5th to early 7th centuries are built into the fortress walls, including a stone block engraved with a cross encased in a circle.

=== Crusader period ===
The earliest mention of Jiddin in the written record was in 1283, when Burchard of Mount Sion referred to "a castle called Iudin" located "four leagues from Acre". He noted that it was "destroyed" but formerly belonged to the Teutonic Order. Modern historians credit the Teutonic Order as the builder of the fortress, dating the construction to between 1220 and 1268 (or 1271). The Teutonic knights had acquired the lands where Jiddin was located in May 1220 when they purchased a large tract from Beatrice of Henneburg, the eldest daughter and an inheritor of Joscelin III of Edessa. The nearest village to the site of Jiddin that was mentioned in the acquisition was Sophie (or Supheye) ('Khirbet Shifaya' in Arabic), which was located 2 kilometers (1.2 mi) to the north. The Teutonic knights built up a large estate in the area, founding there the castle of Montfort in 1226–1227, less than 6 kilometers (3.7 mi) north of Jiddin. Jiddin itself had likely been a gastina or khirba (ruined settlement) over which the Crusaders erected the fortress.

By 1268, most of the Teutonic holdings in the northwestern Galilee passed to the Mamluks under Sultan Baybars, who conquered Montfort in July 1271. Jiddin likely did not pass to Mamluk hands until the subsequent treaty of 21 April 1272 between Baybars and Hugh III of Cyprus and was afterward demolished by Baybars's order. Burchard's notice was largely repeated in the 1321 writings of Marino Sanudo.

=== Ottoman period ===
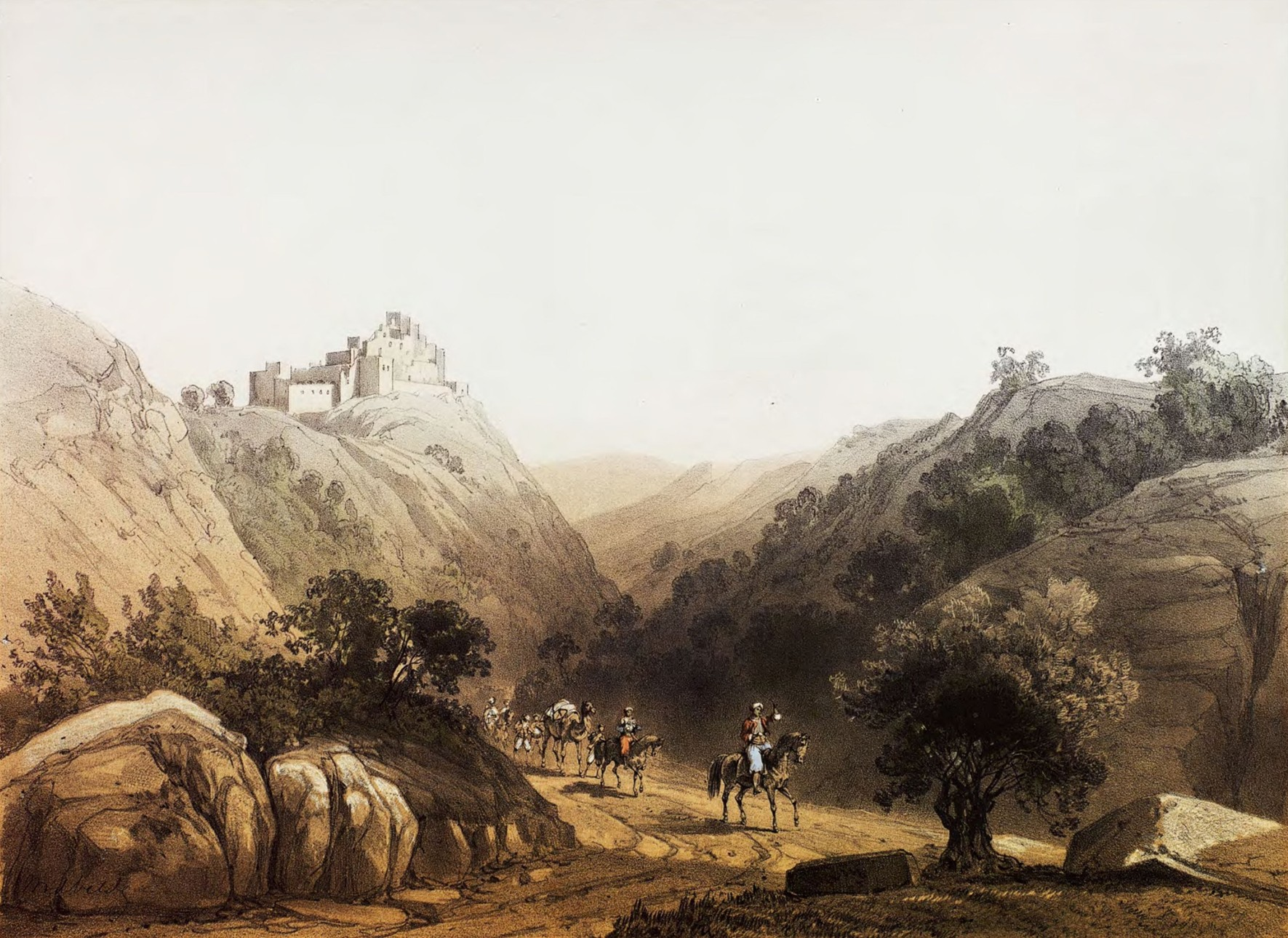
Drawing of Jiddin, 1857

By the early 18th century, during Ottoman rule (1516–1917), Jiddin was administratively part of the nahiye (subdistrict) of Sahil Akka (plain of Acre), part of Sidon Eyalet (Sidon province). The fortress became the headquarters of a local family whose sheikhs farmed the tax revenues of the subdistrict. (Note: According to historian Ahmad Hasan Joudah, Jiddin had been in the possession of Ahmad al-Husayn's "forefathers" for "many years" before it was conquered by Daher al-Umar in 1738.) In the first decade of the 18th century, the multazim (tax farmer) of Sahil Akka was Sheikh Najm. At that time, c. 1703–1704, Najm contracted with the Dutch merchant Paul Maashook to exclusively sell him all the cotton crop of his villages (Kafr Yasif, Abu Sinan, Julis, Makr, Amqa, and Tarshiha) in return for Maashook's payment of Najm's tax obligations to the governor of Sidon. Najm's cousin Husayn ibn Khaliq is later mentioned as the multazim of Sahil Akka.

Like other local chiefs, Husayn and Ahmad al-Husayn (assumably his son) drew military support from the populace and entrenched their rule by constructing a fortress, which invariably became the effective center of their nahiye. The Husayns' fortress headquarters was Jiddin. At least part of Jiddin's Ottoman-era building phases can be attributed to the Husayn family. Another local family of the Galilee, the Zayadina, began to expand their holdings across the region in the 1730s under the leadership of Sheikh Daher al-Umar. In 1738, Daher mobilized his peasant fighters and Bedouin allies from the Banu Saqr, some 1,500 men, and defeated Ahmad at Jiddin and conquered the fortress and its dependencies, including Abu Sinan and Tarshiha. Daher did not dislodge the Husayns, keeping them as vassals over Sahil Akka. Like with other local multazims kept in place by Daher through the 1740s–1760s, he underwrote the tax farms of the Husayns. A firman from June 1738 named Husayn ibn Khaliq as the controller of the Jiddin fortress and an ally of Daher; the firman directed the governor of Damascus to move against the local multazims and raze their fortresses, though the order was not executed.

The Italian traveler Giovanni Mariti visited Jiddin in July 1761 and was received by the sheikh of the fortress. Mariti did not identify the sheikh, but noted that he "commanded this castle under Daher". Mariti describes a generous reception by the sheikh and his hosting of a bayram (feast) of roasted stuffed sheep and pilaf, boiled vegetables and pulses with seasoned meats, thin cakes (as bread), and small bowls of leben. The meal was preceded by the sheikh's invocation for heavenly blessings and followed by cups of coffee and pipe smoking around a circle. On the following morning Mariti toured the fortress with a dozen of the sheikh's men, noting that it "enjoys an advantageous exposure, as it commands a view of various hills; of the plains of Acre, equally fertile and agreeable; and of a large extent of sea". Around the fortress, he mentioned dwellings inhabited by Muslim Arab subjects of the sheikh. Roughly 6 miles (9.7 km) from the fortress, on a steep decline, were the sheikh's gardens, also called Jiddin, which spanned many miles in a "spacious valley abounding with excellent fruits", including olives, almonds, peaches, apricots and figs. Streams flowing from the hills above watered the garden's thriving cotton crop. Upon his departure from Jiddin, Mariti left for its nearby dependency, Tarshiha, where he was hosted by a deputy of the sheikh.

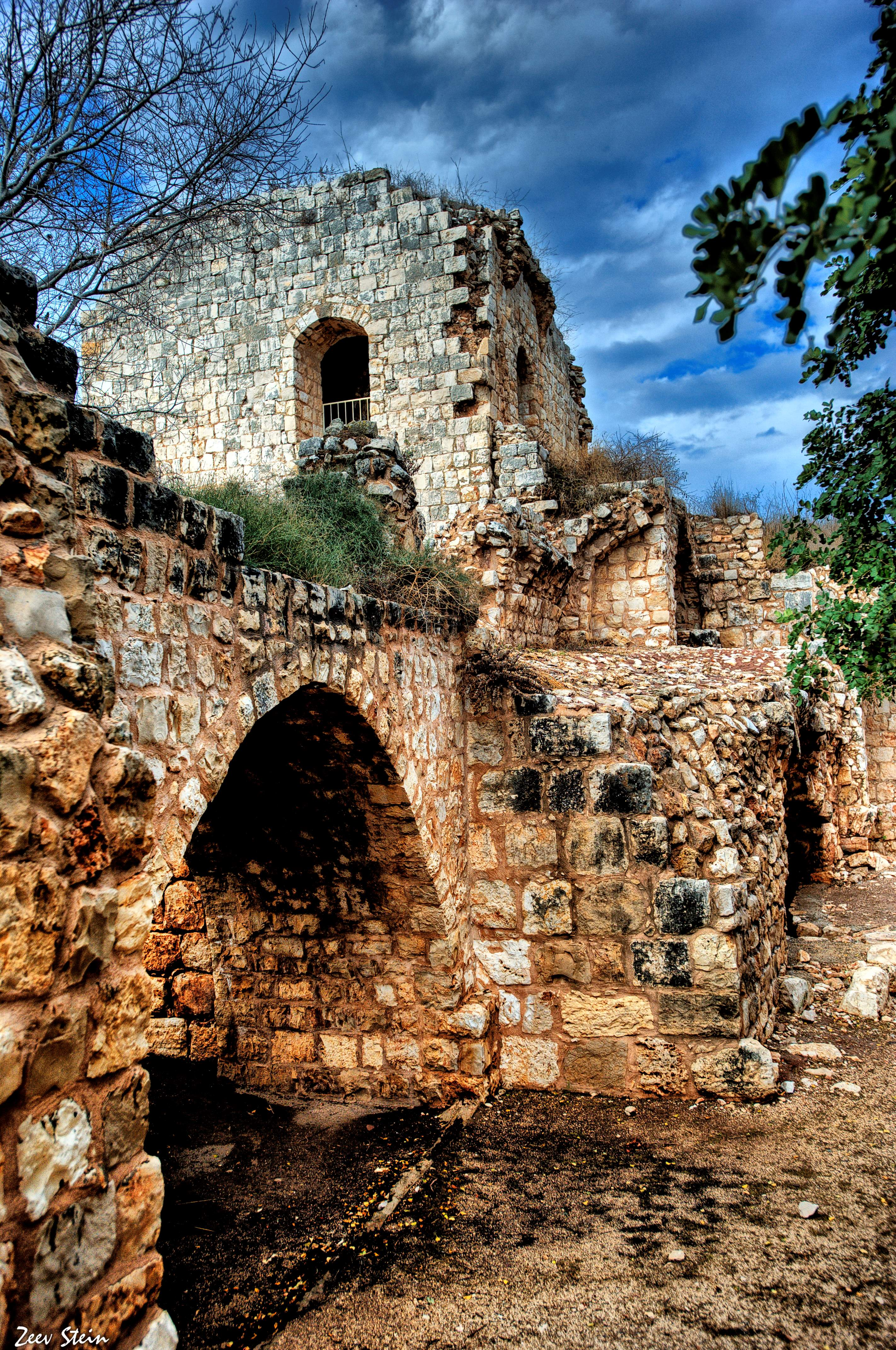
Ottoman-era fortifications at Jiddin

The Ottomans killed Daher and took control of his Acre headquarters in 1775. Soon afterward, the Ottomans appointed Ahmad Pasha al-Jazzar as the governor of Sidon and Jazzar made Acre his headquarters. His first serious challenge was subduing the Zayadina, who continued to control much of Acre's Galilee countryside. The chief rebel was Daher's son, Ali al-Daher of Safed. Jiddin was listed among the roughly fifteen fortress villages under Ali's control. After a series of battles, Ali was defeated by Jazzar and later killed in late 1776. A multazim of Sahil Akka from the Husayn family, Muhammad al-Husayn, launched a rebellion in late 1778, coinciding with other local risings against Jazzar by remnants of the Zayadina, as well as the Metawalis (Twelver Shia Muslims) of southern Lebanon. Jazzar dismantled Jiddin and the village of al-Bassa thereafter replaced it as the administrative center of Sahil Akka. The dwellings around the castle were afterward abandoned and part of the inhabitants may have settled in the nearby dependency of Khirbet Ja'thun to the west.

A map by Pierre Jacotin from Napoleon's invasion of 1799 showed the place, named as Chateau de Geddin. In 1838, Eli Smith listed Jiddin as a ruin or deserted place. French explorer Victor Guérin visited in 1875, and provided the first written details about the fortress and its surroundings:

By its gigantic remains Kal'at Djeddin still creates an imposing effect … It has been constructed with rectangular stones of medium size; only the lower courses are of larger blocks. Two large square towers, each lacking its upper storey, are still three-quarters standing and contain within them several rooms, at present very dilapidated; the staircases which lead to them have been purposely deprived of some of their steps to make access more difficult. Below extend store-rooms and stables, whose vaults rest on several rows of arcades. Cisterns cut into the rock extend under a paved courtyard. … Below and adjoining the castle, a second enceinte, flanked by semi-circular towers, encloses within it the remains of numerous demolished houses, cisterns and scrub, which grows everywhere amid the debris. To the north and east, gardens long since abandoned are in the same way invaded by thorns and wild shrubs, which entwine and stifle the figs, pomegranates and olives.

At some point in the 19th century, three or four dwellings were built inside the ruins of the fortress. Both Guérin and an earlier 19th century traveler to the area, William McClure Thomson (c. 1859), noted that the fortress remains were inhabited by Bedouin shepherds and their flocks. When Herbert Kitchener of the Palestine Exploration Fund inspected the place in 1877, he found it "quite unoccupied, though there are several chambers and vaults that could serve as habitations." He noted that the surrounding area was dominated by Bedouins, save for a few cultivated hamlets. In the same year, Kitchener observed quality Arab masonry and that "Some parts of the castle are in a fair state of repair, though now it is entirely deserted and is rapidly falling to ruin"

=== British Mandate period ===
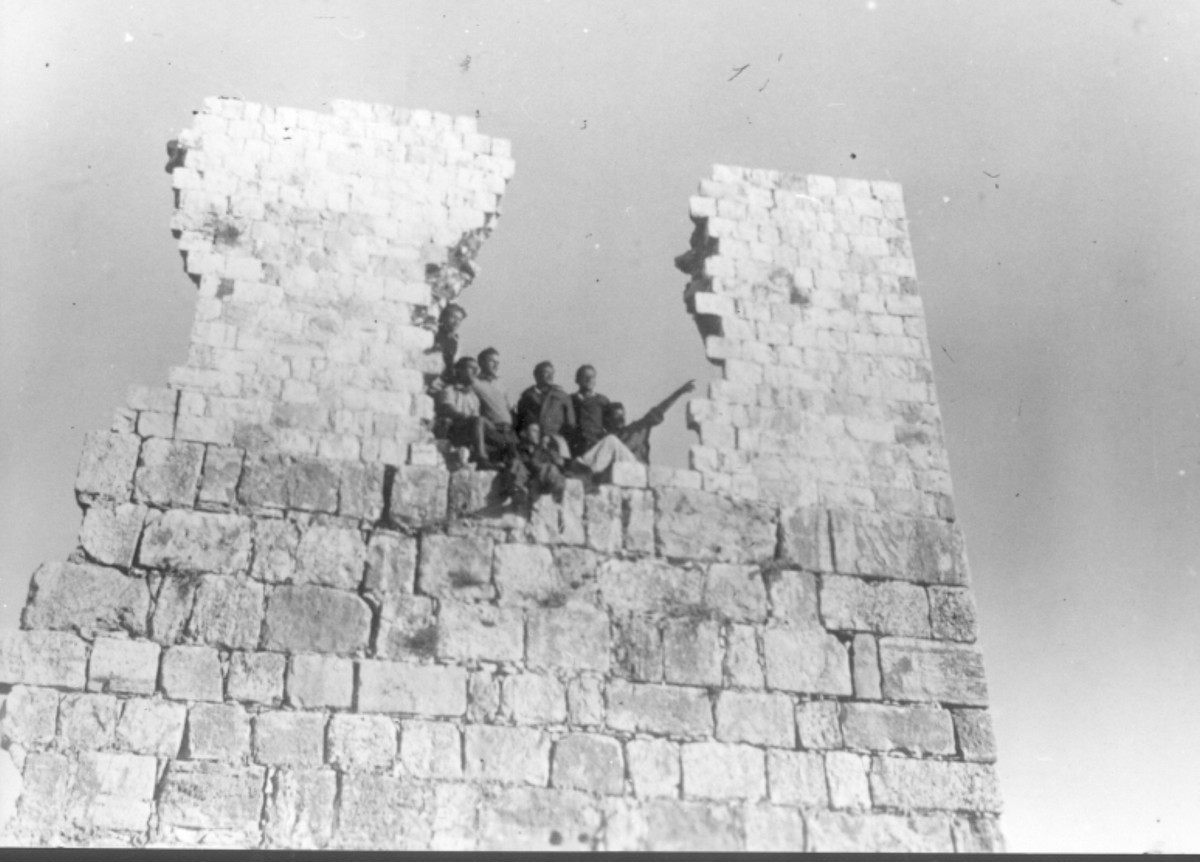
Members of the Palmach on top of one of Jiddin's towers, 1946

One of the houses within the fortress was occupied up to the 1930s, during British Mandate rule in Palestine (1920–1948). According to historian Walid Khalidi, the Bedouins of the Suwaytat (Suweitat) tribe, lived in the fortress and encamped around it until 1948, when it was captured by Jewish forces during the 1948 Palestine war. The 1945 village statistics counted the Suwaytat as a tribe living within the boundaries of nearby Tarshiha; no population was given.

In the late 1930s (before 1939), the Jewish National Fund purchased 3,348 dunams of land belonging to Jiddin around the fortress from the inheritors of brothers Rif'at and Abdul Latif Saleh. The brothers belonged to a Turkish family from Haifa and had other landholdings in Jo'ara, Ayn Ghazal, and al-Tira. The transaction was brokered by the Haifa-based Zur Investment and Building Company, which reported that there were no Arab tenant farmers on the purchased tract(s) or need for land reclamation. The 1945 village statistics showed Jiddin's lands totaled 7,587 dunams, of which 4,238 were Arab-owned and 3,349 were Jewish-owned. The lands were classified as uncultivable save for 22 dunams of Arab land and 32 dunams of Jewish land which were taxed as planted with cereals.

In November 1946, Jewish survivors of the Holocaust in Hungary and Yishuv (Palestinian-born Jews) established the kibbutz of Yehi'am on the JNF lands. Its proximity to the fortress was considered a strategic gain by the Zionist movement.

=== 1948 Palestine war and aftermath ===
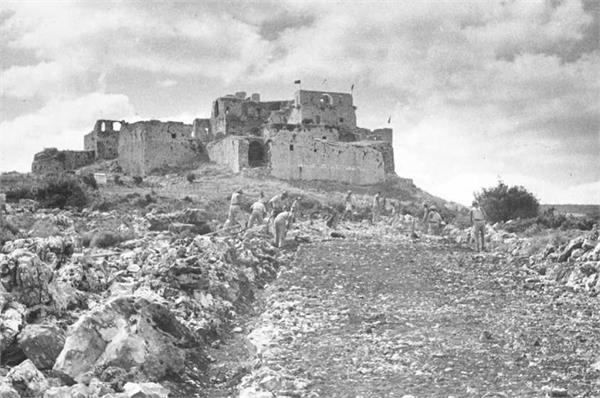
Jiddin fortress and Jewish fighters in the foreground, June 1947

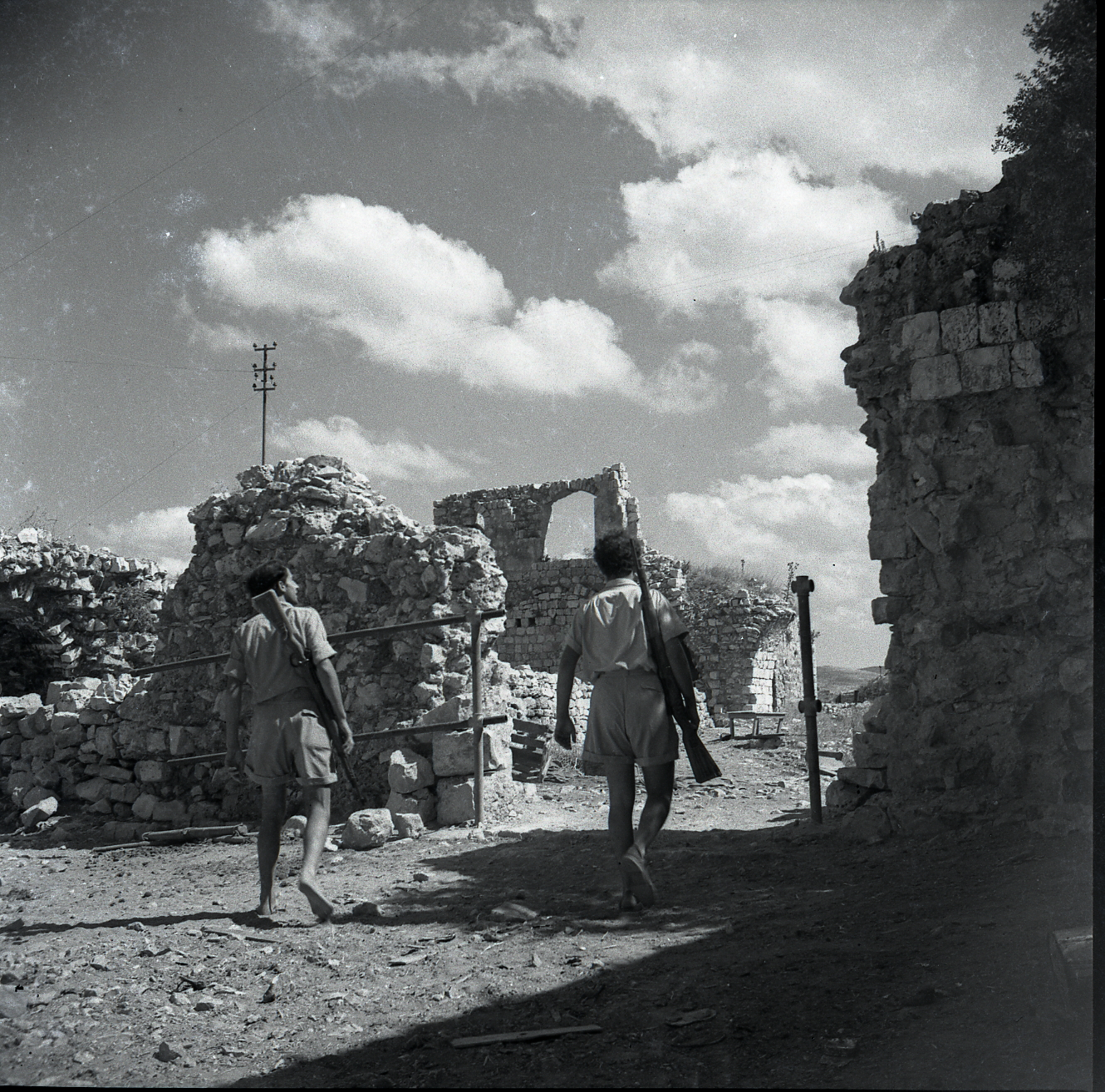
Jewish fighters on the fortress grounds, May 1948

In January 1948, during the 1947–1948 civil war in Mandatory Palestine, the first unit of the Arab Liberation Army to deploy in Palestine targeted Jiddin for capture. The unit, the 2nd Yarmouk Battalion led by future Syrian president Adib Shishakli, consisted mainly of Syrian volunteers from Hama and local Palestinians under Tawfiq al-Ibrahim (Abu Ibrahim al-Saghir). It was headquartered in Tarshiha. On 20 January, the 2nd Yarmouk Battalion moved against the fortress, whose roughly 50 to 100 armed defenders, including ten women and some 30 members of the Haganah's Palmach unit, were isolated from other Jewish settlements.

The Jewish forces were well prepared, having received intelligence of the impending assault and commandeered the fortress. The 200 to 300-strong Arab force, equipped with a mortar, rifles and light machine guns, launched the assault, their first major operation in Palestine, at dawn on 20 January, cutting off the roads leading to Jiddin and attacking the fortress from all sides. A Jewish police convoy en route to Jiddin was ambushed by the ALA, killing four and injuring another four of the eleven-man convoy. The ALA unit was held back by mortar fire and the defenders made contact with Nahariya, the nearest Jewish town, securing the deployment of a British army relief force of armored cars and a platoon from the 2nd Middlesex Regiment. British forces clashed with the ALA on the approaches to Jiddin and Arab forces subsequently began withdrawing by noon. British forces afterward evacuated dead and wounded Jewish fighters. During the evening of 20–21 January, a 60-strong Haganah troop arrived and helped stave off a renewed ALA assault, ending after one hour with the death of an Arab fighter.

Yehi'am and the fortress remained besieged and Arab forces nearly eliminated a convoy of Jewish reinforcements from the Haganah heading to Yehi'am near al-Kabri on 27 March. The siege was lifted in May 1948. The Haganah gained control of the area during Operation Hiram in October. The area, which had been allotted to the Arab state in the 1947 United Nations Partition Plan for Palestine, thereafter became part of the state of Israel, which had been declared on 11 May 1948. In 1967, the Jiddin fortress was declared the Yehi'am Fortress National Park (see below).

== Architecture and archaeology ==
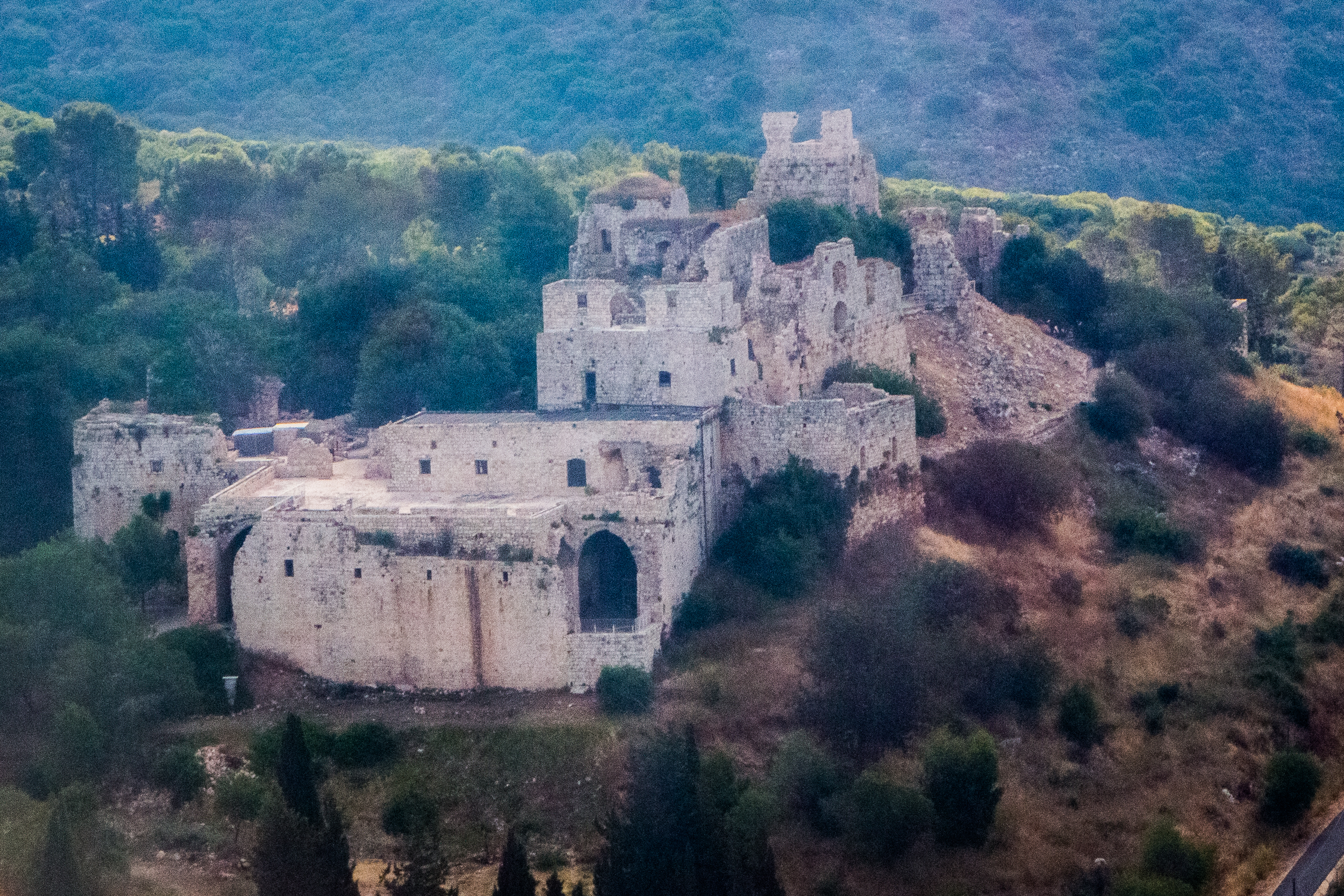
Aerial of Jiddin fortress

The breadth of the fortress is roughly 120 meters (390 ft) and its length is 80 meters (260 ft). It consists of an upper and lower ward. The upper ward, which includes much of the castle's Crusader-period remains, sits on the higher part of the ridge, covering an area of 80 meters (260 ft) by 35 meters (115 ft). It is composed of two large towers, 21 meters (69 ft) apart, each at one end of the ridgeline and enclosed by a curtain wall, parts of which act as a retaining wall for vaults and terraces. The fortress is of Crusader (Frankish) foundation and was largely reconstructed and expanded during the Ottoman period in the 18th century. The Ottoman phases of construction transformed the ruins of the fortress "into a stately, fortified residence", according to Denys Pringle et al.

The architecture of Jiddin's Frankish upper ward is similar to nearby Montfort, another Teutonic-built fortress. Both are architecturally distinct from other Crusader castles in Palestine and borrow none of the innovations or features of the 13th century forts built by the Templars and Hospitallers. Their form was modeled on the 12th and 13th century castles of the Rhineland, from which the Teutonic Order sprung. The curtail-wall enclosed dual towers of Jiddin strongly resembles German castles of the same time period in Munzenberg. Based on its size it likely housed 20 to 30 knights under a castellan and probably a larger number of Turcopoles, archers and servants. The lower ward, bastion and main residential quarters date to the 18th century. There may have been two phases of construction, an earlier phase under the Husayns and a later more substantive phase under the Zayadina. The basic 18th century features of an outer and inner ward, round towers and gun slits, appear in other Zaydani forts, namely Deir Hanna and Tiberias. The closely clustered structures erected in the lower ward, namely the mosque, bathhouse and residential quarters, a typical feature of Islamic architecture, may indicate the existence of a village within the fortress.

=== Frankish towers ===
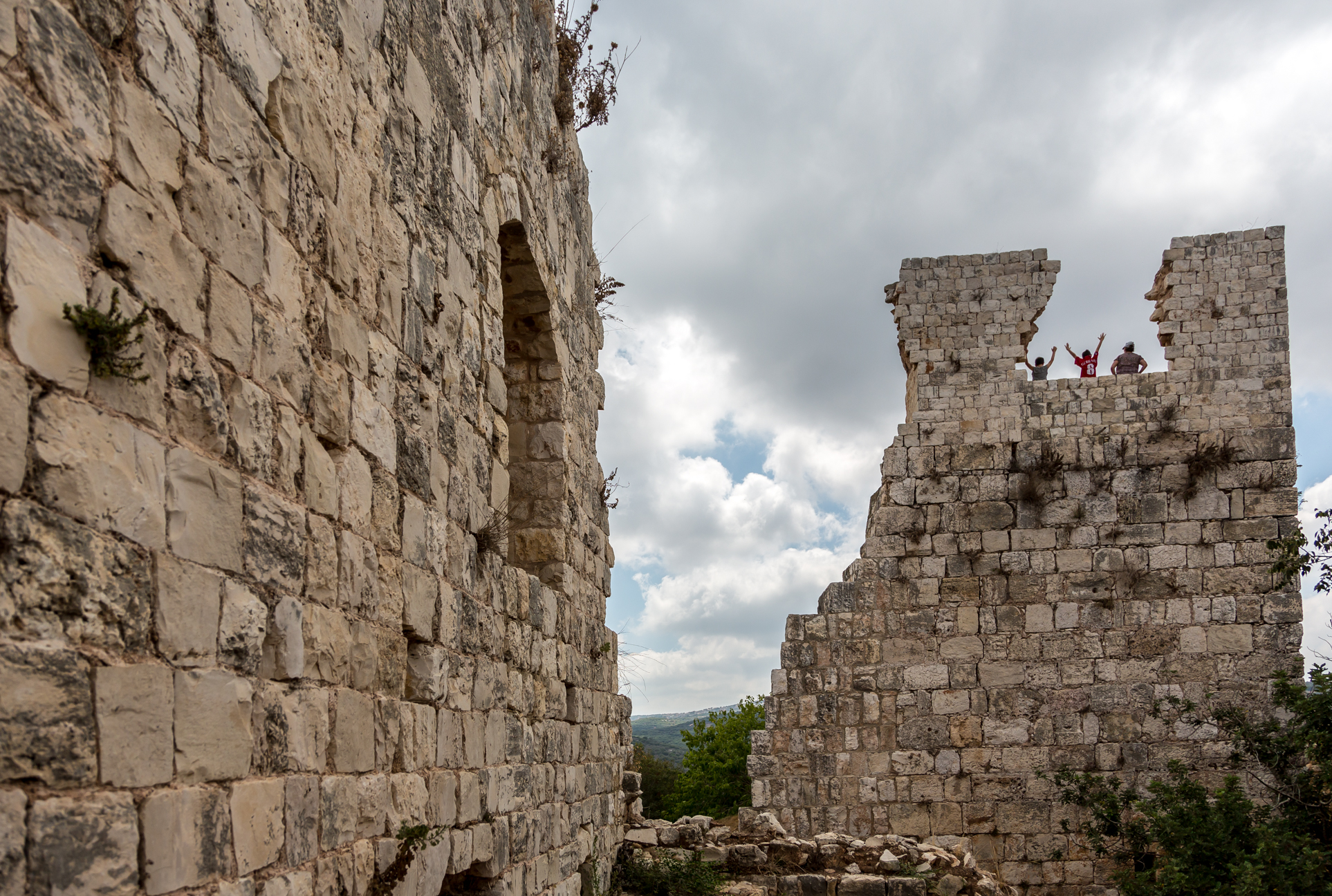
The east tower of the upper ward

The eastern tower is of somewhat older date and is the highest point of the fortress. At the time of its survey in 1992 it stood 12.5 meters (41 ft) high with dimensions of 16 by 15.5 meters (52 ft × 51 ft). Its northeastern portion was collapsed, but it originally consisted of two stories. The tower is built of smooth masonry blocks, some of which were Byzantine-era spolia. Its doorway opens on its west side and leads directly into its barrel vaulted basement, which measures 6.5 by 8 meters (21 ft × 26 ft), while another door on the south entranceway opens to a staircase leading to the upper floors of the tower. The tower was heightened in the 18th century, as observed by the transition of Crusader-period masonry to smaller, Ottoman-period masonry toward the top floor.

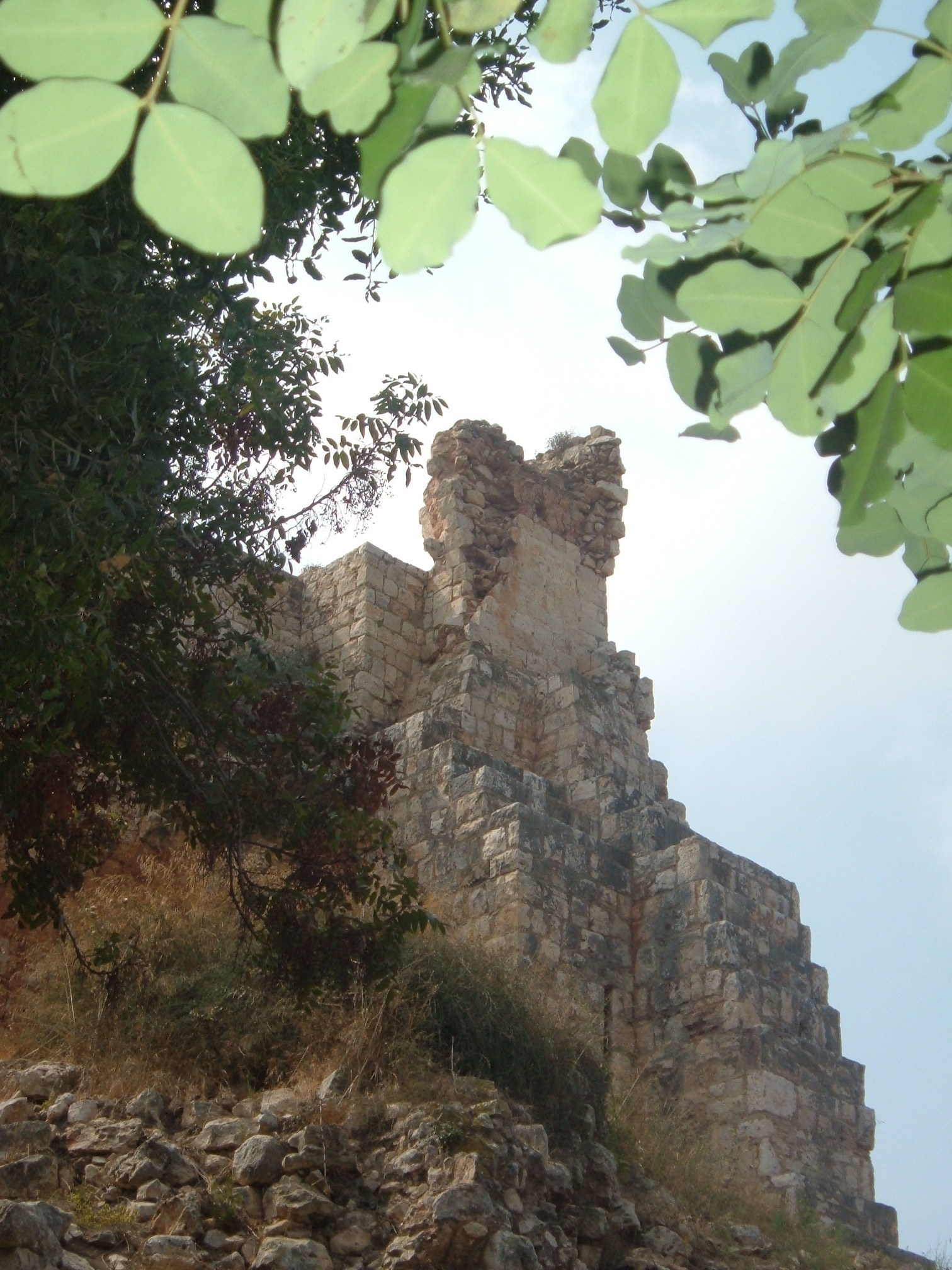
The west tower of the upper ward

The western tower, 14 meters (46 ft) high, stands on a slightly lower part of the ridgeline. It spans 16 square meters (170 ft^{2}) and is built of ashlar blocks. Its northern and western walls are largely collapsed. The two lower floors of the three-story tower are made up of twin barrel vaults and the top floor consists of nine groin vaulted bays. The remains of the west wall and the vaulting of the first and second floors consist of small, 18th century masonry. The damage to the tower was likely caused by an earthquake or gunpowder. The ground floor or basement is blocked off by collapsed stone and later constructions along the south and east walls. On the first story level, the barrel vaults are pointed and the southern and eastern walls date to the Crusader period, while the remains of the west wall, including its round-arched opening, are an Ottoman reconstruction. Most of the second, or top, floor is ruined and the remains of its west wall and its vaulting date to the Ottoman period.

=== Curtain walls ===
Remains of the inner, Crusader-era walls enclosing the upper ward are present northwest and southwest of the towers and both stand 12 meters (39 ft) high. The north wall is dressed with large ashlar blocks at the bottom with smaller blocks at the top. On the upper section there are two rows of three arrow slits 5 meters (16 ft) apart and on the lower section of its projecting wall are two slits and two corbels forming a box machicolation. The Ottoman phases added three rows of putlog holes on the upper part of the north wall. The wall on the southwest has a row of four arrow slits 5 meters (16 ft) apart and on the inside are remains of vaults.

In the 18th century, an outer enclosure wall was built with two round corner towers and a gateway in the center of its north wall, which became the main entrance to the fortress complex. The gateway is built into a round bastion and the current gate was restored in the 20th century. On the bastion's south is a two-story structure with groin vaults, buttressed on its east side, and to the west are ruined barrel-vaulted structures, the outermost forming part of the enclosure wall. A large barrel-vaulted space lies in the northwest corner. The portion of the wall running east of the bastion terminates at the northeastern corner tower, which consists of two stories, the top mostly collapsed and the lower having a domed ceiling. The wall running southwest of this tower is mostly ruined but stretches some 50 meters (160 ft) to the other corner tower. This tower is well preserved and contains gun slits in arched indents. There are only few traces remaining of the southern part of the enclosure wall.

=== Mosque, bathhouse and vaulted hall ===
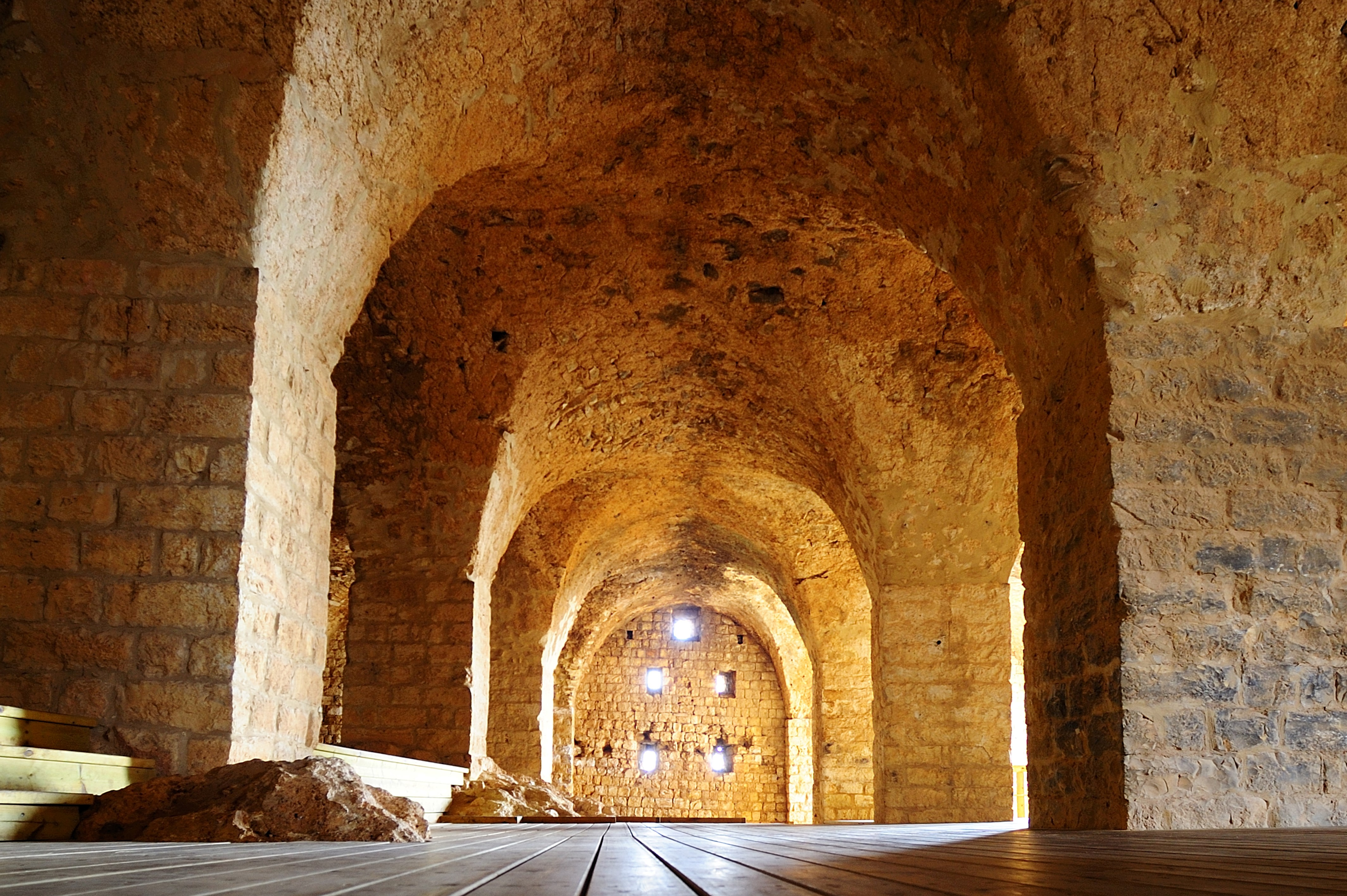
The vaulted basement hall

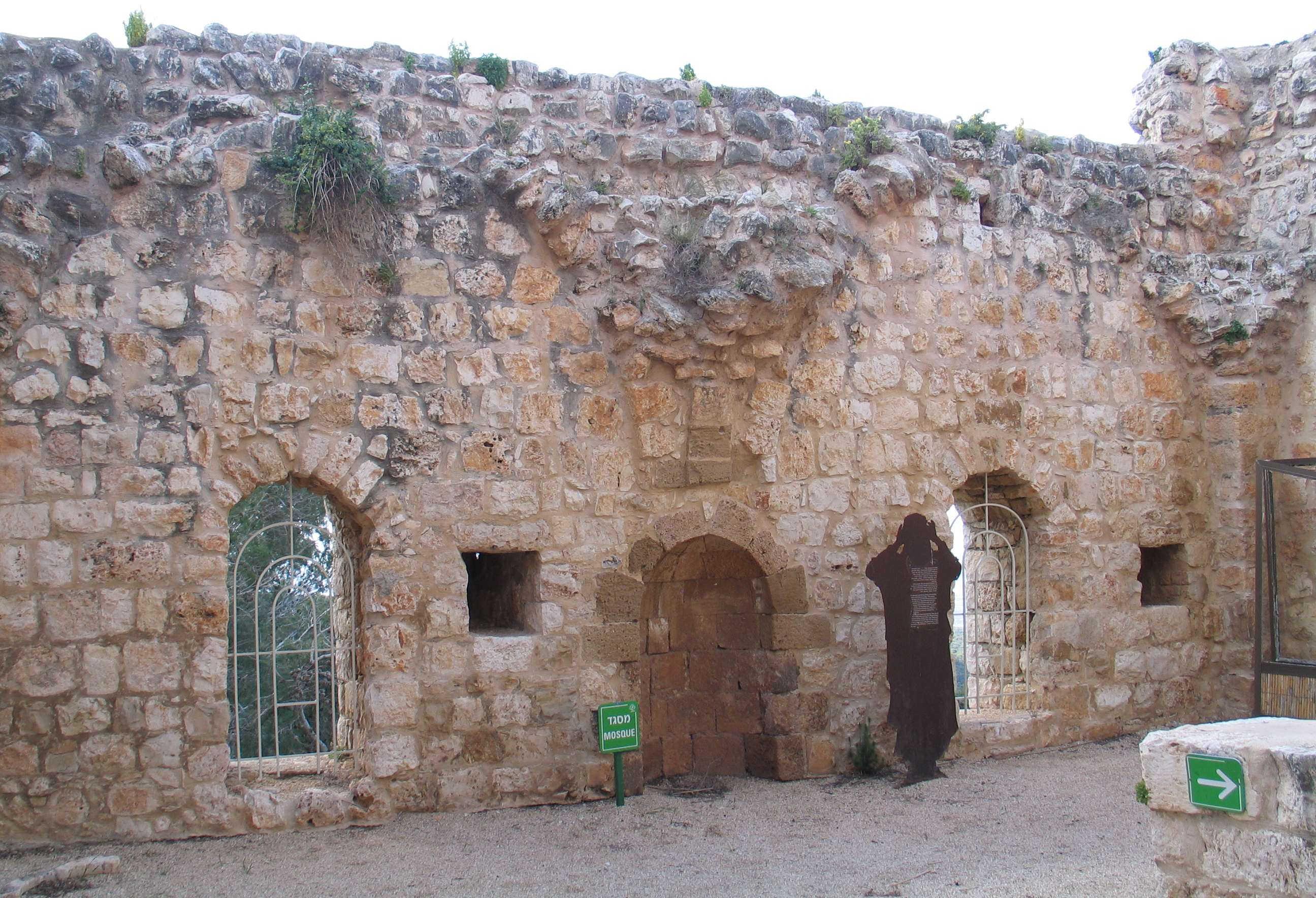
Remains of the fortress mosque with mihrab in center

The 18th century constructions extended the upper ward to the west with a 1,000 square meters (11,000 ft^{2}) rectangular platform. Underneath the platform are four rows of six groin vaults enclosed by walls on the north, south and west. This vaulted hall, which rested on the rows of square pillars, formed the basement of the palatial residence and the associated structures above, including the mosque and hammam (bathhouse).

The ruined hammam (bathhouse) consists of two 2.5 square meters (27 ft^{2}) rooms, relatively small compared to those found in urban centers. The mosque lies southeast of the platform and has a trapezoidal plan and a collapsed roof. Its walls are characterized by shallow arches, each with a small arched window and cupboard. The mihrab is built of kurkar (marine sandstone), distinguishing it from the rest of the fortress which is built of limestone.

=== Houses ===
Four houses likely dating to the 19th century were built within the fortress. The house south of the west tower has a large, domed middle room winged by two small rooms and fronting a courtyard. Between the two towers is another house with groin-vaulted room and a vaulted portico on its east side. Atop the east tower are the remains of a house and between the west tower and the mosque is another unfinished house with a central liwan that opens to a backroom and two side rooms.

== Yehi'am Fortress National Park ==
Among the fortress attractions at the national park are the watchtower with a lookout platform, the mosque, and the large vaulted hall.

Archaeological finds in the park but outside the castle precinct include the remains of a Roman fort, a Byzantine monastery, burial caves, stones inscribed with crosses and fragments of mosaic.

== See also ==
- Archeology of Israel
- Depopulated Palestinian locations in Israel
- Tourism in Israel

== Bibliography ==
- Avneri, Arieh L. (2017) [1980]. The Claim of Dispossession: Jewish Land Settlement and the Arabs 1878-1948. Translated by Kfar-Blum Translation Group. London and New York: Routledge. ISBN 978-0-87855-964-0.
- Benveniśtî, Meron (2000). Sacred landscape: the buried history of the Holy Land since 1948. University of California Press. ISBN 978-0-520-23422-2.
- Cohen, Amnon (1973). Palestine in the Eighteenth Century: Patterns of Government and Administration. Jerusalem: Hebrew University. ISBN 1-59045-955-5.
- Conder, C.R.; Kitchener, H.H. (1881). The Survey of Western Palestine: Memoirs of the Topography, Orography, Hydrography, and Archaeology. Vol. 1. London: Committee of the Palestine Exploration Fund.
- Government of Palestine, Department of Statistics (1945). Village Statistics, April, 1945.
- Guérin, V. (1880). Description Géographique Historique et Archéologique de la Palestine (in French). Vol. 3: Galilee, pt. 2. Paris: L'Imprimerie Nationale.
- Hadawi, S. (1970). Village Statistics of 1945: A Classification of Land and Area ownership in Palestine. Palestine Liberation Organization Research Center. Archived from the original on 2018-12-08.
- Joudah, Ahmad Hasan (1987). Revolt in Palestine in the Eighteenth Century: The Era of Shaykh Zahir al-'Umar. Kingston Press. ISBN 978-0-940670-11-2.
- Kadish, Alon (2020). The British Army in Palestine and the 1948 War: Containment, Withdrawal and Evacuation (ebook ed.). Abingdon, Oxon and New York: Routledge. ISBN 9780429453649.
- Karmon, Y. (1960). "An Analysis of Jacotin's Map of Palestine" (PDF). Israel Exploration Journal. 10 (3, 4): 155–173, 244–253. Archived from the original (PDF) on 2019-12-22.
- Kennedy, Hugh (1994). Crusader Castles. Cambridge: Cambridge University Press. ISBN 0-521-42068-7.
- Khalidi, Walid (1992). All That Remains: The Palestinian Villages Occupied and Depopulated by Israel in 1948. Washington D.C.: Institute for Palestine Studies. ISBN 0-88728-224-5.
- Kitchener, H.H. (1877). "Lieutenant Kitchener's Report". Quarterly Statement–Palestine Exploration Fund. 9: 165–178. doi:10.1179/peq.1877.9.4.165.
- Kitchener, H.H. (1878). "List of Photographs Taken in Galilee with Descriptions". Quarterly Statement–Palestine Exploration Fund. 10 (3): 134–141. doi:10.1179/peq.1878.10.3.134.
- Laurent, J. C. M., ed. (1864). Peregrinatores Medii Aevi Quatuor (in Latin). Leipzig: J.C. Hinrichs.
- Levenberg, Haim (1993). Military Preparations of the Arab Community in Palestine, 1945–1948. London: Frank Cass. ISBN 0-7146-3439-5.
- Mariti, Giovanni (1792). Travels Through Cyprus, Syria, and Palestine; with a General History of the Levant, volume 1. Dublin: P. Byrne.
- Morris, B. (2004). The Birth of the Palestinian Refugee Problem Revisited. Cambridge University Press. ISBN 978-0-521-00967-6.
- Orni, Efraim (2007). "Yeḥiʾam". In Skolnik, F.; Berenbaum, M. (eds.). Encyclopedia Judaica, Second Edition. Vol. 21. Thomson Gale. p. 294. ISBN 0-02-865949-X.
- Palmer, E.H. (1881). The Survey of Western Palestine: Arabic and English Name Lists Collected During the Survey by Lieutenants Conder and Kitchener, R. E. Transliterated and Explained by E.H. Palmer. Committee of the Palestine Exploration Fund. (p. 51)
- Petersen, Andrew (2001). A Gazetteer of Buildings in Muslim Palestine (British Academy Monographs in Archaeology). Vol. I. Oxford University Press. ISBN 978-0-19-727011-0. Archived from the original on 2021-05-28.
- Philipp, Thomas (2001). Acre: The Rise and Fall of a Palestinian City, 1730–1831. Columbia University Press. ISBN 978-0-231-50603-8.
- Pringle, D.; Petersen, Andrew; Dow, Martin; Singer, Caroline (1994). "Qalʿat Jiddin: A Castle of the Crusader and Ottoman Periods in Galilee". Levant. 2: 135–166.
- Pringle, Denys (1997). Secular Buildings in the Crusader Kingdom of Jerusalem: an Archaeological Gazetter. Cambridge University Press. ISBN 0521-46010-7. (pp. 80–82)
- Pringle, Denys (1998). The Churches of the Crusader Kingdom of Jerusalem: L-Z (excluding Tyre). Vol. II. Cambridge University Press. ISBN 0-521-39037-0. (p. 162)
- Smith, Eli (1841). "Lists of Arabic Names of Places in Palestine and the Adjacent Regions". In Robinson, E.; Smith, E. (eds.). Biblical Researches in Palestine, Mount Sinai and Arabia Petraea: A Journal of Travels in the year 1838. Vol. 3. Boston: Crocker & Brewster. pp. 112–196.
