= Neetzan Zimmerman =

- Born: 1981 (age 44–45); Israel
- Education: Boston University
- Occupations: Journalist; blogger
- Years active: 2008–present
- Known for: Viral Internet ephemera
- Children: 1

Neetzan Zimmerman (born 1981) is an American journalist and blogger. He gained attention for his tireless aggregation of Internet ephemera at his blog The Daily What, which Cheezburger acquired in 2010, and Gawker. In 2023, The New York Times described him as a "a well-known digital traffic maven".

Zimmerman worked at Gawker from 2012 to 2014, spurring an influx of pageviews by writing short articles about viral topics he found by scrolling through numerous web feeds. After Gawker, Zimmerman served as editor-in-chief at startup company Whisper before moving to The Hill, where he was senior director of audience and strategy from 2015 to 2018. Zimmerman briefly worked at Lightspeed Venture Partners before becoming chief growth officer of The Messenger when it launched in 2023. It shut down in 2024 after amassing nearly 100 million monthly pageviews in less than a year.

== Life and career ==
Neetzan Zimmerman was raised on a left-leaning kibbutz in Israel. After completing his mandatory service for the Israel Defense Forces in Gaza, he moved to the United States to study at Boston University. While living in Brookline, Massachusetts, Zimmerman started working as Wiley-Blackwell's print promotions coordinator, a job he found tedious.

=== The Daily What ===
Zimmerman did not have many friends growing up, so ever since his teenage years he has spent much of his time on the Internet. After reading Richard Dawkins' The Selfish Gene (1976) as an adult, Zimmerman started considering Internet memes scientifically. In 2008, Zimmerman created a Tumblr blog titled The Daily What, which aggregated viral posts, memes and topics on social media, while bored at work. Zimmerman was passionate about Internet culture and strived to treat it with the same seriousness as a journalist would approach news, making it more intelligible to outsiders.

For the first three years, Zimmerman ran The Daily What anonymously. It quickly rose in popularity, reaching 500,000 unique visitors per month. One of its readers was Ben Huh, CEO of the meme website network Cheezburger, who bought The Daily What in 2010 in a bid to gain more pageviews. While Huh refused to disclose the price, Zimmerman claimed it was "a comfortable five-figures". Zimmerman quit his job, to the amusement of his boss, who secretly read the blog.

After the acquisition, Zimmerman started spending over seven hours of complete focus at his computer, finding content and publishing 30–35 articles daily for The Daily What. Impressed, Huh called him the "birth of human-API journalism". Zimmerman explained his method in detail to The Atlantic Wire. He went online as soon as he woke up, scrolling through his Google Reader, which collected posts from over 700 websites, and other sites such as Digg and Reddit to assess their viral potential.

Semafor's Ben Huh described The Daily What's articles as "sometimes irresistible, and sometimes both salacious and incredibly stupid ['Australian Woman Flashes Google Street View Car']". Know Your Meme credits the blog with popularizing the video "Double Dream Hands" and Rebecca Black's 2011 song "Friday" into viral Internet memes.

=== Gawker ===
In January 2012, Gawker's editor A. J. Daulerio announced that he was starting a "traffic-whoring" experiment. Every day, a staffer would be assigned to write trivial but enticing pieces, such as cat videos, that drove views to Gawker, ensuring the site's advertising revenue would remain afloat. Daulerio would hire Zimmerman for this very purpose, but full-time. Looking for a more relaxed schedule, Zimmerman left The Daily What and started writing for Gawker on April 9 under the position of "Editor, The Internet".

According to a December 2013 profile in The Wall Street Journal, Zimmerman's Gawker posts were generating in excess of 30 million hits per month, essentially subsidizing the ability of Gawker journalists to pursue more in-depth content.

=== Later career ===
On January 14, 2015, it was announced that Zimmerman would be leaving Whisper after a series of accusations involving the company's editorial practices. Those accusations were later retracted and a lengthy correction was issued by The Guardian. Zimmerman moved to The Hill, where he was senior director of audience and strategy from 2015 to 2018.

In May 2023, Jimmy Finkelstein started a news website called The Messenger. Finkelstein was ambitious and wanted to hire 550 journalists and reach 100 million monthly users. He hired Zimmerman as chief growth officer. Zimmerman sought to recruit "the best of the old blogosphere", including BuzzFeed's Katie Notopoulos and The Washington Post's Taylor Lorenz, before Finkelstein hired an editor-in-chief who could override his decisions.

== Personal life ==
Zimmerman lives in San Diego, California, with his wife, daughter, and their corgi.
