= Al-Sumayriyya =

al-Sumayriyya السُميريه Someleria, Katasir
- Former village
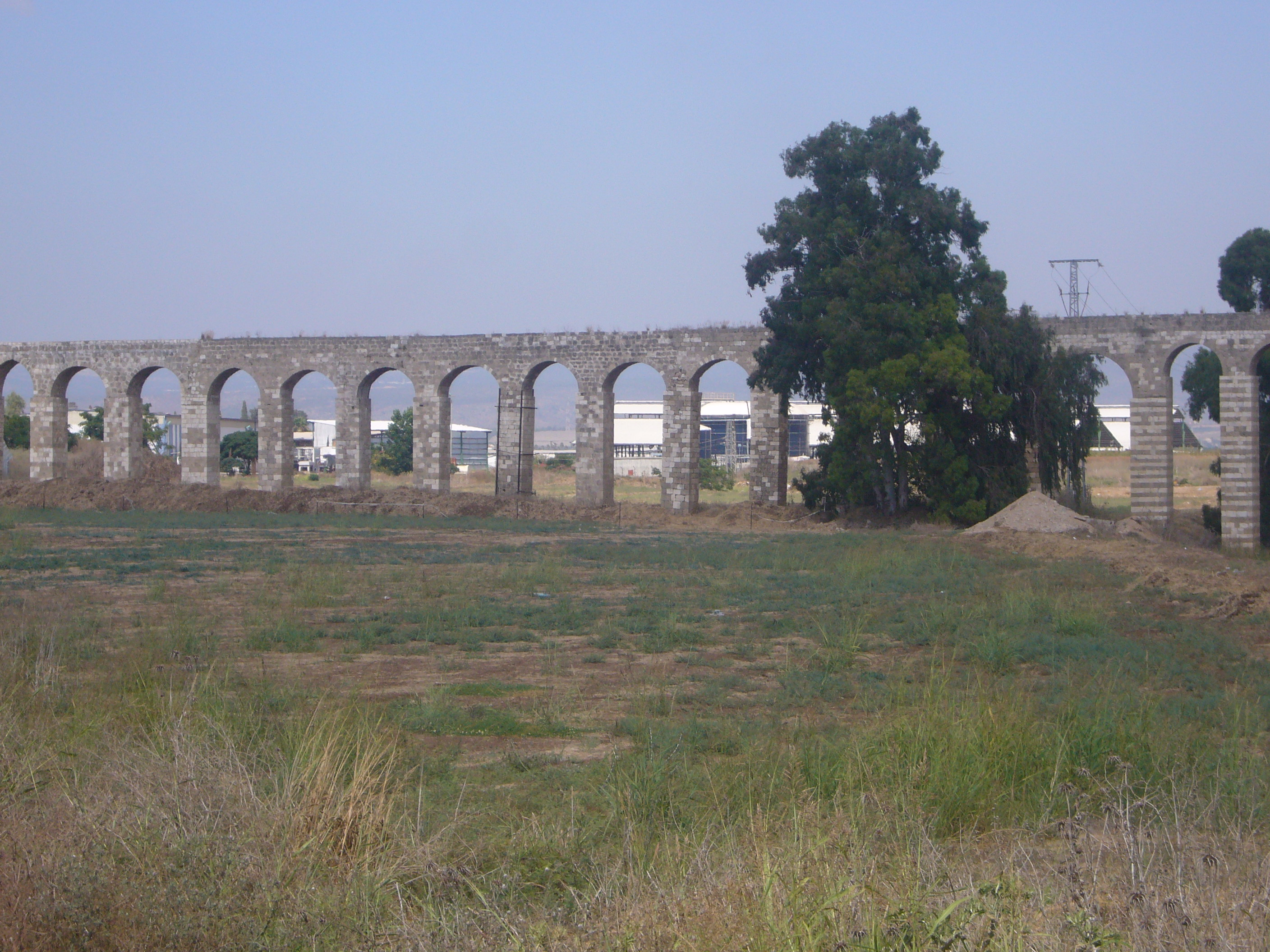
- The aqueduct in al-Sumayriyya
- Etymology: "Tawny" or "Brown"
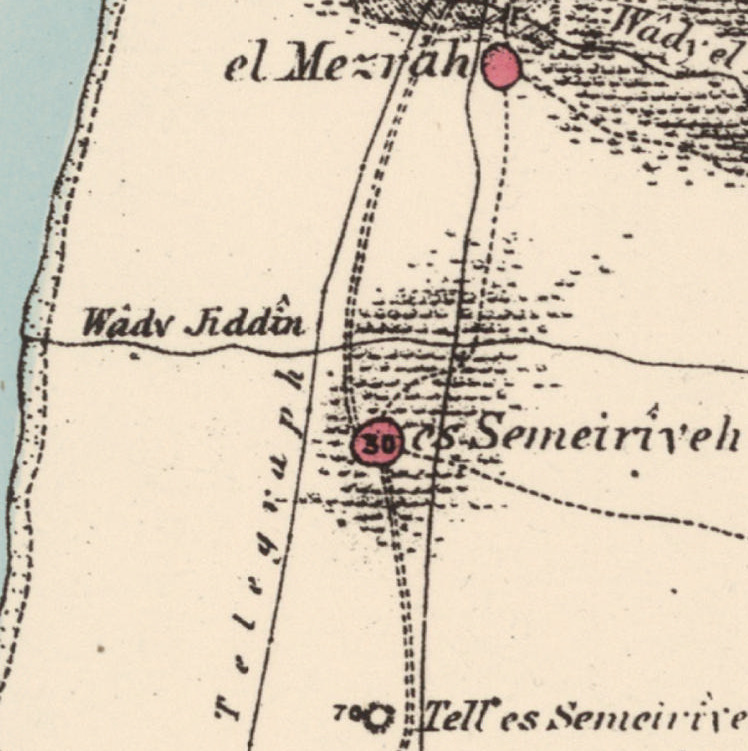
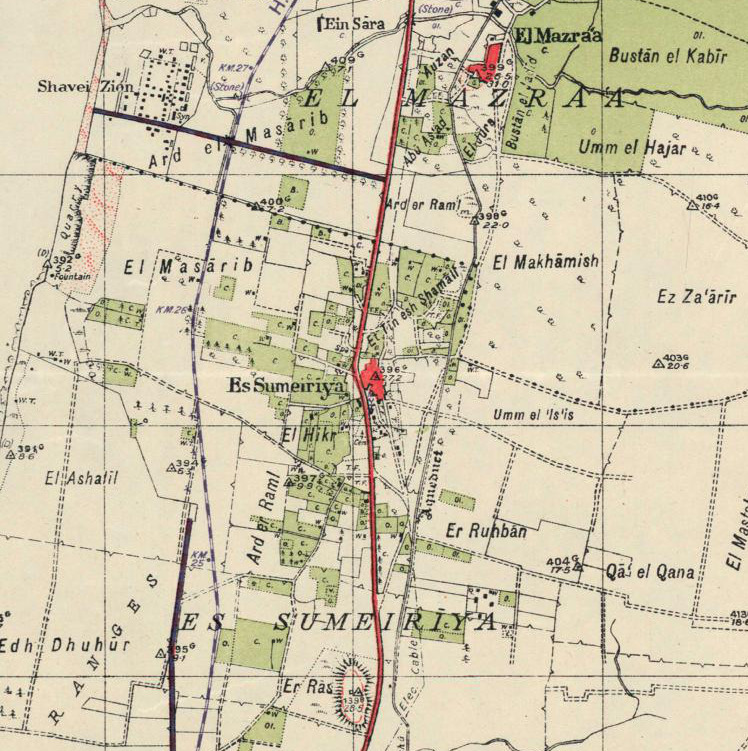
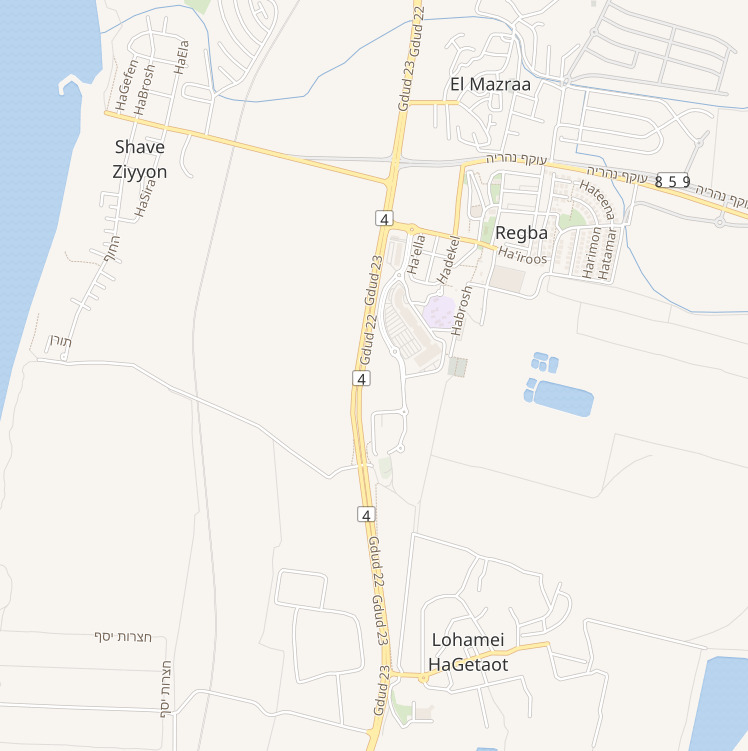
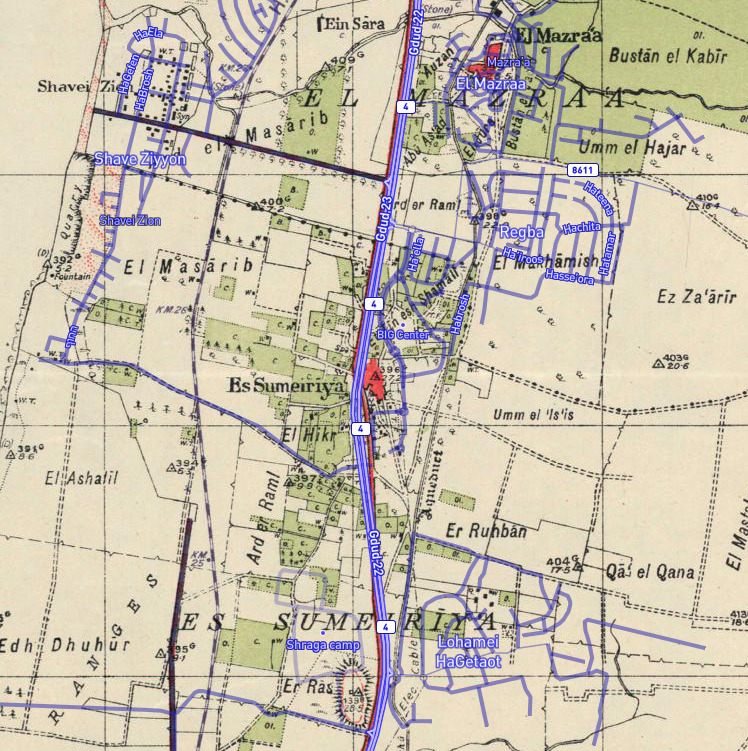
- 1870s map 1940s map modern map 1940s with modern overlay map A series of historical maps of the area around Al-Sumayriyya (click the buttons)

- Location within Mandatory Palestine
- Coordinates: 32°58′22″N 35°05′36″E
- Palestine grid: 159/264
- Geopolitical entity: Mandatory Palestine
- Subdistrict: Acre
- Date of depopulation: 14 May 1948

Area
  - Total: 8,542 dunams (8.542 km^{2}; 3.298 sq mi)

Population (1945)
  - Total: 760
- Cause(s) of depopulation: Military assault by Yishuv forces
- Current Localities: Regba, Lohamei HaGeta'ot, Shomrat

Al-Sumayriyya (Arabic: السُميريه, Katasir in Canaanite times, Someleria during Crusader rule), was a Palestinian village located six kilometers north of Acre that was depopulated after it was captured by the Israel Defense Forces during the 1948 Arab-Israeli War. The ruins of the village are today in the outskirts of the Israeli moshav of Regba.

== History ==
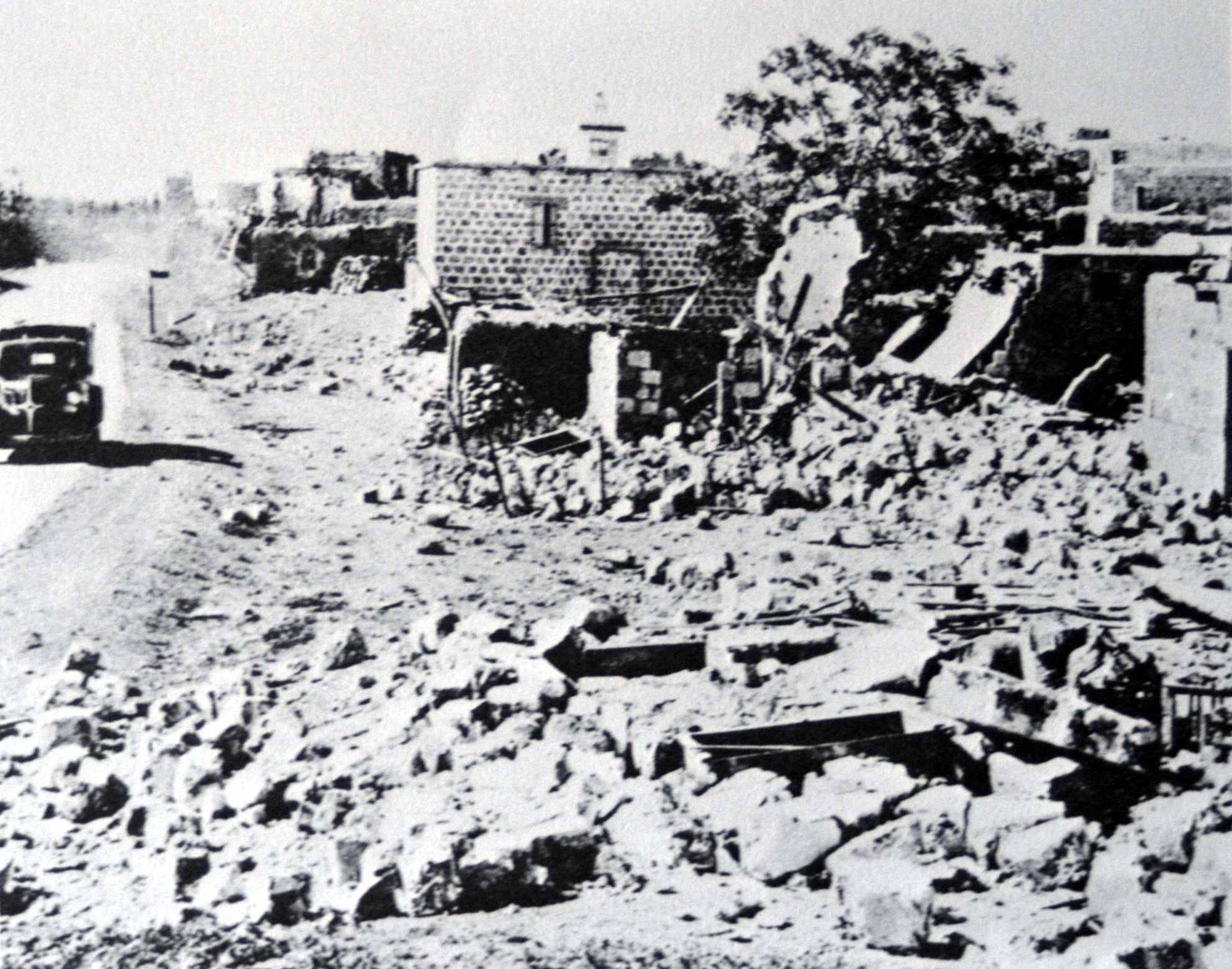
al-Sumayriyya, 1948

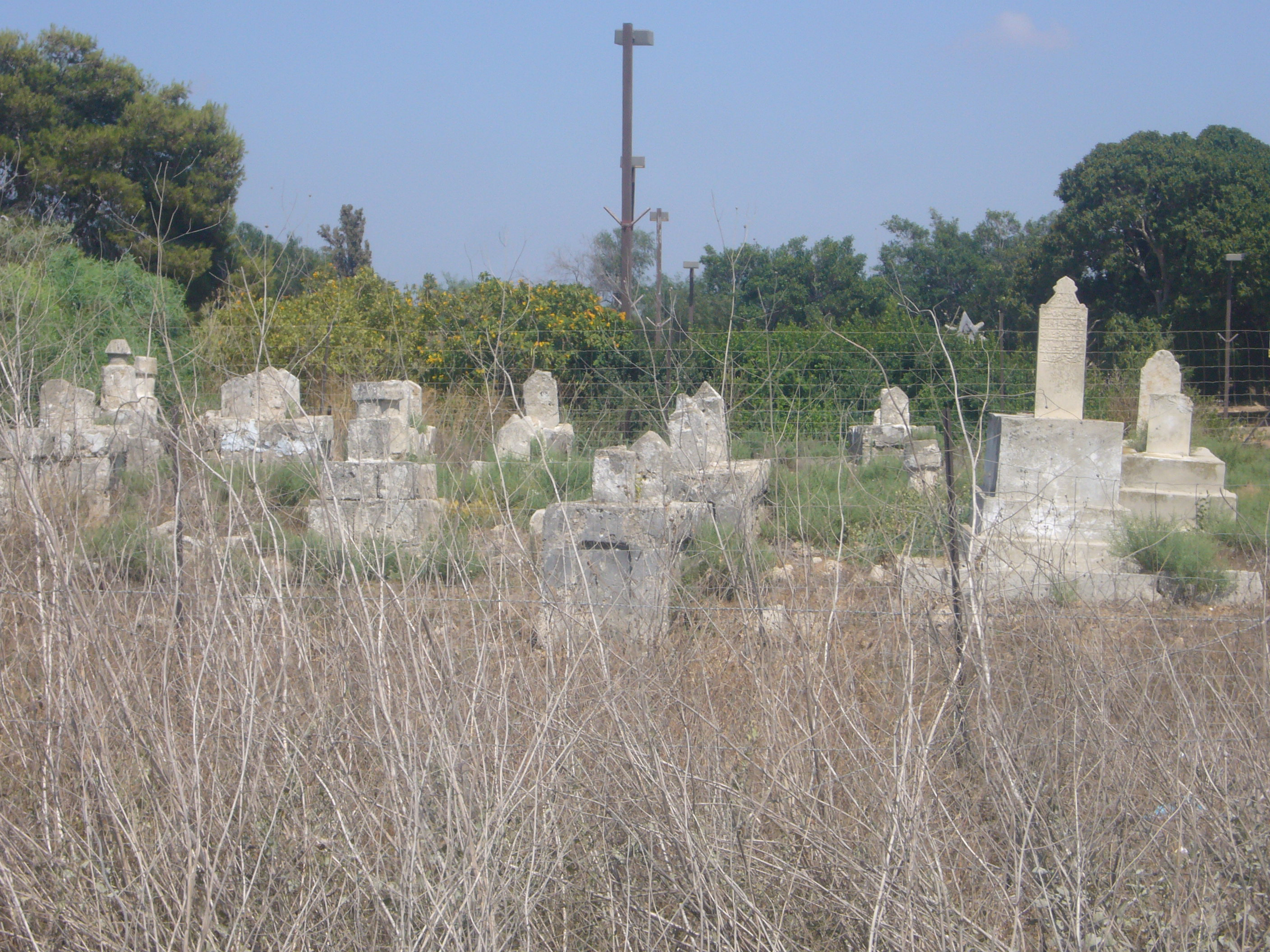
Al-Sumayriyya's old cemetery, July 2008

Tall al-Sumayriyya contains carved stones, a mosaic floor, tombs, columns, and stone capitals. Khirbat Abu 'Ataba has an Islamic shrine and ceramic fragments.

In the Crusader era, it was mentioned in 1277 under the name of Somelaria. At the time, the village belonged to the Templars. In the hudna of 1283 between Al Mansur Qalawun and the Crusaders, Al-Sumayriyya was still under Crusader rule while in 1291 it had come under Mamluk control.

A building with a court-yard, measuring 60,5 by 57 meters, dating from the Crusader era, has been noted in the village, and a 13th-century glass-factory has been excavated.

=== Ottoman era ===
It was mentioned in the Ottoman defter for the year 1555-6, named Summayriyah, located in the Nahiya of Akka of the Liwa of Safad, and with its land designated as Sahi land, that is, land belonging to the Sultan.

In 1738 Richard Pococke passed by the place, which he called Semmars. He thought the name came from "St. Mary's", and noted the remains of a wall of hewn stone, which he thought had belonged to a convent.

A map by Pierre Jacotin from Napoleon's invasion of 1799 showed the place, named as El Esmerieh.

In 1875 Victor Guérin found the village had 400 Muslim inhabitants. In 1881, the PEF's Survey of Western Palestine described the place as a village of "mud and stone houses, containing about 200 [..] Moslems, situated on the plain, surrounded by a few clumps of olives and figs and arable land; two or three cisterns are in the village, the aqueduct near brings good water."

A population list from about 1887 showed the village to have about 270 inhabitants; all Muslims.

=== British Mandate era ===
In the 1922 census of Palestine conducted by the British Mandate authorities Semariyeh had a population of 307; 300 Muslims and 7 Christians, where all the Christians were Maronite. This had increased in the 1931 census to 392, 390 Muslims, 1 Christian and 1 Jew, in a total of 92 houses.

Al-Sumayriyya had an elementary school for boys, which was founded in 1943. In 1945, it had an enrollment of 60 students. One mosque which remains.

In 1944/1945 the village had a population of 760 Muslims, with a total of 8,542 dunams of land. Of this, 6,854 dunams were allocated to grain crops; 354 dunams were irrigated or planted with orchards, while 28 dunams were built-up (urban) land.

=== 1948, and aftermath ===
At the beginning of 1945, al-Sumayriyya's 760 inhabitants were all Arab Muslims. The inhabitants fled as a result of the 14 May 1948 assault on the village by the Carmeli Brigade during Operation Ben-Ami, one day before the official outbreak of the 1948 Arab-Israeli War. The village - along with neighbouring al-Bassa and al-Zib which were also captured in the offensive - was subsequently destroyed, except its mosque.

Lohamei HaGeta'ot and Shomrat are both on village land. Morris writes that Bustan HaGalil was built near its site, however, Khalidi writes that Bustan HaGalil is on the land of Al-Manshiyya. Shavey Tziyon and Regba are close to the northern borders of Al-Sumayriyya, but were established on land that used to belong to Mazra'a.

== See also ==
- Depopulated Palestinian locations in Israel

== Bibliography ==
- Barag, Dan (1979). "A new source concerning the ultimate borders of the Latin Kingdom of Jerusalem". Israel Exploration Journal. 29 (3/4): 197–217. JSTOR 27925726.
- Barron, J. B., ed. (1923). Palestine: Report and General Abstracts of the Census of 1922. Government of Palestine.
- Conder, C.R.; Kitchener, H.H. (1881). The Survey of Western Palestine: Memoirs of the Topography, Orography, Hydrography, and Archaeology. Vol. 1. London: Committee of the Palestine Exploration Fund.
- Department of Statistics (1945). Village Statistics, April, 1945. Government of Palestine.
- Guérin, V. (1880). Description Géographique Historique et Archéologique de la Palestine (in French). Vol. 3: Galilee, pt. 2. Paris: L'Imprimerie Nationale.
- Hadawi, S. (1970). Village Statistics of 1945: A Classification of Land and Area ownership in Palestine. Palestine Liberation Organization Research Center. Archived from the original on 2018-12-08.
- Karmon, Y. (1960). "An Analysis of Jacotin's Map of Palestine" (PDF). Israel Exploration Journal. 10 (3, 4): 155–173, 244–253. Archived from the original (PDF) on 2017-12-01.
- Khalidi, W. (1992). All That Remains: The Palestinian Villages Occupied and Depopulated by Israel in 1948. Washington D.C.: Institute for Palestine Studies. ISBN 0-88728-224-5.
- Mills, E., ed. (1932). Census of Palestine 1931. Population of Villages, Towns and Administrative Areas. Jerusalem: Government of Palestine.
- Morris, B. (2004). The Birth of the Palestinian Refugee Problem Revisited. Cambridge University Press. ISBN 978-0-521-00967-6.(pp. 229,252253,314,347,350,376,380,381)
- Palmer, E.H. (1881). The Survey of Western Palestine: Arabic and English Name Lists Collected During the Survey by Lieutenants Conder and Kitchener, R. E. Transliterated and Explained by E.H. Palmer. Committee of the Palestine Exploration Fund.
- Pococke, R. (1745). A description of the East, and some other countries. Vol. 2. London: Printed for the author, by W. Bowyer. (Pococke, 1745, vol 2, p. 54; cited in Pringle, 2009, p. 233
- Pringle, D. (1997). Secular buildings in the Crusader Kingdom of Jerusalem: an archaeological Gazetter. Cambridge University Press. ISBN 9780521460101.
- Pringle, D. (1998). The Churches of the Crusader Kingdom of Jerusalem: L-Z (excluding Tyre). Vol. II. Cambridge University Press. ISBN 0-521-39037-0.
- Pringle, D. (2009). The Churches of the Crusader Kingdom of Jerusalem: The cities of Acre and Tyre with Addenda and Corrigenda to Volumes I-III. Vol. IV. Cambridge University Press. ISBN 978-0-521-85148-0. p. 233
- Raynaud, G., ed. (1887). Les gestes des Chiprois: recueil de chroniques françaises écrites en Orient au XIIIe & XVIe ... (in French). Vol. 5. Geneve: J.G. Fick.
- Rhode, H. (1979). Administration and Population of the Sancak of Safed in the Sixteenth Century. Columbia University. Archived from the original on 2020-03-01.
- Röhricht, R. (1887). "Studien zur mittelalterlichen Geographie und Topographie Syriens". Zeitschrift des Deutschen Palästina-Vereins. 10: 195–344. p. 251
- Röhricht, R. (1893). (RRH) Regesta regni Hierosolymitani (MXCVII-MCCXCI) (in Latin). Berlin: Libraria Academica Wageriana.
- Schumacher, G. (1888). "Population list of the Liwa of Akka". Quarterly Statement - Palestine Exploration Fund. 20: 169–191.
- Tal, D. (2004). War in Palestine, 1948: Strategy and Diplomacy. Routledge. ISBN 0-7146-5275-X.
