= Regba =

Regba: רֶגְבָּה (Hebrew)
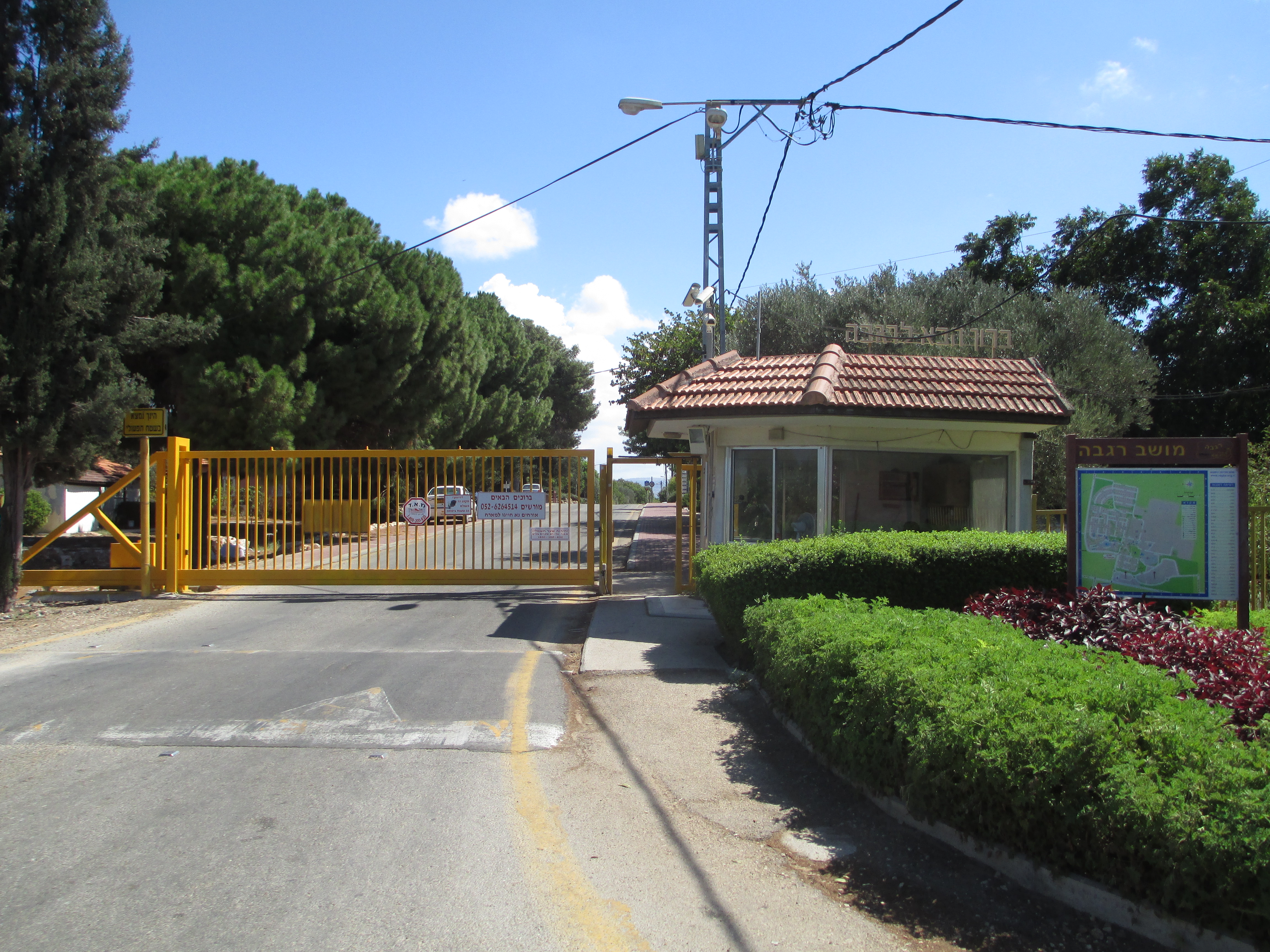
- Entrance to Regba

- Location within Northwest Israel Location within Israel
- Coordinates: 32°58′36″N 35°5′56″E
- Country: Israel
- District: Northern
- Subdistrict: Acre
- Council: Mateh Asher
- Affiliation: Kibbutz Movement
- Founded: 1946
- Founder: British Army veterans
- Population (2024): 1,057

Regba (Hebrew: רֶגְבָּה) is a moshav shitufi in northern Israel. Located near Nahariya, it falls under the jurisdiction of Mateh Asher Regional Council. In 2024 it had a population of 1,057.

== History ==
Regba was established in 1946 next to the Palestinian Arab villages of Al-Sumayriyya and Mazra'a, by a group of veterans of the British Army from Germany, the Netherlands and English speaking countries. It was originally established as a kibbutz and became a moshav shitufi in 1949. The name is symbolic, as in "Regev" ("lump of earth").

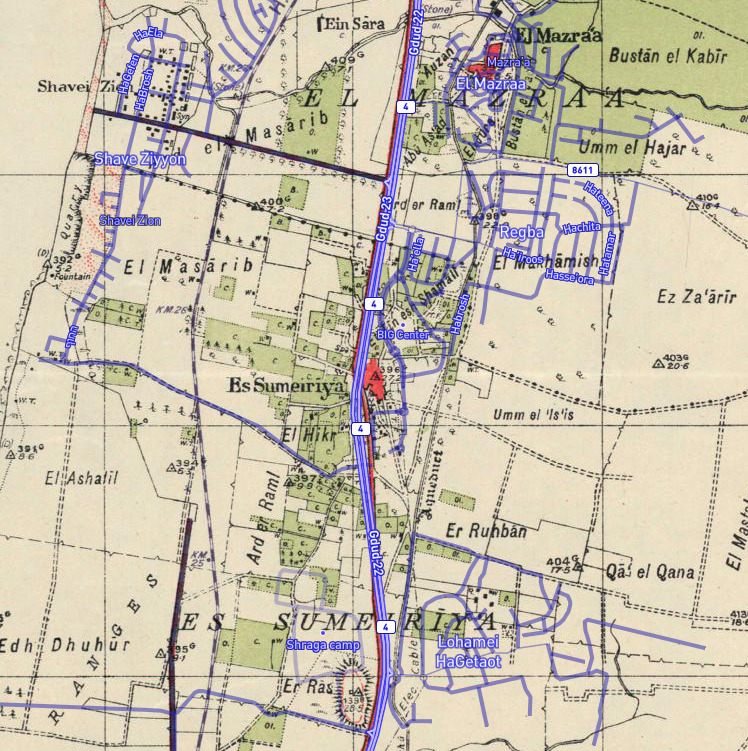
The area in a 1940s Survey of Palestine map, with the modern locations overlaid. The two pre-existing villages of Al-Sumayriyya and Mazra'a can be seen

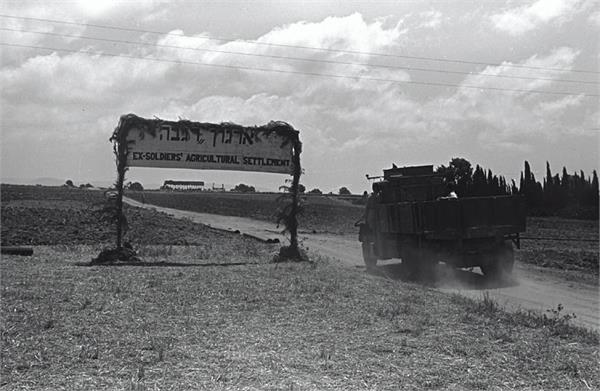
Regba Aliyah 18 August 1946

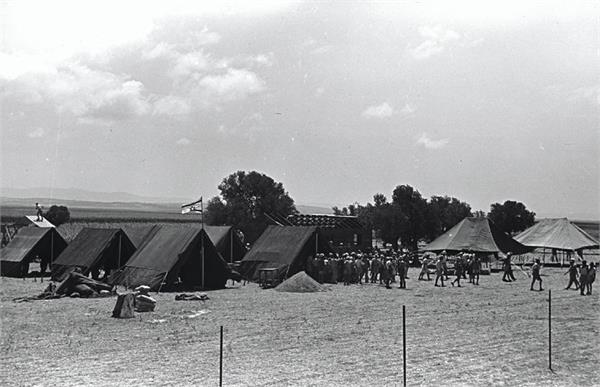
Regba 18 August 1946

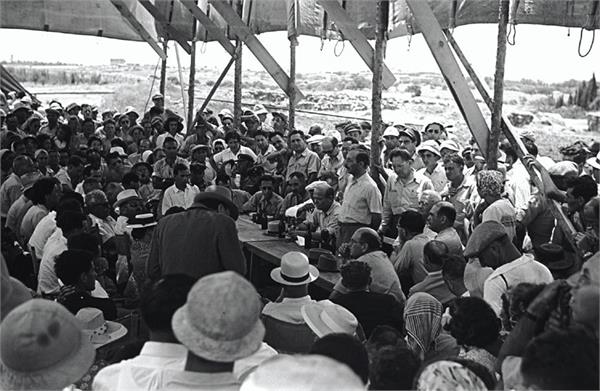
Regba 18 August 1946

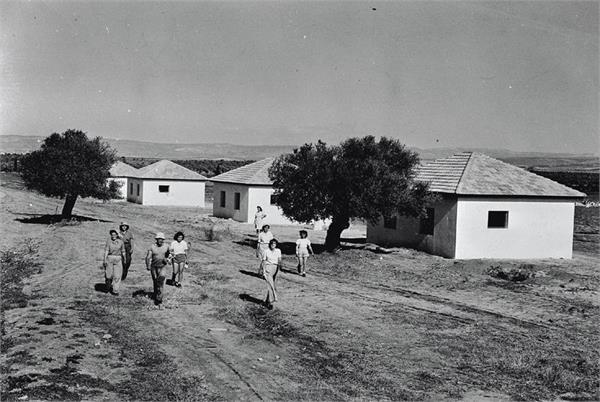
Regba 1947

== Landmarks ==
Regba Center for Olive and Oil, originally located at the Shemen factory in Haifa Bay, documents the history of the country's olive industry.

== Notable residents ==
- Eyal Berkovic (born 1972), football player
