= Shomrat gang rape =

1988 gang rape in Shomrat, Israel

- Shomrat gang rape (Northwest Israel) Location of Shomrat, Israel
- Location: 32°57′4″N 35°5′44″E; Shomrat, Israel
- Date: August 11–14, 1988
- Victim: Anonymous 14-year-old girl
- No. of participants: 11
- Convicted: 4

The Shomrat gang rape was a series of sexual assaults which occurred in August 1988 at the kibbutz of Shomrat in Israel. The assaults were committed at various locations in and around the kibbutz and continued for a week. The victim was a 14-year-old girl from the kibbutz. The crime was committed by 11 rapists, including both teenage boys and adults, some of them members of Kibbutz Shomrat. The crime led to a change in Israeli law's treatment of rape, which now states that a man must seek and verify the express consent of a woman before having sexual contact with her and that if such permission is not given, it is rape.

At first, the Haifa District Court Prosecutor's office decided to close the file “for lack of public interest” because the victim was unable to testify in court. Only after a public struggle were indictments filed against seven rape suspects in the Haifa District court; their trial began in June 1991. They were acquitted, but the state filed an appeal to the Supreme Court against four of them - Ofir Barry, Nadav Biton, Tzafir Tzavison, and Arik Chazon. All four were subsequently convicted and sentenced to prison terms of up to a year and a half.

== Incident ==
The perpetrators were aged 16 and a half to 18 and a half. Three of them were students at the regional school Ashrat in Kibbutz Evron, near Nahariya: two boys were from Kibbutz Shomrat, one from nearby Kibbutz Sa'ar, and two of the accused were from Nahariya. Two boys were from Yavne and Rishon LeZion and were staying at Kibbutz Shomrat.

The rape was committed between August 11 and 14, 1988. First, Ofir Barry, a kibbutz member, convinced the victim to join the ride in the car of his friends, Nadav and Eli Biton, residents of Nahariya. The boys drove the victim by car to the kibbutz fields, where they raped her for the first time. The next day, when she was sitting with other boys and girls near the Youth Society building, Barry called her, but she refused to come. In response, he said he would tell everyone what happened the night before. Since she was afraid, she joined him and another boy, a kibbutz member. The two tried to convince her to sleep with them, but she refused and went back to her room. There came the boy she met earlier, who tried to convince her that he would protect her and not let others touch her, but after sleeping with her, with her consent, he informed his friends that "there is a woman who is fucking", thus encouraging the continuation of the acts of rape. This boy was not accused of rape since she slept with him consensually. As part of the events, there were cases where more than one boy raped her simultaneously. The acts of rape continued in the victim's room, in the kibbutz's furniture factory, in the Moshav Bostan HaGalil and on the beach in Acre.

According to the testimonies of all those involved, the sexual relations were initiated by the group of boys. She claimed that the acts were done against her will and that she made threats against the perpetrators. According to the boys, the acts were consensual without protest or threats. After they began to use physical and not only verbal violence against her, the victim complained to the kibbutz nurse and told her about the acts. The nurse provided her with medical treatment but avoided reporting the case to the authorities. After two days, the victim also told her mother about the acts, who convinced her to file a complaint with the police five days after the end of the acts of rape.

After the affair was revealed, the four kibbutz members were removed from it for six months by a judge's decision and stayed in other kibbutzim. The kibbutz decided to finance their legal defense. After their return to the kibbutz, the victim's family left the kibbutz.

== Closing the file ==
On August 22, the three perpetrators who were members of the kibbutz were arrested. Two days later three others who were not residents of the kibbutz were arrested as well. Later, two of her brothers, in whose car the girl was driven, were also located and arrested. The police recommended prosecuting nine of the eleven boys who were involved in the case, but lawyer Lili Burishansky, the Haifa district attorney, caused a public uproar in March 1990 when she recommended that they not be prosecuted "for lack of public interest". In response to the public uproar caused by her decision, she said that she used legal wording that is usually used when the suspects are minors. The reason given after the case was under discussion at the prosecutor's office for about a year was: "Following a psychological opinion, it was determined that the girl cannot testify because the testimony could cause her harm and impair her chances of rehabilitation. The district attorney's office reviewed the case, and for more than a year, the attorney's office-maintained contact with the psychologist, to check whether the complainant was able to testify. Because the complainant was unable to testify, it was found that there was insufficient evidence regarding a large part of the complaint, and the Haifa District Attorney's Office had to close the case."

Borishansky's decision to close the case provoked criticism from many jurists, who claimed that, at the very least, those involved could have been put on trial for an offense involving a minor since they admitted to having sex with her. The Aid Center for Victims of Sexual Assault, the Naamat Organization, journalists, and lawyer Daniela Gerzolin helped the girl, and a struggle began to change the decision and bring justice to the case. At the same time, other similar cases were closed for similar reasons, but their details were not disclosed.

== Reopening the file ==
In August 1990, the victim's family appealed to the Haifa District Attorney's Office with a request to examine the possibility of reopening the investigation file and prosecuting the suspects in the act. In addition, a psychological opinion was submitted that the victim could testify against the defendants. On September 23, 1990, the prosecutor's office finally decided to prosecute seven of those involved in the case. Their Haifa trial at the District Court began on June 2, 1991. In practice, only six defendants were prosecuted after a seventh defendant left Israel with his family before the trial began. The accused at this stage were mostly soldiers in regular service. During the trial, the kibbutz hired a public relations company to clear itself of the incident; after the media exposure damaged its image, the kibbutz wanted to emphasize that the trial is not on the kibbutz itself, and that only two of the seven defendants are members of the kibbutz.

== Reactions ==
The Israeli national press frequently refers to the case of rape in Shomrat and presents it as indicative of conditions within the community. While the local press minimizes its coverage and presents such incidents as abnormal and out of the ordinary.

== In popular culture ==
- The play "Game in the Backyard" by playwright and theater director Edna Mazia was inspired by the case, even before the appeal to the Supreme Court. It premiered at the Haifa Theatre in June 1993, directed by Oded Kotler, who also initiated its writing.
- Dan Almagor, the author of the song "When you say no", which was quoted in the verdict, changed the words of one of the stanzas following the incident: "When she says 'no' - that's what she means. That's what she means when she says 'no!', that's why the 'no!' Hers is final, absolute. Only she decides, not any court".
