= Shomrat =

Kibbutz in Mateh Asher

Shomrat: שָׁמְרַת (Hebrew)
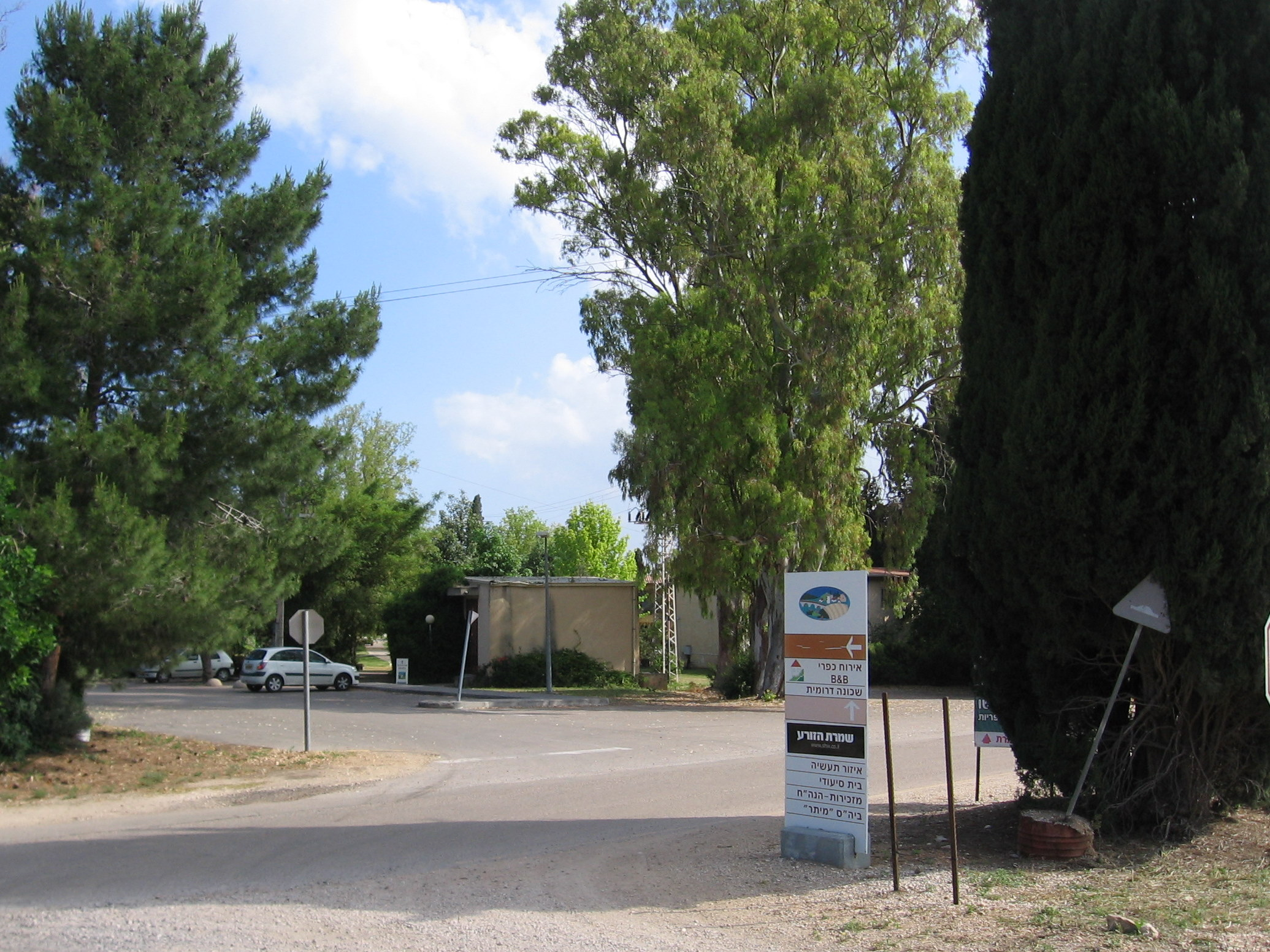

- Location within Northwest Israel
- Coordinates: 32°57′4″N 35°5′44″E
- Country: Israel
- District: Northern
- Subdistrict: Acre
- Council: Mateh Asher
- Affiliation: Kibbutz Movement
- Founded: 29 May 1948
- Founder: Czechoslovak, Hungarian and Romanian Hashomer Hatzair Members
- Population (2024): 727
- Website: www.at-shomrat.com

Shomrat (Hebrew: שָׁמְרַת) is a kibbutz in northern Israel. Located in the western Galilee on the coastal highway just north of Acre, it falls under the jurisdiction of Mateh Asher Regional Council. In 2024 it had a population of 727.

== History ==
The kibbutz was established on 29 May 1948 by Hashomer Hatzair members from Czechoslovakia, Hungary and Romania on land located near the depopulated Palestinian villages of al-Manshiyya, north of the village site, and al-Sumayriyya. Some of the founders had fought with the partisan forces against the Nazis in Europe, while the majority came out of various Nazi concentration camps. Most of the kibbutz founders made their way to Palestine as part of the Aliyah Bet organization, and were consequently interned in DP camps in Cyprus. The founders originally resided in the agricultural experimental government station near Acre, and moved to the permanent location in 1950.

Designer Tzuri Gueta attended secondary school at Shomrat, and his first job was in the kibbutz knitting factory.

In August of 1988, a gang rape occurred in the kibbutz resulting in changes to Israeli law on sexual assault.

== Economy ==
In 1993, the kibbutz opened a cotton spinning and knitting factory.

Following the collapse of Shomrat's industrial enterprises at the end of the 1990s, Shomrat reorganized itself on the renewed kibbutz model, instituting a differential pay scale and deep privatization of kibbutz services.
