= Al-Manshiyya, Acre =

al-Manshiyya المنشيه
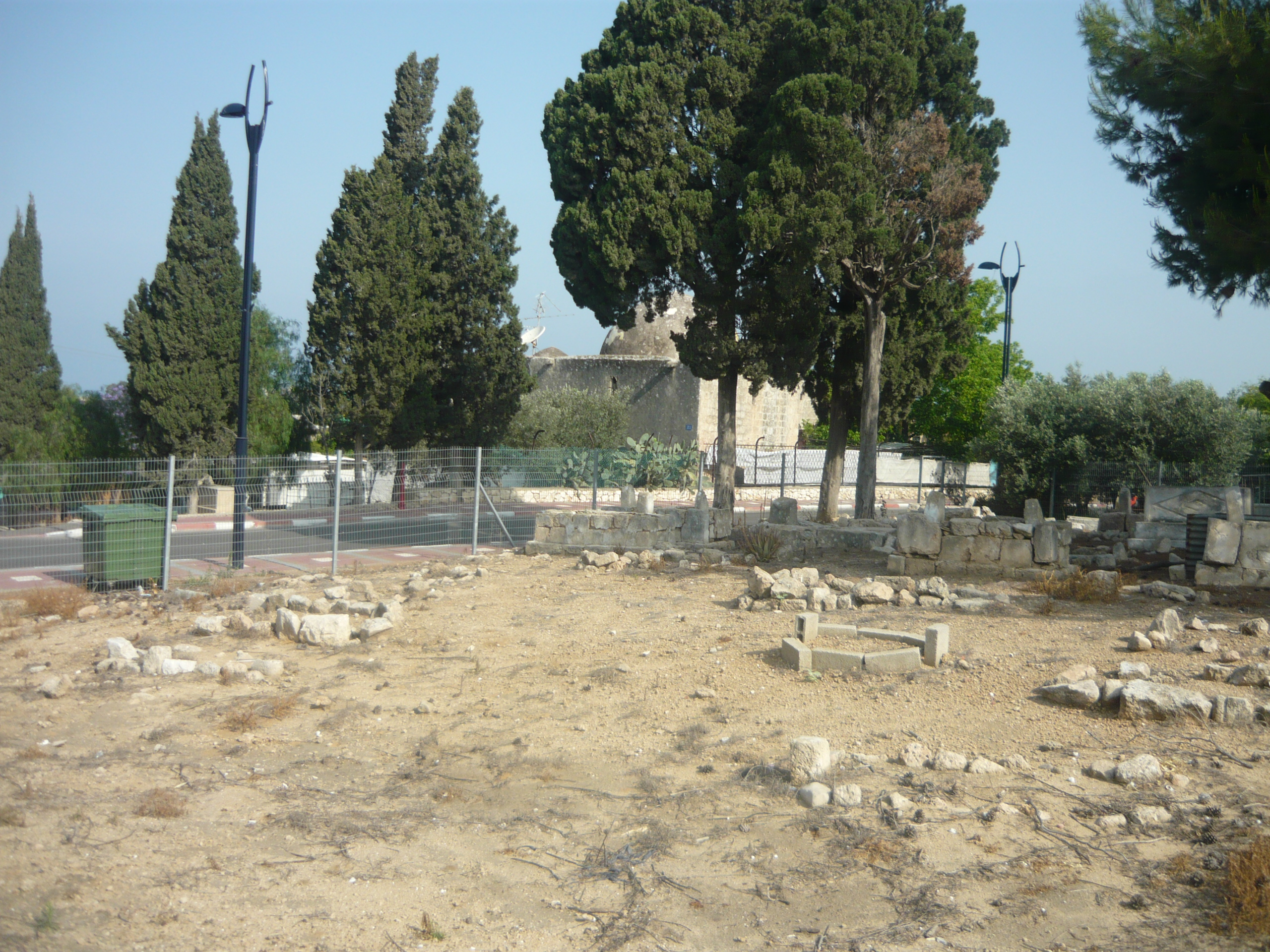
- Ancient tomb of Abu Ataba, now the residential home of a Jewish family.

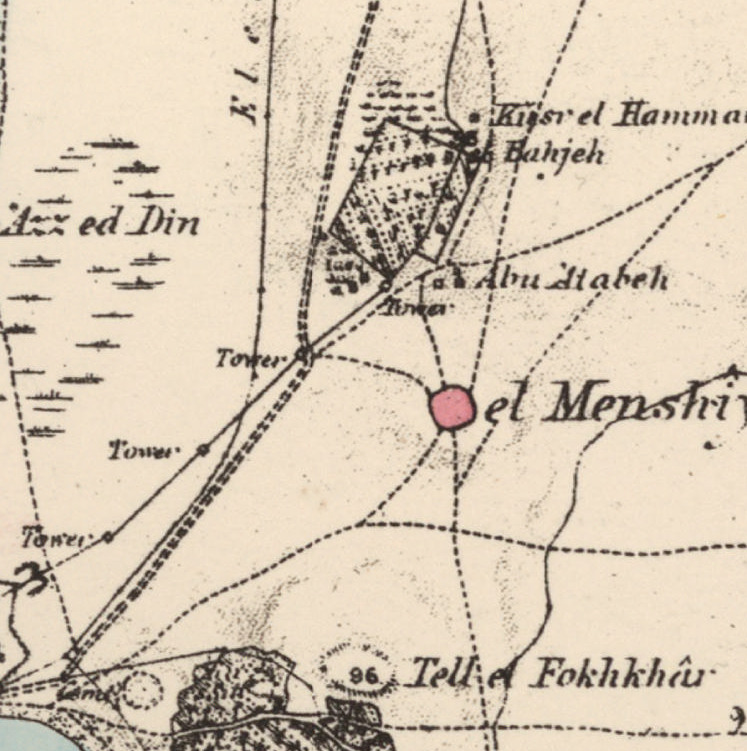
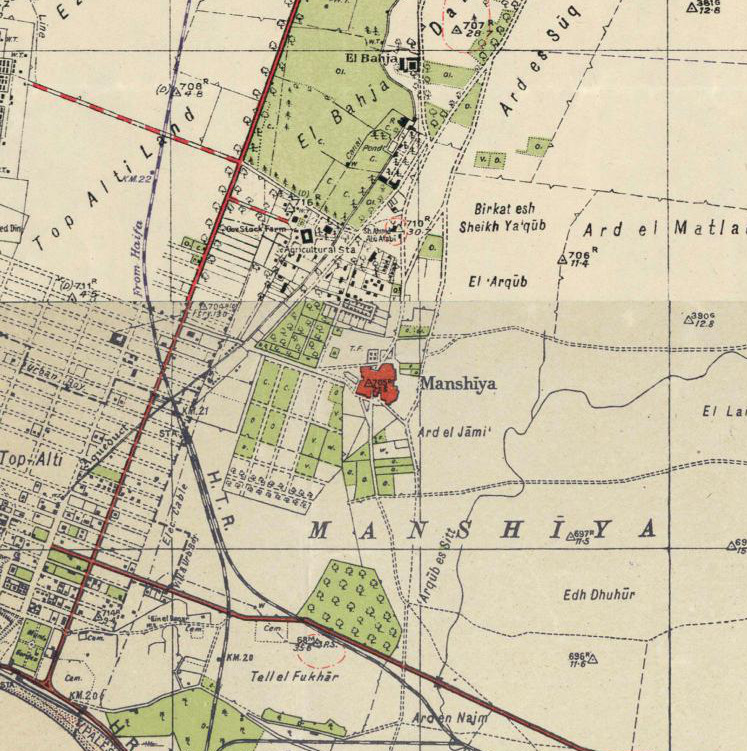
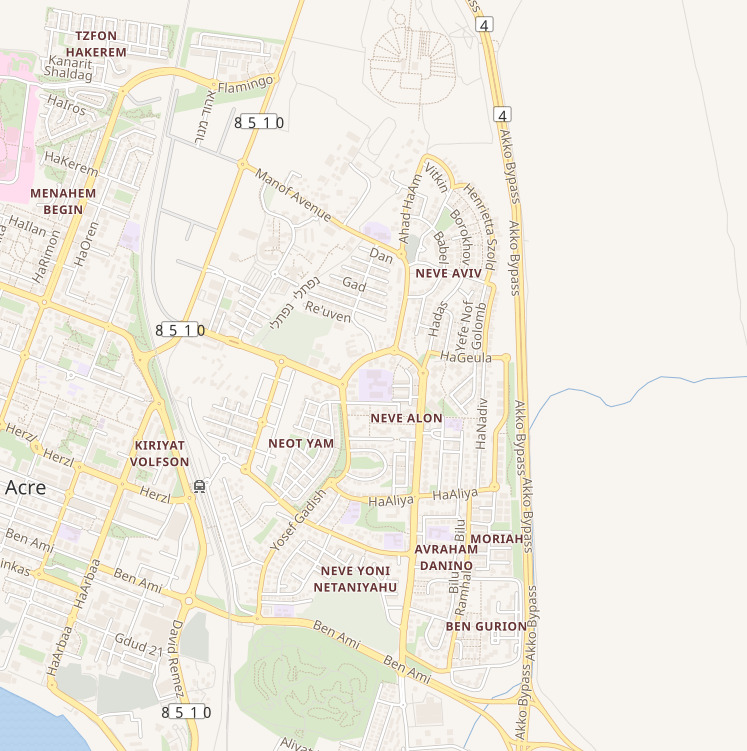
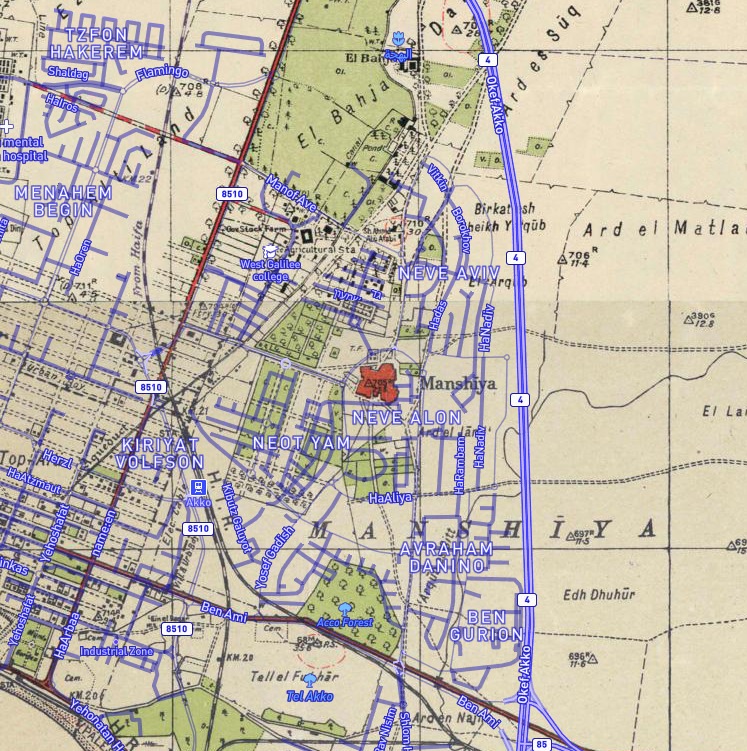
- 1870s map 1940s map modern map 1940s with modern overlay map A series of historical maps of the area around Al-Manshiyya, Acre (click the buttons)

- Location within Mandatory Palestine
- Coordinates: 32°55′56″N 35°05′26″E
- Palestine grid: 159/260
- Geopolitical entity: Mandatory Palestine
- Subdistrict: Acre
- Date of depopulation: 14 May 1948 (Operation Ben-Ami)

Area
  - Total: 14,886 dunams (14.886 km^{2}; 5.748 sq mi)

Population (1945)
  - Total: 810
- Cause(s) of depopulation: Military assault by Yishuv forces
- Current Localities: Shomrat, Bustan HaGalil

Al-Manshiyya (Arabic: المنشية), was a Palestinian village with a Muslim orphanage and a mosque known as the mosque of Abu 'Atiyya, which is still standing.

The area just north of the village was a garden planted by Sulayman Pasha, who was the ruler of Acre in the early 19th century, named Arabic: قصر بهجي, Qasr Bahjī, mansion of delight; today this is known as the shrine of Bahá'u'lláh, who was the founder of the Baháʼí Faith.

== History ==
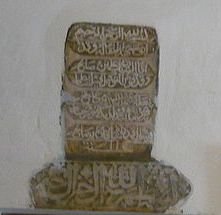
Inscription above the entrance to the tomb of Abu Ataba

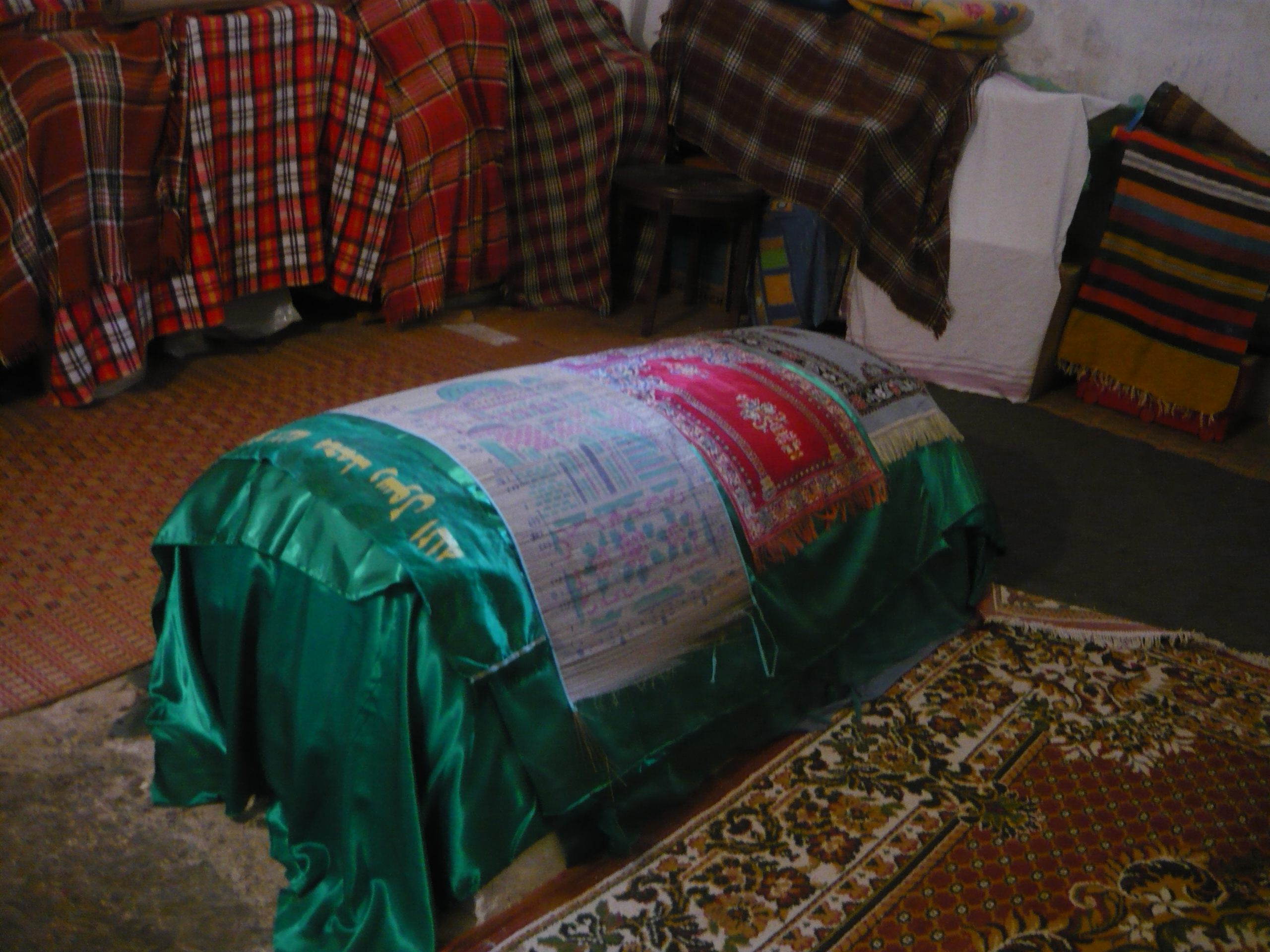
Tomb of Abu Ataba

Five graves were excavated in al-Manshiyya in 1955–56; the earliest dated from the thirteenth century BC.

The people of Al-Manshiyya believed that the village was established in the aftermath of the Crusades, and the original inhabitants were brought to the area from North Africa by the Mamluks to populate the area. However, the village must have disintegrated subsequently, as it is not mentioned in the 1596 census. The local shrine of Abu Atabi has a construction text dating it to 1140 AH (1727–28 CE). It is probably it Richard Pococke refers to when he passed by in 1738: "On the highest ground of it are the ruins of a very strong square tower, and near it, is a mosque, a tower, and other great buildings; the place is called Abouotidy, from a Sheik who was buried there." In 1760, Giovanni Mariti called the place Bahattbe: "situated on a small eminence, which contains the ruins of an ancient temple, employed as a place of worship both by the Turks and Christians, but at different periods. Some paces further is a mosque, remarkable on account of its burying-ground, in which was interred a prodigious number of infidels, who perished under the walls of Acre."

A map from 1799 showed the place as an "uninhabited ruin", while Guérin, who visited in 1875, observed that the village is "newly founded". In 1881, the PEF's Survey of Western Palestine (SWP) described the village of Al-Manshiyya as being situated on a plain, surrounded by arable land, with houses built of stone and adobe. It had a population of about 150.

A population list from about 1887 showed that Kiryet el Menshiyeh had about 400 inhabitants, all Muslim.

=== British Mandate era ===
In the 1922 census of Palestine conducted by the British Mandate authorities Al Manshiyeh had a population of 371; all Muslims, increasing in the 1931 census to 460, still all Muslims, in a total of 132 houses.

In the 1945 statistics, Al-Manshiyya had 810 Muslim inhabitants and 270 Jewish inhabitants, with a total of 14,886 dunums (3,678 acres) of land according to an official land and population survey. The economy of the village was based on agriculture. In 1944/45 253 dunams was used for citrus and bananas, 10,818 dunams were allotted to cereals, 619 dunams were irrigated or used for orchards, while 27 dunams were built-up (urban) land.

=== 1948 and aftermath ===
The villagers, who were farmers, lived peacefully and had significant interaction with their Jewish neighbors. But the fighting in Acre, and later, the Deir Yassin massacre, frightened them. The village was first drawn into the 1948 Arab–Israeli War on 6 February 1948. On that day a number of armed Jews, using automatic weapons and Sten guns, attacked the village. They were driven back by village defenders.

Manshiyya was captured by on 14 May 1948 during Operation Ben-Ami. One villager recalled that the dawn attack came from the hill overlooking the village. The villagers, "with bullets whizzing over their heads", ran towards the east "because all other sides were surrounded by the Jews". When they returned to remove the dead bodies, they found the village strewn with mines. One former villager recounted that her father returned to Al-Manshiyya about 10 days after the attack and found it had been razed. On 16 June 1948, David Ben-Gurion mentioned Manshiyya as one of the villages Israel had destroyed.

Following the war the area was incorporated into the State of Israel. Two new villages, Shomrat and Bustan HaGalil, were established in 1948 on village land, north of the village site. The site is now part of the city of Acre.

According to the Palestinian historian Walid Khalidi, the remaining structures on the village land were in 1992: "The Baha'i [sic] shrine, the mosque, the Islamic school for orphans, and a few houses still stand; the rest of the village is gone. The shrine is a handsome, domed structure, the front wall and arched entrance of which are framed by prominent stone pillars. The mosque, a stone structure with a dome and vaulted ceilings, has been turned into a private home for a Jewish family. The former Islamic school for orphans is also inhabited. The cemetery is still visible but is not tended; it contains a tombstone that is inscribed in Turkish and dates to the eighteenth century. The al-Basha water canal, built with stone blocks, still exists, but is not functioning; the same is also true of an aqueduct."

Andrew Petersen, an archaeologist specializing in Islamic architecture, visited Al-Manshiyya in 1994. He found the mosque and shrine of Abu Atabi was still standing, though it has been turned into a residential complex since 1948. The prayer room functioned as a living room. An inscription in two parts was set above the doorway leading to the domed chamber containing the tomb. The date 1140 H (1727–28 C.E.) was still visible in the upper part, while the lower part, written in larger ornamental script might be earlier, possibly dating to Mamluk times. Abu Atabi is said locally to be a Muslim warrior from the time of the Crusades, killed during the siege of Acre.

== Bibliography ==
- Barron, J.B., ed. (1923). Palestine: Report and General Abstracts of the Census of 1922. Government of Palestine.
- Conder, C.R.; Kitchener, H.H. (1881). The Survey of Western Palestine: Memoirs of the Topography, Orography, Hydrography, and Archaeology. Vol. 1. London: Committee of the Palestine Exploration Fund.
- Esber, R.M. (2008). Under the Cover of War, The Zionist Expulsions of the Palestinians. Arabicus Books & Media. ISBN 9780981513171.
- Government of Palestine, Department of Statistics (1945). Village Statistics, April, 1945.
- Guérin, V. (1880). Description Géographique Historique et Archéologique de la Palestine (in French). Vol. 3: Galilee, pt. 2. Paris: L'Imprimerie Nationale.
- Hadawi, S. (1970). Village Statistics of 1945: A Classification of Land and Area ownership in Palestine. Palestine Liberation Organization Research Center. Archived from the original on 8 December 2018.
- Karmon, Y. (1960). "An Analysis of Jacotin's Map of Palestine" (PDF). Israel Exploration Journal. 10 (3, 4): 155–173, 244–253. Archived from the original (PDF) on 22 December 2019.
- Khalidi, W. (1992). All That Remains: The Palestinian Villages Occupied and Depopulated by Israel in 1948. Washington D.C.: Institute for Palestine Studies. ISBN 0-88728-224-5.
- Mariti, G. (1792). Travels Through Cyprus, Syria, and Palestine; with a General History of the Levant. Vol. 1. Dublin: P. Byrne.
- Mills, E., ed. (1932). Census of Palestine 1931. Population of Villages, Towns and Administrative Areas. Jerusalem: Government of Palestine.
- Morris, B. (2004). The Birth of the Palestinian Refugee Problem Revisited. Cambridge University Press. ISBN 978-0-521-00967-6.
- Palmer, E.H. (1881). The Survey of Western Palestine: Arabic and English Name Lists Collected During the Survey by Lieutenants Conder and Kitchener, R. E. Transliterated and Explained by E.H. Palmer. Committee of the Palestine Exploration Fund.
- Petersen, Andrew (2001). A Gazetteer of Buildings in Muslim Palestine (British Academy Monographs in Archaeology). Vol. I. Oxford University Press. ISBN 978-0-19-727011-0. Archived from the original on 29 May 2021.
- Pococke, R. (1745). A description of the East, and some other countries. Vol. 2. London: Printed for the author, by W. Bowyer.
- Pringle, D. (2009). The Churches of the Crusader Kingdom of Jerusalem The cities of Acre and Tyre with Addenda and Corrigenda to Volumes I-III. Vol. IV. Cambridge University Press. ISBN 978-0-521-85148-0.
- Sharon, M. (1997). Corpus Inscriptionum Arabicarum Palaestinae, A. Vol. 1. BRILL. ISBN 90-04-10833-5.
- Schumacher, G. (1888). "Population list of the Liwa of Akka". Quarterly Statement - Palestine Exploration Fund. 20: 169–191.
