= Mazra'a =

Arab town in northern Israel

Mazra'a: מַזְרַעָה; المزرعة
- Local council

Hebrew transcription(s)
  - ISO 259: Mazraˁa
  - Also spelled: "El Masar", "el Mezrah", Mazraʻih, Mazra'ah (official)
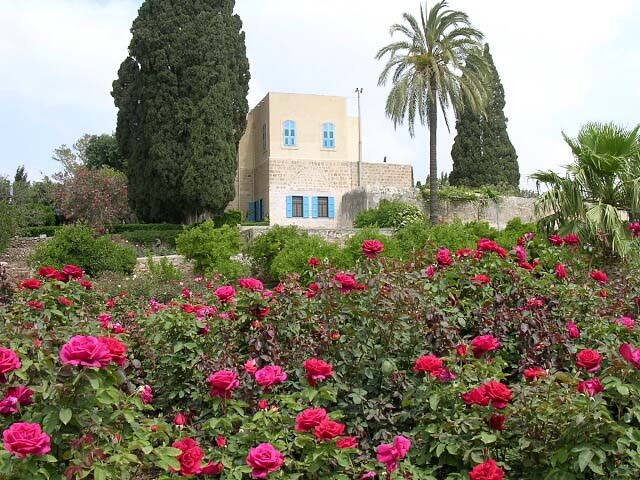
- House in Mazra'a, where Baha'u'llah lived 1877-1879. During 1932-1949 it was the home of General and Mrs. McNeill

- Location within Northwest Israel
- Coordinates: 32°58′59″N 35°5′51″E
- Grid position: 159/265 PAL
- Country: Israel
- District: Northern
- Subdistrict: Acre
- Natural Region: Nahariya

Government
  - Head of Municipality: Fuaad Awad (since 11/2013)

Population (2024)
  - Total: 3,920

Ethnicity
  - Arabs: 99.7%
  - Jews and others: 0.3%
- Name meaning: "The sown land"

Mazra'a (Arabic: المزرعة, Hebrew: מַזְרַעָה) is an Arab village and local council in northern Israel, situated between Acre and Nahariyya east of the Coastal Highway that runs along the Mediterranean coast. The local council was founded in 1896 and was incorporated into the Matte Asher Regional Council in 1982, before proclaiming itself an independent local council again in 1996. In 2024 it had a population of 3,920.

== Etymology ==
The Arabic al-mazra'a (p. mazari'), meaning "the sown land" or "farm", is a relatively common place name used to refer to cultivated lands outside of and dependent upon a primary settlement. In Crusader times, the village was known as le Mezera, according to Victor Guérin, while to Arabs in medieval times, it was known as al-Mazra'ah.

== History ==
In 1253, during the Crusader era, John Aleman, the Lord of Caesarea, leased Mazra'a to the Hospitalliers. Mazra'a is mentioned in the 1283 treaty between the Mamluk Sultan Qalaun and the Latin Kingdom of the Crusaders that controlled some territories in the Levant between 1099 and 1291. At the time of the treaty, Mazra'a was said to be still under Crusaders control. A 50 metre long wall to the west of the village centre, dating from the period, is thought to be the remnants of a fortified structure, mentioned by travel writers.

=== Ottoman Empire ===
Mazra'a was incorporated into the Ottoman Empire in 1517 with all of Palestine and in 1596, the tax registers listed Mazra'a as forming part of the nahiya (subdistrict) of Acca (Acre). The population is recorded as 27 Muslim households, and the villagers paid a fixed tax-rate of 25% on wheat, barley, cotton, in addition to "occasional revenues," goats, beehives, and water buffaloes; a total of 5,352 akçe. 14/24 of the revenue went to a waqf.

In the 1760s, Mazra'a was one of five villages in nahiya ("subdistrict") of Sahil Akka ("Acre coast"), which was under the direct rule of Daher al-Umar, the independent governor of the Galilee, as one of his Viftlik estates. As such, villagers were exempt from paying the usual Ottoman taxes. (Other Viftlik estates were Judayda, Samiriyya, al-Makr, and Julis.) After the death of Daher al-Umar in 1775, these villages were abandoned for a time, becoming known as places of lawlessness. Jezzar Pasha, the new governor of Acre, first returned the villages to their local sheiks, later dividing the income collected from them between himself and the local official.

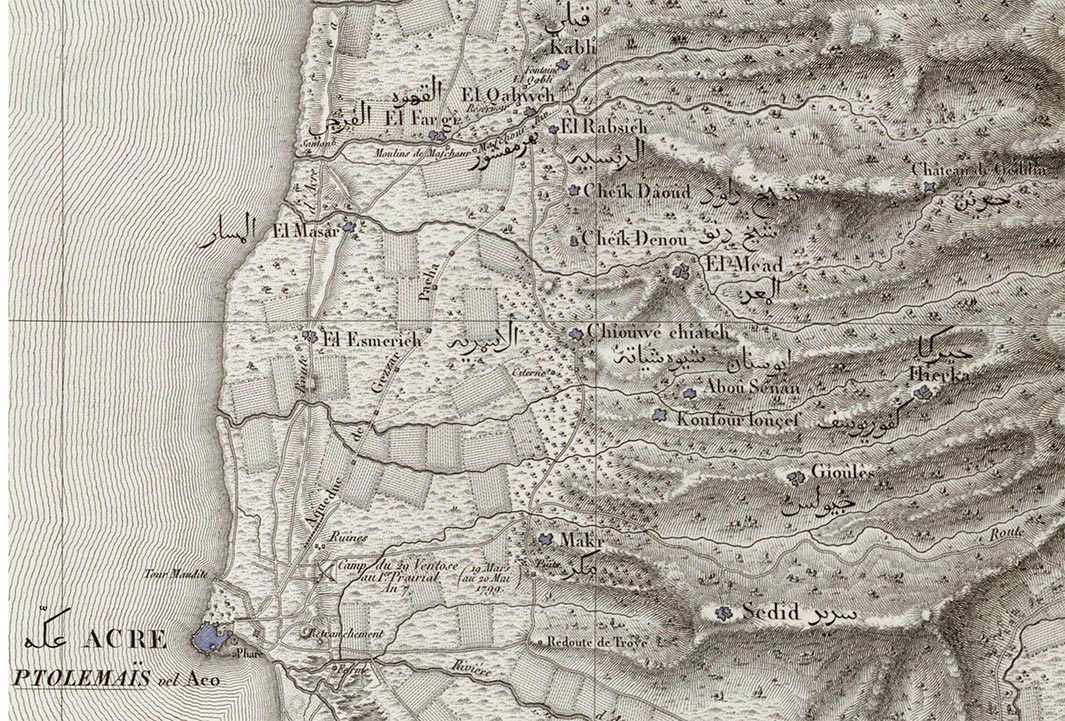
French map of the area, in 1799. Mazra'a is named "El Masar".

A map by Pierre Jacotin from Napoleon's invasion of 1799 showed the place, named as El Masar, while Napoleon Bonaparte himself described El-Mazara as a village of hundreds of Christians.

Victor Guérin, who visited the place in 1875, described Mezra'a as a village with a very small number of inhabitants, sepulchral grottos, cisterns, and a number of houses built of stone. The remains of a small castle fort are dated by him to the Middle Ages, if not earlier. Not far from it lay a number of columns that once ornamented a church. Close to the village was a khan said to have been built by Jezzar Pasha from which an aqueduct traveled through the valley under high arches.

In 1881, the PEF's Survey of Western Palestine (SWP) described the place as "A stone and conglomerate village, having 200 Moslems, situated on the plain, with olives, pomegranates, mulberries, and arable land; the aqueduct supplies good water."

A population list from about 1887 showed that el Mazra'h had about 185 inhabitants, all Muslim.

=== British Mandate ===
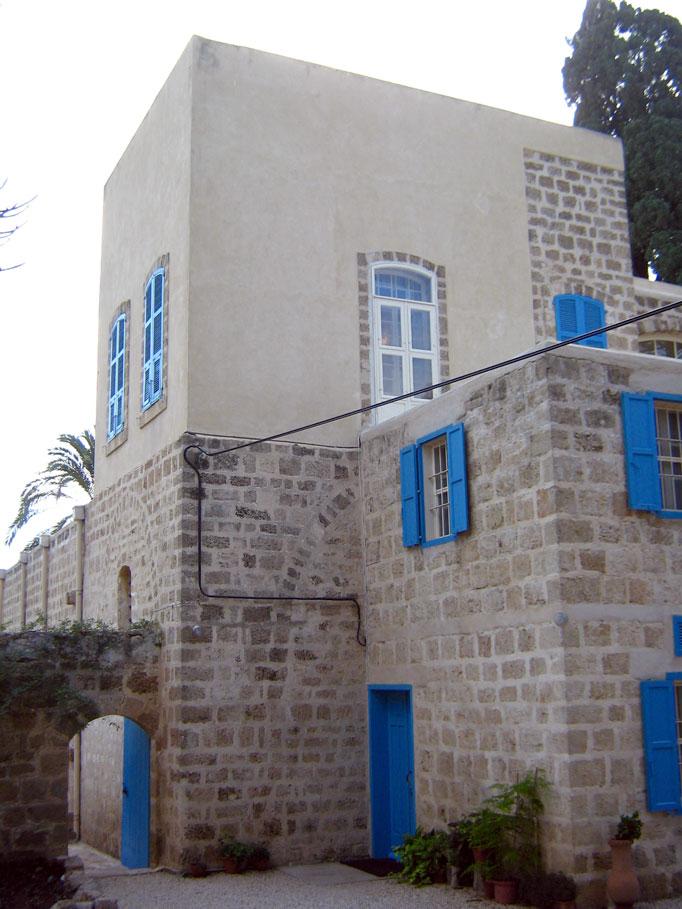
View of the Mansion of Mazra'a.

In the 1922 census of Palestine conducted by the British Mandate authorities Mazra'a had a population of 218; all Muslims, increasing in the 1931 census to a population of 320; 307 Muslims, 5 Christians and 8 Baháʼís, in a total of 78 houses.

In the 1945 statistics the population of Mazra was 430; 410 Muslims, 10 Christians and 10 classified as “others”. The land area was counted together with those of Shavei Zion, Ein Sara and Ga'aton and totalled 7,407 dunams of land according to an official land and population survey. A total of 737 dunams were for citrus and bananas, 1,631 dunams were plantations and irrigable land, 4,033 used for cereals, while 113 dunams were built-up (urban) land.

=== Israel ===
Mazra'a is one of the few Palestinian Arab coastal towns in the Western Galilee to have remained populated after the 1948 Arab–Israeli war. It served as a collection point for villagers expelled from the neighbouring villages of al-Zeeb and al-Bassa, assaulted and depopulated during Operation Ben-Ami beginning on 13 May 1948, two days before the official outbreak of the 1948 Arab-Israeli war. This caused the population to increase from 460 in 1946 to 620 in 1951.

The land area of 312 hectares owned by Mazra'a in 1945 was reduced to 30 hectares in 1962, for reasons that included an expropriation of 155 hectares by the Israeli government in 1953–54.

A new upscale neighborhood was built in Mazra'a in the early 2020s, east of the traditional town center. In 2025, Housing Minister Yitzhak Goldknopf inaugurated a new community center and library in the eastern neighborhood.

== Demographics ==
Historical population
Year	Pop.	±%
1972	1,400	—
1983	1,900	+35.7%
1995	3,100	+63.2%
2008	3,400	+9.7%
2022	3,772	+10.9%
2024	3,922	+4.0%

In 2022, 98% of the population was Muslim and 2% was Christian.

== Notable structures ==
=== Vaulted medieval building ===
The medieval building is located on the east side of the aqueduct, in the old part of the village. The masonry, composed of large (average size 1m x 0.5m) blocks, is consistent with a medieval date. Petersen, who visited the place in 1991 and 1994 and examined it, found two chambers, one long (11.4 x 6.35m) chamber aligned east-west, and one smaller chamber aligned north-south. Rock-cut troughs found in the smaller room indicated that it might have been a stable.

=== Khan al Waqif ===
The building is a square enclosure, located about 800 m. north of the village, and it is associated with the construction of the Kabri aqueduct at the beginning of the nineteenth century. On the NE and the NW corners of the courtyard are staircases leading to the flat roof. The south part of the building consists of a vaulted hall, with an arcade of six arches facing the courtyard.

=== Khan Evron ===
This building is located about 1 km north-east of the village, just south of the Kabri aqueduct. The design is very similar to the Khan al Waqif, and it is assumed that they date from the same age.

== Voting Patterns ==
In the 2026 election, 97 percent of voters in Mazra'a voted for the Arab parties, while 2 percent voted for the parties of the center-left coalition led by Gadi Eisenkot and 0.4 percent voted for the parties of the right-wing coalition led by Benjamin Netanyahu. Among the voters for the Arab parties, 69 percent voted for the Joint List, while 31 percent voted for Ra'am. Voter turnout increased 38 percent from the 2022 election.

== See also ==
- Arab localities in Israel
- Bahá'í World Centre buildings

== Bibliography ==
- Abassi, M. and Henry Near (2007). "The General and the Village: The 1948 War and its Aftermath seen from the Sidelines". Israel Affairs. 13: 24–54. doi:10.1080/13537120601063283. S2CID 144019162.
- Barag, Dan (1979). "A new source concerning the ultimate borders of the Latin Kingdom of Jerusalem". Israel Exploration Journal. 29 (3/4): 197–217. JSTOR 27925726.
- Barron, J.B., ed. (1923). Palestine: Report and General Abstracts of the Census of 1922. Government of Palestine.
- Cohen, Amnon (1973). Palestine in the Eighteenth Century: Patterns of Government and Administration. Jerusalem: Magnes Press, Hebrew University. ISBN 1-59045-955-5. p. 133-135, Cited in Petersen, 2001.
- Conder, C.R.; Kitchener, H.H. (1881). The Survey of Western Palestine: Memoirs of the Topography, Orography, Hydrography, and Archaeology. Vol. 1. London: Committee of the Palestine Exploration Fund.
- Delaville Le Roulx, J. (1883). Les archives, la bibliothèque et le trésor de l'Ordre de Saint-Jean de Jérusalem à Malte (in French and Latin). Paris: E. Leroux.
- Department of Statistics (1945). Village Statistics, April, 1945. Government of Palestine.
- Guérin, V. (1880). Description Géographique Historique et Archéologique de la Palestine (in French). Vol. 3: Galilee, pt. 2. Paris: L'Imprimerie Nationale.
- Hadawi, S. (1970). Village Statistics of 1945: A Classification of Land and Area ownership in Palestine. Palestine Liberation Organization Research Center.
- Hütteroth, W.-D.; Abdulfattah, K. (1977). Historical Geography of Palestine, Transjordan and Southern Syria in the Late 16th Century. Erlanger Geographische Arbeiten, Sonderband 5. Erlangen, Germany: Vorstand der Fränkischen Geographischen Gesellschaft. ISBN 3-920405-41-2.
- Karmon, Y. (1960). "An Analysis of Jacotin's Map of Palestine" (PDF). Israel Exploration Journal. 10 (3, 4): 155–173, 244–253. Archived from the original (PDF) on 2019-12-22.
- Khamisy, Rabei G. (2014). "The Treaty of 1283 between Sultan Qalāwūn and the Frankish Authorities of Acre: A New Topographical Discussion". Israel Exploration Journal. 64, 1: 72–102.
- Mills, E., ed. (1932). Census of Palestine 1931. Population of Villages, Towns and Administrative Areas. Jerusalem: Government of Palestine.
- Morris, B. (2004). The Birth of the Palestinian Refugee Problem Revisited. Cambridge University Press. ISBN 978-0-521-00967-6.
- Palmer, E.H. (1881). The Survey of Western Palestine: Arabic and English Name Lists Collected During the Survey by Lieutenants Conder and Kitchener, R. E. Transliterated and Explained by E.H. Palmer. Committee of the Palestine Exploration Fund.
- Petersen, Andrew (2001). A Gazetteer of Buildings in Muslim Palestine (British Academy Monographs in Archaeology). Vol. I. Oxford University Press. ISBN 978-0-19-727011-0. Archived from the original on 2021-05-28.
- Pringle, D. (1997). Secular buildings in the Crusader Kingdom of Jerusalem: an archaeological Gazetter. Cambridge University Press. ISBN 0521-46010-7.
- Pringle, D. (1998). The Churches of the Crusader Kingdom of Jerusalem: L-Z (excluding Tyre). Vol. II. Cambridge University Press. ISBN 0-521-39037-0.
- Pringle, D. (2009). The Churches of the Crusader Kingdom of Jerusalem: The cities of Acre and Tyre with Addenda and Corrigenda to Volumes I-III. Vol. IV. Cambridge University Press. ISBN 978-0-521-85148-0.
- Röhricht, R. (1893). (RRH) Regesta regni Hierosolymitani (MXCVII-MCCXCI) (in Latin). Berlin: Libraria Academica Wageriana.
- Schumacher, G. (1888). "Population list of the Liwa of Akka". Quarterly Statement - Palestine Exploration Fund. 20: 169–191.
