= Bustan HaGalil =

Moshav in northern Israel

Bustan HaGalil: בֻּסְתַּן הַגָּלִיל (Hebrew)
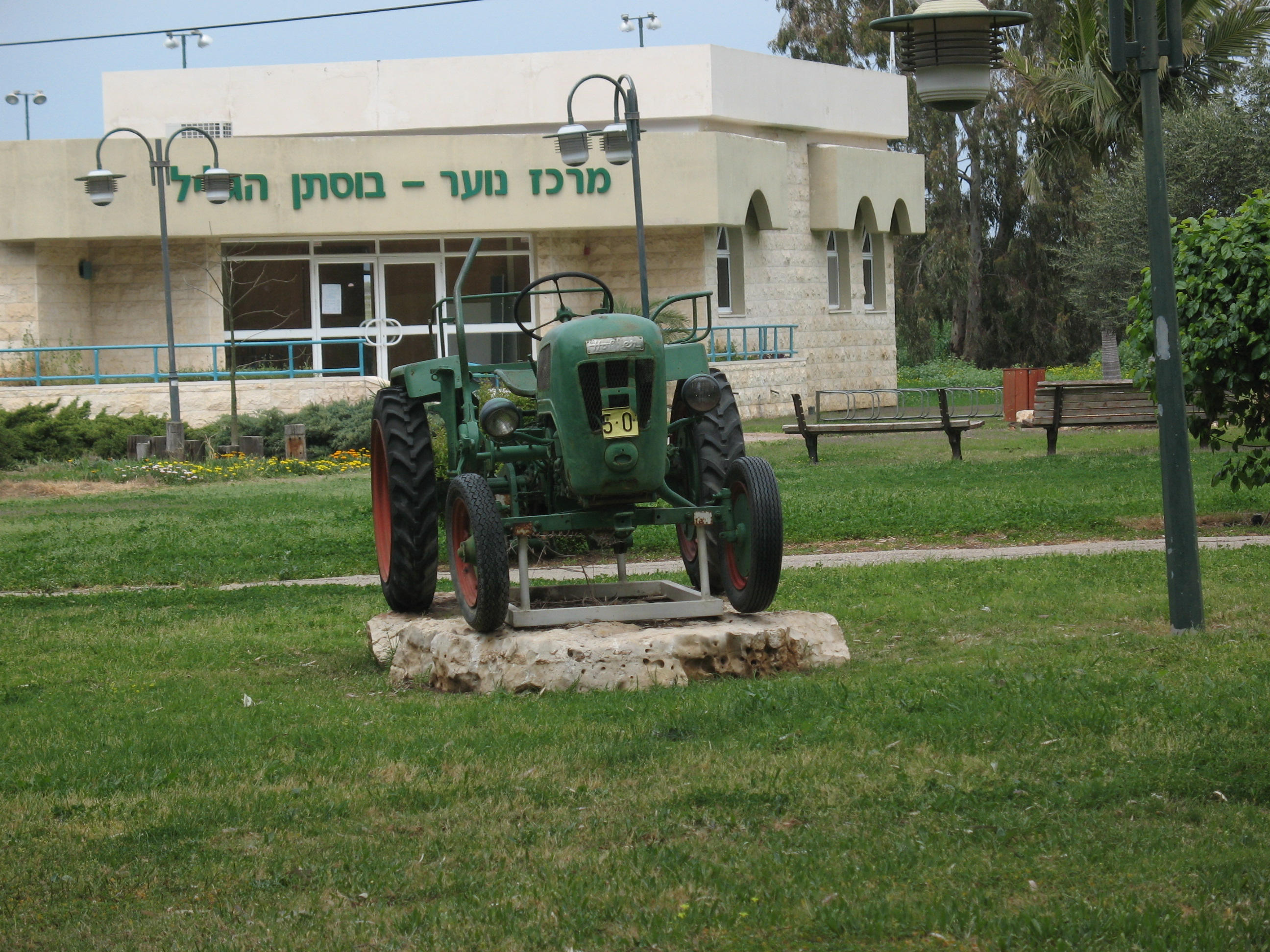
- Etymology: Orchard of the Galilee
- Location within Northwest Israel Location within Israel
- Coordinates: 32°57′4″N 35°4′58″E
- Country: Israel
- District: Northern
- Subdistrict: Acre
- Council: Mateh Asher
- Region: Western Galilee
- Affiliation: Agricultural Union
- Founded: 1948
- Founder: Romanian Holocaust survivors
- Population (2024): 1,085

Bustan HaGalil (Hebrew: בֻּסְתַּן הַגָּלִיל or בוסתן הגליל lit. Orchard of the Galilee) is a moshav in the Western Galilee in northern Israel. Located near Acre, it falls under the jurisdiction of Mateh Asher Regional Council. As of 2024 its population was 1,085.

== History ==
It was founded in 1948 by Holocaust survivors from Romania and was not far from the location of the deserted Arab village of Al-Manshiyya, north of the village site. The first arrivals used the buildings of the Sydney Smith Barracks, where the Armistice of Saint Jean d'Acre, which ended the Syria-Lebanon campaign of World War II in 1941, was signed. The name is symbolic, taken after the orchards in the area.

After the 1948 Arab–Israeli War, residents of the moshav of Beit Yosef joined them.
