= Yehi'am Natural Region =

Coordinates: 33°01′0″N 35°16′15″E

- Natural Region
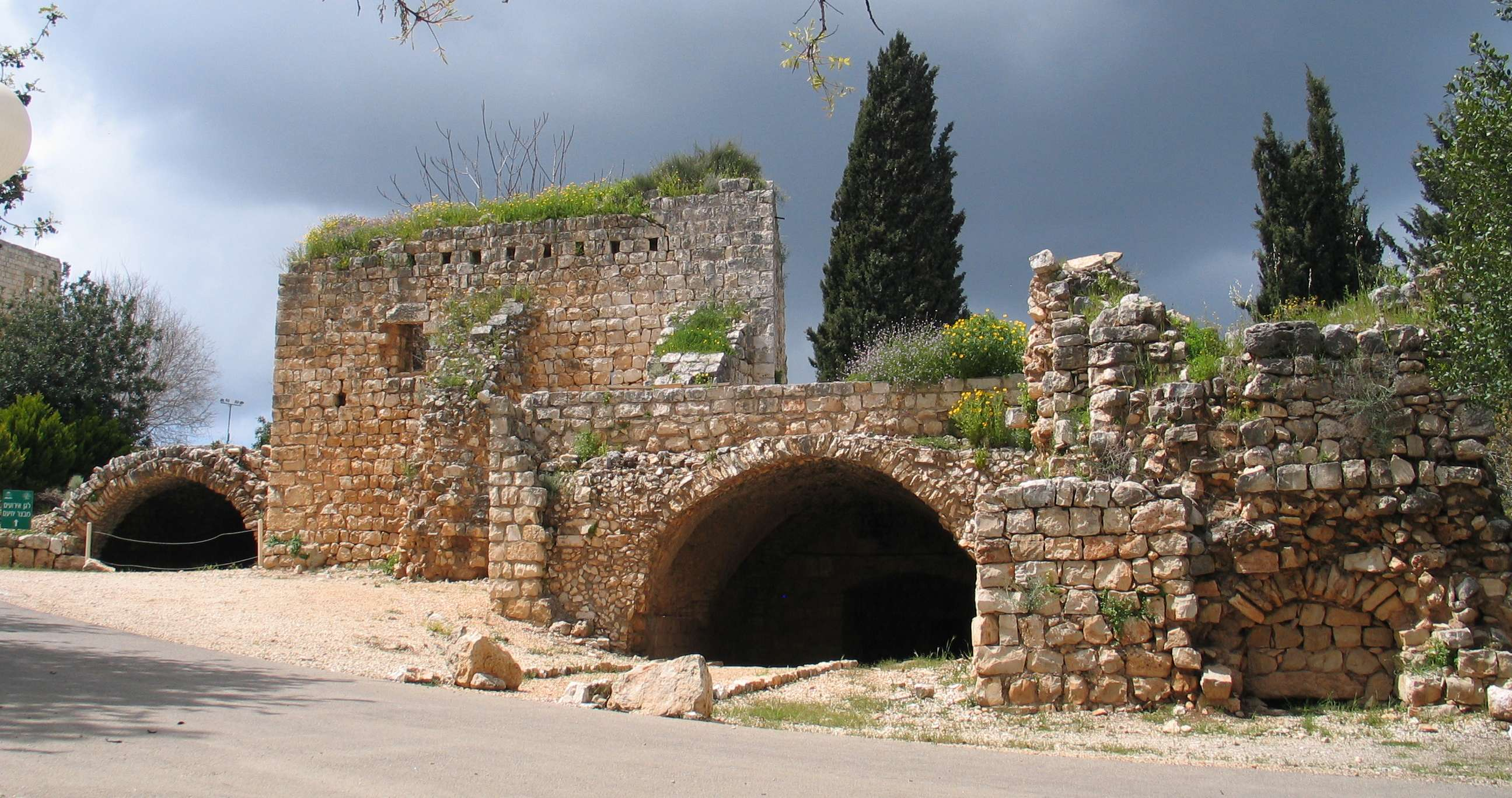
- The Jiddin fortress or Yehi'am Fortress
- Interactive map of Yehi'am Natural Region
- Country: Israel
- District: Northern
- Subdistrict: Acre
- Largest City: Ma'alot-Tarshiha

Area
  - Total: 237 km^{2} (92 sq mi)

Population (2024)
  - Total: 107,395

Ethnicity
  - Jews and others: 33.6%
  - Arabs: 65.8%

The Yehi'am Natural Region is a natural region in the Acre Subdistrict, in the Northern District of Israel. Ma'alot-Tarshiha is the largest city in the natural region.

== Geography ==
Districts, Subdistricts and Natural Regions of the State of Israel, 2018

The natural region consists of a mountainous area in the Upper Galilee, north of Karmiel and south of Israel's border with Lebanon. It has an area of 237 km^{2}. The population is highly decentralized - Ma'alot-Tarshiha is the largest town, but contains less than 25 percent of the natural region's population. Other large towns in the natural region are Yarka, Bayt Jann, Kisra-Sumei, Kfar Vradim, and Mi'ilya. Its namesake, the small kibbutz of Yehi'am, has fewer than 1,000 inhabitants. It contains portions of the Ma'ale Yosef, Mateh Asher, and Misgav regional councils.

== Demographics ==
Yehi'am is one of only three natural regions in Israel where the majority of inhabitants are Druze, and the only one outside the Golan Heights. Several large Druze towns are located here, such as Yarka, Bayt Jann, and Kisra-Sumei. Mi'ilya is a Christian town, while Sheikh Danun is a Muslim town. Ma'alot-Tarshiha is a mixed city of both Jews and Arabs, while its neighbor Kfar Vradim is Jewish.

Historical population
Year	Pop.	±%
1972	21,300	—
1983	32,000	+50.2%
1995	61,500	+92.2%
2008	88,100	+43.3%
2022	104,073	+18.1%
2024	107,395	+3.2%

== Administrative local authorities ==
Cities	Local Councils	Villages
Ma'alot-Tarshiha	Beit Jann; Julis; Kfar Vradim; Kisra-Sumei; Mi'ilya; Peki'in; Yanuh-Jat; Yarka	Ma'ale Yosef: Ein Ya'akov; Gita; Hosen; Lapidot; Manot; Me'ona; Mitzpe Hila; Neve Ziv; Peki'in HaHadasha; Tzuriel; Matte Asher: Ga'aton; Klil; Sheikh Dannun; Yehi'am; Misgav: Har Halutz; Harashim; Kishorit; Lavon; Pelekh; Tal El; Tuval

== Voting Patterns ==
In the 2022 election, 57 percent voted for the parties of the center-left coalition led by Yair Lapid, while 27 percent voted for the parties of the right-wing coalition led by Benjamin Netanyahu and 16 percent of voters in the natural region voted for the Arab parties.

In the 2026 election, 53 percent of voters in the natural region voted for the parties of the center-left coalition led by Gadi Eisenkot, while 28 percent voted for the parties of the right-wing coalition led by Benjamin Netanyahu and 15 percent voted for the Arab parties. An additional 1.8 percent voted for the Reservists, and 0.9 percent voted for Amcha Yisrael. Voter turnout increased 28 percent from the 2022 election.
