= Elon Natural Region =

Coordinates: 33°01′04″N 35°20′46″E

- Natural Region
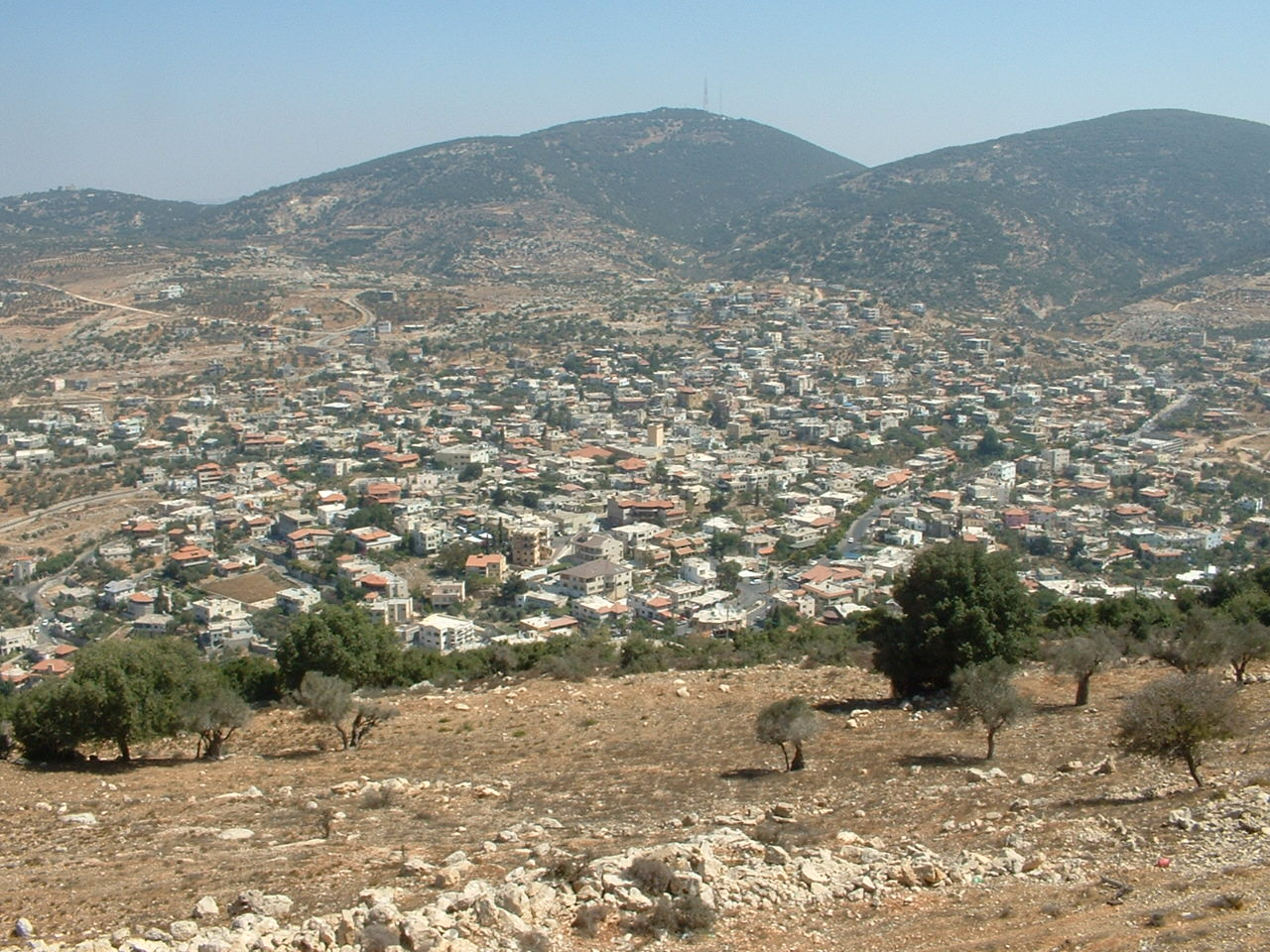
- View of Hurfeish
- Interactive map of Elon Natural Region
- Country: Israel
- District: Northern
- Subdistrict: Acre
- Largest City: Hurfeish

Area
  - Total: 134 km^{2} (52 sq mi)

Population (2024)
  - Total: 23,282

Ethnicity
  - Jews and others: 45.4%
  - Arabs: 52.5%

The Elon Natural Region is a natural region in the Acre Subdistrict, in the Northern District of Israel. Hurfeish is the largest city in the natural region.

== Geography ==
Districts, Subdistricts and Natural Regions of the State of Israel, 2018

The natural region contains a diverse swath of small towns close to Israel's border with Lebanon, north of Ma'alot-Tarshiha and Bayt Jann. It has an area of 134 km^{2}. It is the least populous natural region in the Acre subdistrict. Hurfeish is the largest town, but contains less than a third of the natural region's population. Other towns in the natural region are Fassuta, Aramsha, and its namesake kibbutz, Eilon. It contains portions of the Ma'ale Yosef, Mateh Asher, Merom HaGalil, and Upper Galilee regional councils.

== Demographics ==
The natural region has a slight majority of Arabs, while 45 percent of its population is Jewish. Hurfeish is a Druze town, while Fassuta is a Christian town and Aramsha is a Bedouin town. The roughly twenty small kibbutzim in the natural region are populated by Jews.

Historical population
Year	Pop.	±%
1972	6,800	—
1983	9,500	+39.7%
1995	12,400	+30.5%
2008	17,100	+37.9%
2022	22,361	+30.8%
2024	23,282	+4.1%

== Administrative local authorities ==
Cities	Local Councils	Villages
[None]	Fassuta; Hurfeish	Ma'ale Yosef: Abirim; Avdon; Elkosh; Even Menachem; Goren; Gornot HaGalil; Mattat; Netu'a; Shtula; Shomera; Ya'ara; Zar'it; Matte Asher: Adamit; Arab al-Aramshe; Eilon; Hanita; Matzuva; Merom HaGalil: Dovev; Upper Galilee: Bar'am; Sasa; Tziv'on; Yir'on

== Voting Patterns ==
In the 2022 election, 58 percent of voters in the natural region voted for the parties of the center-left coalition led by Yair Lapid, while 28 percent voted for the parties of the right-wing coalition led by Benjamin Netanyahu and 14 percent voted for the Arab parties.

In the 2026 election, 53 percent of voters in the natural region voted for the parties of the center-left coalition led by Gadi Eisenkot, while 24 percent voted for the parties of the right-wing coalition led by Benjamin Netanyahu and 17 percent voted for the Arab parties. An additional 2.5 percent voted for the Reservists, and 2.7 percent voted for Amcha Yisrael. Voter turnout increased 25 percent from the 2022 election.
