= Nahal Kziv =

Coordinates: 33°2′29.84″N 35°14′52.66″E

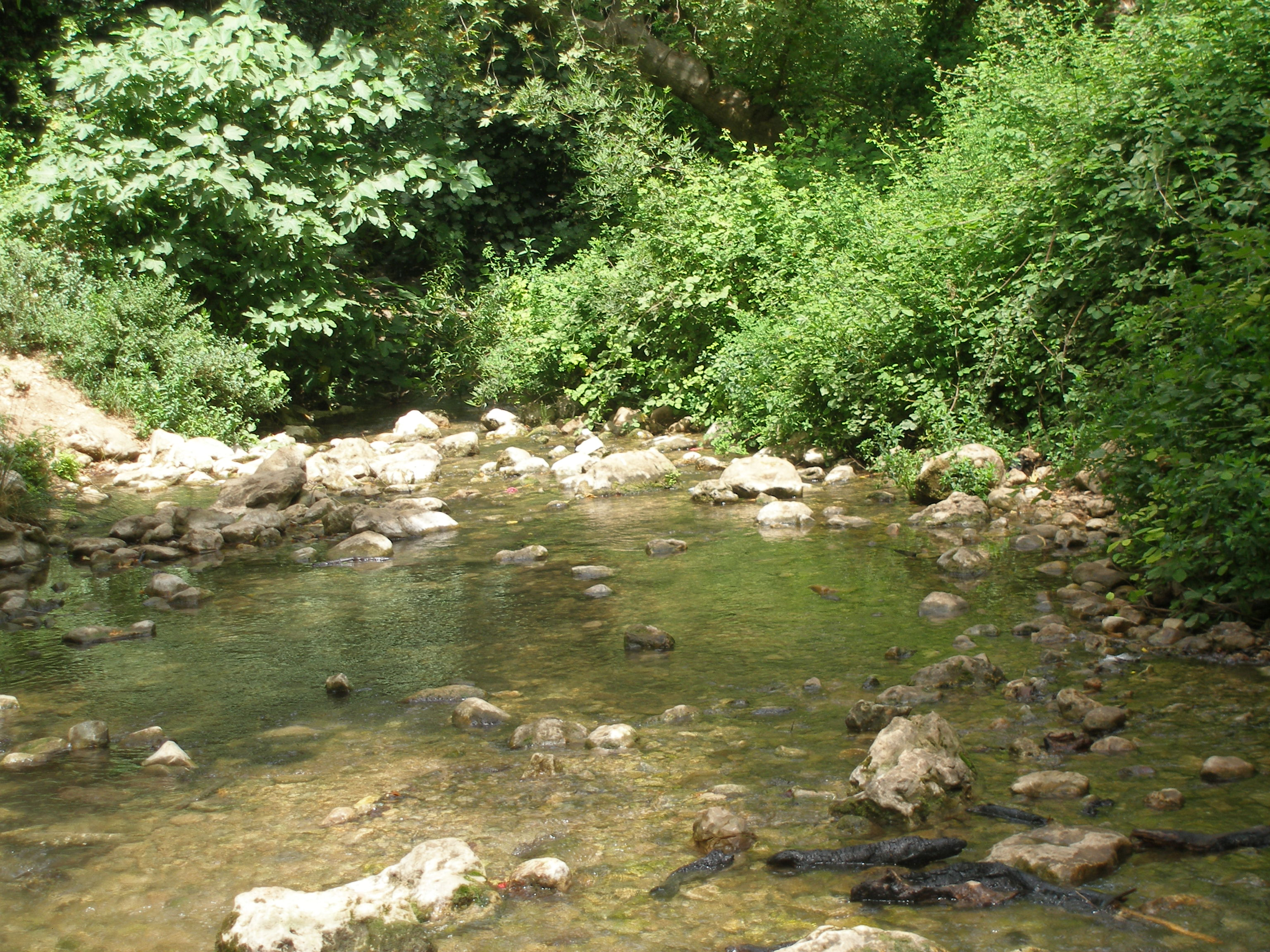

Location
- State: Israel

Basin features
- Tributaries
  - left: Nahal Shfanim
  - right: Nahal Moran

Nahal Kziv (Hebrew: נחל כזיב) (lit. "Kziv stream") or the Horn Valley (Arabic: وادي القرن, romanized: Wadi al Qarn) is a 39-kilometer long perennial stream in the Upper Galilee, Israel. During the winter, rainfall fills the channel, and springs along the riverbed add to the flow. Currently, Mekorot (the Israeli national water company) pumps the water of the river's principal spring, Ein Ziv, and supplies it to the residents of the Western Galilee, making the channel between Ein Ziv and Ein Tamir an intermittent stream. On the southern ridge overlooking the valley sits a 12th-century Crusader castle, Montfort, the old headquarters of the Teutonic Order in the Holy Land.

== Geography ==
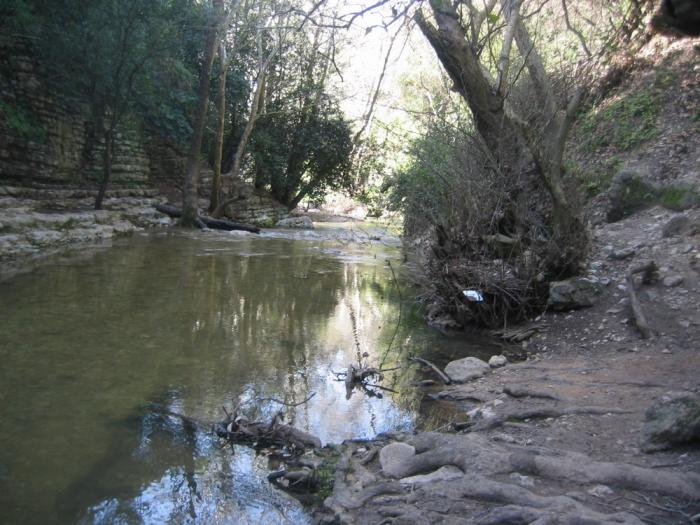
Nahal Kziv

The Horn Valley flows from the western side of Mount Meron near Beit Jann, westward to its estuary, north of and Achziv. It is the longest stream in the Galilee, with the widest drainage basin. The channel passes nearby Hurfeish, Abirim, Mi'ilya, Mitzpe Hila, Neve Ziv, Goren, Manot, and Ma'alot-Tarshiha. Springs along the channel include:

- Ein Ziv
- Ein Tamir (after which the stream becomes perennial).
- Ein Hardalit
- Ein Yakim

== Nature reserve ==
Most of the stream is part of a nature reserve that bears its name, and includes the Montfort Castle and other Crusader-period ruins. A stone carving of a man, 1.78 m high can be found near where the Abirim stream empties into the Horn Valley. The carving is thought to date from the Hellenistic period.

Flora in the area includes Lilium candidum, Rubus sanguineus, Nerium oleander, Platanus orientalis, Artemisia arborescens, and Ferns. Persian fallow deer were brought to the area in 1996, as part of an effort to prevent extinction of the species. Other wildlife belonging to the nature reserve include golden jackals, wolves, wild boar, and the rare striped hyena.

== See also ==
- List of rivers of Israel
