= Yitzhak Vaknin =

Israeli politician (born 1958)

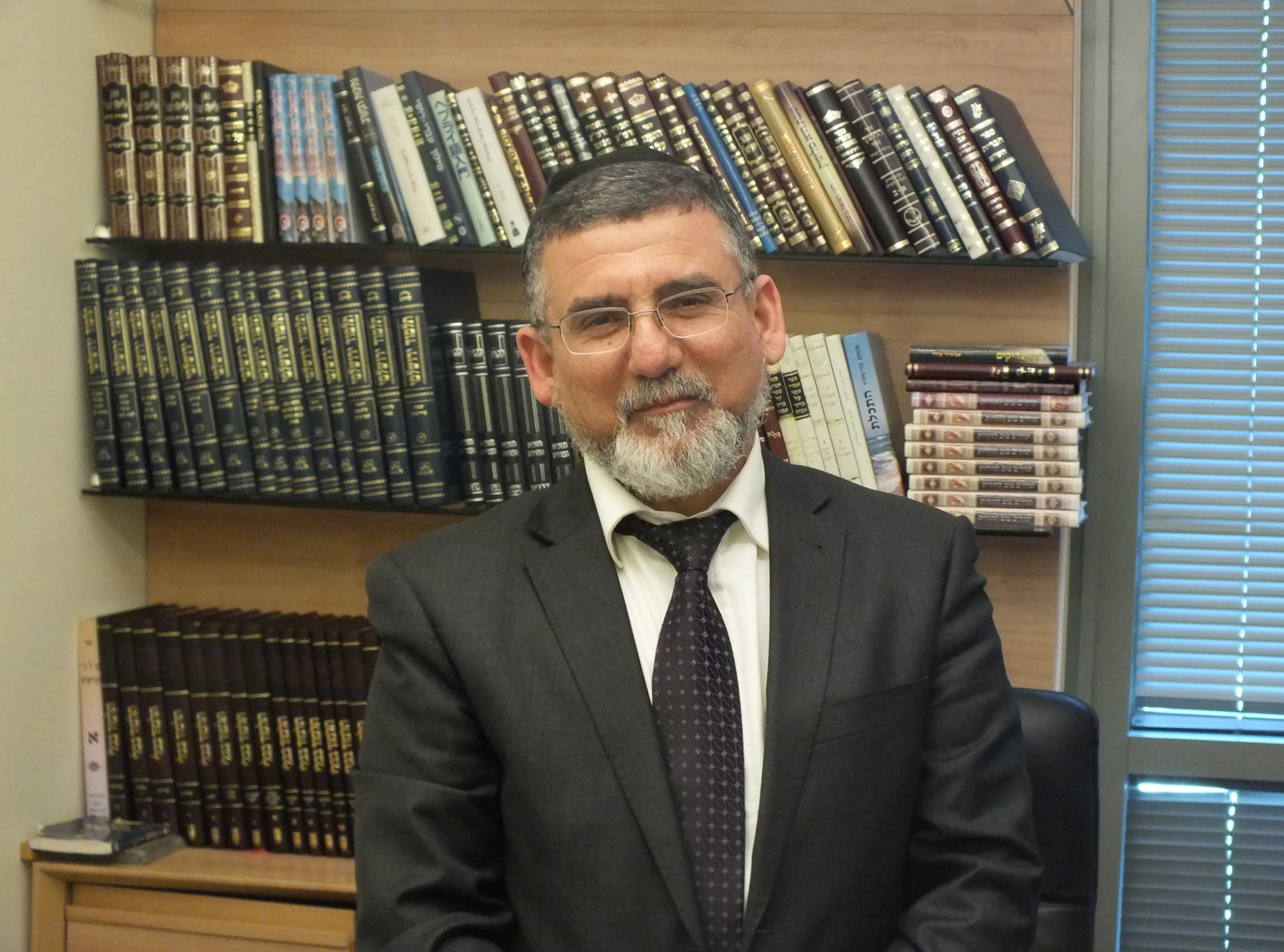

Ministerial roles
- 2019–2020: Minister of Religious Services

Faction represented in the Knesset
- 1996–2019: Shas

Personal details
- Born: 12 May 1958 (age 68) Israel

Yitzhak Vaknin (Hebrew: יצחק וקנין; born 12 May 1958) is an Israeli politician. He served as a member of the Knesset for Shas between 1996 and 2019, and as Minister of Religious Services in 2019 and 2020.

== Biography ==
Vaknin was born into a family that had immigrated from Morocco in 1954. Between 1982 and 1987 he served as secretary of the Gornot HaGalil communal settlement. In 1988 he became chairman of the committee of Ya'ara, a position he held until 1996. Between 1988 and 1993 he also served as secretary of Ma'ale Yosef Regional Council, and from 1993 until 1996 as the head of its religious council.

He was first elected to the Knesset in 1996. He retained his seat in the 1999 elections, and was appointed Deputy Minister of Communications on 5 August 1999, a role he held until 11 July 2000, when Shas resigned from the government. After Ariel Sharon formed a new government, Vaknin was appointed Deputy Minister of Labor and Social Welfare on 2 May 2001. He left the position on 20 May 2002, but returned to it on 3 June.

He retained his seat again in the 2003, 2006, 2009, 2013 and 2015 elections. He was appointed Minister of Religious Services in January 2019, but did not run in the April 2019 elections.

He is married with five children and lives in Ya'ara.
