= Migdal Tefen =

Industrial council in Israel

Coordinates: 32.9765°N 35.2745°E

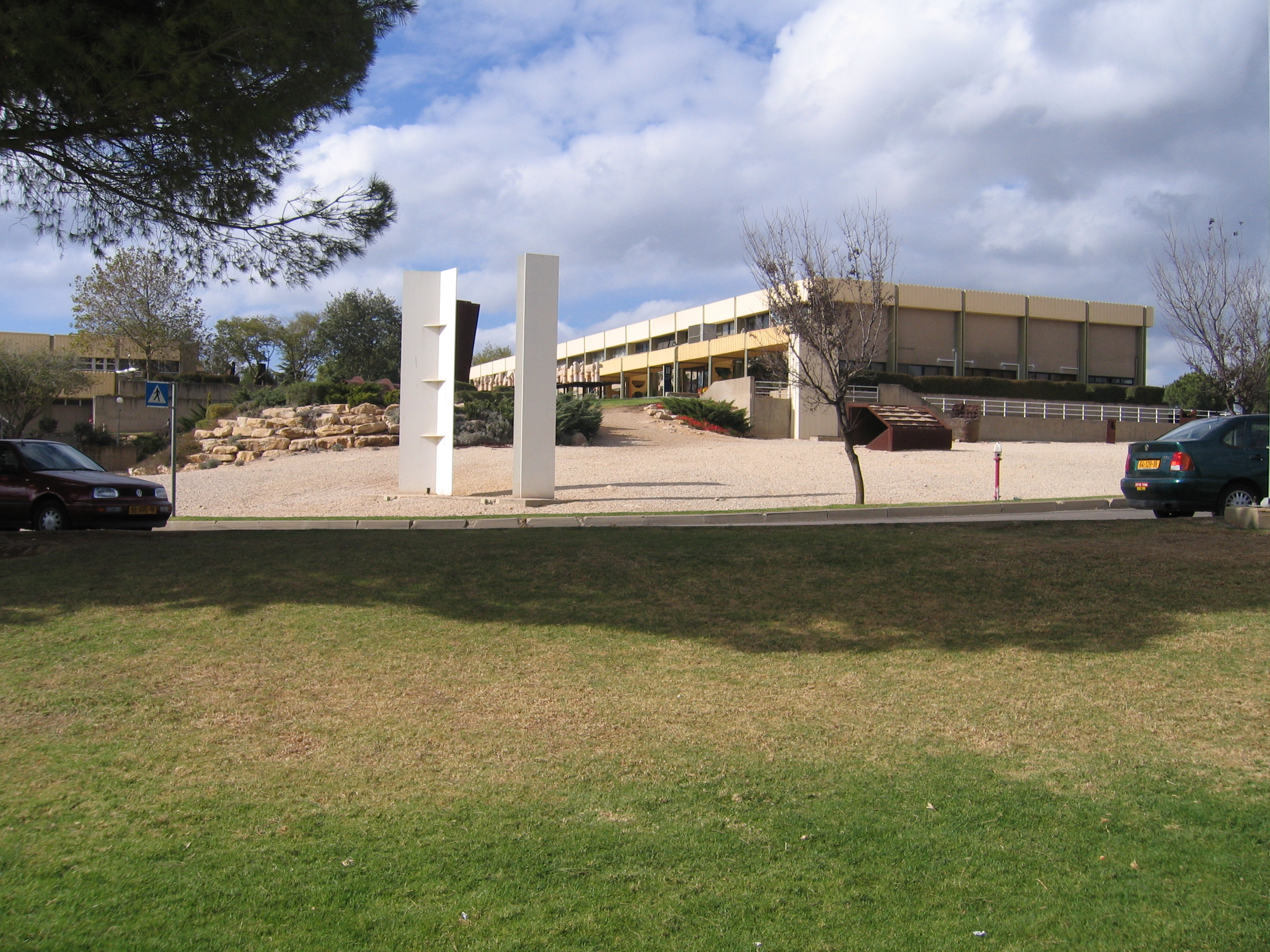
Tefen0049

Migdal Tefen is an industrial council in the Upper Galilee, which contains only industrial plants. Within the council's area, there is a light industry and high-tech industry zone, an industrial park, the Tefen Open Museum, a rehabilitation center called Gesher, and also several restaurants. The jurisdiction area of the council extends over 2,700 dunams. It is located about 6 kilometers from Ma'alot-Tarshiha and about 17 kilometers from Karmiel, between the moshav Lapidot to the south and the community settlement Kfar Vradim to the north, and Druze villages that are located to its west and east. The head of the council, as of July 2023, is Faiz Hana.

== Geography ==
Migdal Tefen borders three councils, to the south Ma'ale Yosef Regional Council, to the west and north Yanuh-Jat Council, and to the east from north and south Kisra-Sumei Council. The council is located south of the city of Ma'alot-Tarshiha and north of the city of Karmiel in the Tefen region, in a mountainous area with many rocks and streams.

== History ==
Construction work began in the council area in 1966 by the Jewish National Fund. Subsequently, an asphalt road was paved and surrounding it, settlements and observation points were established. In 1981, the industrialist Stef Wertheimer resigned from the Knesset and began to work on the construction of the industrial area. That same year, he participated in the planning of Kfar Vradim, which was established in 1984.

In 1982, the "Iskar" factories were moved from Nahariya to Tefen and constituted the beginning of the industrial area. A year later, the industrial park was established in the place and provided a solution for small factories in their early years. Over the years, many more factories were added to the place, including the "Vulkan" battery factory and the "Tofinei Saar" chocolate factory.

The industrial area, which was initially connected only to Highway 89, Nahariya–Safed, was also connected to the city of Karmiel, and to Highway 85, Acre–Safed. In 1991, after the dissolution of the Central Galilee Regional Council, within whose jurisdiction the Tefen Industrial Area was located, the Tefen Industrial Council was established, the first of its kind in the Galilee and the second in the country after Ramat Hovav. The local council encompasses 62 factories, employing residents from all the surrounding settlements – Druze, Christians, Muslims, and Jews.

== Industrial park ==
In the industrial area there is an industrial park, an incubator for industrialists and entrepreneurs at the beginning of their journey. The industrial park brings together small industrial enterprises in its territory, which are in the stages of construction and allows them to save expenses by joint renting of services. Dozens of companies and factories are located in Tifen Industrial Park. The park includes 25,000 square meters of industrial buildings spread over an area of 120 dunams. About 30 companies that started in the industrial park have expanded and moved to the adjacent industrial area. Factories located in the Industrial Park area are Western Digital (formerly SanDisk Israel) and Grandma Jamila's soap factory. The industrial park in Tefen was the first industrial park built by Steph Wertheimer; after which other industrial parks were built in Tel Hai, Omer, Balbon and Nazareth.

=== Heads of the Council ===
- Ronen Plot – end of the nineties until July 10, 2001. Later became the mayor of Nof HaGalil (formerly Upper Nazareth)
- Eli Aflalo – July 10, 2001 – 2003. Previously served as a member of the Afula City Council and later was a Knesset member on behalf of Likud.
- Hanan Asulin – 2003 – July 2, 2005
- Yaron Kamhi – July 2, 2005 – 2011
- Tzvika Cohen – September 4, 2011 – 2013. A member of the Shas party, also served as the mayor of Elad and head of the Neot Hovav Industrial Council
- Yigal Tzarfati – December 2013 – February 2016
- Sigal Shaaltiel-Halevi – February 2016 – 2023
- Faiz Hanna – starting from July 2023
