= Montfort Castle =

Crusader castle in Israel

- מבצר מונפור
- Part of Nahal Kziv Nature Reserve
- Israel
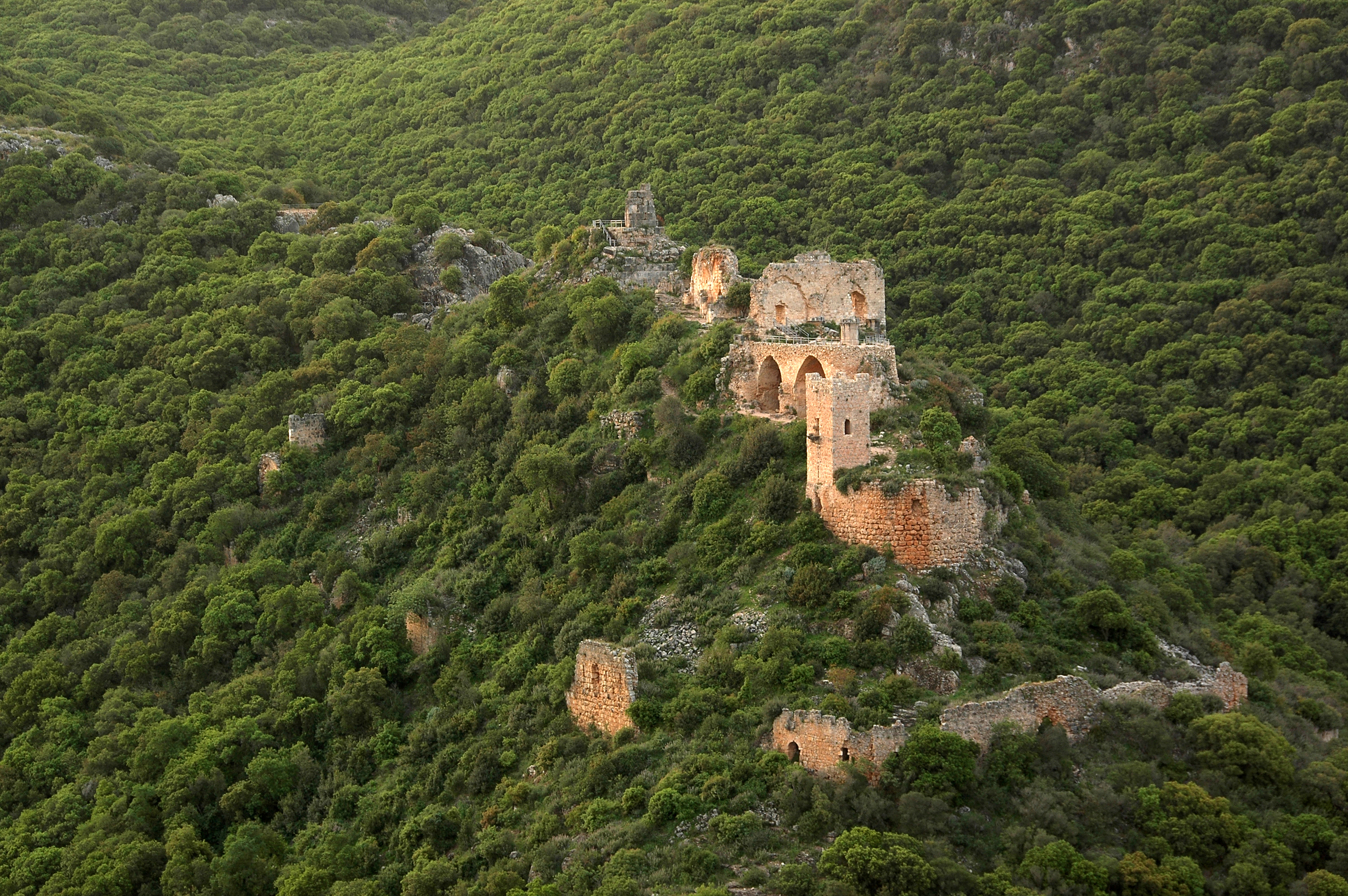

Site information
- Type: Spur castle
- Open to the public: Yes
- Condition: Ruins

Location
- Location within Israel
- Coordinates: 33°02′41″N 35°13′34″E

Site history
- Built: 1228–1240, 1260s
- Built by: Teutonic Order
- In use: 1230 – 1271
- Materials: limestone
- Battles/wars: sieges 1266, 1271

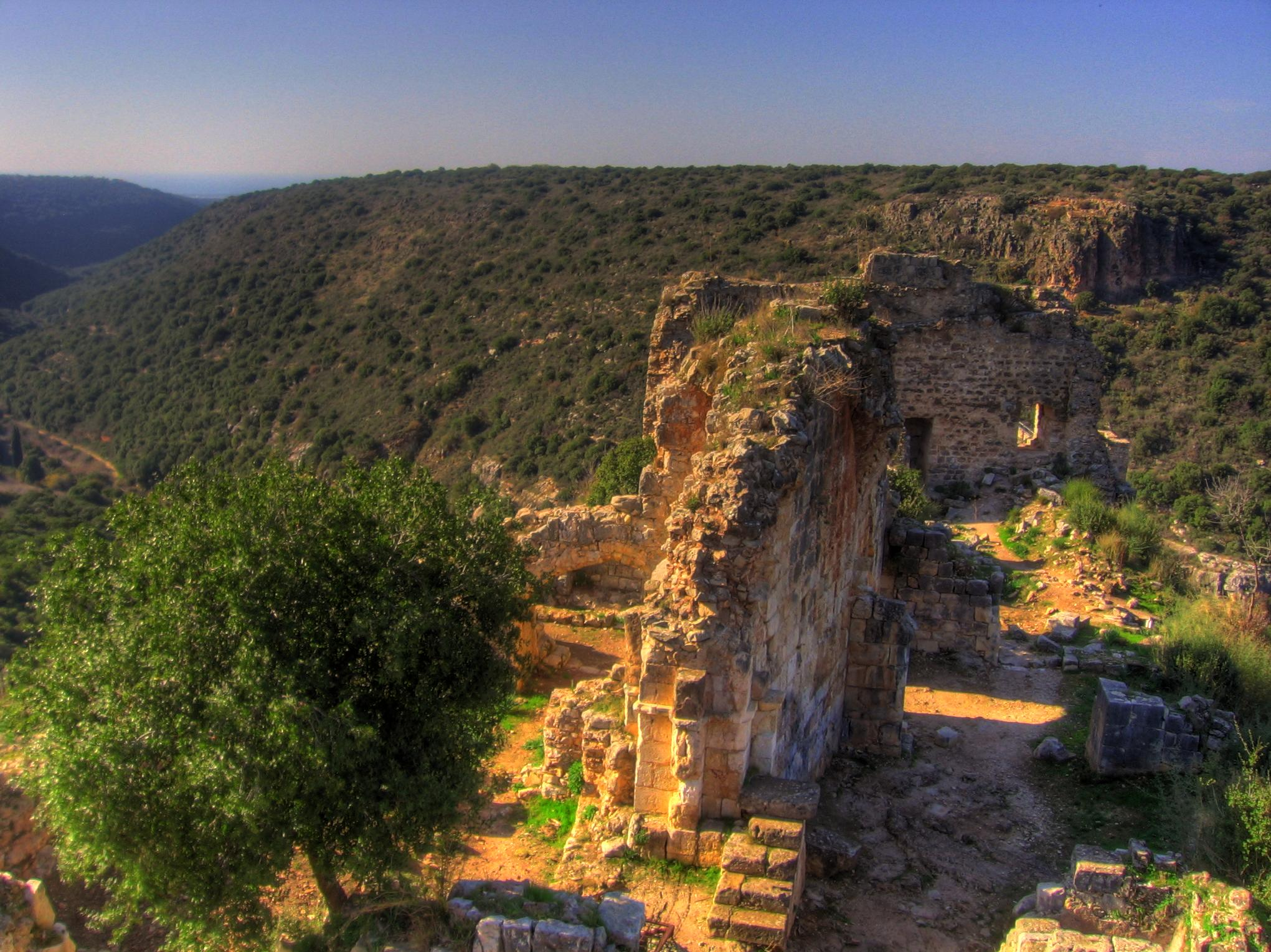
The elongated central domestic wing

Montfort (Hebrew: מבצר מונפור, Mivtzar Monfor; Arabic: قلعة القرين, Qal'at al-Qurain or Qal'at al-Qarn - "Castle of the Little Horn" or "Castle of the Horn"; German: Burg Starkenberg) is a ruined 13th-century Crusader castle in the Upper Galilee region in northern Israel, about 22 miles (35 km) northeast of the city of Haifa and 10 miles (16 km) south of the border with Lebanon. It served as the seat of the Grand Master of the Teutonic Order and the order's own realm within the Kingdom of Jerusalem during its last decades of existence.

The site is now a national park inside the Nahal Kziv nature reserve, and is an important tourist destination attracting many visitors from inside and outside Israel.

== Etymology ==
The name of the castle derives from the two French words mont, mountain, and fort, strong, meaning "strong mountain". In German, the castle was accordingly called Starkenberg, meaning the same phrase (stark meaning strong and Berg meaning mountain). It was built on land that the Teutonic Order purchased from the French de Milly family in 1220 and is one of the finest examples of fortified building architecture in the kingdom of Jerusalem.

== History ==
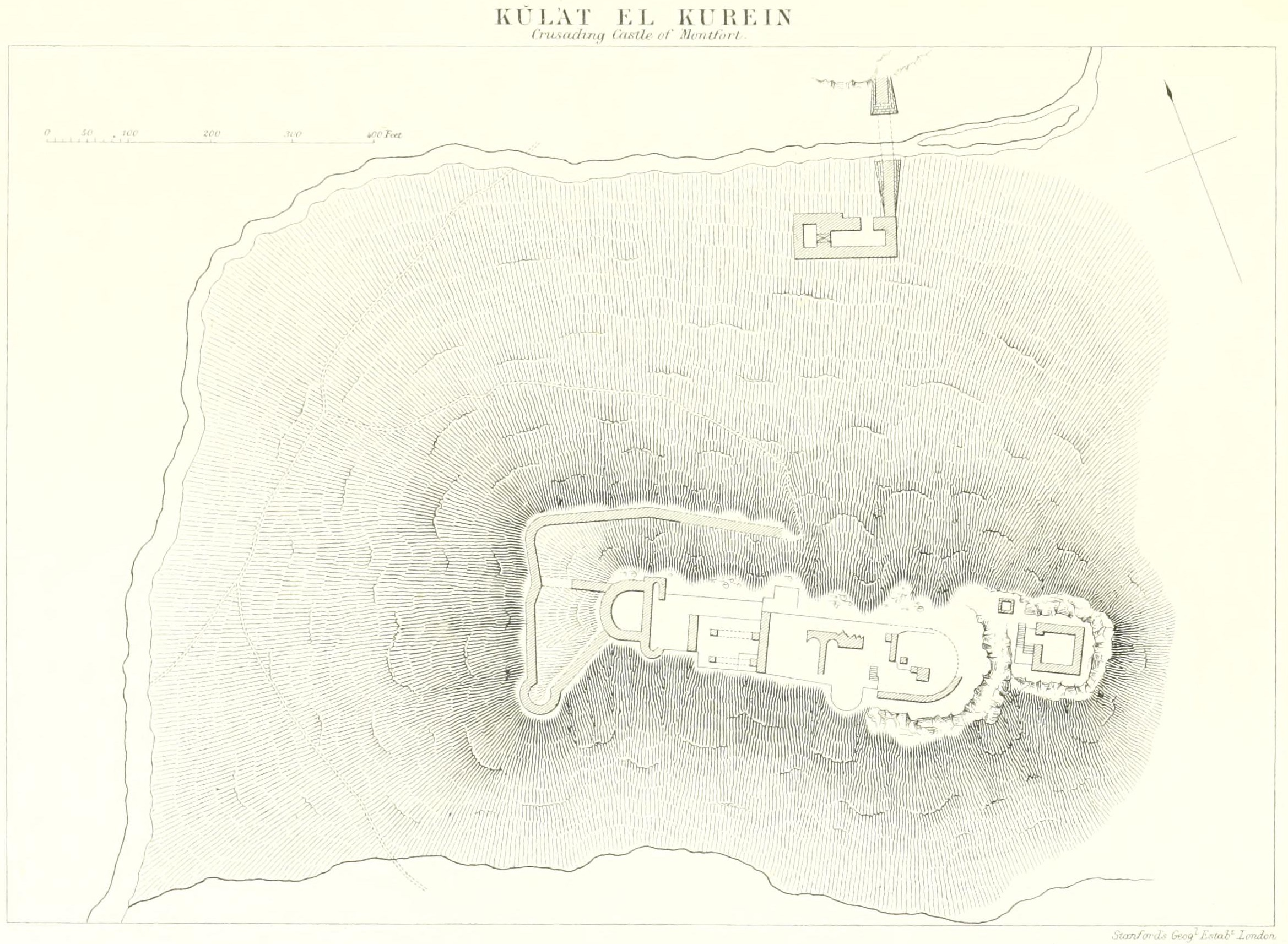
The castle shown in the 1871-77 PEF Survey of Palestine

Montfort was the principal castle in the Holy Land of the monastic military Teutonic Order, which was founded in the late 12th century in the port city of Acre. The castle is built on a narrow and steep cliff above the southern bank of Nahal Kziv in the Upper Galilee region, about 8 mi (13 km) northeast of the city of Nahariya. Unlike many other Crusader castles in the Holy Land, this castle was not originally built for military purposes, but was built to move some of the order's administration, such as the archives and treasury, from Acre to a more isolated location. The Teutonic Order had at the time come under pressure from the Templars and the Hospitallers in Acre, who had designs of taking it over.

Soon after the Crusaders reconquered the Holy Land from the Muslims in 1099 during the First Crusade, European settlers began to populate the land. The noble French de Milly family received the estate and began to cultivate the land, turning it into a farming estate. In 1187 Muslims under the leadership of Saladin managed to defeat the Crusaders and take over Jerusalem following the Battle of Hattin. Along with Jerusalem, the property which was to be the Montfort castle became a Muslim possession as well. The Muslims, just like their Crusader predecessors, did not find the property particularly significant. The farmland lacked strategic importance because it was situated inland, above a stream, far away from any border or main road.

Saladin's victory triggered the Third Crusade (1189–1192). Led by King Richard I of England, the Third Crusade ended with a substantial Crusader victory. Nonetheless, the territories of the Kingdom of Jerusalem were much smaller in size than those from before Saladin's reconquests. Jerusalem and most of the central Judea and Samaria mountains remained under Muslim control, and the Crusaders ruled mainly in the coastal plain and the Galilee. As the Crusaders set their new capital in Acre, the significance of the Montfort estate increased, due to the proximity of the property to the new capital (8 mi). Although the de Milly family received back the territory after its recapture during the Third Crusade, they sold it to the Teutonic Knights in 1220. The German knights began to renovate the buildings of the estate and, following internal conflicts between themselves and the Knights Templar and Knights Hospitaller, it was imperative for the Teutonic Knights to leave Acre for a separate headquarters, and the property (on which the Montfort was soon to be built) was a natural choice.

=== Building and use of the castle (1228–1271) ===
Following a formal request of assistance by Grand Master Hermann von Salza to Pope Gregory IX, the latter sent numerous fiscal contributions by many pilgrims and European citizens, to aid in the renovation of the new property. With the help of these contributions, the Teutonic Knights fortified the property and turned it into a magnificent castle. The knights set their headquarters, archive, and treasury at the new property in 1229. By that time the property ceased being simply a farming estate and was considered a castle with all its implications. The Teutonic Knights expanded the fortifications and built an elongated two-storey hall-type structure in the centre; this is now the main remnant of the ruined castle.

=== Siege of 1266 ===
An army led by two emirs of Mamluk sultan Baibars besieged the castle in 1266. However, the defenders resisted and eventually compelled the Mamluk army to leave.

=== Siege of 1271 and Mamluk conquest ===
In 1271, after most of the Crusader strongholds had fallen into Baibars' hands, the Mamluk leader himself besieged the castle using several military engineering battalions. After about three days of siege Baibars' troops took the rabad or faubourg, the next day the bashura or outer bailey fell, and on the fifteenth day the German defenders, which were still resisting in the keep, surrendered. Due to prior negotiations between Baibars and the Crusaders, the latter were allowed to leave the castle with all of their belongings and return to Acre. After the fall of that city in 1291, the Teutonic Knights made Venice their headquarters.

The Mamluks then thoroughly demolished (slighted) the castle over a period of twelve days.

Adrian Boas blames the rapid fall of the castle on its weak geographical location and the unfinished outer works, while Nicholas Morton of Nottingham Trent University includes as factors Baibars' pillage of the Teutonic Order's estate and the weakened morale of the defenders after the fall in 1271 of three more military order castles.

== Architecture ==
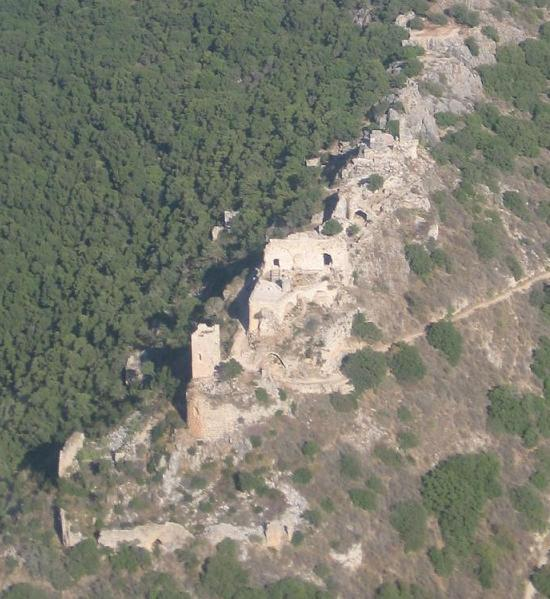
Montfort Castle from southwest, stretching down a spur

Topographically, a spur is a narrow ridge projecting from a larger hill. Built on this defensible feature, Montfort is a spur castle. The defences are concentrated at the most vulnerable eastern side where the spur joins the hip. On that sids face there are two ditches in front of a large D-shaped tower. The entrance to the castle is on the opposite side, with a smaller entrance tower guarding it. As the top of the spur is quite narrow, the main residential buildings are arranged in sequence between these two towers along the top of the ridge. Together with a western gate zwinger, these elements constitute the upper ward, or the castle proper. The outer ward, possibly unfinished by the time the castle fell in 1271, is delineated by the remnants of an outer defensive wall extending down the northern and western slopes.

East-to-west elements:

=== Dry moats ===
Two ditches cut through the spur to the east of the tower-keep.

=== Tower-keep ===
The D-shaped keep was the first part to be built. It protects the castle from the highest, and most exposed, eastern point.

=== Elongated two-storey building ===
West of the keep, an elongated two-storey building was added. This became the main domestic structure, stretching between the keep to the east and the three-storey administrative building to the west.

=== Three-storey administrative building ===
The three-storey administrative building to the lower, western end of the main castle contained what Adrian Boas interprets as the ceremonial hall (second storey), and the living quarters of the castellan (third storey). At ground level, two tall vaulted halls are still standing.

=== Westernmost building ===
A small vaulted structure was added to the west. It is now badly ruined.

=== Access system – gate tower and zwingers ===
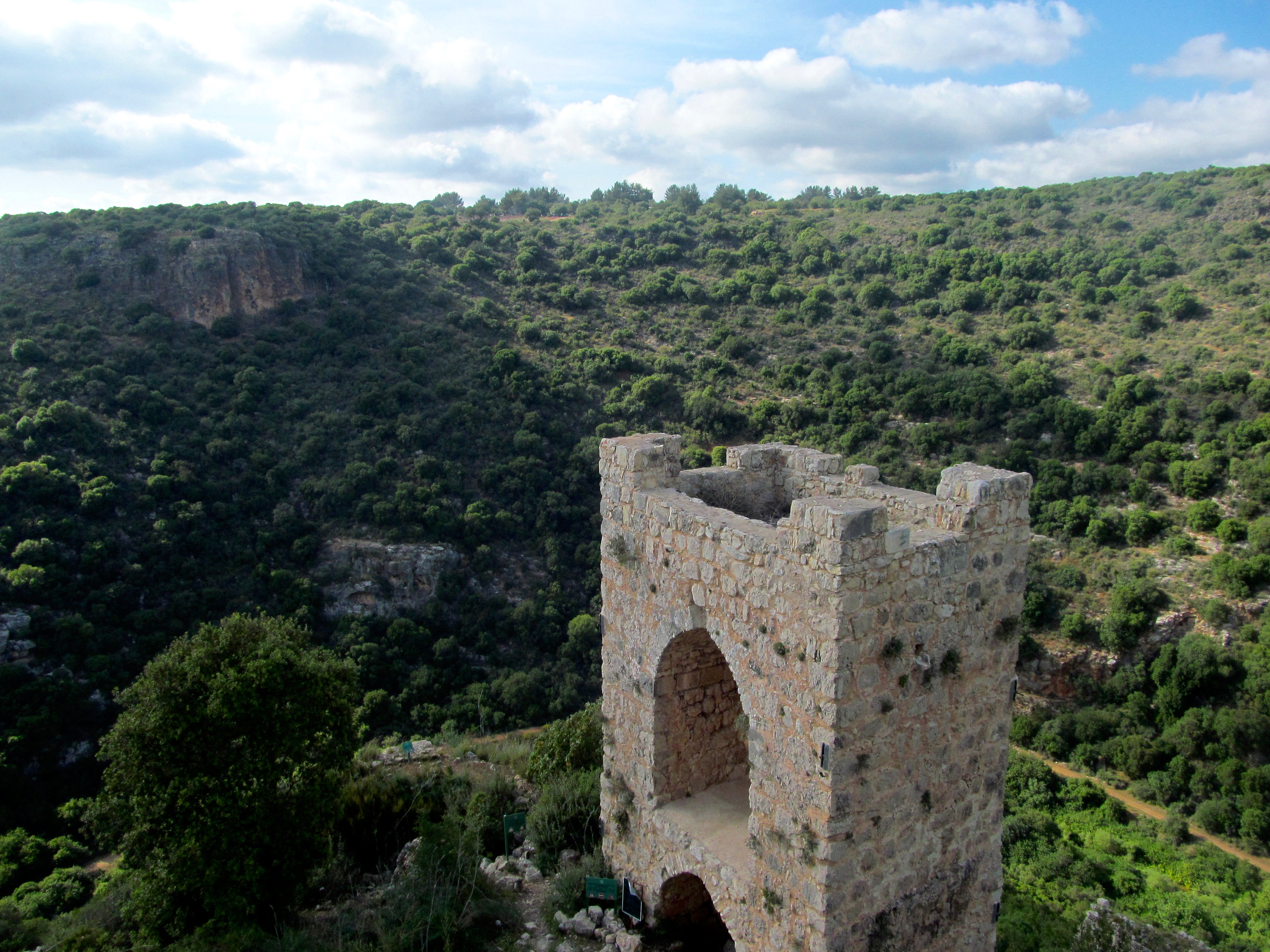
The inner gate tower

The main entrance to the castle was through a three-storey gate tower. This was built as a half tower and is well preserved. It gave access to a gate zwinger created by a wall which included the gate tower, stretched westwards, turned south following a semicircular plan, and connected to the castle at the westernmost vaulted building.

People entering this gate and its zwinger would have probably continued along the northern wall of the administrative and domestic buildings, apparently passing here through a second, elongated zwinger which was closed in on its northern side by a now badly ruined wall. One would have finally accessed the castle through a gate opening onto a vestibule situated at the eastern end of the domestic building, between this and the keep.

=== Outer ward ===
An external wall enclosed the outer ward, situated some 50 metres down the northern slope from the castle proper, curving up along the western slope and ending southwest of the castle. No trace of a continuation south of the castle has been discovered until the end of the 2016 excavation season; if anything, there might have been a connecting wall going up the slope to the westernmost part of the upper ward. In the outer ward several auxiliary structures were discovered, including the stables.

== Related structures ==
=== Mill and guest house below the castle ===
A building containing a water mill with its upper floor converted into a guest house during the 13th century is located in the Kziv River valley below the castle.

=== Tarphile ===
A fortified courtyard building with a tower at a stone quarry used for building Montfort Castle at less than 1 km of the castle towards Mi'ilya/Castellum Regis. This might be the rabad (faubourg) mentioned in Arab chronicles as being the first fortification taken by Baibars in 1271. It appears in Crusader sources as Tarphile, Trefile, or Tertille.

=== Castellum Regis ===
The former royal castle, later residence of the de Milly family before the purchase of their property by the Teutonic Order in 1220 and known from Crusader sources as Mhalia or Castellum Novum Regis. Its ruins are located today in the Christian Arab village of Mi'ilya, where modern houses have been built against some of its outer walls.

== Excavations ==
The castle was surveyed in 1877 by Horatio H. Kitchener for the British Survey of Western Palestine.

Archaeological excavations at Montfort occurred in 1926 in an expedition organised by Bashford Dean, curator of the Arms and Armour Department of the Metropolitan Museum of Art in New York. William L. Calver was chosen by Dean to head the excavation.

A four-week season of excavations was conducted in the summer of 2011, organised by Professor Adrian Boas from the University of Haifa and supported by the Society for the Study of the Crusades and the Latin East. Excavations have continued every summer since then. In August 2015 and 2016 the excavations were aided by students from Royal Holloway, University of London.

In 2017, board games and a luxury dining room were discovered at Montfort Castle. In 2018, a decorated Gothic hall was located under the castle. A year later, evidence of Mamluk destruction was found, dates back to the Baibars' campaign in 1266.
