= Gita, Israel =

Gita: גִּתָּה, גיתה (Hebrew)
- Location within Northwest Israel Location within Israel
- Coordinates: 32°58′0″N 35°14′21″E
- Country: Israel
- District: Northern
- Subdistrict: Acre
- Council: Ma'ale Yosef
- Affiliation: HaMerkaz HaHakla'i
- Founded: 1980
- Population (2024): 290

Gita (Hebrew: גִּתָּה) is a communal settlement in northern Israel. Located near Ma'alot-Tarshiha, Jat and Yirka, it falls under the jurisdiction of Ma'ale Yosef Regional Council. In 2024 it had a population of 290.

== History ==
The village was founded in 1980 as part of the "Lookouts in the Galilee" plan to establish Jewish settlements in the area, but was later abandoned. It was re-established in 1993 by immigrants from the former Soviet Union. It is named after a nearby stream.
