= Gornot HaGalil =

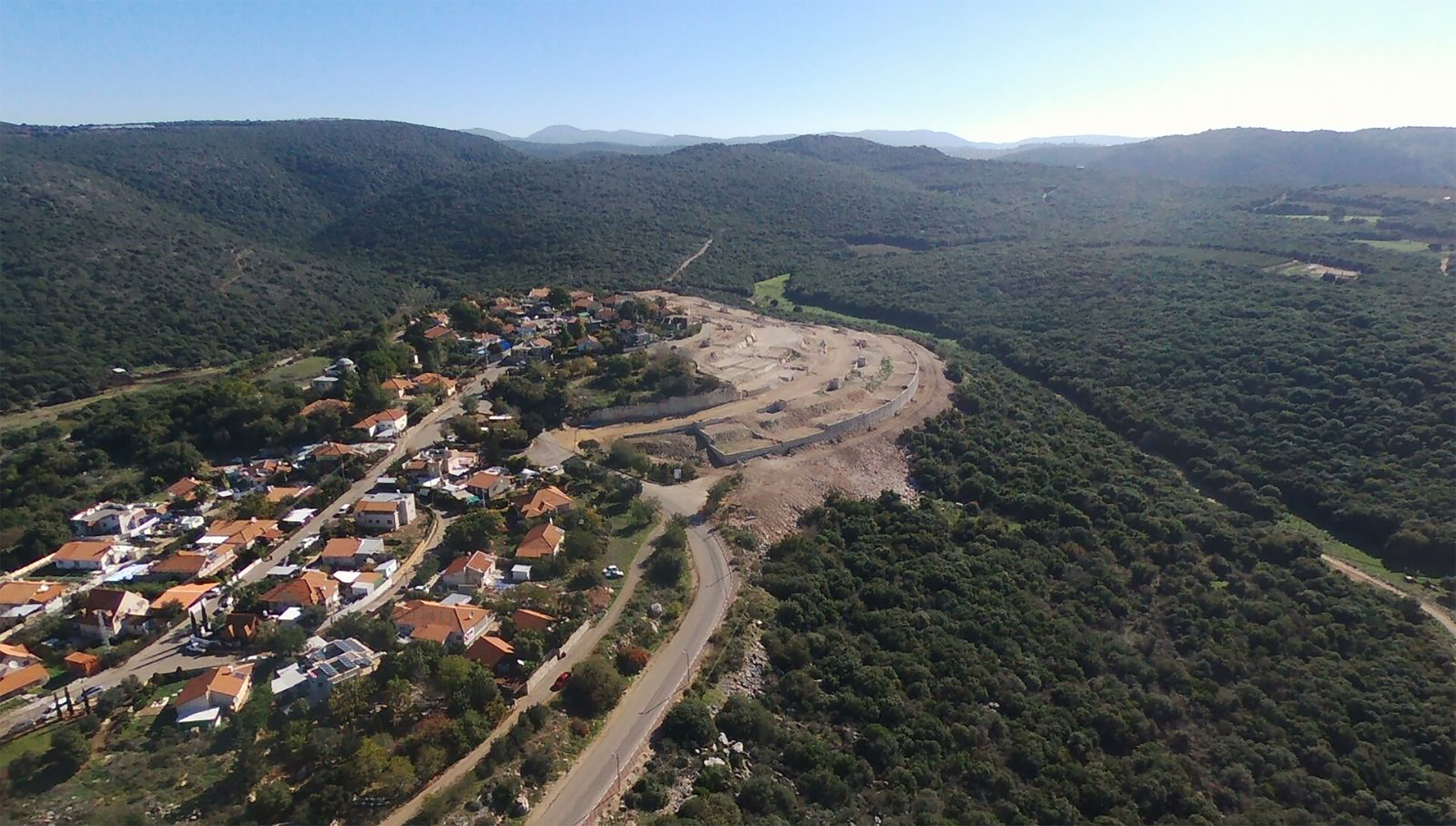

- Location within Northwest Israel Location within Israel
- Coordinates: 33°3′37″N 35°14′56″E
- Country: Israel
- District: Northern
- Subdistrict: Acre
- Council: Ma'ale Yosef
- Founded: 1980
- Population (2024): 341

Gornot HaGalil (Hebrew: גָּרְנוֹת הַגָּלִיל, lit. 'Granaries of the Galilee') is a community settlement in northern Israel. Located near Ma'alot-Tarshiha, it falls under the jurisdiction of Ma'ale Yosef Regional Council. In 2024 it had a population of 341.

== History ==
The village was established in 1980 by members of families from local moshavim, assisted by the Jewish Agency. Its name is derived from nearby Goren. The land the village was built on is located near the former Arab village of Iqrit, which was depopulated by the Israel Defense Forces during the 1948 Arab–Israeli War.

It was originally designed to be a municipal center for municipal government offices and regional healthcare center. In addition, many public facilities were planned to be constructed there, such as a sport center, elementary school and a community center.

Children from Gornot HaGalil study in the regional high school "Galil Ma'aravi".
