= Hurfeish =

Hurfeish: חֻרְפֵישׁ, חורפיש; حرفيش
- Local council (from 1967)

Hebrew transcription(s)
  - ISO 259: Ḥurp̄eiš
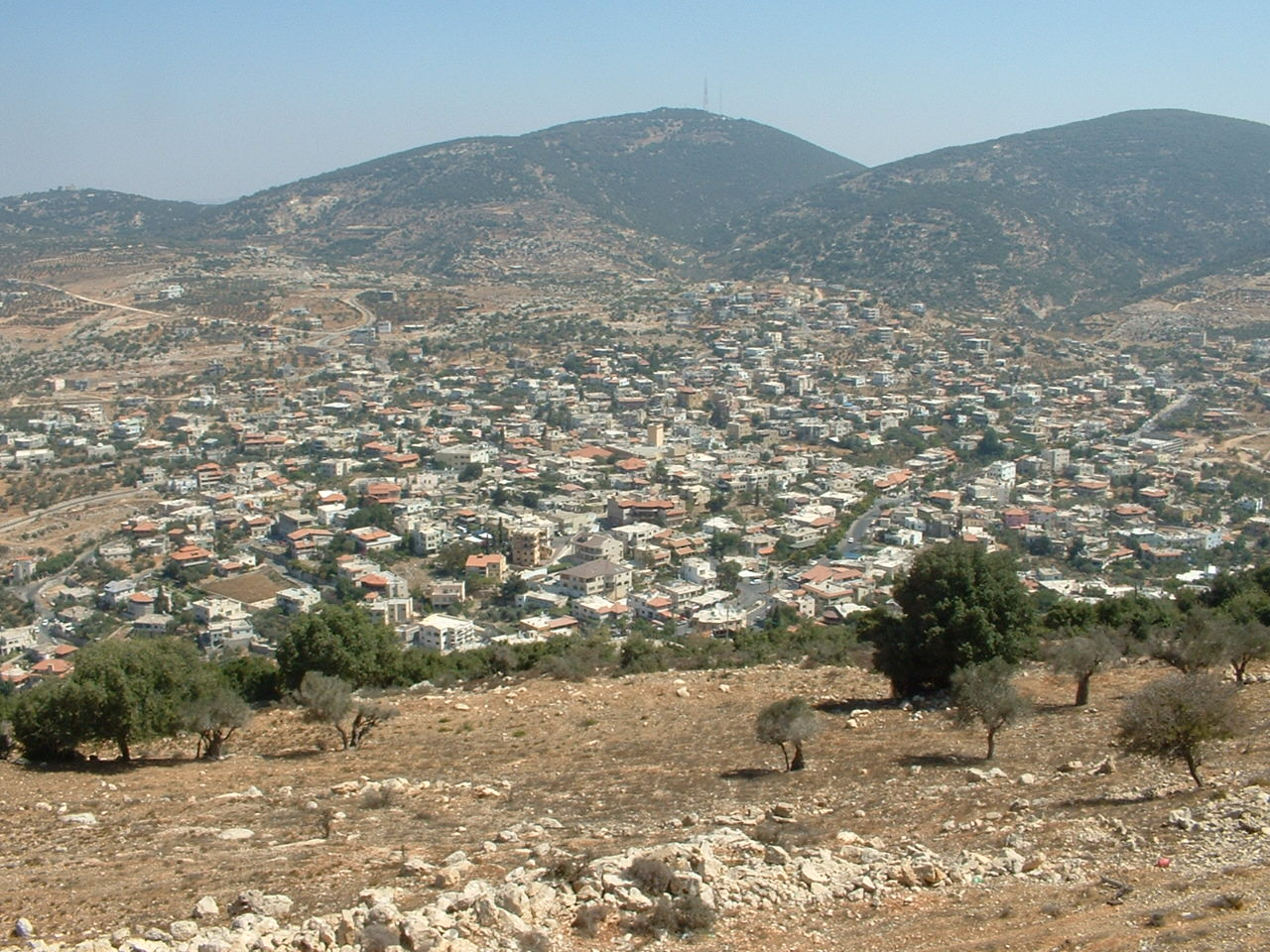

- Location within Northwest Israel Location within Israel
- Coordinates: 33°01′04″N 35°20′46″E
- Grid position: 182/269 PAL
- Country: Israel
- District: Northern
- Subdistrict: Acre
- Natural Region: Elon

Government
  - Head of Municipality: Anwar Amer

Area
  - Total: 4,229 dunams (4.229 km^{2}; 1.633 sq mi)
- Elevation: 700 m (2,300 ft)

Population (2024)
  - Total: 6,877
  - Density: 1,626/km^{2} (4,212/sq mi)
- Name meaning: possibly from "snake"

Hurfeish (Arabic: حرفيش; Hebrew: חֻרְפֵישׁ; lit. "milk thistle" or possibly from "snake") is a Druze town in the Northern District of Israel. In 2024 it had a population of 6,877.

== History ==
The town is situated on an ancient site, where mosaics and Greek inscriptions have been excavated.

In the Crusader era, Hurfeish was known as Horfeis, Hourfex, Orpheis, or Orfeis. In 1183 it was part of an estate sold from Geoffrey le Tor to Count Jocelyn III. In 1220 Jocelyn III´s daughter Beatrix de Courtenay and her husband Otto von Botenlauben, Count of Henneberg, sold the estate to the Teutonic Knights. It was listed as still belonging to the Teutonic Knights in 1226.

=== Ottoman Empire ===
In 1596 the village appeared under the name of Hurfays in the Ottoman tax registers as part of the nahiya (subdistrict) of Jira, part of Safad Sanjak. It had an all Muslim population, consisting of 41 households and 10 bachelors. They paid taxes on goats and beehives, in addition to occasional revenues; but the largest amount was a fixed tax of 6,000 akçe; the taxes totalled 6,930 akçe. All of the revenue went to a Waqf.

In 1838, Harfish was noted as a Christian and Druze village in the El Jebel district, located west of Safad.

In 1875 Victor Guérin noted an ancient church, used by the 50 Greek Christians in the village. In addition, Hurfeish had 300 Druze inhabitants. In 1881, the PEF's Survey of Western Palestine (SWP) described Hurfeish as "a village, built of stone, containing about 150 Christians, situated on a low ridge, with figs, olives, and arable land. There are few wells in the village, and four good springs on the south side."

A population list from about 1887 showed Hurfeish to have about 645 inhabitants; 115 Christians and 530 Muslims.

=== British Mandate ===
In the 1922 census of Palestine, conducted by the British Mandate authorities, Hurfeish had a total population of 412; 386 Druze and 26 Christians. The latter were all Melkites (Greek Catholic). The population increased in the 1931 census to 527; 18 Muslims, 35 Christians and 474 Druze, living in a total of 110 houses.

In the 1945 statistics, it had a population of 830; 20 Muslims, 30 Christians and 780 classified as "others", (i.e. Druze), with a total of 16,904 dunums of land. Of this, 1,039 was plantations and irrigable land, 2,199 was allocated to cereals, while 91 dunams were classified as built-up (urban) land.

=== Israel ===
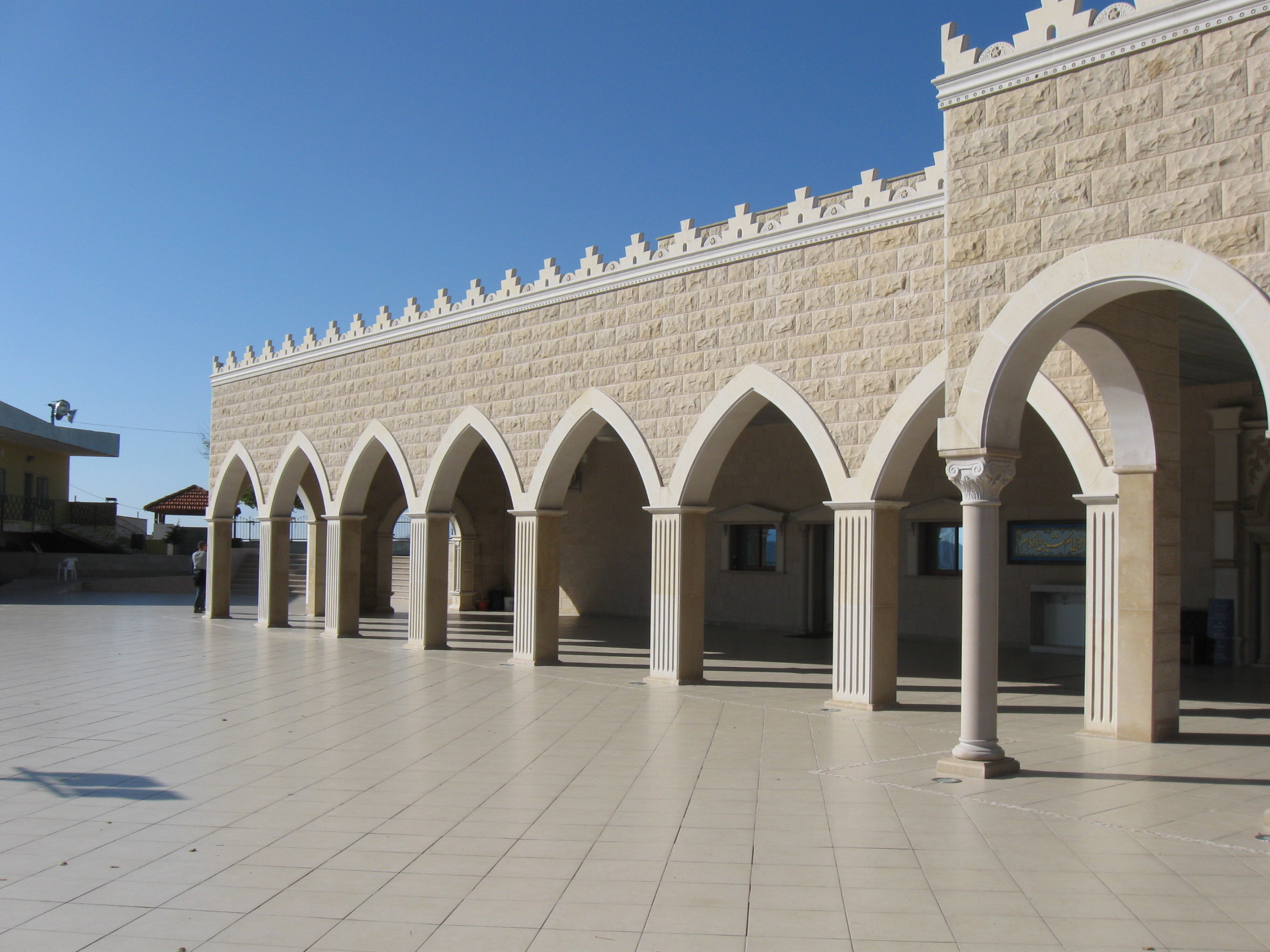
Shrine of Sabalan

Hurfeish surrendered to the advancing Israeli army during Operation Hiram, October 1948. An IDF plan, December 1949, to expel the population was blocked by the Foreign Ministry.

Hurfeish was declared a local council in 1967. According to the Israel Central Bureau of Statistics (CBS) it had a total population of 5,200 in 2006, with a growth rate of 1.9%. As in 2014, the majority of residents was Druze (96%), with a small number of Christians (3.2%) and Muslims (0.3%). A large percentage of the population are police and army officers, serving with the Israel Police and the Israel Defense Forces.

On June 5, 2024, Hurfeish was directly struck by at least two explosive drones launched by Hezbollah. 11 people were injured, some of whom sustaining serious injuries.

== Demographics ==
Historical population
Year	Pop.	±%
1972	1,800	—
1983	2,800	+55.6%
1995	4,200	+50.0%
2008	5,400	+28.6%
2022	6,544	+21.2%
2024	6,876	+5.1%

In 2022, 96.9% of the population was Druze, 2.9% was Christian and 0.2% was Muslim.

== Landmarks ==
According to the tradition, Sabalan, a Druze prophet, often identified with the Biblical Zebulon, escaped to a cave after he failed to convert Hebron residents to the new religion, then he continued to teach the religion and also built by himself a room over the site of the cave. It is located in Hurfeish, on the top of Mount Zvul.

== Voting Patterns ==
In the 2022 election, 88 percent of voters in Hurfeish voted for the parties of the center-left coalition led by Yair Lapid, while 6 percent voted for the parties of the right-wing coalition led by Benjamin Netanyahu and 4 percent voted for the Arab parties.

In the 2026 election, 74 percent of voters in Hurfeish voted for the parties of the center-left coalition led by Gadi Eisenkot, while 12 percent voted for the parties of the right-wing coalition led by Benjamin Netanyahu and 4 percent voted for the Arab parties. An additional 3.3 percent voted for the Reservists, and 7 percent voted for Amcha Yisrael. Voter turnout increased 22 percent from the 2022 election.

== See also ==
- Druze in Israel

== Bibliography ==
- Barron, J.B., ed. (1923). Palestine: Report and General Abstracts of the Census of 1922. Government of Palestine.
- Conder, C.R.; Kitchener, H.H. (1881). The Survey of Western Palestine: Memoirs of the Topography, Orography, Hydrography, and Archaeology. Vol. 1. London: Committee of the Palestine Exploration Fund.
- Dauphin, C. (1998). La Palestine byzantine, Peuplement et Populations. BAR International Series 726 (in French). Vol. III : Catalogue. Oxford: Archeopress. ISBN 0-860549-05-4.
- Government of Palestine, Department of Statistics (1945). Village Statistics, April, 1945.
- Guérin, V. (1880). Description Géographique Historique et Archéologique de la Palestine (in French). Vol. 3: Galilee, pt. 2. Paris: L'Imprimerie Nationale.
- Hadawi, S. (1970). Village Statistics of 1945: A Classification of Land and Area ownership in Palestine. Palestine Liberation Organization Research Center.
- Hütteroth, W.-D.; Abdulfattah, K. (1977). Historical Geography of Palestine, Transjordan and Southern Syria in the Late 16th Century. Erlanger Geographische Arbeiten, Sonderband 5. Erlangen, Germany: Vorstand der Fränkischen Geographischen Gesellschaft. ISBN 3-920405-41-2.
- Mills, E., ed. (1932). Census of Palestine 1931. Population of Villages, Towns and Administrative Areas. Jerusalem: Government of Palestine.
- Morris, B. (1987). The Birth of the Palestinian refugee problem, 1947-1949. Cambridge University Press. ISBN 0-521-33028-9.
- Palmer, E.H. (1881). The Survey of Western Palestine: Arabic and English Name Lists Collected During the Survey by Lieutenants Conder and Kitchener, R. E. Transliterated and Explained by E.H. Palmer. Committee of the Palestine Exploration Fund. p. 72
- Pringle, D. (2009). The Churches of the Crusader Kingdom of Jerusalem: The cities of Acre and Tyre with Addenda and Corrigenda to Volumes I-III. Vol. IV. Cambridge University Press. ISBN 978-0-521-85148-0.
- Rhode, H. (1979). Administration and Population of the Sancak of Safed in the Sixteenth Century (PhD). Columbia University. Archived from the original on 2019-04-20.
- Robinson, E.; Smith, E. (1841). Biblical Researches in Palestine, Mount Sinai and Arabia Petraea: A Journal of Travels in the year 1838. Vol. 3. Boston: Crocker & Brewster.
- Röhricht, R. (1893). (RRH) Regesta regni Hierosolymitani (MXCVII-MCCXCI) (in Latin). Berlin: Libraria Academica Wageriana.
- Schumacher, G. (1888). "Population list of the Liwa of Akka". Quarterly Statement - Palestine Exploration Fund. 20: 169–191.
- Strehlke, E., ed. (1869). Tabulae Ordinis Theutonici ex tabularii regii Berolinensis codice potissimum. Berlin: Weidmanns.
- Vilnay, Z. (1964). The guide to Israel. Ahiever.
