= Tzuriel =

Place in Northern Israel

Tzuriel: צוּרִיאֵל (Hebrew)
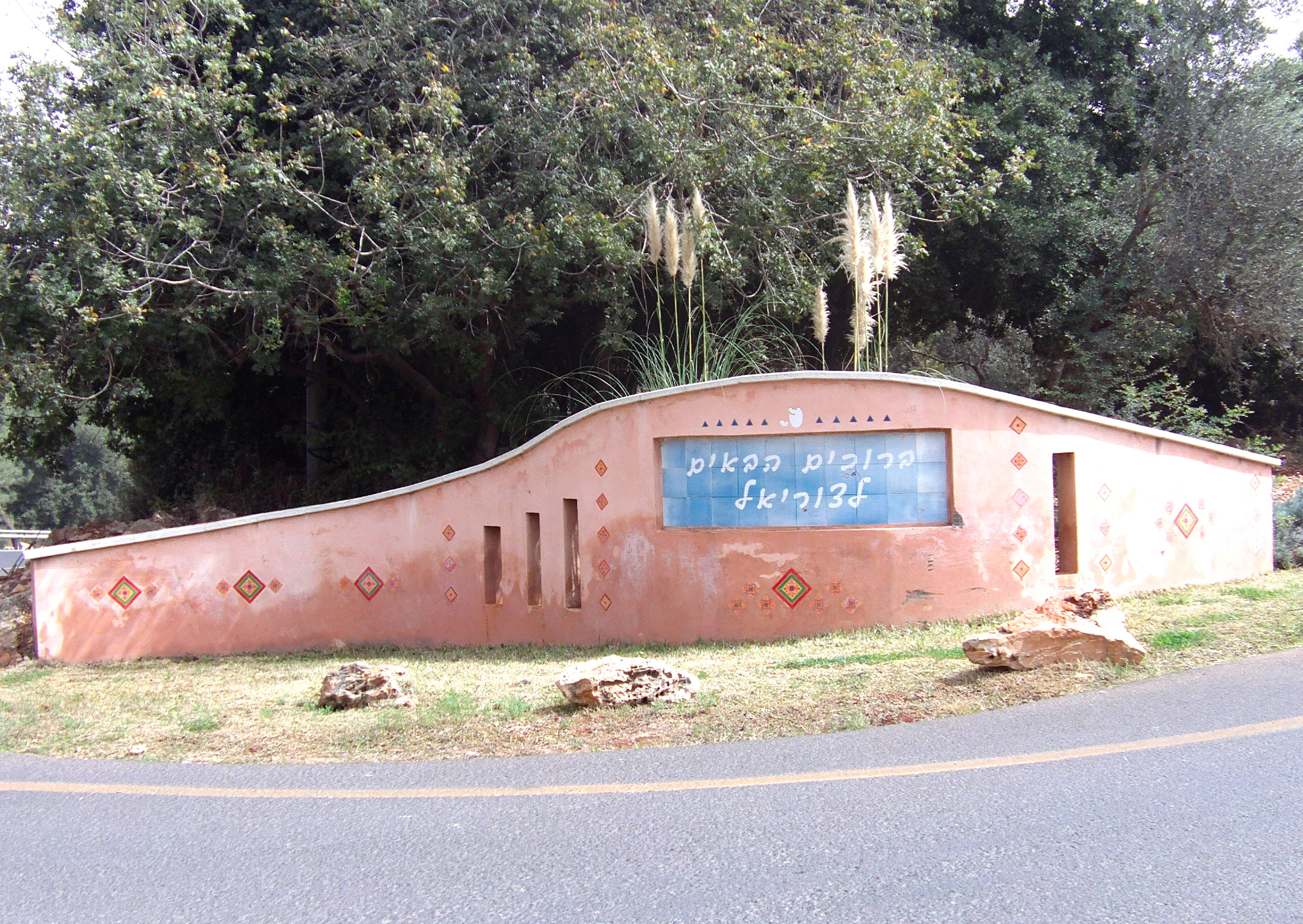
- Village entrance

- Location within Northwest Israel Location within Israel
- Coordinates: 33°0′26″N 35°18′47″E
- Country: Israel
- District: Northern
- Subdistrict: Acre
- Council: Ma'ale Yosef
- Affiliation: Moshavim Movement
- Founded: 1950
- Founder: Yemenite and Adenese Jewish immigrants
- Population (2024): 530

Tzuriel (Hebrew: צוּרִיאֵל) is a moshav in northern Israel. Located in the Galilee, it falls under the jurisdiction of Ma'ale Yosef Regional Council. In 2024 it had a population of 530.

== History ==
The moshav was established in 1949 on land located near the depopulated Palestinian village of Suhmata.

The founders were Yemenite Jews from the town of Beit 'Adaqah, led by spiritual leader Rabbi Shalom Nehorai HaLevi. It was named for the biblical figure Zuriel, son of Abihail (Num 3:35).

After a number of years the founders left and a group of Moroccan immigrants moved in.
