= Ein Ya'akov =

Ein Ya'akov: עֵין יַעֲקֹב (Hebrew)
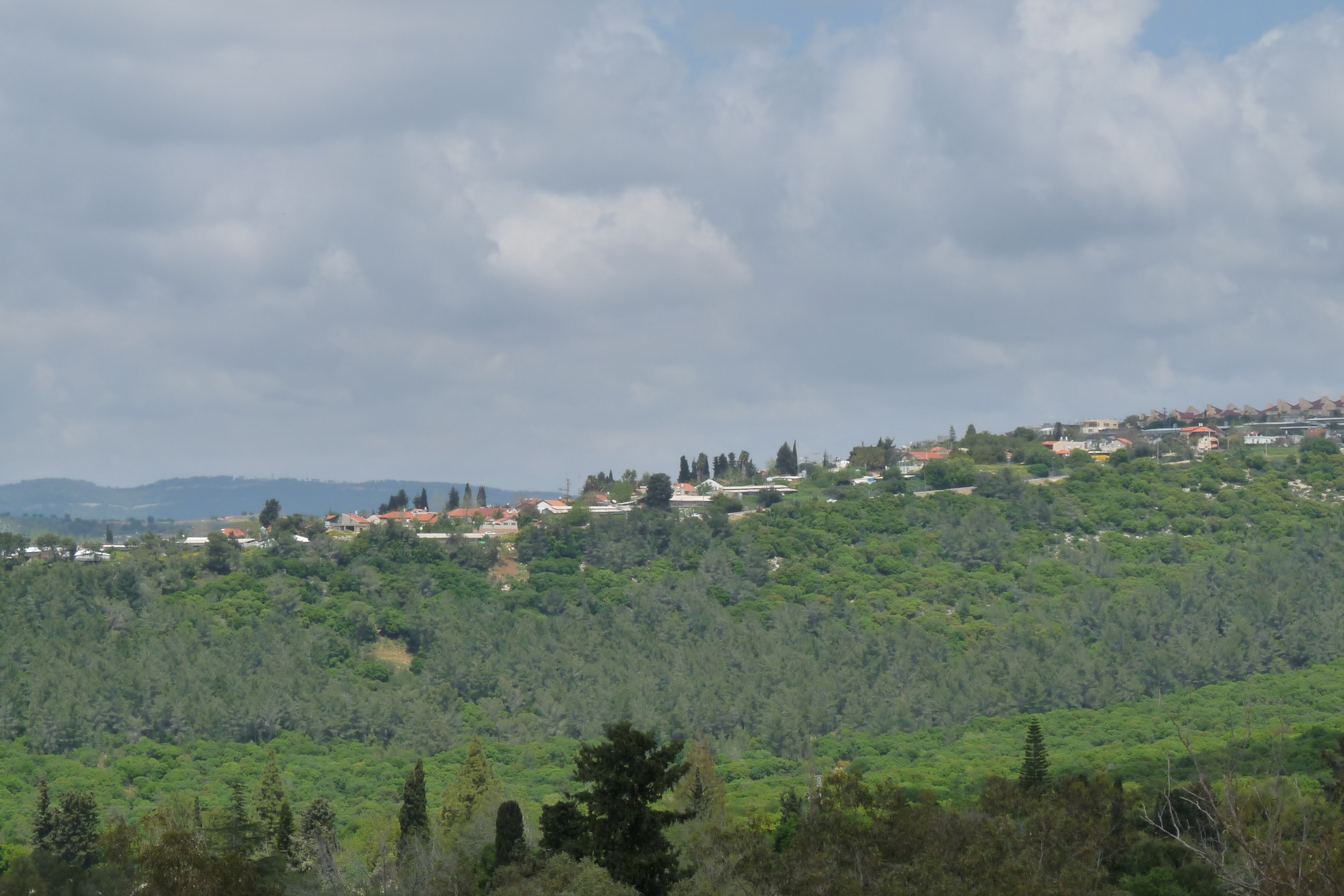
- Etymology: Jacob's spring
- Location within Northwest Israel Location within Israel
- Coordinates: 33°0′37″N 35°13′45″E
- Country: Israel
- District: Northern
- Subdistrict: Acre
- Council: Ma'ale Yosef
- Affiliation: Moshavim Movement
- Founded: 15 October 1950
- Founder: Iraqi and Kurdish Jews
- Population (2024): 1,278

Ein Ya'akov (Hebrew: עֵין יַעֲקֹב, lit. 'Jacob's spring') is a moshav in northern Israel. Located near Ma'alot-Tarshiha, it falls under the jurisdiction of Ma'ale Yosef Regional Council. In 2024 it had a population of 1,278.

== History ==
The village was established on 15 October 1950 by immigrants from Kurdistan and Iraq. Its name (as of the neighbouring moshav Me'ona) is taken from Deuteronomy 33:27–28:

And Israel dwelleth in safety, Jacob's spring is secure, in a land of corn and wine; yea, his heavens drop down dew.
