= Lapidot =

Moshav in northern Israel

Lapidot: לַפִּידוֹת (Hebrew)
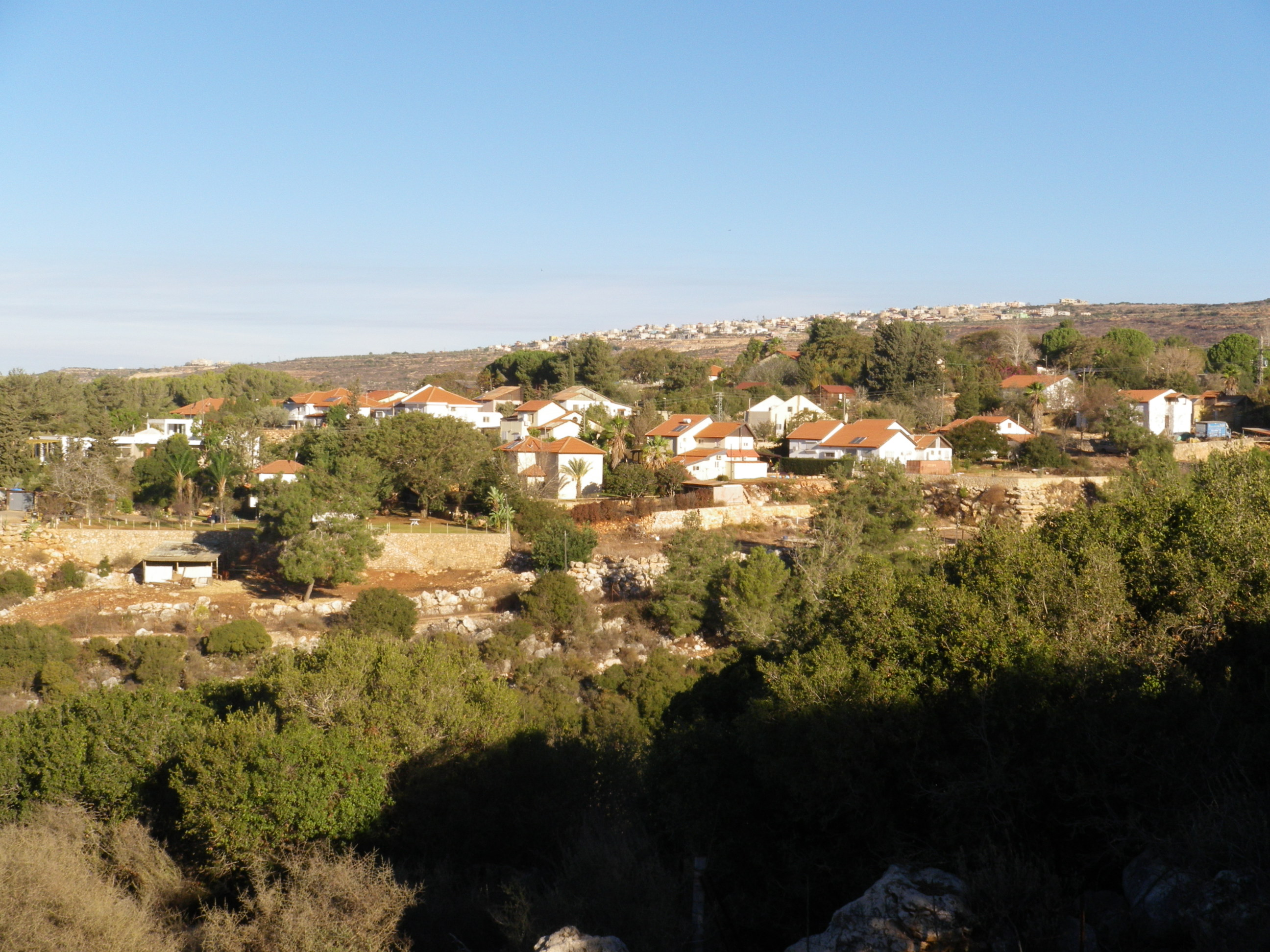

- Location within Northwest Israel Location within Israel
- Coordinates: 32°57′34″N 35°15′42″E
- Country: Israel
- District: Northern
- Subdistrict: Acre
- Council: Ma'ale Yosef
- Affiliation: Moshavim Movement
- Founded: 1978
- Founder: Moshavniks
- Population (2024): 149

Lapidot (Hebrew: לַפִּידוֹת, lit. 'Torches') is a moshav in northern Israel. Located near Karmiel and Ma'alot-Tarshiha, it falls under the jurisdiction of Ma'ale Yosef Regional Council. In 2024 it had a population of 149.

== History ==
The moshav was established in 1978 by residents of other moshavim in the area.

== Economy ==
Most families are poultry farm residents and residents of a private farm (cows and horses). Part of the population earns a living in industrial area of Tefen and Karmiel.

== See also ==
- Amos Lapidot (1934–2019), Israeli fighter pilot, 10th Commander of the Israeli Air Force, and President of Technion – Israel Institute of Technology
