= Me'ona =

Me'ona: מְעוֹנָה (Hebrew)
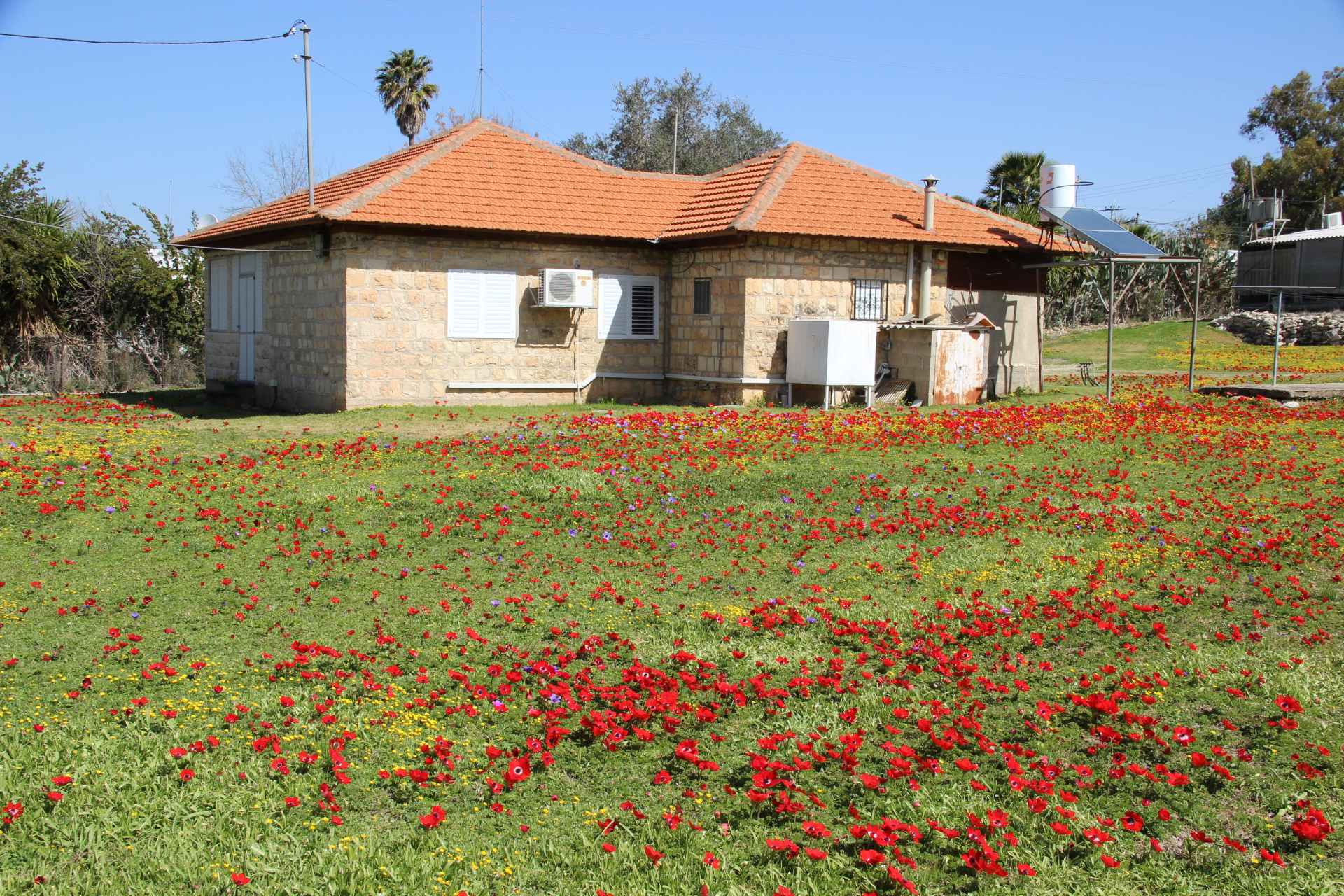

- Location within Northwest Israel
- Coordinates: 33°1′3″N 35°15′31″E
- Country: Israel
- District: Northern
- Subdistrict: Acre
- Council: Ma'ale Yosef
- Affiliation: Moshavim Movement
- Founded: 1949
- Founder: North African and Romanian Jews
- Population (2024): 1,091

Me'ona (Hebrew: מְעוֹנָה, lit. 'Refuge place') is a moshav in northern Israel. Located between Ma'alot-Tarshiha and Nahariya, it falls under the jurisdiction of Ma'ale Yosef Regional Council. In 2024 it had a population of 1,091.

== History ==
The village was established in 1949 by Jewish immigrants and refugees from North Africa and Jews from Romania. Its name (as of the neighbouring moshav Ein Ya'akov) is taken from Deuteronomy 33:27-28:

The Eternal Lord is Your refuge place ...
