= Yarka =

Druze town in northern Israel

Yarka: יִרְכָּא; يركا
- Local council

Hebrew transcription(s)
  - Also spelled: Yirka (official)
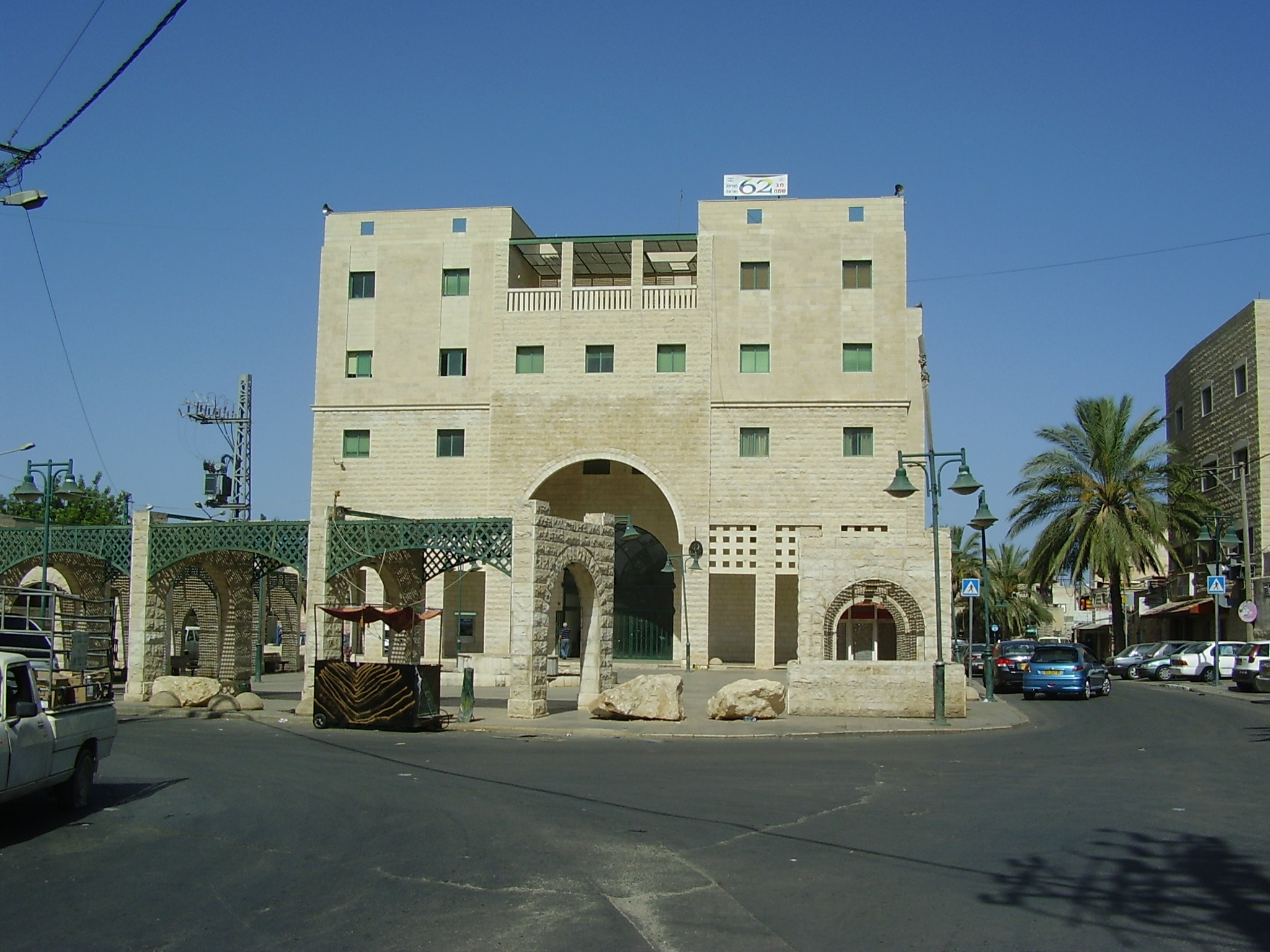
- Yarka local council building

- Location within Northwest Israel Location within Israel
- Coordinates: 32°57′14″N 35°12′44″E
- Grid position: 170/261 PAL
- Country: Israel
- District: Northern
- Subdistrict: Acre
- Natural Region: Yehi'am

Area
  - Total: 15,564 dunams (15.564 km^{2}; 6.009 sq mi)

Population (2024)
  - Total: 16,823
  - Density: 1,080.9/km^{2} (2,799.5/sq mi)

Yarka, officially Yirka (Hebrew: יִרְכָּא, Arabic: يركا), is a Druze village and local council in the Northern District of Israel. In 2019 it had a population of 17,171, 98.8% of them members of the Druze community, with small Muslim (1.0%) and Christian (0.1%) minorities.

== History ==
=== Ancient era ===
Yarka is an ancient village site, where old columns and cisterns have been found. A Greek inscription here dating from the early Christian era was found by Clermont-Ganneau in 1881.

=== Crusader period ===
During the Crusader era, Yarka was known under the name of Arket. In 1220, Joscelin III's daughter Beatrix de Courtenay and her husband Otto von Botenlauben, Count of Henneberg, sold their land, including Arket, to the Teutonic Knights.

=== Ottoman era ===
In 1517, Yarka was incorporated into the Ottoman Empire after Palestine was captured from the Mamluks. By 1596, Yarka appeared in the Ottoman tax registers as part of the Nahiya of Akka of the Liwa of Safad. It had a population of 174 Muslim households and 24 bachelors.

A map by Pierre Jacotin from Napoleon's invasion of 1799 showed the town under the name Hierka.

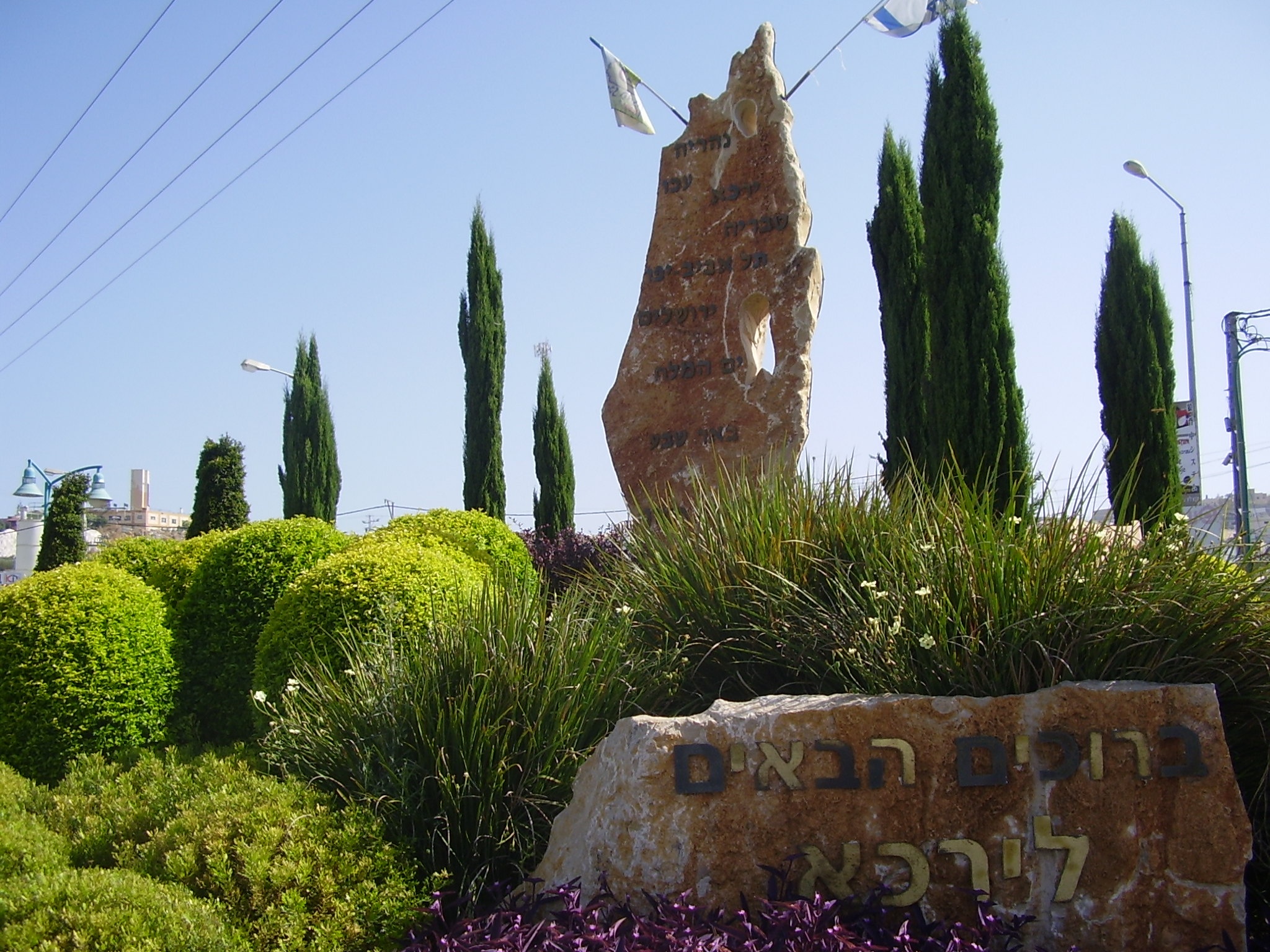
Entrance to Yarka

The French explorer Victor Guérin visited Yarka in 1875, and wrote that "cut stones of ancient appearance have been used in building the modern houses. [...] About a hundred cisterns cut in rock, a half of which are no longer used, and the other half serve for the wants of the people, reveal the existence in this place of an ancient locality of some importance." In 1881, the Palestine Exploration Fund's Survey of Western Palestine described Yarka as a well-built stone village inhabited by 400 Druze who grew olives and figs.

A population list from about 1887 showed that Yerka had about 1,285 inhabitants; virtually all Druze.

=== British Mandate era ===
In the 1922 census of Palestine conducted by the British Mandate authorities, Yarka had a population of 978 residents; 937 Druze, 26 Muslims, and 15 Christians, where the Christians were 11 Orthodox, 3 Roman Catholics, and 1 Maronite. The population increased in the 1931 census to 1,196; 1,138 Druze, 46 Muslims, and 11 Christians living in a total of 343 houses.

According to an official land and population survey, Yarka had a population of 1,500 in 1945; 70 Muslims, 10 Christians, and 1420 Druze, encapsulating with 42,452 dunams of land. Of this, 5,747 dunams were plantations and irrigable land, 5,909 used for cereal, while 140 dunams were built-up land in 1945.

== Religious sites ==
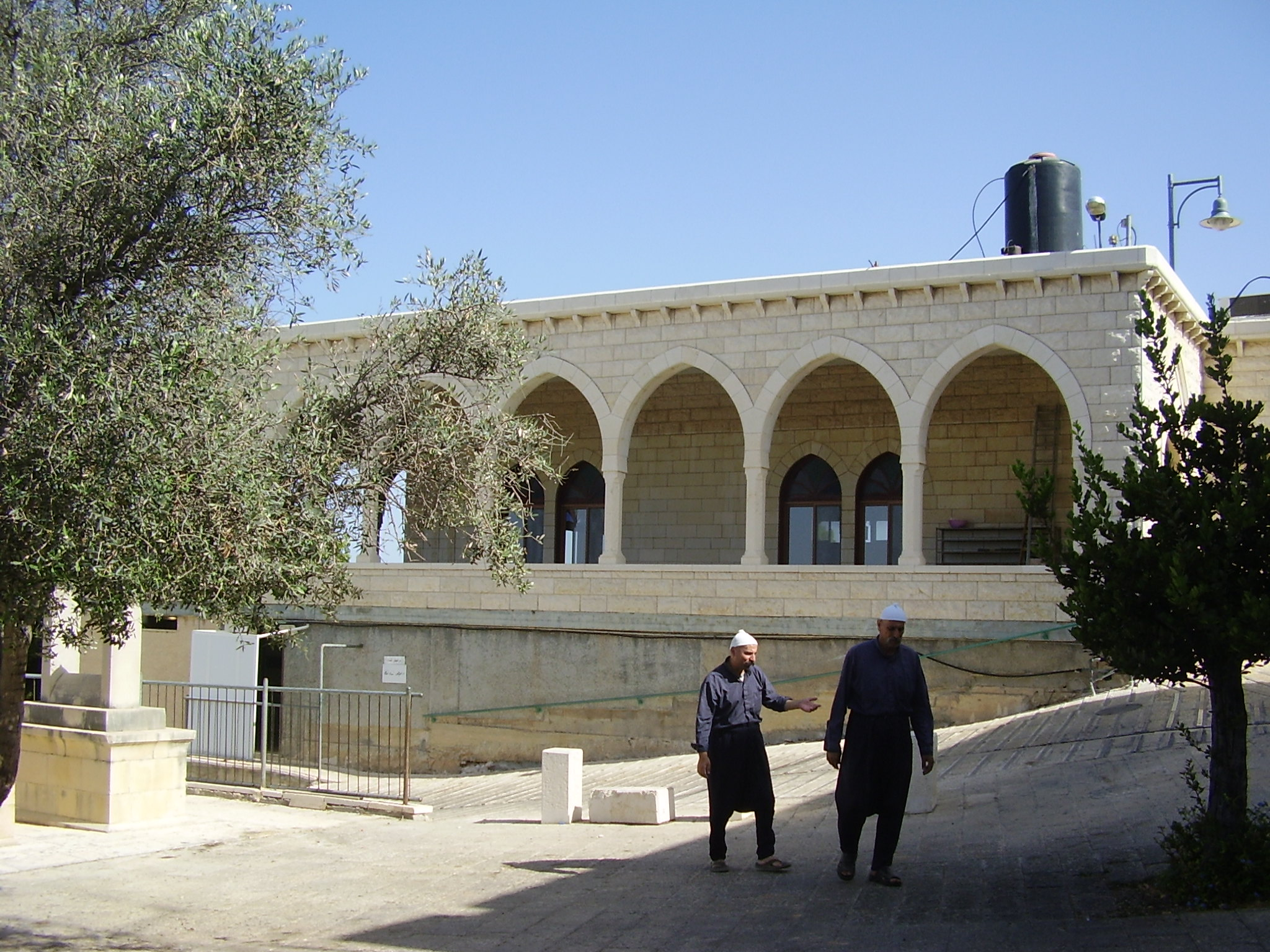
Hilwah, (praying house), in Yarka

Yarka contains the maqam ("saintly-person tomb") of Shaykh Ghana'im Abu Saraya, a native of the town and one of the first missionary sheikhs to spread the Druze faith in Galilee during the 11th century. He was the principal Druze sheikh in the Acre coastal area. Druze tradition has it that Abu Saraya is buried underneath the floor of the shrine.

The town is also the site of the al-Nabi Siddiq maqam. The Druze associate al-Nabi Siddiq with the biblical figure Hushai. According to this tradition, the name "Yarka" derives from "ha-Arki". The Druze prayer house "Khalwah ash-Sheikh Muhammad" is situated just east of Yarka. It was built sometime prior to 1931 by the religious sheikh Muhammad Mu'addi as a center for Druze religious studies.

== Economy ==
Yarka houses Kadmani Metal Works, Inc., now defunct. My Baby, Israel's largest store for children's and baby's supplies, with 11,000 meters of retail space, is also stationed in Yarka. The store has an annual turnover of NIS 100 million ($27.1 million USD).

== Demographics ==
Historical population
Year	Pop.	±%
1972	4,400	—
1983	6,500	+47.7%
1995	9,800	+50.8%
2008	14,500	+48.0%
2022	16,194	+11.7%
2024	16,823	+3.9%

== Voting Patterns ==
In the 2022 election, 53 percent of voters in Yarka voted for the parties of the center-left coalition led by Yair Lapid, while 35 percent voted for the parties of the right-wing coalition led by Benjamin Netanyahu and 10 percent voted for the Arab parties.

In the 2026 election, 61 percent of voters in Yarka voted for the parties of the center-left coalition led by Gadi Eisenkot, while 32 percent voted for the parties of the right-wing coalition led by Benjamin Netanyahu and 5 percent voted for the Arab parties. An additional 0.9 percent voted for the Reservists, and 0.3 percent voted for Amcha Yisrael. Voter turnout increased 34 percent from the 2022 election.

== Notable residents ==
- Jabr Muadi

== See also ==
- Druze in Israel
- Nahal Zoch

== Bibliography ==
- Abu Izzedin, Nejla M. (1993). The Druzes: A New Study of Their History, Faith, and Society. Leiden: Brill. ISBN 978-90-04-09705-6.
- Barag, Dan (1979). "A new source concerning the ultimate borders of the Latin Kingdom of Jerusalem". Israel Exploration Journal. 29: 197–217.
- Barron, J. B., ed. (1923). Palestine: Report and General Abstracts of the Census of 1922. Government of Palestine.
- Clermont-Ganneau, C. S. (1881). "Note IV by Clermont-Ganneau". Quarterly Statement - Palestine Exploration Fund. 13: 37–38.
- Conder, C. R.; Kitchener, H. H. (1881). The Survey of Western Palestine: Memoirs of the Topography, Orography, Hydrography, and Archaeology. Vol. 1. London: Committee of the Palestine Exploration Fund. (p. 152)
- Dana, Nissim (2003). The Druze in the Middle East: Their Faith, Leadership, Identity and Status. Sussex Academic Press. ISBN 978-1903900369.
- Dauphin, C. (1998). La Palestine byzantine, Peuplement et Populations. BAR International Series 726 (in French). Vol. III : Catalogue. Oxford: Archeopress. ISBN 978-0-860549-05-5.
- Department of Statistics (1945). Village Statistics, April, 1945. Government of Palestine.
- Frankel, Rafael (1988). "Topographical notes on the territory of Acre in the Crusader period". Israel Exploration Journal. 38 (4): 249–272. JSTOR 27926125.
- Guérin, V. (1880). Description Géographique Historique et Archéologique de la Palestine (in French). Vol. 3: Galilee, pt. 2. Paris: L'Imprimerie Nationale.
- Hadawi, S. (1970). Village Statistics of 1945: A Classification of Land and Area ownership in Palestine. Palestine Liberation Organization Research Center.
- Hütteroth, W.-D.; Abdulfattah, K. (1977). Historical Geography of Palestine, Transjordan and Southern Syria in the Late 16th Century. Erlanger Geographische Arbeiten, Sonderband 5. Erlangen, Germany: Vorstand der Fränkischen Geographischen Gesellschaft. ISBN 978-3-920405-41-4.
- Karmon, Y. (1960). "An Analysis of Jacotin's Map of Palestine" (PDF). Israel Exploration Journal. 10 (3, 4): 155–173, 244–253. Archived from the original (PDF) on 2017-12-01.
- Mills, E., ed. (1932). Census of Palestine 1931. Population of Villages, Towns and Administrative Areas. Jerusalem: Government of Palestine.
- Palmer, E. H. (1881). The Survey of Western Palestine: Arabic and English Name Lists Collected During the Survey by Lieutenants Conder and Kitchener, R. E. Transliterated and Explained by E.H. Palmer. Committee of the Palestine Exploration Fund.
- Rhode, H. (1979). Administration and Population of the Sancak of Safed in the Sixteenth Century. Columbia University. Archived from the original on 2020-03-01.
- Röhricht, R. (1893). (RRH) Regesta regni Hierosolymitani (MXCVII-MCCXCI) (in Latin). Berlin: Libraria Academica Wageriana.
- Schumacher, G. (1888). "Population list of the Liwa of Akka". Quarterly Statement - Palestine Exploration Fund. 20: 169–191.
- Strehlke, E., ed. (1869). Tabulae Ordinis Theutonici ex tabularii regii Berolinensis codice potissimum. Berlin: Weidmanns.
- Swayd, Sami (2009). The A to Z of the Druzes. Rowman & Littlefield. ISBN 978-0810868366.
- Thomson, W. M. (1859). The Land and the Book: Or, Biblical Illustrations Drawn from the Manners and Customs, the Scenes and Scenery, of the Holy Land. Vol. 1 (1 ed.). New York: Harper & brothers. (p. 463)
