= Avdon =

Avdon: עבדון (Hebrew)
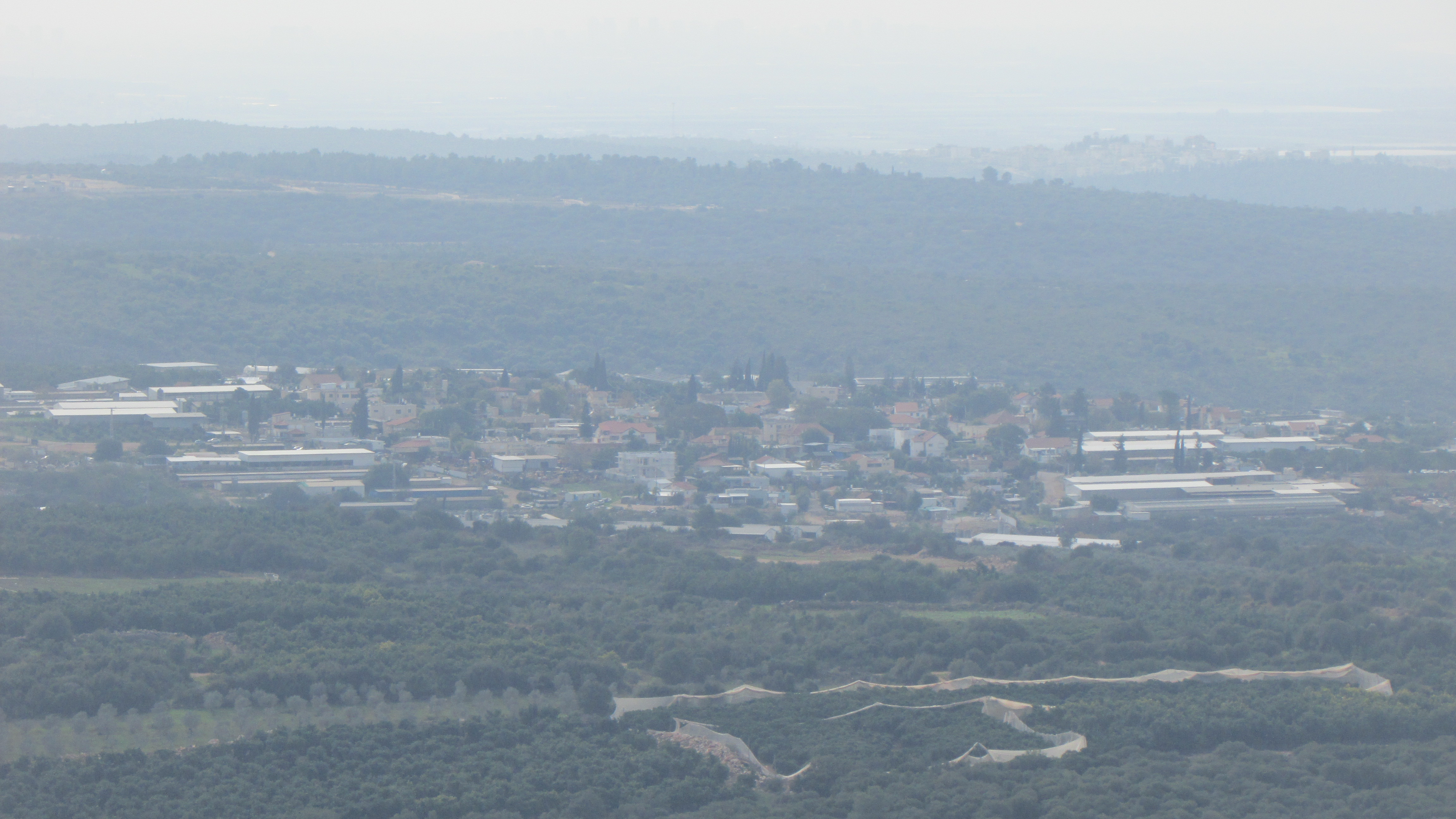

- Location within Northwest Israel Location within Israel
- Coordinates: 33°02′54″N 35°10′50″E
- Country: Israel
- District: Northern
- Subdistrict: Acre
- Council: Ma'ale Yosef
- Affiliation: Moshavim Movement
- Founded: 1952
- Founder: Persian and Tunisian Jews
- Population (2024): 687

Avdon (Hebrew: עַבְדּוֹן) is a moshav in northern Israel. Located near Shlomi, it falls under the jurisdiction of Ma'ale Yosef Regional Council. In 2024 it had a population of 687.

== History ==
The village was established in 1952 by immigrants from Iran and Tunisia, and was initially named Kfar Avdon (lit. Avdon Village) after the biblical city of Abdon in the lades of the Asher tribe (Joshua 21:30), which was located in the area. Immigrants from the Azerbaijan region of Iran living on the moshav were commissioned to design brightly colored rugs in floral motifs which were sold by Maskit, an outlet for Israeli designed fashion and handicrafts established by Ruth Dayan in the 1950s.

Farms in Avdon grow avocado, lychee and bananas.
