= Peki'in HaHadasha =

Moshav in northern Israel

Peki'in HaHadasha: פְּקִיעִין החֲדָשָׁה (Hebrew)
- Location within Northwest Israel Location within Israel
- Coordinates: 32°58′58″N 35°19′37″E
- Country: Israel
- District: Northern
- Subdistrict: Acre
- Council: Ma'ale Yosef
- Founded: 1955
- Founder: Moroccan Jews
- Population (2024): 749

Peki'in HaHadasha (Hebrew: פְּקִיעִין החֲדָשָׁה, lit. 'New Peki'in') is a moshav in northern Israel. Located near Peki'in, it falls under the jurisdiction of Ma'ale Yosef Regional Council. In 2024 it had a population of 749.

== History ==
The moshav was established in 1955 by two gar'ins of Jewish immigrants from Morocco at the initiative of President Yitzhak Ben-Zvi. The first group arrived in February, and was made up of former residents of Casablanca, Fes, Melilla and Rabat. The second group arrived in October, and was composed of immigrants from Larache, Tangier and Tétouan.
