= Abirim =

Community settlement in northern Israel

Abirim: אבירים (Hebrew)
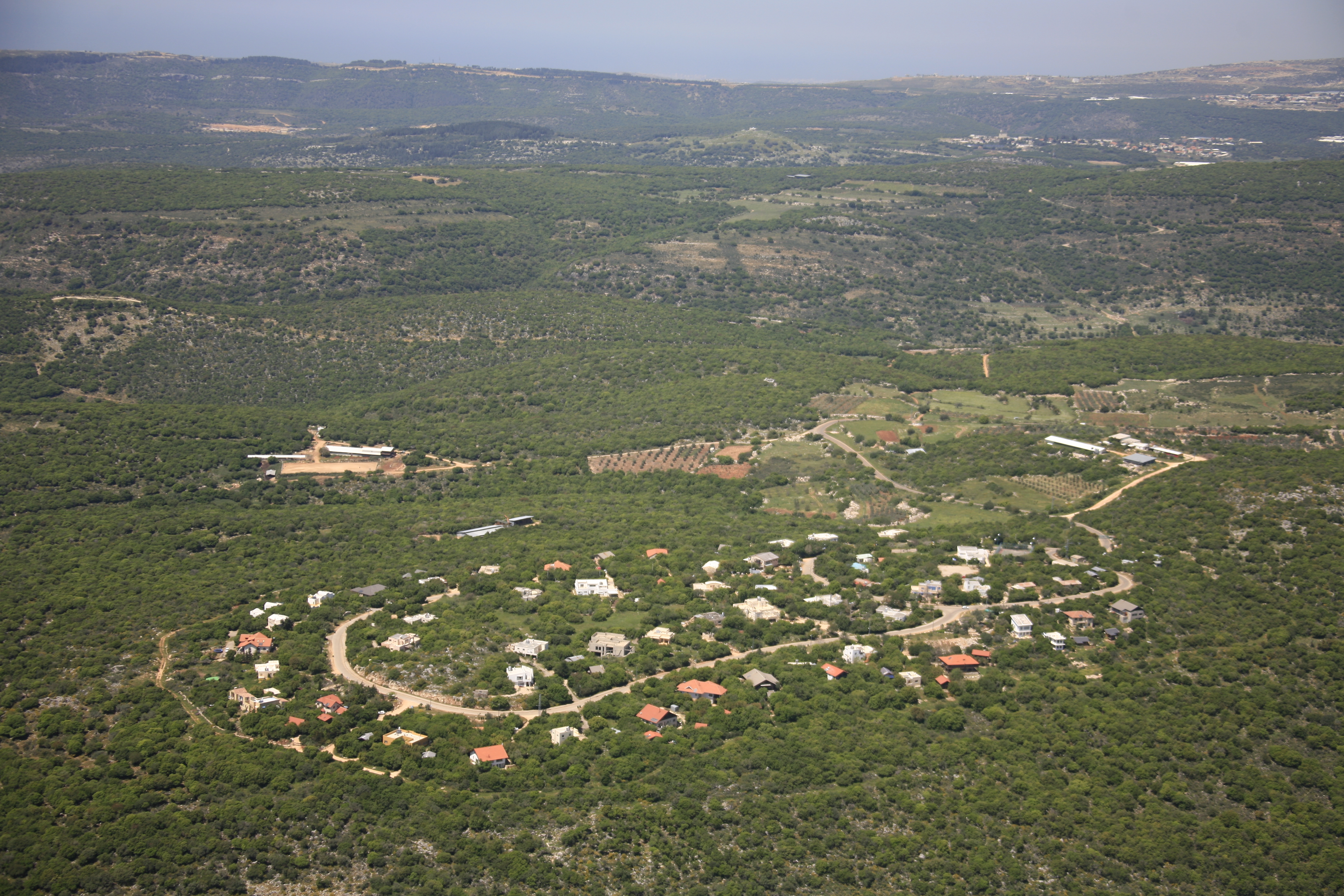
- Etymology: Knights
- Location within Northwest Israel Location within Israel
- Coordinates: 33°2′22″N 35°17′15″E
- Country: Israel
- District: Northern
- Subdistrict: Acre
- Council: Ma'ale Yosef
- Founded: 1980
- Population (2024): 304
- Website: abirim.info

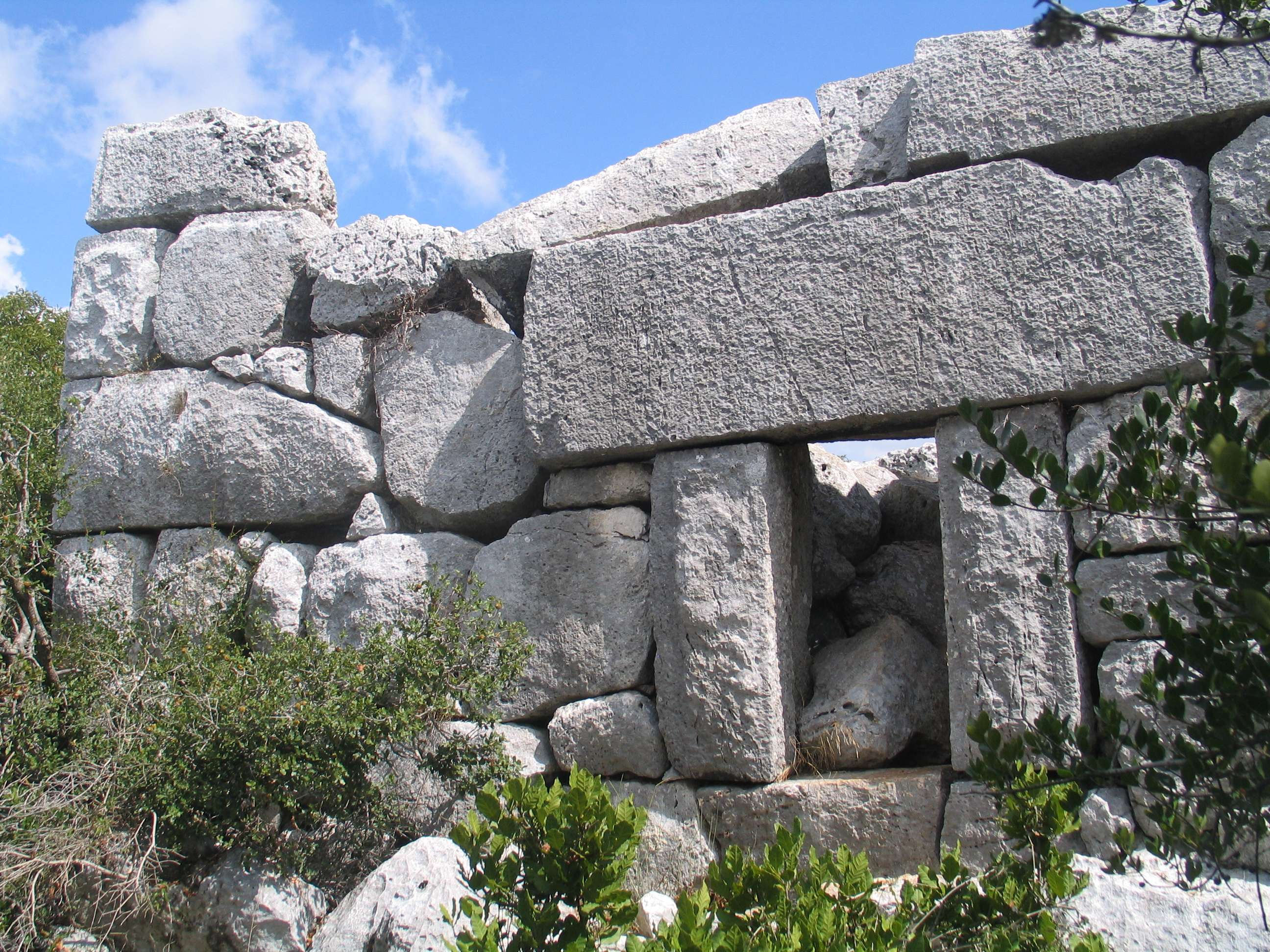
Metsad Abirim, a ruin of tower or mausoleum near Abirim

Abirim (Hebrew: אבירים, lit. 'Knights'), also known as Mitzpe Abirim, is a community settlement in northern Israel. Located in the Upper Galilee, three kilometres from Ma'alot-Tarshiha, it falls under the jurisdiction of Ma'ale Yosef Regional Council. In 2024 it had a population of 304. It is located in the middle of a natural oak forest bordering the Nahal Kziv nature reserve.

== History ==
Abirim was established in 1980 on land located near the Christian town of Fassuta. It was initially named "Eder" and then renamed to "Abirim" after the nearby ruins of Burj Misr (Arabic: "Egyptian Tower"), which was renamed to Horbat Metsad Abirim (Hebrew: "Ruin of the Fortress of the Knights") in 1957. The age and original purpose of the ruins is unknown; proposals range from a Crusader stronghold to a mausoleum from the Hellenistic period (4th–3rd centuries BCE).

== See also ==
- Israeli wine
