= Manot, Israel =

Manot: מָנוֹת (Hebrew)
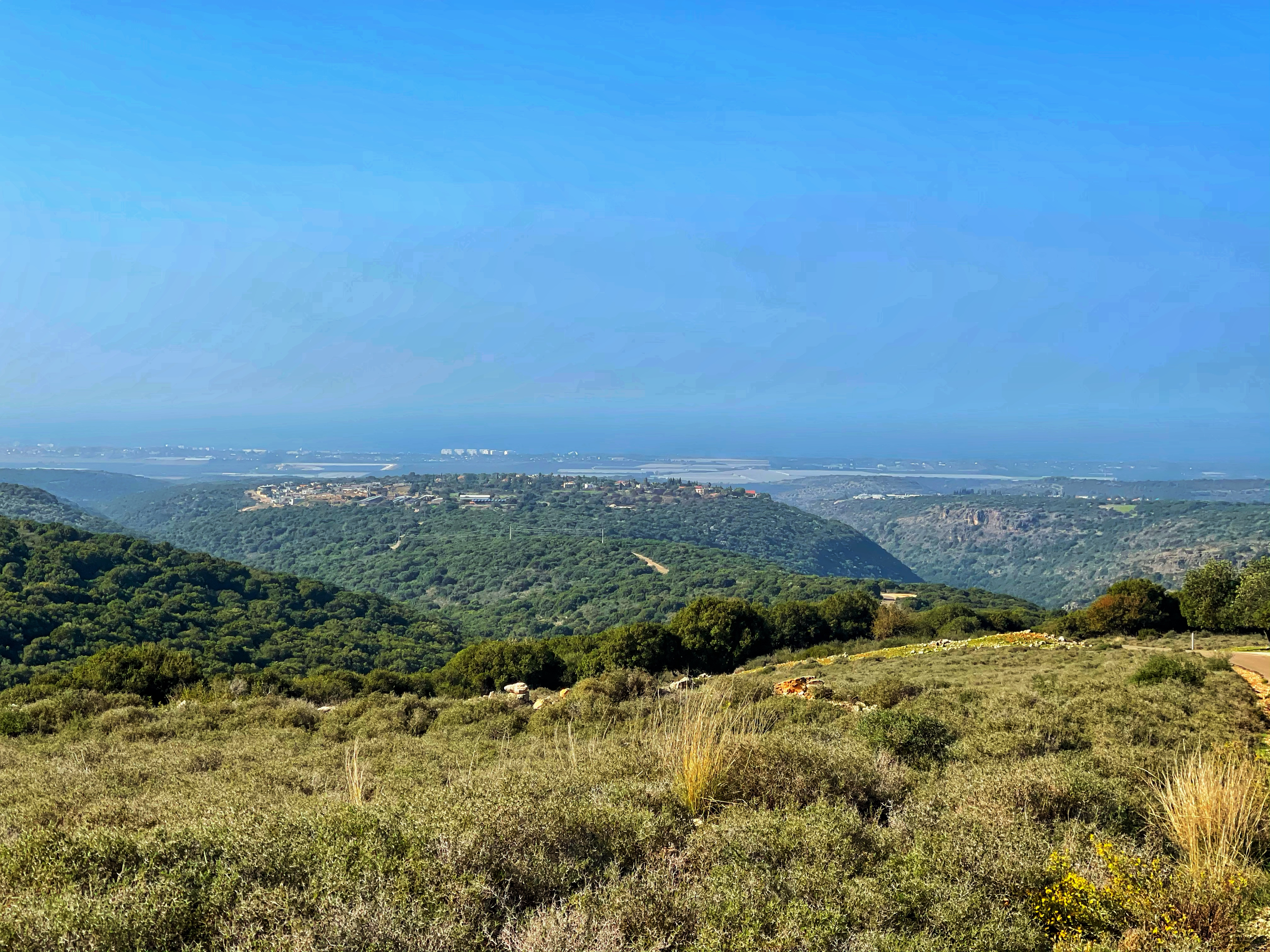

- Location within Northwest Israel
- Coordinates: 33°2′19″N 35°11′43″E
- Country: Israel
- District: Northern
- Subdistrict: Acre
- Council: Ma'ale Yosef
- Affiliation: Moshavim Movement
- Founded: 1980
- Founder: Moshavniks
- Population (2024): 585

Manot (Hebrew: מָנוֹת, lit. 'Portions') is a moshav in northern Israel. Located near Shlomi, it falls under the jurisdiction of Ma'ale Yosef Regional Council. In 2024 it had a population of 585.

== History ==
The moshav was established in 1980 by residents of other local moshavim, with assistance from the Jewish Agency. It was named after the ruins of a Crusader-era settlement in the area, Hurvat Manot, where remains of sugar refinery have been found.

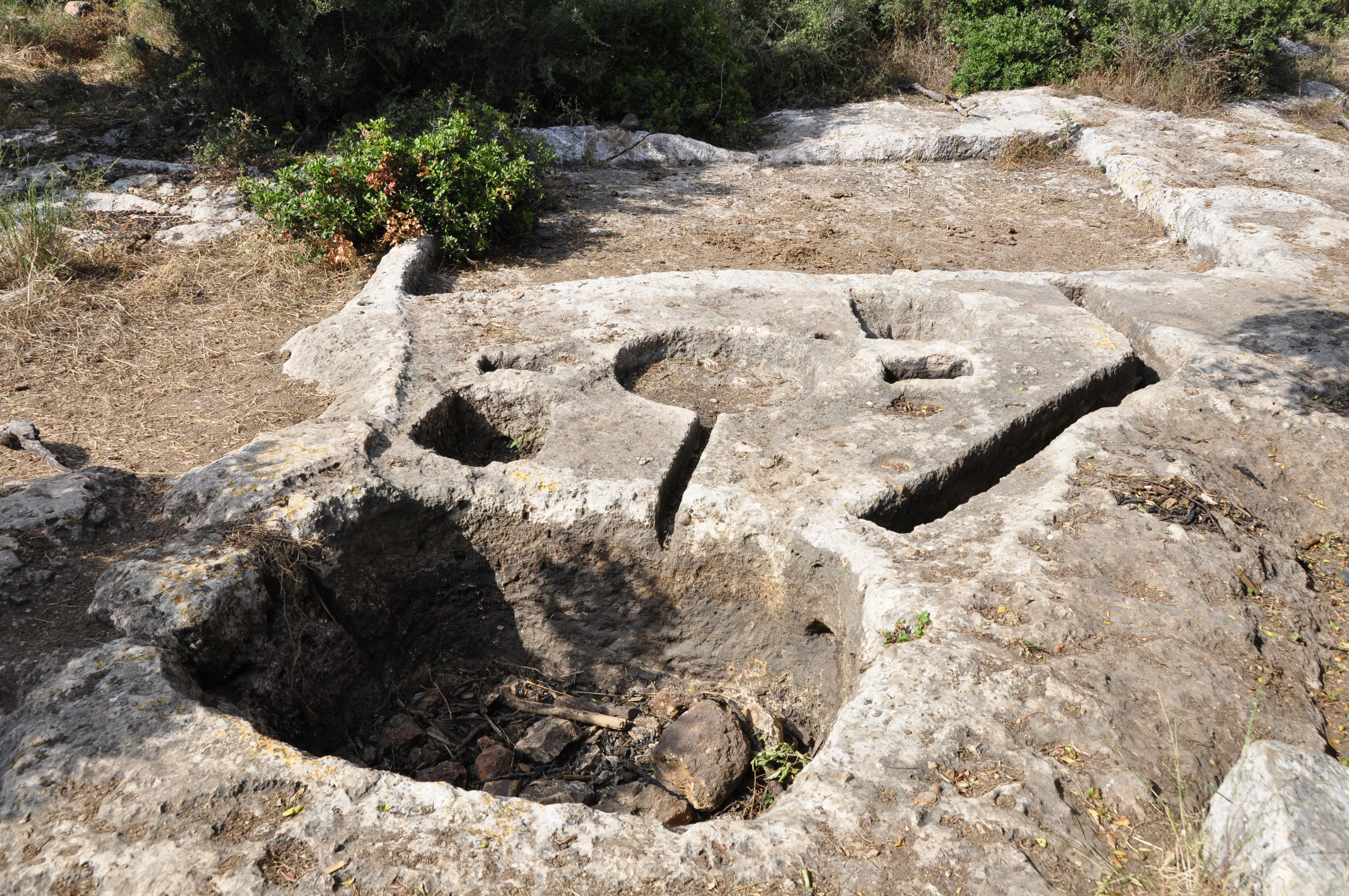
Crusader-era remains in Manot

Pirhei Hagalil Apiary is located in Moshav Manot.

In 2015 a 55,000 year old anatomically modern human skull was found in the Dan David-Manot stalactite cave near the moshav. According to the researchers, the discovery sheds light on one of the most dramatic periods in human evolution. In 2016 a 40,000-year-old grindstone used to prepare food and tools was discovered at an Israel Antiquities Authority dig at the site.

== See also ==
- Manot Cave
- Manot 1
