= Ma'ale Yosef Regional Council =

Coordinates: 33°4′N 35°15′E

Ma'ale Yosef מעלה יוסף
- Regional council (from 1957)
- Interactive map of Ma'ale Yosef
- Country: Israel
- District: Northern
- Subdistrict: Acre
- Natural region: Elon, Yehi'am

Government
  - Head of Municipality: Shimon Goata

Area
  - Total: 92,950 dunams (92.95 km^{2}; 35.89 sq mi)

Population (2024)
  - Total: 12,505
  - Density: 134.5/km^{2} (348.4/sq mi)
- Website: www.myosef.org.il

The Ma'ale Yosef Regional Council (Hebrew: מועצה אזורית מעלה יוסף, Mo'atza Azorit Ma'aleh Yosef) is a regional council in the Upper Galilee, part of the Northern District of Israel, situated between the towns of Ma'alot-Tarshiha and Shlomi. Its offices are located in Gornot HaGalil.

The council was established in 1963, although most of its settlements were founded in the 1950s. It was named for Yosef Weiz, Zionist pioneer of the Second Aliyah and director of the Jewish National Fund following the First World War.

== Geography ==
The council runs along the Israel-Lebanon border. It is bounded on the west by the Mateh Asher Regional Council and Kafr Yasif, on the south by the Misgav Regional Council, and on the east by the Merom HaGalil Regional Council. Within its geographic area are several Druze and other Israeli-Arab villages.

== List of settlements ==
The regional council provides municipal services for the populations within its territory, who live on moshavim and in community settlements.

=== Moshavim ===
- Avdon
- Ein Ya'akov
- Elkosh
- Even Menachem
- Goren
- Hosen
- Lapidot
- Manot
- Me'ona
- Netu'a
- Peki'in HaHadasha
- Shomera
- Shtula
- Tzuriel
- Ya'ara
- Zar'it

=== Community settlements ===
- Abirim
- Gita
- Gornot HaGalil
- Mattat
- Mitzpe Hila
- Neve Ziv

== Demographics ==
In 2022, 96.5% of the population was Jewish and 3.5% was counted as other.

Historical population
Year	Pop.	±%
1972	3,600	—
1983	4,400	+22.2%
1995	5,900	+34.1%
2008	8,300	+40.7%
2022	11,929	+43.7%
2024	12,505	+4.8%

== Voting Patterns ==
In the 2022 election, 68 percent of voters in the regional council voted for the parties of the right-wing coalition led by Benjamin Netanyahu, while 32 percent voted for the parties of the center-left coalition led by Yair Lapid and 0.2 percent voted for the Arab parties.

In the 2026 election, 60 percent of voters in the regional council voted for the parties of the right-wing coalition led by Benjamin Netanyahu, while 33 percent voted for the parties of the center-left coalition led by Gadi Eisenkot and 0.4 percent voted for the Arab parties. An additional 3.8 percent voted for the Reservists, and 2.1 percent voted for Amcha Yisrael. Voter turnout increased 18 percent from the 2022 election.
