= Neve Ziv =

Village in northern Israel

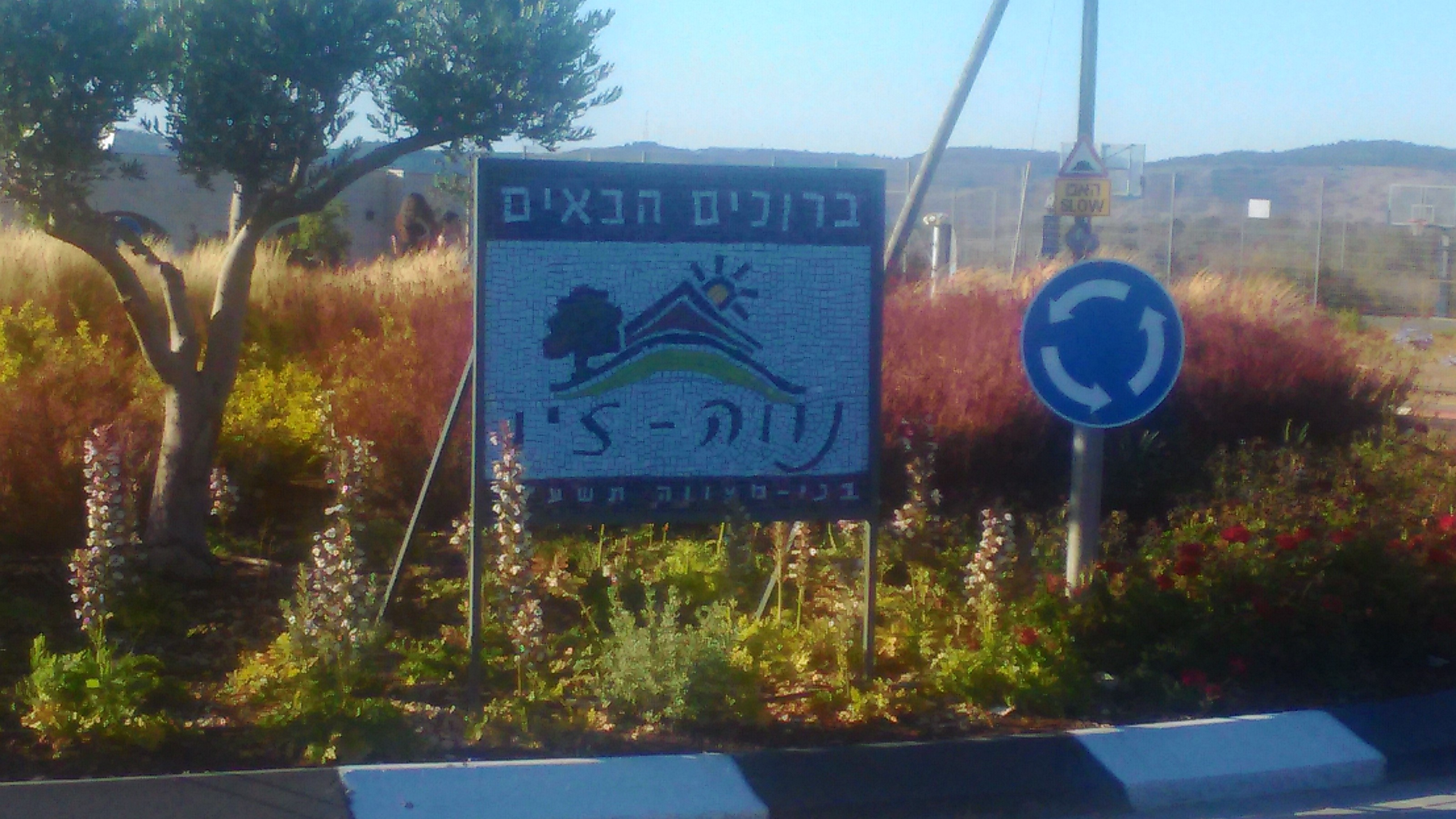

- Location within Northwest Israel Location within Israel
- Coordinates: 33°1′37″N 35°11′5″E
- Country: Israel
- District: Northern
- Subdistrict: Acre
- Council: Ma'ale Yosef
- Founded: 2000
- Population (2024): 964

Neve Ziv (Hebrew: נְוֵה זִיו, lit. 'Brightness Home'), also known as Ziv HaGalil (Hebrew: זִיו הַגָּלִיל, lit. 'Brightness of the Galilee'), is a community settlement in northern Israel. Located east of Nahariya, it falls under the jurisdiction of Ma'ale Yosef Regional Council. In 2024 it had a population of 964.

== History ==
The village was established in 2000 with the assistance of the Jewish Agency.
