= Goren =

Moshav in northern Israel

Goren: גֹּרֶן (Hebrew)
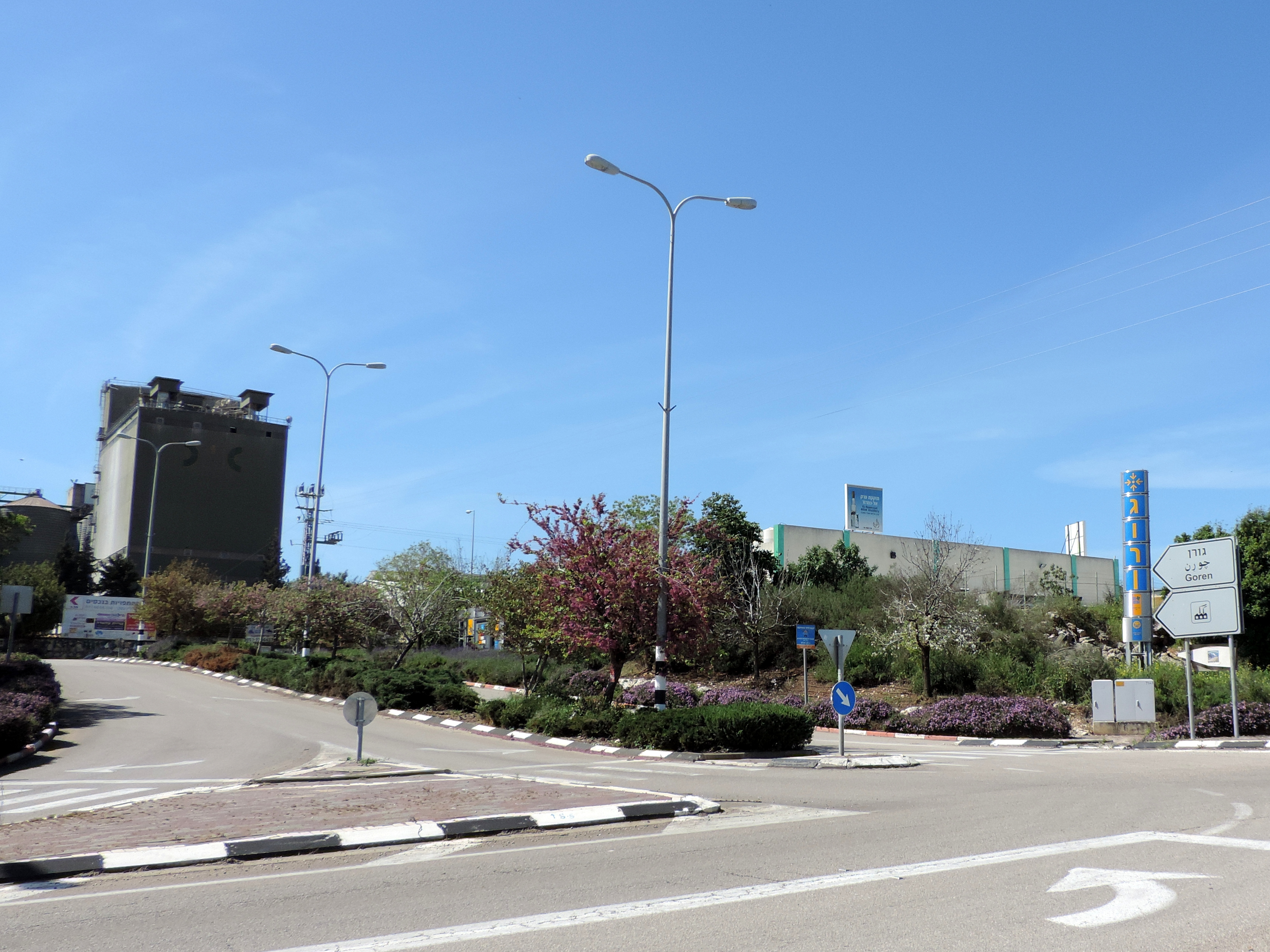
- The entrance to Goren

- Location within Northwest Israel Location within Israel
- Coordinates: 33°3′24″N 35°14′21″E
- Country: Israel
- District: Northern
- Subdistrict: Acre
- Council: Ma'ale Yosef
- Affiliation: Moshavim Movement
- Founded: 1950
- Founder: Yemenite immigrants
- Population (2024): 440

Goren (Hebrew: גֹּרֶן, גורן, lit. 'Granary') is a moshav in northern Israel. Located in the Western Galilee near Ma'alot-Tarshiha, it falls under the jurisdiction of Ma'ale Yosef Regional Council. In 2024 it had a population of 440.

== History ==
The moshav was established in 1950 by immigrants from Yemen, after they had spent a few months living in Rosh HaAyin. The founders were joined by immigrants from North Africa in 1951. Its name is a Hebraized version of the Arabic name for the area.

It is located on land near the former Palestinian village of Iqrit, which had been depopulated as a result of the 1948 Arab-Israeli War.
