= Shia villages in Palestine =

Settlements populated predominantly by Shia Muslims

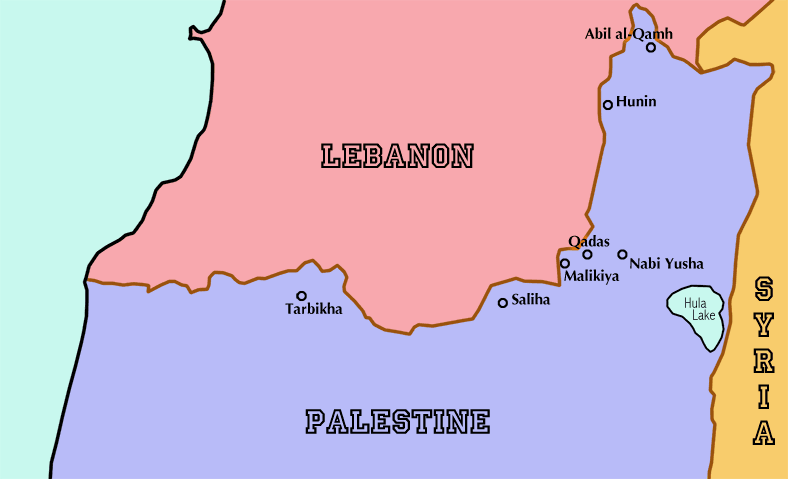
Locations of the seven Shia villages in Mandatory Palestine after they were transferred from Greater Lebanon.

In 1923 and 1924, France and the United Kingdom re-adjusted the boundary between Greater Lebanon and Mandatory Palestine after years of negotiations. As part of this change, seven villages in which the population was predominantly Shia Muslim (i.e., Metouali) were transferred to Palestine: Tarbikha, Saliha, Malkiyeh, Nabi Yusha, Qadas, Hunin, and Abil al-Qamh. Having come under British control, the residents were classified as Palestinians in 1926, one year after the United Kingdom issued Palestinian Citizenship Order 1925. During the 1948 Arab–Israeli War, all of these villages were ethnically cleansed by Israel and the majority of their inhabitants fled to Lebanon, where they were registered as Palestinian refugees.

In 1994, the people who fled from these seven Shia villages were granted Lebanese citizenship and ceased to be recognized as Palestinians or refugees. Some Lebanese political parties and militias, such as Hezbollah, have asserted that the sites of these villages in northern Israel belong to Lebanon.

These villages are notable for having been the only Shia settlements in what was otherwise a territory dominated by Sunni Muslims. To date, despite Shia Islam constituting the second-largest Islamic sect, there are no reliable sources attesting a Shia presence in Israel or the State of Palestine.

== History ==
=== Mandates after World War I ===
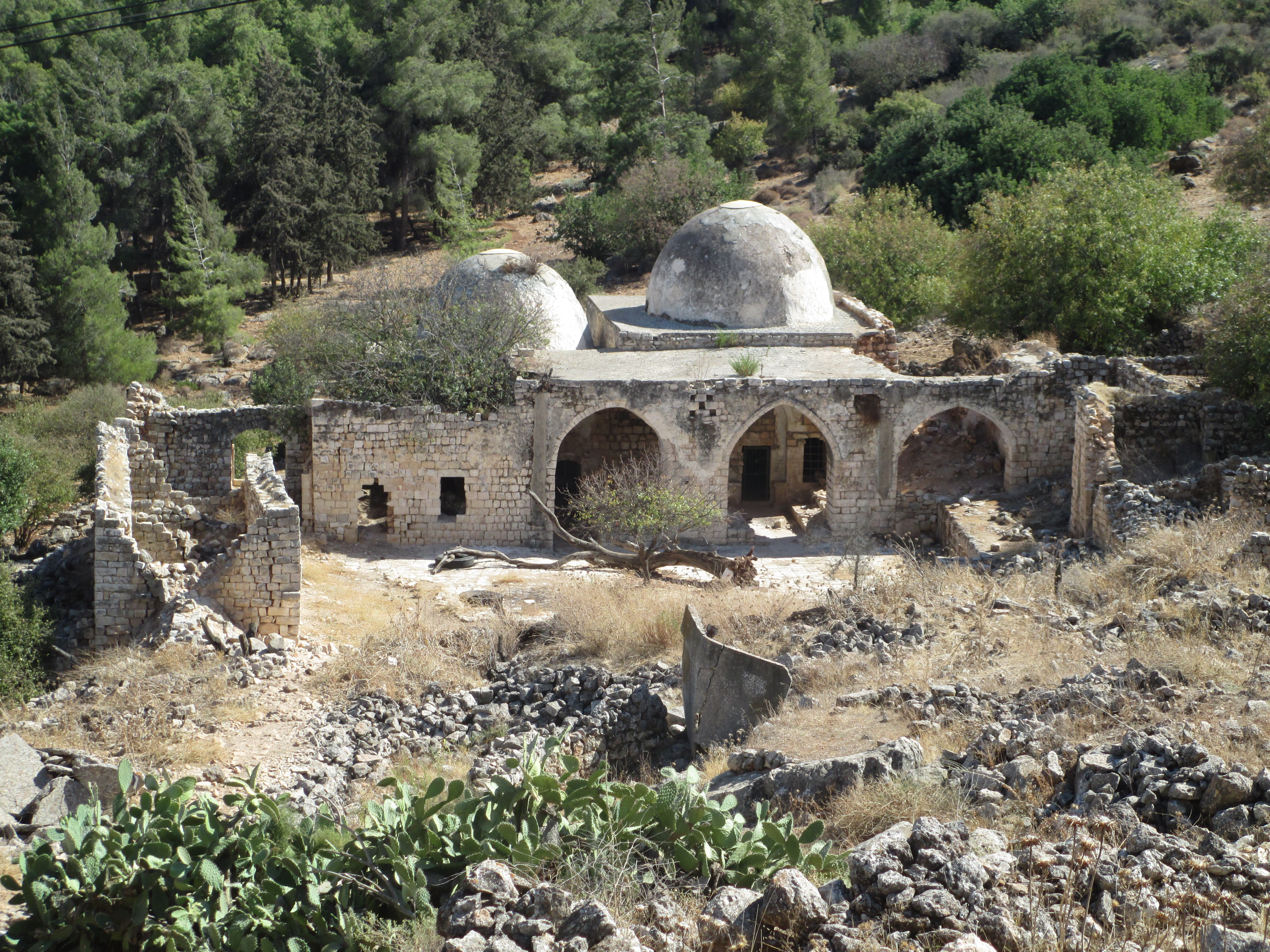
Ruined Maqam an-Nabi Yusha' shrine

Historically, South Lebanon was deeply connected to Palestine’s coastal cities through trade, governance, and kinship, forming a tightly interwoven regional network. At the end of World War I, the British and French governments held most of the Levant under military occupation, with Britain controlling Palestine apart from the northernmost parts, and France controlling Syria and Lebanon. These were administered under the military Occupied Enemy Territorial Administrations (OETA). After the 1919 Treaty of Versailles prescribed the division of the region into mandates, it was decided at the San Remo conference of May 1920 that Britain would have the Mandate for Palestine while France would have the Mandate for Syria and Lebanon. The Shia villages in Palestine have long had strong social and commercial ties with southern Lebanon, especially with the predominantly Twelver Shia Muslim region of Jabal ʿAmil. However, the establishment of modern national borders disrupted these longstanding connections and complicated the social and legal identities that had existed prior to the Mandate period, while transforming the Southern Lebanon area into an economically isolated and impoverished periphery by cutting it off from its historical hinterland.

==== Lebanon and Palestine ====
In September 1920, the first French high commissioner General Henri Gouraud, announced the birth of the state of Greater Lebanon. On 23 December, the British and French signed an agreement that broadly defined the boundary between their respective spheres. The agreement also established the Paulet–Newcombe commission to determine the precise boundary, with wide powers to recommend adjustments. In 1921, before the commission had reported, France conducted a census which covered the seven villages and granted Lebanese citizenship to their residents. None of the villages were listed in the 1922 census of Palestine, but the remaining Shia population (classified as "Metawilehs") were still listed, totaling 156 persons: 3 in Gaza, 150 in Al Bassa, and 3 in Majd al-Kerum. However, the commission decided on border adjustments which placed the villages on the Palestinian side of the border, along with more than a dozen other villages. The new boundary was agreed in a treaty of September 1923. The citizenship of the residents was not changed to Palestinian until 1926.

The 1931 census counted 4,100 Metawalis in Palestine. Abil al-Qamh was about half Shia and half Greek Christian, while the other six were mostly Shia.

=== 1948 Arab–Israeli War ===
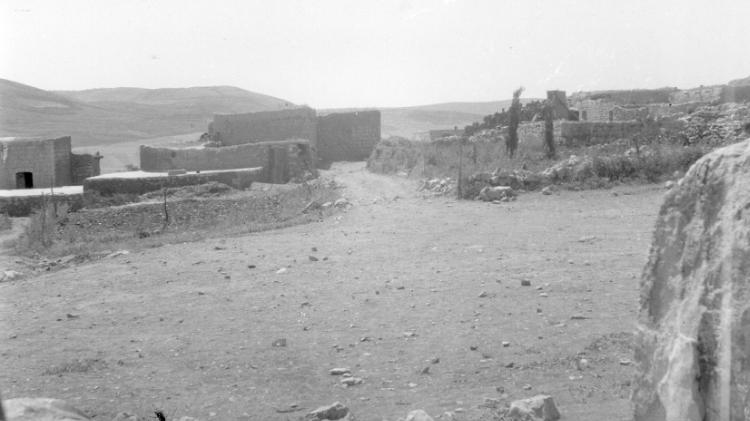
Al-Malikiyya in 1948

During the 1948 Arab–Israeli War, all of the villages were ethnically cleansed. Their residents mostly fled as refugees to Lebanon, though some remained in Israel as internally displaced persons. Israeli communities partly or completely on the lands of the former villages include Yuval, Shomera, Zar'it, Shtula, Margaliot, Ramot Naftali, Yir'on, Yiftah, and Malkia.

In 1994, the refugees from the seven villages, who had been classified as Palestinian refugees since 1948, were granted Lebanese citizenship. Some factions in the Lebanese government, Hezbollah in particular, have called for the seven villages to be "returned to Lebanon".

== See also ==
- Lebanese nationality law
- Paulet–Newcombe Agreement
- Shebaa farms
- Upper Galilee
- Good Fence
