= Metzudat Koach =

Coordinates: 33°06′53″N 35°33′22″E

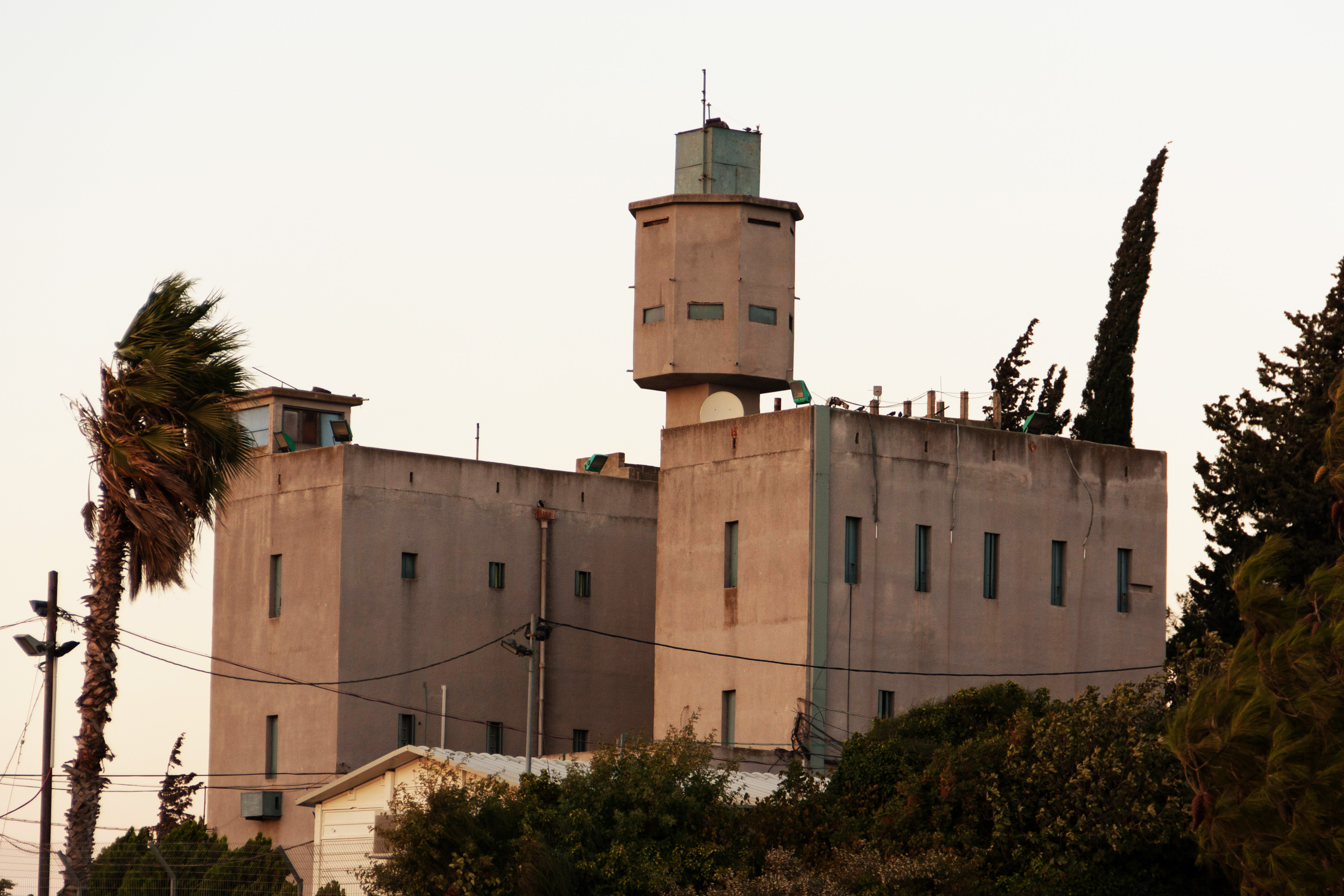
Metzudat Koach, 2012

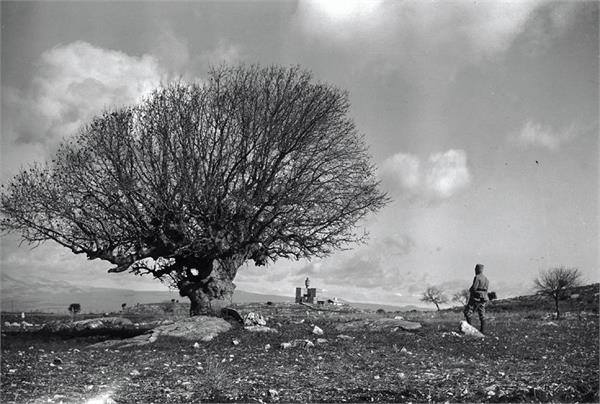
Nabi Yusha police fortress from Qadas 1939

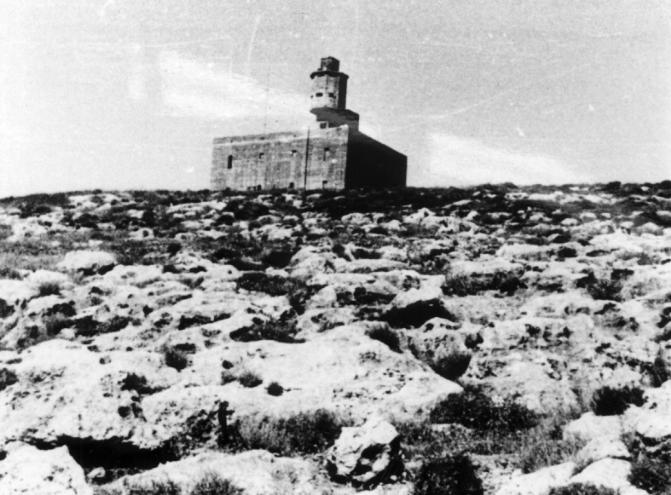
Nabi Yusha police fortress, 1948

Metzudat Koach (Hebrew: מצודת כ"ח) (also Nabi Yusha fort) is a British Mandate police fort built during the 1936–39 Arab revolt in Palestine. On the grounds of the fort are a memorial monument and a museum founded in 2014. The Metzudat Koach Memorial commemorates 28 Israeli soldiers who fell in battle during the conquest of the fort in 1948.

Metzudat Koah is located in the Upper Galilee near the ruins of Al-Nabi Yusha' a Palestinian village depopulated by Israeli forces in 1948. The Shia shrine Maqam an-Nabi Yusha' ("Prophet Joshua") remains largely intact. Metzudat Koach is listed as part of the Israel National Trail.

== History ==
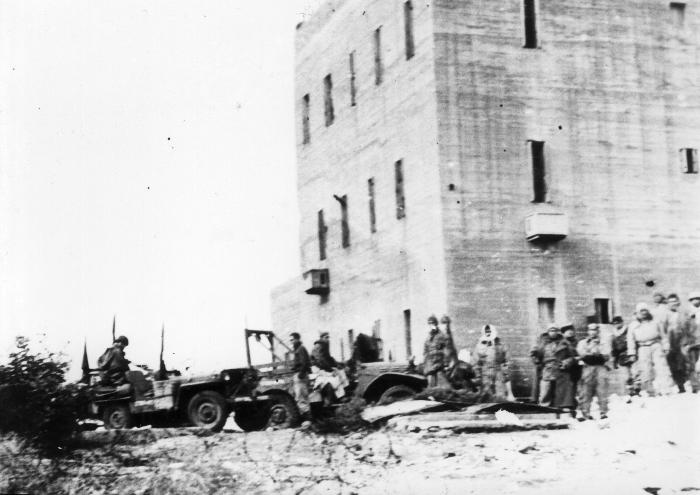
Yiftach Brigade at Nabi Yusha. 16 May 1948

Metzudat Koah is a Tegart fort commissioned by the British and constructed by Solel Boneh. It was a key observation point on Ramot Naftali, overlooking the Hula Valley.

By mid-April 1948, the British army had evacuated most of Upper Galilee. A number of key points were subsequently occupied by Arab forces, including the police fort at Nabi Yusha. This fort commanded the main road to Upper Galilee and the routes to the Jewish settlements of Ramot Naftali and Manara.

In the evening hours of April 15, the police station was attacked by a company composed of Golani, Palmach and irregulars from nearby Jewish settlements, which moved in two armored cars and two armored Egged buses. The attacking force was forced to withdraw due to intense fire. Four Jews were killed.

On April 20, a second attempt was made to occupy the fort by a force from the third Palmach battalion. A small force succeeded in breaking the barriers and reaching the wall, but two of its members were hit, which delayed the detonation of the explosives until their evacuation. During their evacuation, enemy fire was directed at them and many of the unit's soldiers were killed. The troops fought to the last man. Altogether, 22 Jews were killed in the battle.

During the night of May 16/17, a company of the third battalion of the Yiftach Brigade occupied the fort after driving away the enemy. On the next day, two of the soldiers were killed. In total, 28 Jewish soldiers fell in the battles for the occupation of the fort, and "Metzudat Koach" ("Fort of the 28") is named after them.

== See also ==
- HaReut Museum
