= 1922 census of Palestine =

First census by the British Mandate of Palestine

J. B. Barron, ed. Palestine: Report and General Abstracts of the Census of 1922. Government of Palestine. (58 pages)

The 1922 census of Palestine was the first census carried out by the authorities of the British Mandate of Palestine, on 23 October 1922.

The reported population was 757,182, including the military and persons of foreign nationality. The division into religious groups was 590,890 Muslims, 83,794 Jews, 73,024 Christians, 7,028 Druze, 408 Sikhs, 265 Baháʼís, 156 Metawalis, and 163 Samaritans.

== Operation ==
Censuses carried out by the Ottoman Empire, most recently in 1914, had been for the purpose of imposing taxation or locating men for military service. For this reason, the announcement of a census was unpopular and effort was made in advance to reassure the population. This was believed to be successful except in the case of the Bedouins of the Beersheva Subdistrict, who refused to cooperate. Many census gatherers, supervised by 296 Revising Operators and Enumerators, visited each dwelling, with special arrangements made for persons having no fixed address. Where possible, houses were visited by a census taker of the same religion as the occupants.

The uncooperative Bedouin of the Southern District were counted approximately using counts of households and tithe records, leading to an estimate of 72,898 persons for that sector.

A number of villages in the northern border area were not enumerated as they were still under French control, despite being in Palestine according to the Franco-British boundary agreement (1920). The census did not cover Transjordan at all.

== Publication ==
A summary of the census results was published in one volume:

J. B. Barron, ed. (1923). Palestine: Report and General Abstracts of the Census of 1922. Government of Palestine. (58 pages)

It contains the population of each village divided by religion and sex, and summaries for each district and the whole country. There are also tables with population counts according to Christian denomination, age, marital status, and language.

== See also ==
- 1931 census of Palestine
- Hope Simpson Enquiry
