= Paulet–Newcombe Agreement =

1923 agreement on the boundary between Palestine and Syria

1920 agreement, signed by the British Ambassador to France, Charles Hardinge and the French Foreign Minister, Georges Leygues

1923 agreement, signed by French Lieutenant Colonel N. Paulet and British Lieutenant Colonel S. F. Newcombe

The Franco-British Boundary Agreements

The Paulet–Newcombe Agreement or Paulet-Newcombe Line, was a 1923 agreement between the British and French governments regarding the position and nature of the boundary between the British Mandates of Palestine and Iraq, on one side and the French Mandate of Syria and Lebanon. The 1923 line defined the border of Mandatory Palestine from the Mediterranean up to Al-Hamma, Tiberias. The 1920 line defined, in less detail, the border of the French Mandate for Syria and Lebanon from the Mediterranean up to Jeziret-ibn-Omar.

The Agreement takes its name from the two Lieutenant colonels who were in charge of precisely mapping the border lines and drafting the Agreement, i.e. French Lieutenant colonel N. Paulet and British Lieutenant colonel S. F. Newcombe.

Together with a preliminary 1920 agreement, these are known as the Franco-British Boundary Agreements. The Iraq-Syria border was subsequently finalized in 1932 following a League of Nations commission review.

Today's Iraq–Syria border, Jordan–Syria border and Israel-Lebanon border, apart from the areas disputed as a result of later conflicts between Israel, Lebanon and Syria, are defined by these agreements.

== Sykes Picot and the Franco-Syrian War ==
The line separating the British and French spheres of interest in the area was first defined in the 1916 Sykes-Picot agreement. Britain's military occupied the region during the First World War, and in 1920, French Army invaded the Arab Kingdom of Syria. After resisting the occupation for several months, Arabs capitulated in July 1920. On 8 August 1920, during the Transjordan interregnum period, the French confirmed to the British that they would respect the Sykes-Picot line, and not move any military forces south.

== December 1920 agreement ==
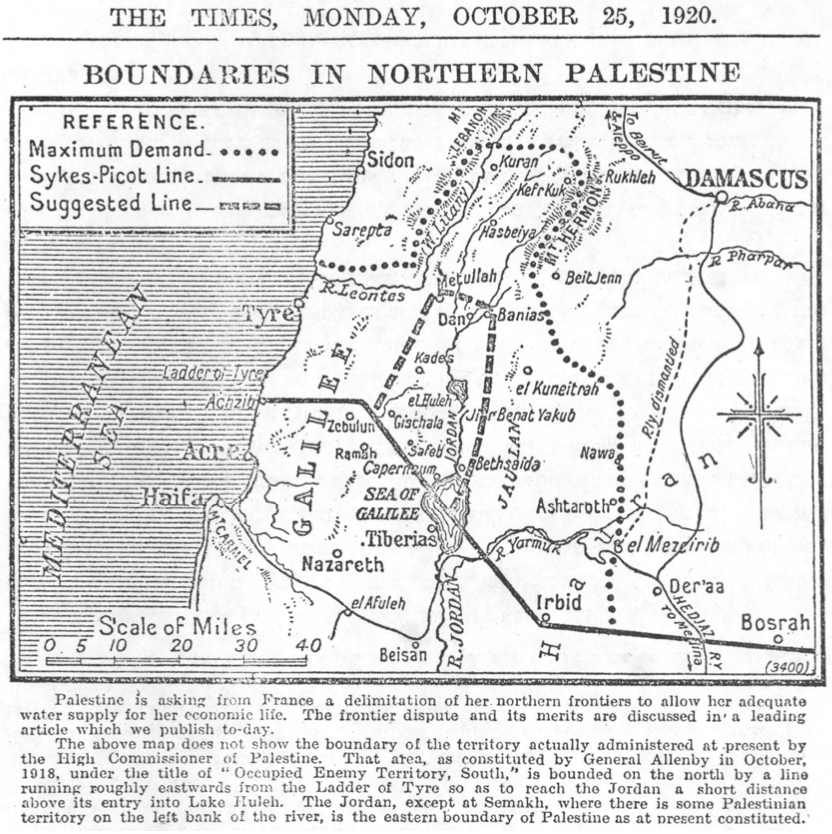
Article from The Times, 25 October 1920, reporting on the active discussions regarding the boundary line

The boundary between the forthcoming British and French mandates was first defined in broad terms in the 1920 "Franco-British Convention on Certain Points Connected with the Mandates for Syria and the Lebanon, Palestine and Mesopotamia", signed in Paris by the British Ambassador to France, Charles Hardinge and the French Foreign Minister, Georges Leygues, on 23 December 1920. That agreement placed the bulk of the Golan Heights in the French sphere.

The treaty also established a joint commission to settle the precise details of the border and mark it on the ground.

The 1932 commission concluded that the 1920 agreement had been reached on the basis of the “British International 1:1,000,000 map published in 1916 and revised in 1918”, formally known as the Asia 1: 1,000,000. Projection of the International Map compiled at the Royal Geographical Society under the direction of the Geographical Section, General Staff. Drawn and printed at the War Office, 1916, today known as "GSGS 2555".

The boundaries between the territories under the French mandate for Syria and the Lebanon on the one hand and the British mandates of Mesopotamia and Palestine on the other are determined as follows:

On the east, the Tigris from Jeziret-ibn-Omar to the boundaries of the former vilayets of Diarbekir and Mosul.

On the south-east and south, the aforesaid boundary of the former vilayets southwards as far as Roumelan Koeui; thence a line leaving in the territory under the French mandate the entire basin of the western Kabur and passing in a straight line towards the Euphrates, which it crosses at Abu Kemal, thence a straight line to Imtar to the south of Jebul Druse, then a line to the south of Nasib on the Hedjaz Railway, then a line to Semakh on the Lake of Tiberias, traced to the south of the railway, which descends towards the lake and parallel to the railway. Deraa and its environs will remain in the territory under the French mandate; the frontier will in principle leave the valley of the Yarmuk in the territory under the French mandate, but will be drawn as close as possible to the railway in such a manner as to allow the construction in the valley of the Yarmuk of a railway entirely situated in the territory under the British mandate. At Semakh the frontier will be fixed in such a manner as to allow each of the two High Contracting Parties to construct and establish a harbour and railway station giving free access to the Lake of Tiberias.

On the west, the frontier will pass from Semakh across the Lake of Tiberias to the mouth of the Wadi Massadyie. It will then follow the course of this river upstream, and then the Wadi Jeraba to its source. From that point it will reach the track from El Kuneitra to Banias at the point marked Skek, thence it will follow the said track, which will remain in the territory under the French mandate as far as Banias. Thence the frontier will be drawn westwards as far as Metullah, which will remain in Palestinian territory. This portion of the frontier will be traced in detail in such a manner as to ensure for the territory under the French mandate easy communication entirely within such territory with the regions of Tyre and Sidon, as well as continuity of road communication to the west and to the east of Banias.

From Metullah the frontier will reach the watershed of the valley of the Jordan and the basin of the Litani. Thence it will follow this watershed southwards. Thereafter it will follow in principle the watershed between the Wadis Farah-Houroun and Kerkera, which will remain in the territory under the British mandate, and the Wadis El Doubleh, El Aioun and Es Zerka, which will remain in the territory under the French mandate. The frontier will reach the Mediterranean Sea at the port of Ras-el-Nakura, which will remain in the territory under the French mandate. — Franco-British Convention on Certain Points Connected with the Mandates for Syria and the Lebanon, Palestine and Mesopotamia, 23 December 1920, Article I

== March 1923 agreement ==
Borders in the region of the Sea of Galilee and Golan Heights, showing the Ottoman boundaries, the 1920 agreement and the 1923 agreement

The commission submitted its final report on 3 February 1922, which included a number of amendments. The amendments included:

- North East boundary moved westward (reducing the area of Palestine) to avoid splitting the lands of Emir Mahmud El-Fa’ur of Quneitra
- Northern boundary moved northward (increasing the area of Palestine) to include the entire Sea of Galilee and the Yarmuk valley

It was approved with some caveats by the French and British governments on 7 March 1923, several months before Britain and France assumed their Mandatory responsibilities on 29 September 1923.

The agreements fixed the line of the Syrian-Palestinian border (now the Syrian-Israeli border) between the Mediterranean Sea and the town of Al-Hamma. The 1923 agreement takes its name from French Lieutenant Colonel N. Paulet and British Lieutenant Colonel S. F. Newcombe, who was appointed to lead the Boundary Commission.

As a result of the agreement, 20 villages which had previously been under French administration were incorporated into Palestine: Suruh, Nebi Rubin (near Tarbikha), Iqrit, Khirbat Iribbin, Ma'asub, Ma'aser, Samah (near Ya'ara), Idmit, Arab al-Samniyya, Jurdieh, Hanita, 'Ain Hoor (near Hanita), Tarbikha, Al-Malkiyya, Al-Nabi Yusha', Khirbet el Bediyeh (near Hanita), Saliha, Qadas, Al-Manara, Hunin.

== 1932 Iraq-Syria border commission ==
The League of Nations appointed a commission to review the Iraq-Syria border, ahead of the October 1932 accession of Iraq to the League of Nations. The commission carried out a detailed review of the 1920 agreement.

== Gallery ==
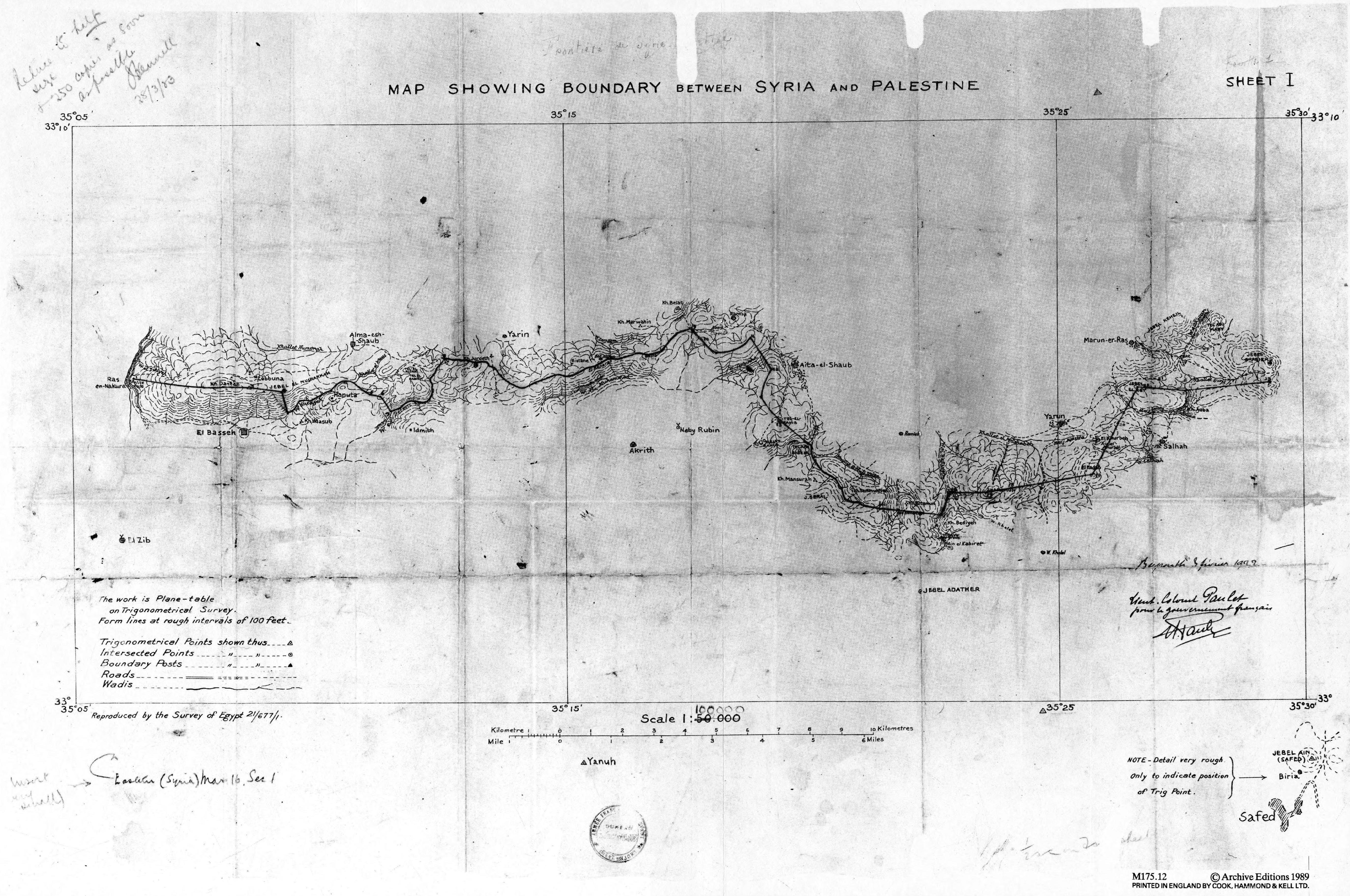

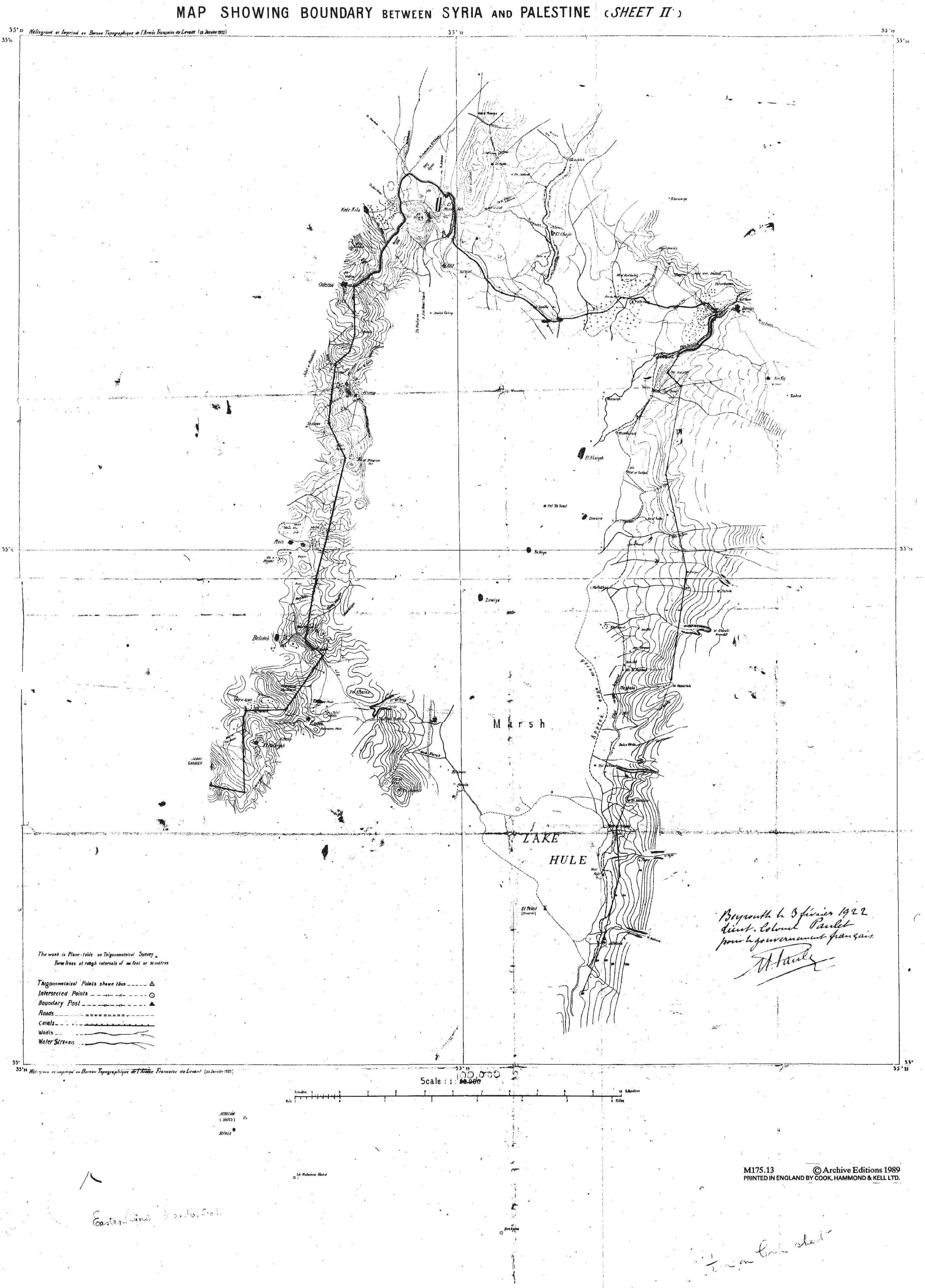

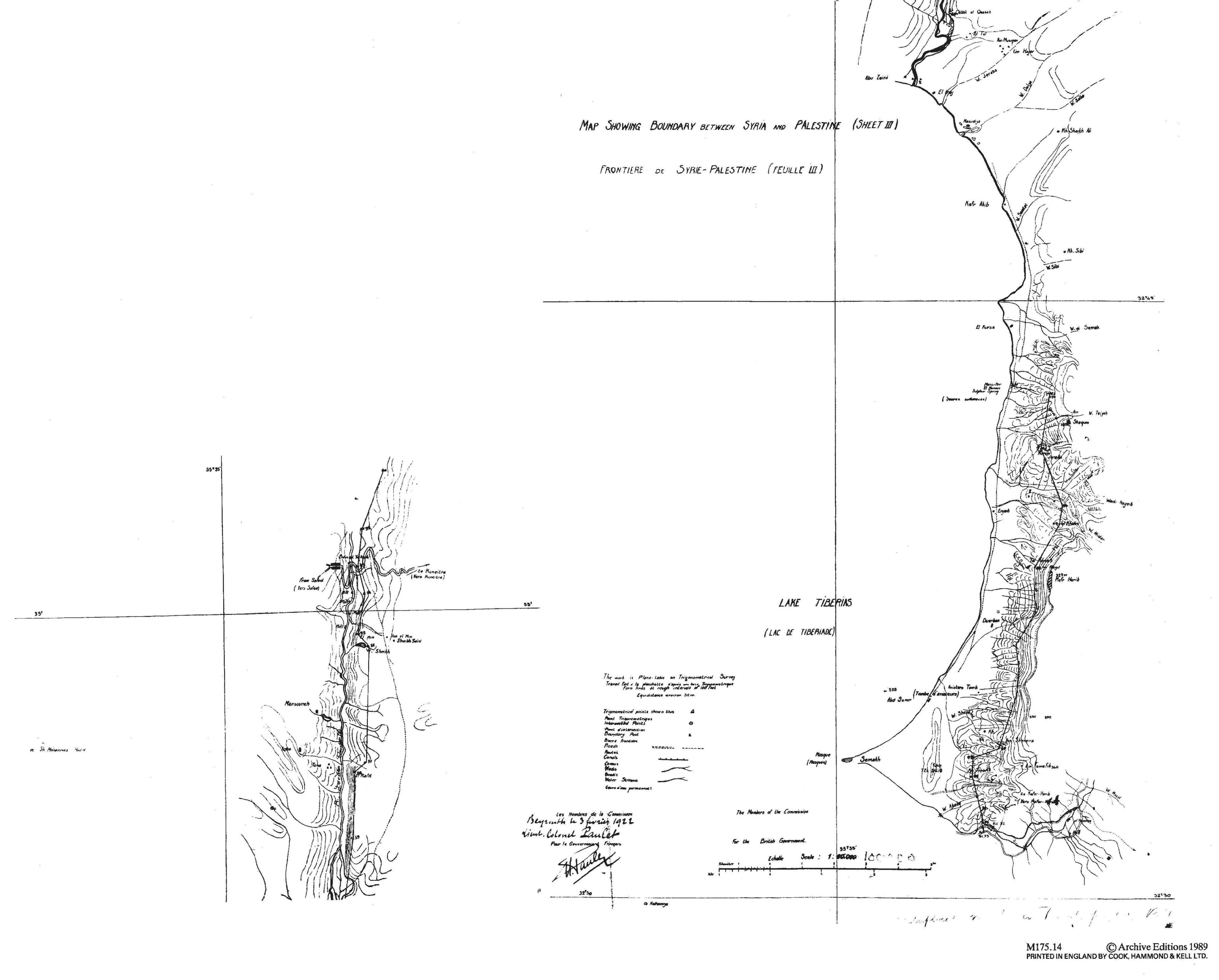

== See also ==
- Seven Lebanese Villages
- Shebaa farms

== Bibliography ==
- Biger, Gideon (2004). The Boundaries of Modern Palestine, 1840–1947. Routledge. ISBN 978-1-135-76652-8.
- John J. McTague Jr. (1982), Anglo-French Negotiations over the Boundaries of Palestine, 1919–1920, Journal of Palestine Studies, Vol. 11, No. 2. (Winter), pp. 100–12.
- Franco-British Convention on Certain Points Connected with the Mandates for Syria and the Lebanon, Palestine and Mesopotamia, signed Dec. 23, 1920. Text available in American Journal of International Law, Vol. 16, No. 3, Supplement, 1922, pp. 122–6.
- Agreement between His Majesty's Government and the French Government respecting the Boundary Line between Syria and Palestine from the Mediterranean to El Hámmé, Treaty Series No. 13 (1923), Cmd. 1910.
- Gideon Biger (1989), Geographical and other arguments in delimitation in the boundaries of British Palestine, in "International Boundaries and Boundary Conflict Resolution", IBRU Conference, ISBN 1-85560-000-5, pp. 41–61.
- Yitzhak Gil-Har (1993), British commitments to the Arabs and their application to the Palestine-Trans-Jordan boundary: The issue of the Semakh triangle, Middle Eastern Studies, Vol. 29, No. 4, pp. 690–701.
- Muhsin Yusuf (1991), The Zionists and the process of defining the borders of Palestine, 1915–1923, Journal of South Asian and Middle Eastern Studies, Vol. 15, No. 1, pp. 18–39.
- Gideon Biger (1995), The encyclopedia of international boundaries, New York: Facts on File.
- Gideon Biger (2005), The Boundaries of Modern Palestine, 1840-1947. London: Routledge. ISBN 0-7146-5654-2.
- US Department of State, International Boundary Study series: Iraq-Jordan, Iraq-Syria, Jordan-Syria, Israel-Lebanon.
