= Al-Nabi Yusha' =

Village in Safad, Mandatory Palestine

Al-Nabi Yusha' النبي يوشع
- Village
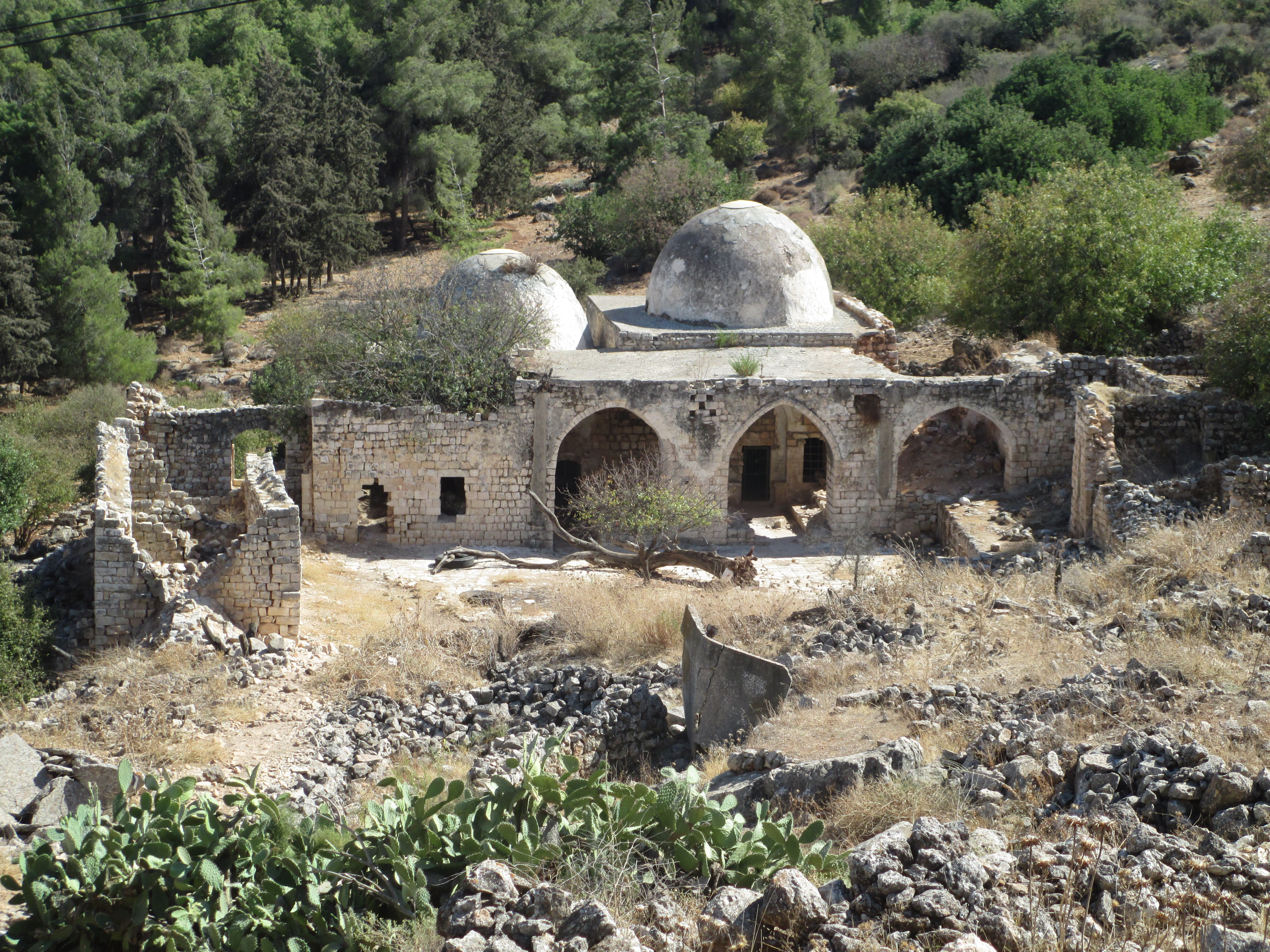
- Aerial shot of the historic Maqam an-Nabi Yusha' shrine in 2013
- Etymology: "the prophet Joshua"
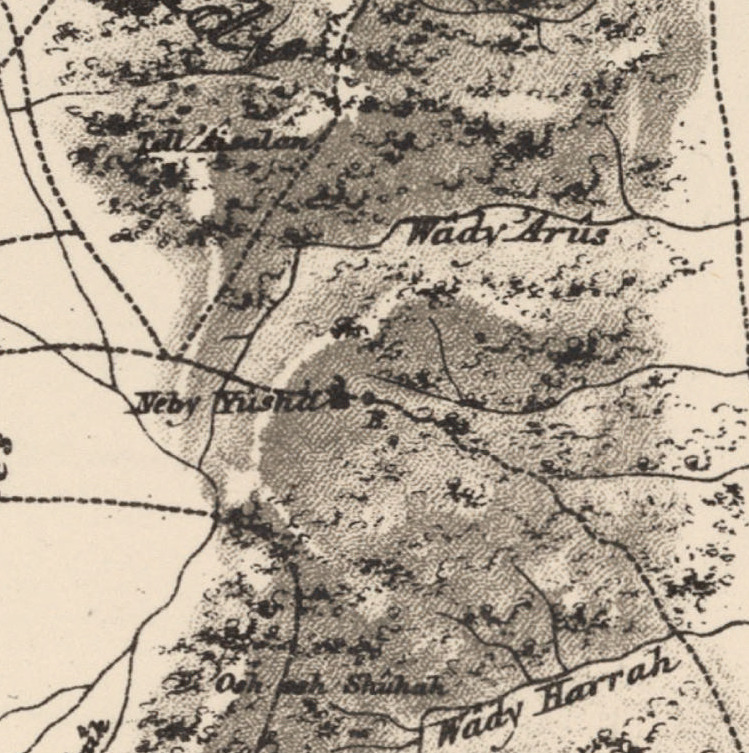
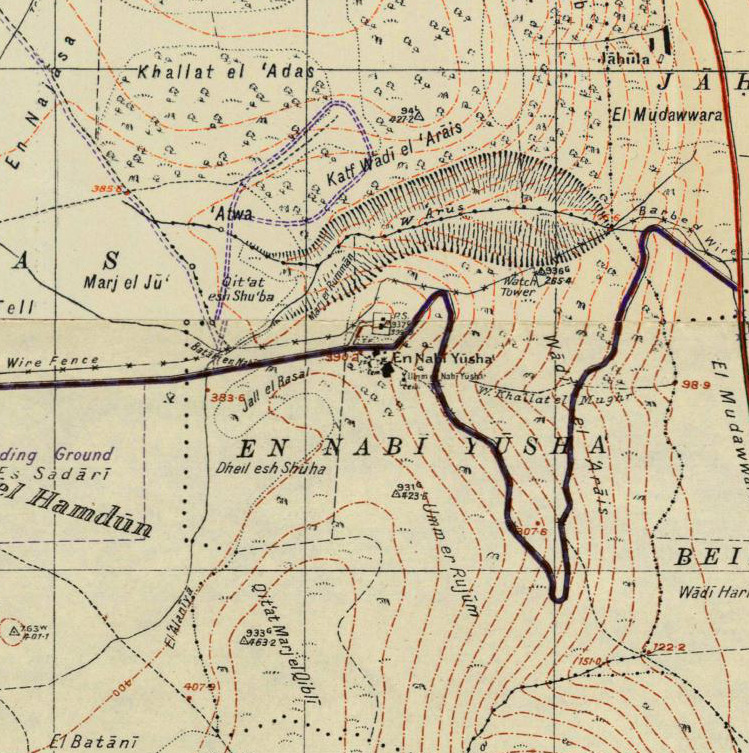
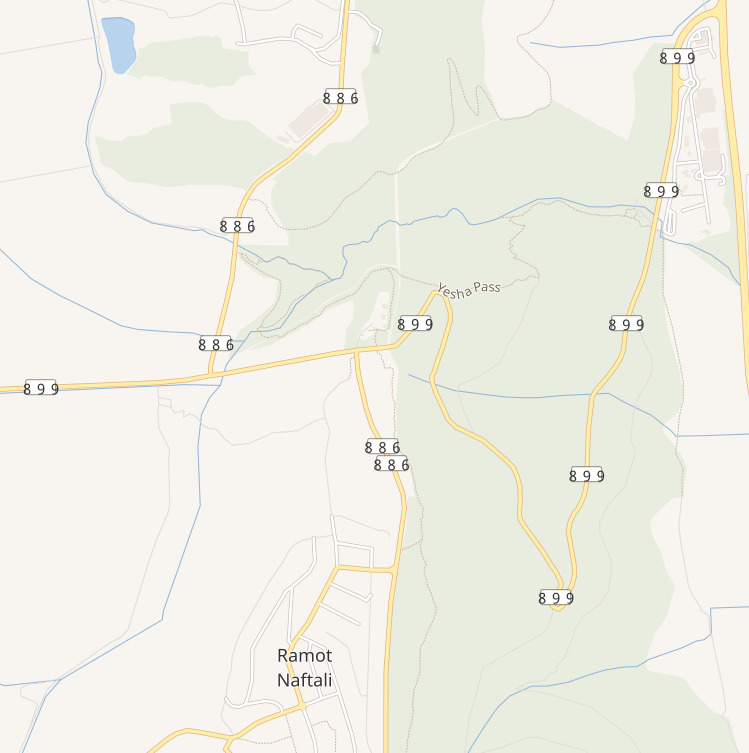
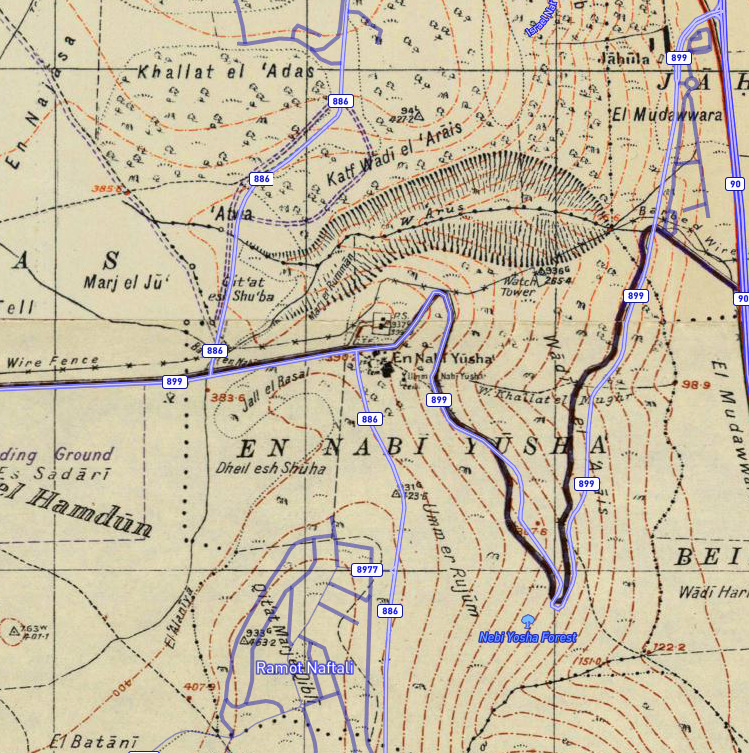
- 1870s map 1940s map modern map 1940s with modern overlay map A series of historical maps of the area around Al-Nabi Yusha' (click the buttons)

- Location within Mandatory Palestine
- Coordinates: 33°06′46″N 35°33′22″E
- Palestine grid: 202/279
- Geopolitical entity: Mandatory Palestine
- Subdistrict: Safad
- Date of depopulation: May 16, 1948

Area
  - Total: 3,617 dunams (3.617 km^{2}; 1.397 sq mi)

Population (1945)
  - Total: 70
- Cause(s) of depopulation: Military assault by Yishuv forces
- Current Localities: Ramot Naftali

Al-Nabi Yusha' (Arabic: النبي يوشع) was a small Palestinian village in the Galilee situated 17 kilometers to the northeast of Safad, with an elevation of 375 meters above sea level. It became part of the Palestine Mandate under British control from 1923 until 1948, when it was depopulated during the 1948 Arab-Israeli War. The village was surrounded by forest land overlooking the Hula Valley.

== History ==
During the late eighteenth century, a family known as al-Ghul built the religious complex and shrine known as the Maqam an-Nabi Yusha' (biblical Joshua), which included a mosque and a building for visitors, as an act of devotion. This family, also called the "servants of the shrine," numbered about fifty and were the first to settle the site. They cultivated the surrounding land, and the place subsequently evolved into a village.

In 1851/1852 van de Velde noted the wali at Al-Nabi Yusha, with an old terebinth tree.

In 1875 Victor Guérin arrived at the Maqam (shrine) after walking up on a very steep and difficult path from the east. He described the shrine, dedicated by the local Muslims to Nabi Yusha', as a building surmounted with two small cupolas.

In 1881, the PEF's Survey of Western Palestine (SWP) noted that the "Metawali" from nearby Qadas came to Al-Nabi Yusha' to venerate the name of Joshua.

Pottery from Rachaya Al Foukhar have been found in the village.

=== British Mandate era ===
At the end of World War I it was under French control, and the 1920 boundary agreement between Britain and French placed it in Lebanon. At the time of the census conducted by the French in 1921, the villagers were granted Lebanese citizenship. However the Boundary Commission established by the 1920 agreement shifted the border, leaving the village in Palestine. Transfer of control to the British authorities was not complete until 1924.

During the Mandate period, the British built a police station in the village. The people of al-Nabi Yusha', all of whom were Shia Muslims, held an annual mawsim (pilgrimage) and festival on the fifteenth of the month Sha'aban (the eighth month of the Islamic calendar). The mawsim was similar to that of the Nabi Rubin festival in southern coast of Palestine.

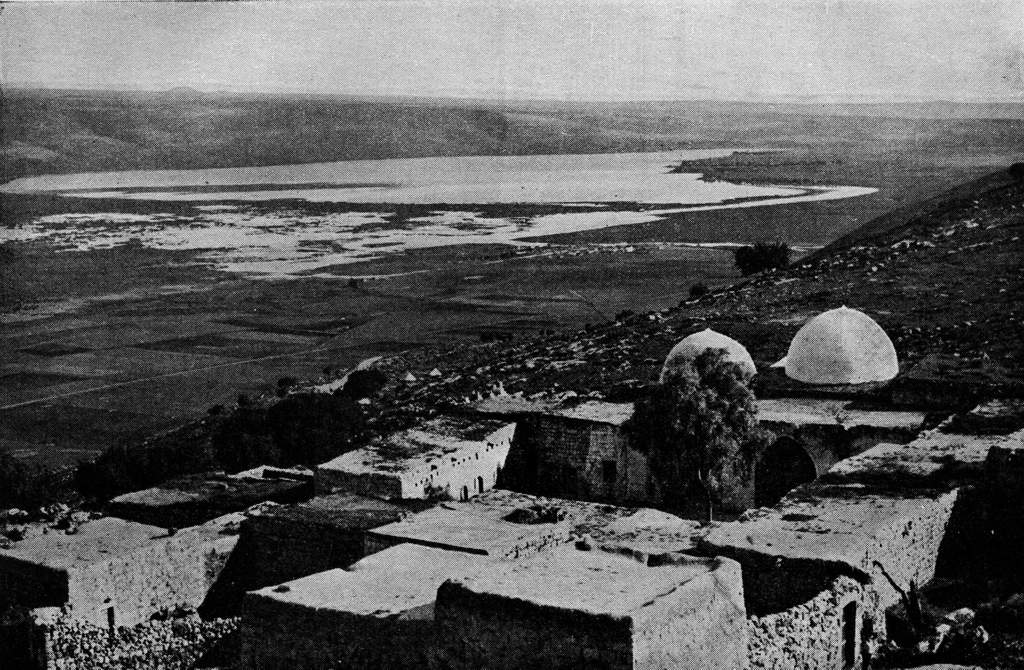
View of Hula Valley from al-Nabi Yusha' 1930s

In the 1931 census of Palestine, the village was home to 52 residents that year (12 households), growing to 70 in the 1945 statistics, and 81 (18 households) by 1948 when it was depopulated. The village occupied an area of 3,617 dunams, all private except for a dunam of public property. In 1944–45 the village had 640 dunams of land used for cereals, while 16 dunams was built-up (urban) area.

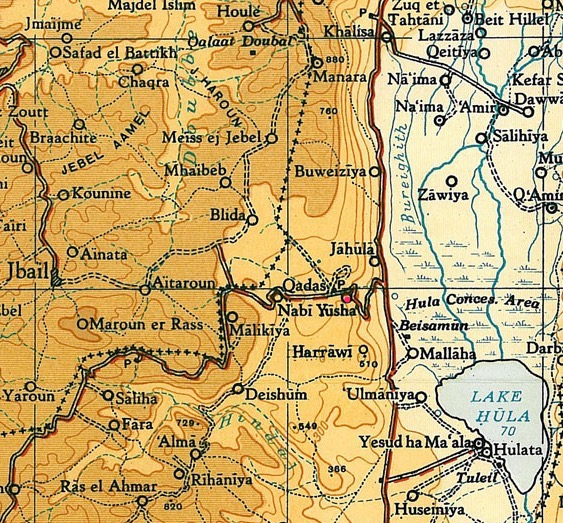
Al-Nabi Yusha'.1945. Survey of Palestine. Scale 1:250,000

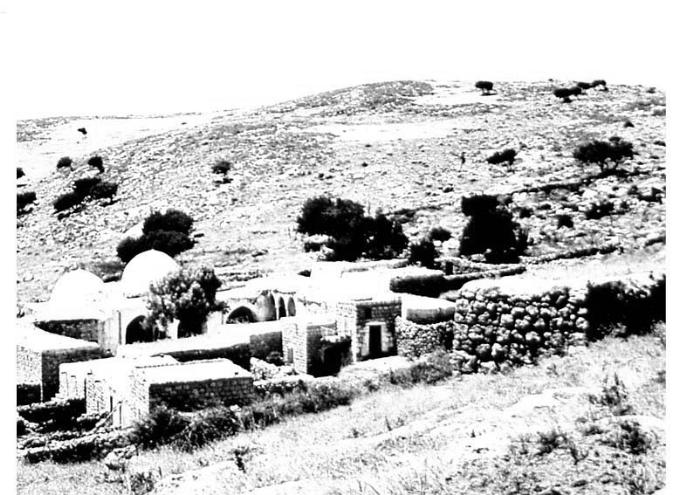
Nabi Yusha 1948

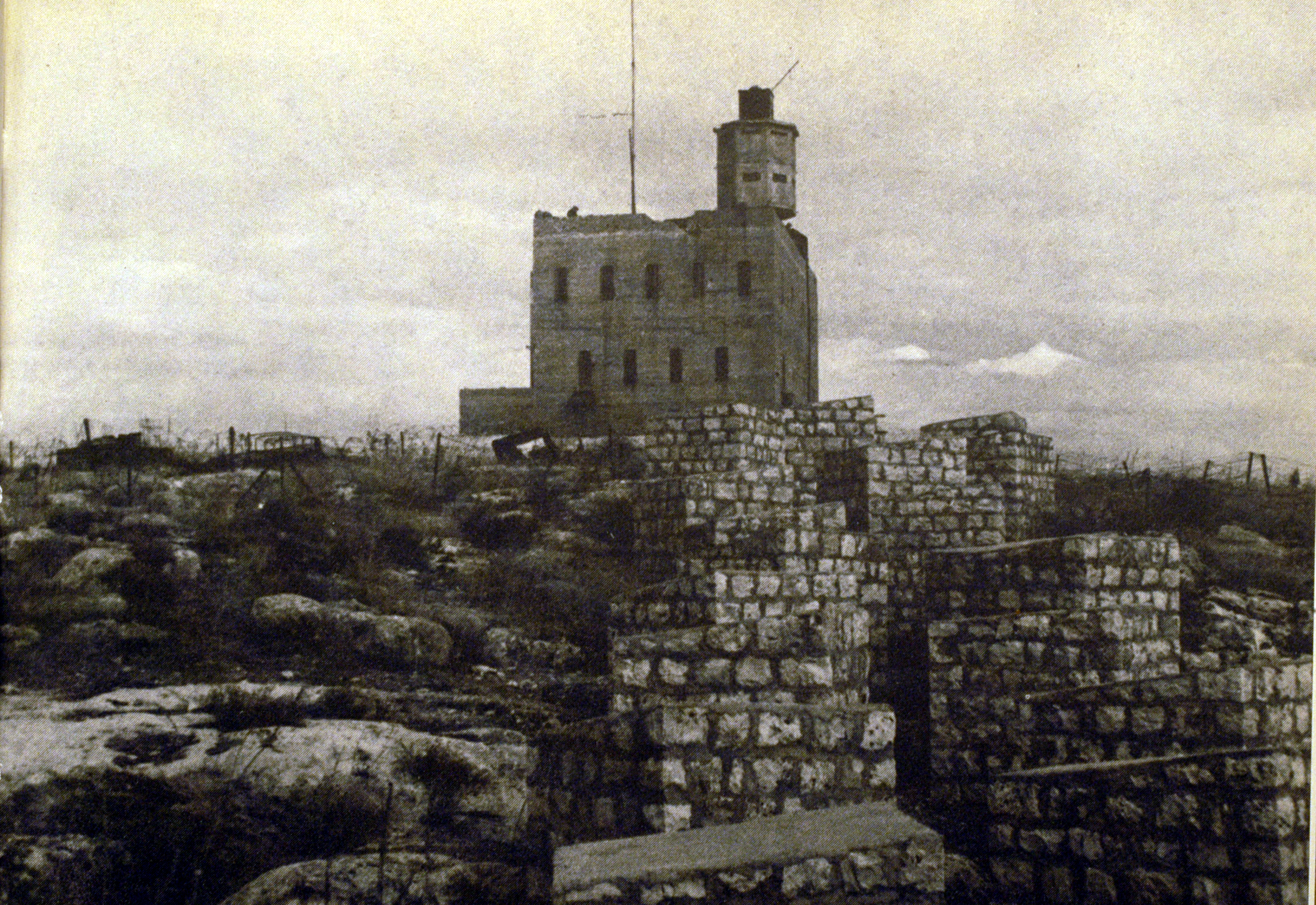
Nebi Yusha police fortress, 1948

=== 1948 war, and aftermath ===
Al-Nabi Yusha' was depopulated on May 16, in the 1948 Arab-Israeli War during Operation Yiftach led by Israeli army officer Yigal Allon who later became a key Israeli figure. An early attempt to take the village by Haganah forces during the operation ended in the deaths of 22 Haganah fighters, who had their corpses reportedly decapitated by the Arab forces.

Most of its residents ended up in refugee camps in Lebanon and Syria. In 1998, the descendants of al-Nabi Yusha' refugees were estimated at 499.

The Israeli moshav Ramot Naftali was established in 1945 south of the village, and since 1948 includes Al-Nabi Yusha' land. It is located close to the border between Al-Nabi Yusha' and the lands of Mallaha.

The Palestinian historian Walid Khalidi described the village remains in 1992 as: "The site has been fenced in with barbed wire and is buried under rubble, making access difficult. However, some evidence of the village remains: fragments of houses, tombs in the village's cemetery, and the shrine of al-Nabi Yusha'. The two domes and arched entrance of the main part of the shrine are still intact, but the thick stone walls of the rooms attached to it are broken and the entire complex of buildings is neglected; weeds sprouts from the roof. The village site is surrounded by fig trees and cactuses. The flat lands around the site are planted by Israeli farmers with apple trees, while the sloping parts are wooded or used as pasture."

== The Nabi Yusha shrine ==
The shrine was surveyed by the British School of Archaeology in 1994, who described it as rectangular structure formed around a courtyard, aligned north-south, which was entered through a gateway on the north end. The principal rooms were at the south end of the courtyard, with two major domed chambers, of which the west chamber was found to be the oldest in the whole shrine complex.

Alternative traditional sites for the Prophet's tomb are situated in Turkey (the shrine on Joshua's Hill, Istanbul), Jordan (An-Nabi Yusha' bin Noon, a Sunni shrine near the city of Al-Salt) and Iraq (the Nabi Yusha' shrine of Baghdad).

== See also ==
- Depopulated Palestinian locations in Israel
- Metzudat Koach
- Metawali
- Shia villages in Palestine

== Bibliography ==
- Berger, Uri (2015-12-09). "En-Nabi Yusha'". Hadashot Arkheologiyot – Excavations and Surveys in Israel (127).
- Biger, Gideon (2004). The boundaries of modern Palestine, 1840-1947. Routledge. p. 134. ISBN 978-0-7146-5654-0.
- Conder, C.R.; Kitchener, H.H. (1881). The Survey of Western Palestine: Memoirs of the Topography, Orography, Hydrography, and Archaeology. Vol. 1. London: Committee of the Palestine Exploration Fund.
- Government of Palestine, Department of Statistics (1945). Village Statistics, April, 1945.
- Guérin, V. (1880). Description Géographique Historique et Archéologique de la Palestine (in French). Vol. 3: Galilee, pt. 2. Paris: L'Imprimerie Nationale.
- Hadawi, S. (1970). Village Statistics of 1945: A Classification of Land and Area ownership in Palestine. Palestine Liberation Organization Research Center. Archived from the original on 2018-12-08.
- Khalidi, W. (1992). All That Remains: The Palestinian Villages Occupied and Depopulated by Israel in 1948. Washington D.C.: Institute for Palestine Studies. ISBN 0-88728-224-5.
- Lamb, Franklin. Completing The Task Of Evicting Israel From Lebanon 2009-06-02
- Mills, E., ed. (1932). Census of Palestine 1931. Population of Villages, Towns and Administrative Areas. Jerusalem: Government of Palestine.
- Morris, B. (2004). The Birth of the Palestinian Refugee Problem Revisited. Cambridge University Press. ISBN 0-521-00967-7.
- Palmer, E.H. (1881). The Survey of Western Palestine: Arabic and English Name Lists Collected During the Survey by Lieutenants Conder and Kitchener, R. E. Transliterated and Explained by E.H. Palmer. Committee of the Palestine Exploration Fund.
- Petersen, Andrew (2001). A Gazetteer of Buildings in Muslim Palestine (British Academy Monographs in Archaeology). Vol. 1. Oxford University Press. ISBN 978-0-19-727011-0. Archived from the original on 2021-05-28.
- al-Qawuqji, F. (1972): Memoirs of al-Qawuqji, Fauziin Journal of Palestine Studies
  - "Memoirs, 1948, Part I" in 1, no. 4 (Sum. 72): 27-58., dpf-file, downloadable
  - , dpf-file, downloadable
- Rubinstein, D. (6 August 2006). "The Seven Lost Villages". Haaretz. Archived from the original on 1 October 2007.
- Velde, van de, C.W.M. (1854). Narrative of a journey through Syria and Palestine in 1851 and 1852. Vol. 2. William Blackwood and son.
