= HaReut Museum =

Coordinates: 33°06′55″N 35°33′24″E

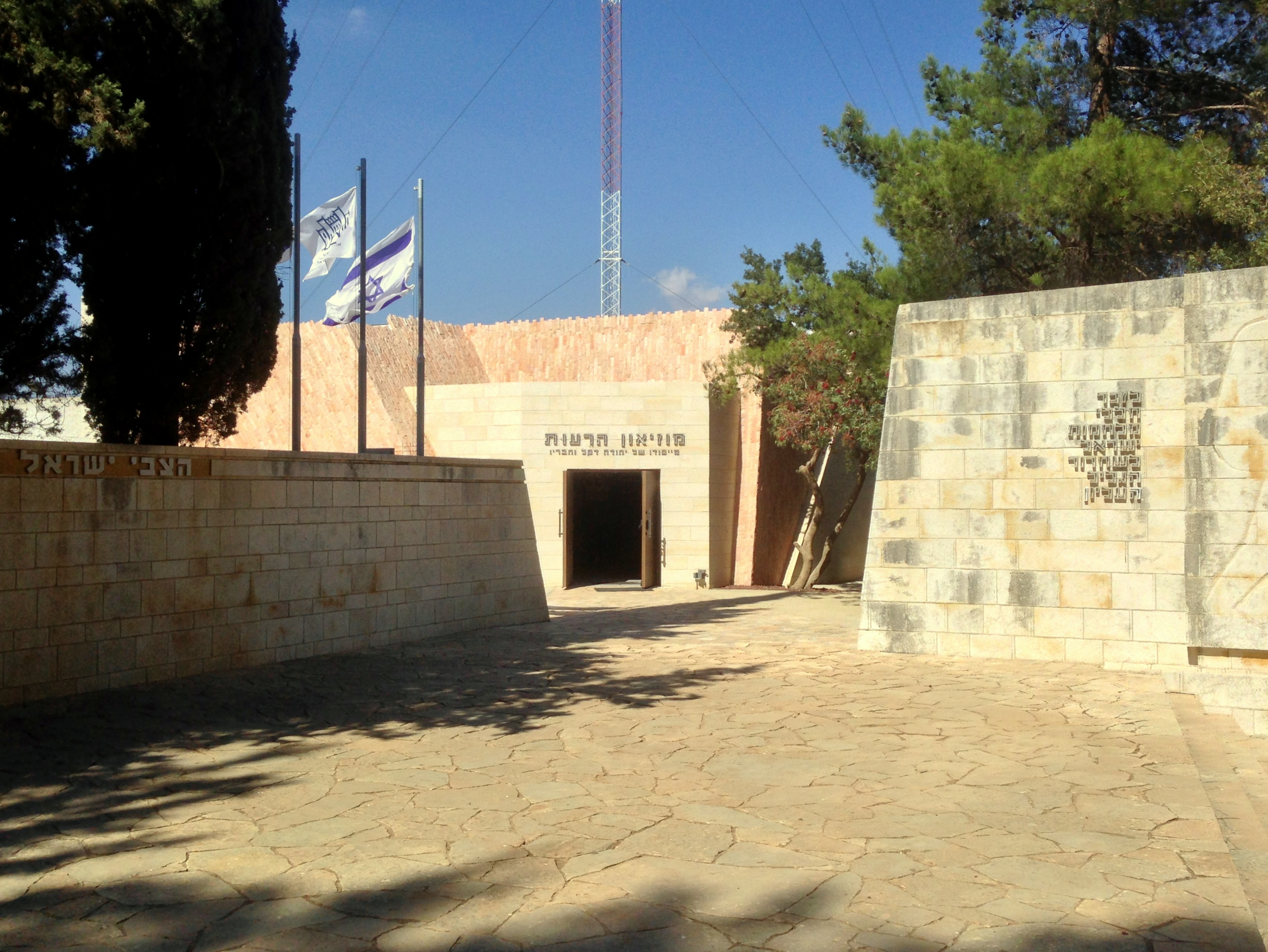
Museum entrance

The HaReut Museum (Hebrew: מוזיאון הרעות) is a museum by the Metzudat Koach (Koach Fort), Israel, dedicated to the commemoration of the battles for the fort during the 1948 Palestine war. The Council for Conservation of Heritage Sites in Israel declared the museum to be a heritage site. The capture of the fort is considered to be one of the Israeli symbols of the war, known as the War of Independence in Israel.

== History ==
The museum was established in collaboration with the Council for Conservation of Heritage Sites in Israel and the Heritage Project - Prime Minister's Office, and businessmen Boaz Dekel and Stef Wertheimer invested 6 million shekels ($1.7 million) into the project.

The groundbreaking ceremony for the museum was on January 7, 2011, together with the beginning of the conservation and restoration works at the fort. During excavations, a large, previously unknown, underground water reservoir was discovered beneath the fort.

The museum was inaugurated in January 2014. It is named after the poem "Hareut".
