= Ramot Naftali =

Moshav in northern Israel

Ramot Naftali: רמות נפתלי (Hebrew)
- Moshav
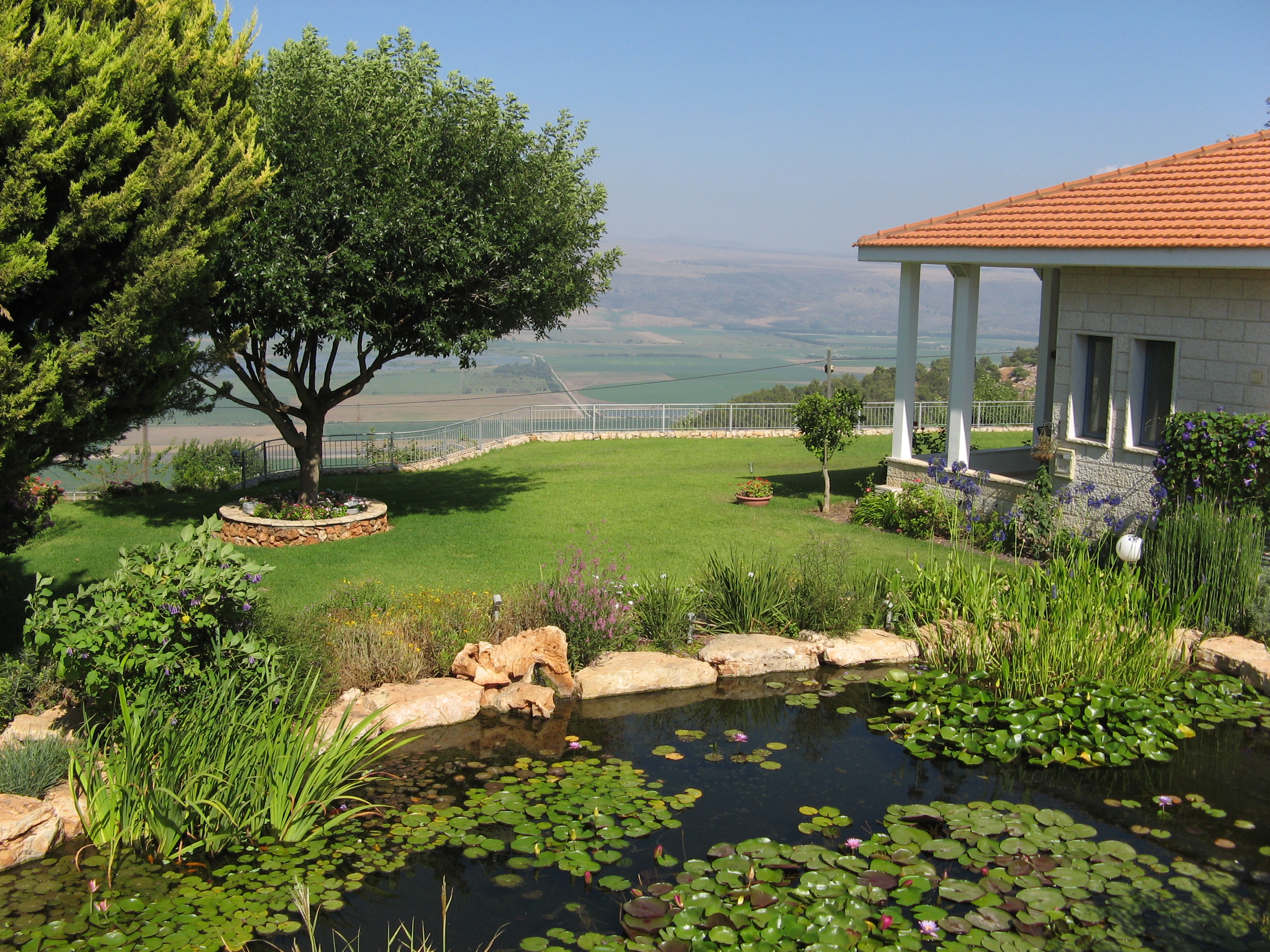

- Location within Northeast Israel Location within Israel
- Coordinates: 33°6′6″N 35°33′12″E
- Country: Israel
- District: Northern
- Subdistrict: Safed
- Council: Mevo'ot HaHermon
- Affiliation: Moshavim Movement
- Founded: 1945
- Founder: Bnei Peled
- Population (2024): 516

Ramot Naftali (Hebrew: רמות נפתלי, lit. 'Naftali Heights') is a moshav in northern Israel. Located in the Upper Galilee near the Lebanese border, it falls under the jurisdiction of Mevo'ot HaHermon Regional Council. In 2024 it had a population of 516.

== History ==
Ramot Naftali is located near the former depopulated Palestinian Arab villages of Qadas and Al-Nabi Yusha'. Qadas was formerly the Israelite town of Kedesh in ancient times.

The community is named "Ramot Naftali" (hills of Naftali) because it is located in the Naftali Mountains, which was originally in the land owned by the Tribe of Naphtali. It was founded by the Wingate group, soldiers who served under Orde Wingate in the British Army. In 1948, during an attack on Ramot Naftali, Wingate's widow Lorna accompanied the pilot of a Piper Cub on a mission to drop supplies and ammunition to the soldiers. Included in the drop was her late husband's Bible. The community was built around the Ramot Naftali fortress, which was established together with the fortresses Birya and Hukok in 1945 as part of the defense of the British army in the north, in collaboration with the Jewish Agency. The fortresses were built by the construction company Solel Boneh. The fortress today is part of a nearby military base.

In August 1963 a new nucleus of founders went to Kedesh Naftali, after the dispersal of the original members of the moshav. In the community two families remained from the first founding nucleus: Eliezer and Batya Kaufman and their three children, and the Adler family. Along with seven founders were: Ra'anan Naim, Rafael Albo, Yitzhak Sabag, Freddy Preinteh, Hananya Dadush, Zevulun Kohen and Ilan Zarka. The nucleus was composed mostly of young couples from moshavim, who had left Morocco, Tunisia and Libya. The initiative was successful, and many people joined together with the founding nucleus: Yuval Hermoni, Zevulun Kohen, the brothers Moshe and Hayyim Alon, Meir Halb, and some single men such as David Avitan, and many others. The settlers lived first in abandoned houses of the first nucleus atop the mountain, but within three years new houses were built at the foot of the mountain, which eventually were expanded.

== Geography ==
Kibbutz Malkia, Kibbutz Yiftah and Moshav Dishon are located nearby.

== Landmarks ==
Metzudat Koach, a compound of the British Mandate, where 28 fighters were killed when it was captured during the War of Independence.

== Economy ==
The moshav is known for growing apples, peaches and grapes. The grapes of Ramot Naftali are considered excellent by experts, and they are sold to the finest wineries in the land. The moshav has some boutique wineries, including Amram Winery of the vintner Amram Azulai. Some members of the moshav make their living by tourism or growing fowl.

== People ==
The people of Ramot Naftali are known for their contributions to the Paratroopers Brigade and to elite army units. Eitan Blahsan, a commander of Sayeret Tzanhanim, was born in Ramot Naftali, and was killed in a battle in Lebanon. Army members had high hopes for him and thought he might someday rise to Chief of Staff (Ramatkal). Mitzpe Eitan was erected as a memorial near the moshav, overlooking the Lebanon mountains and his parents' house.

== Gallery ==
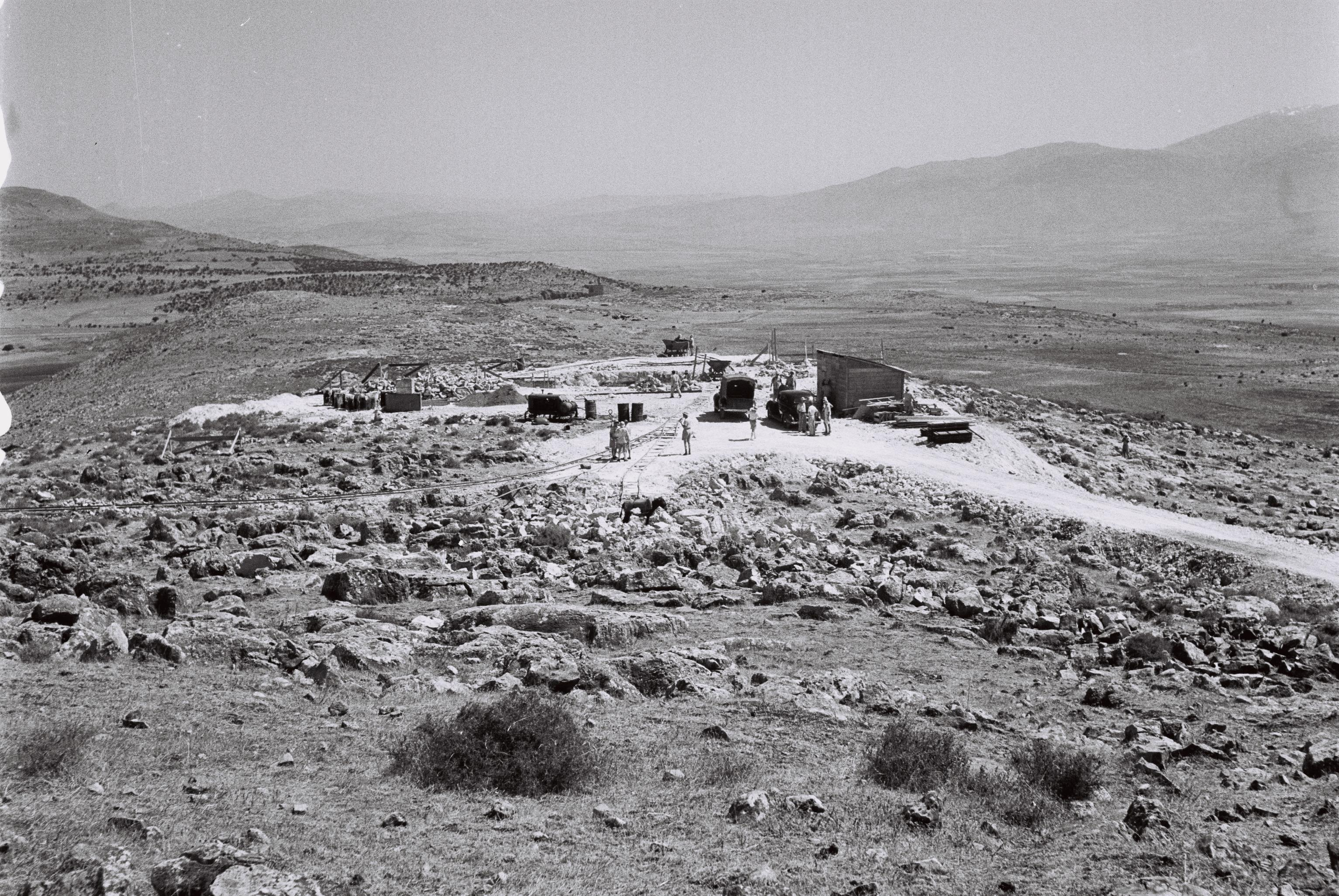
Ramot Naftali, 1945

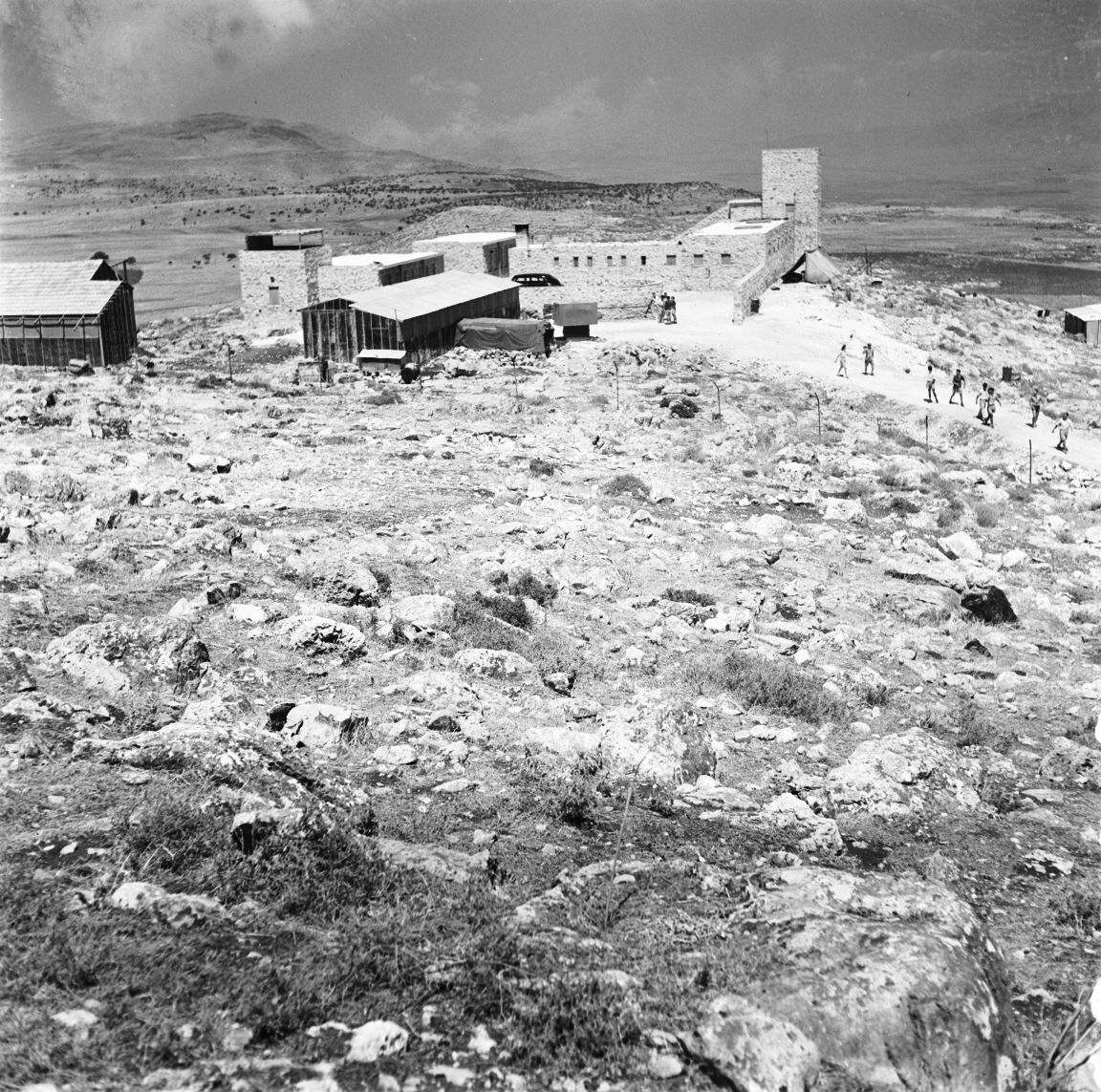
Ramot Naftali, 1946

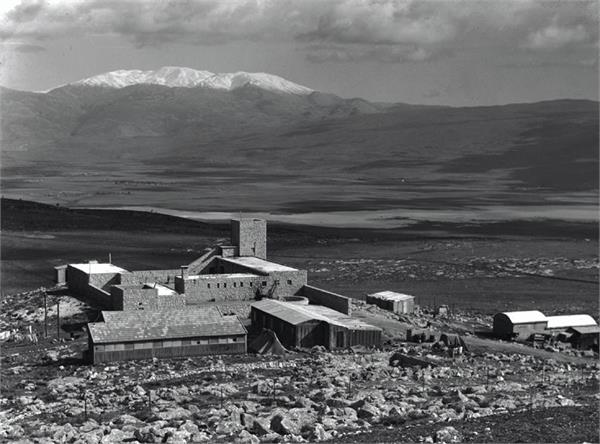
Ramot Naftali with Mount Hermon in distance, 1947

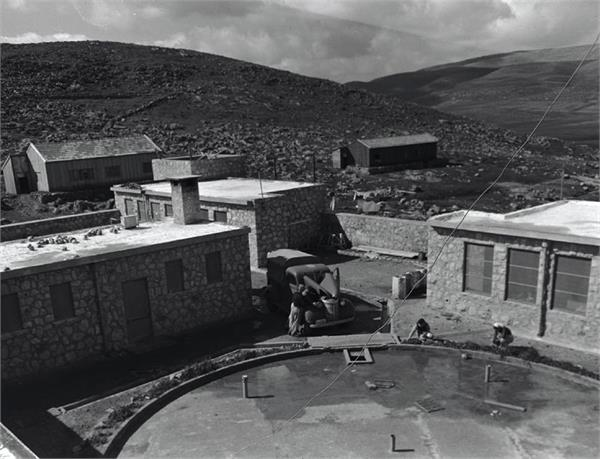
Ramot Naftali, 1947

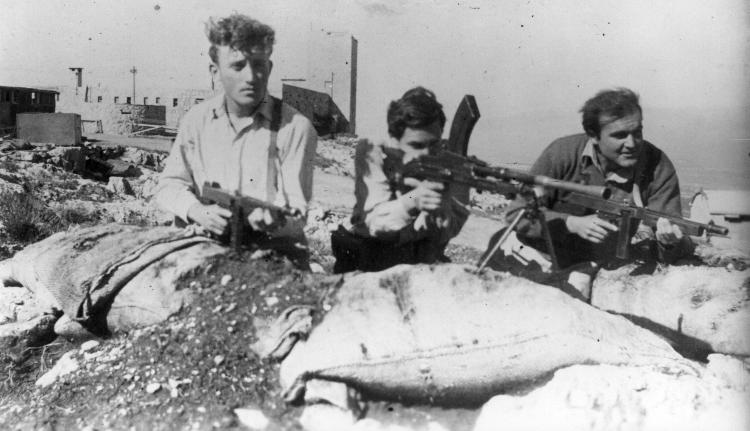
Members of the Yiftach Brigade at Ramot Naftali, 1948

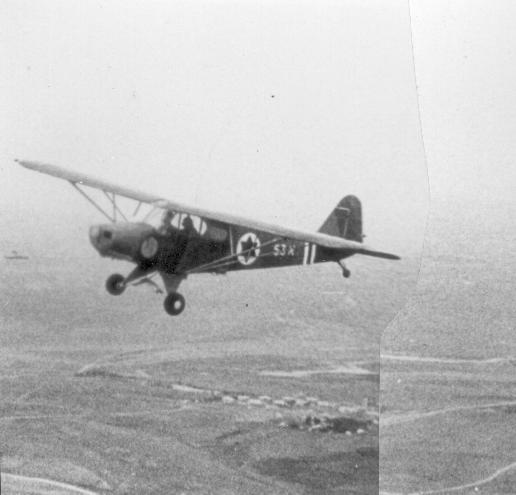
Israel Air Force plane above Ramot Naftali, 1948

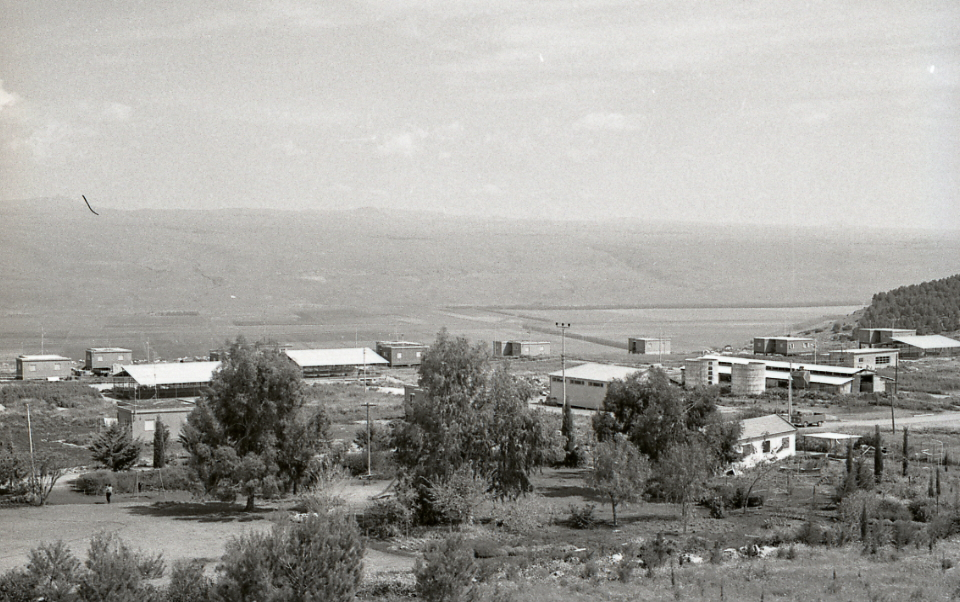
Ramot Naftali, 1970

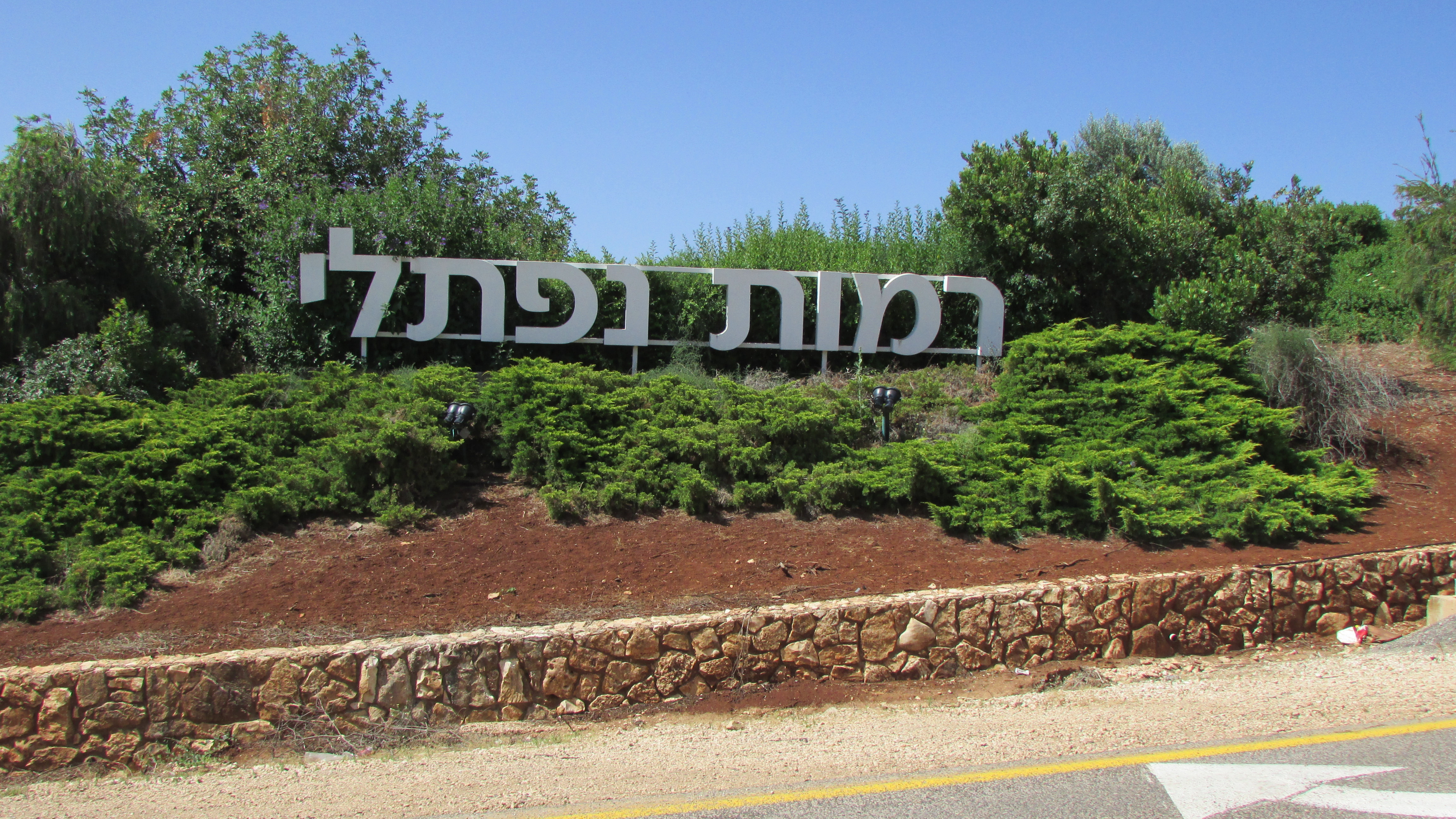
Entrance to Ramot Naftali

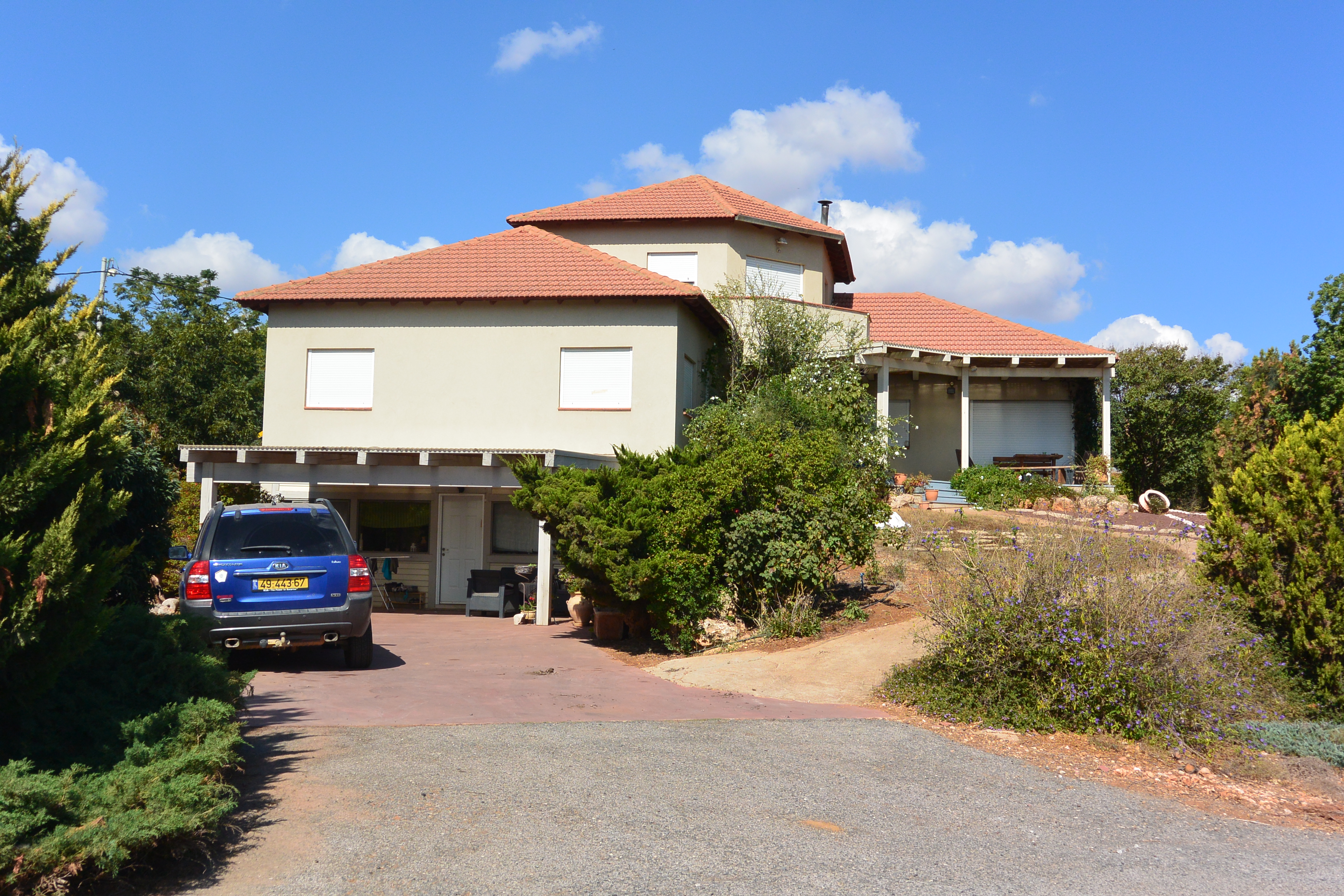
House in Ramot Naftali

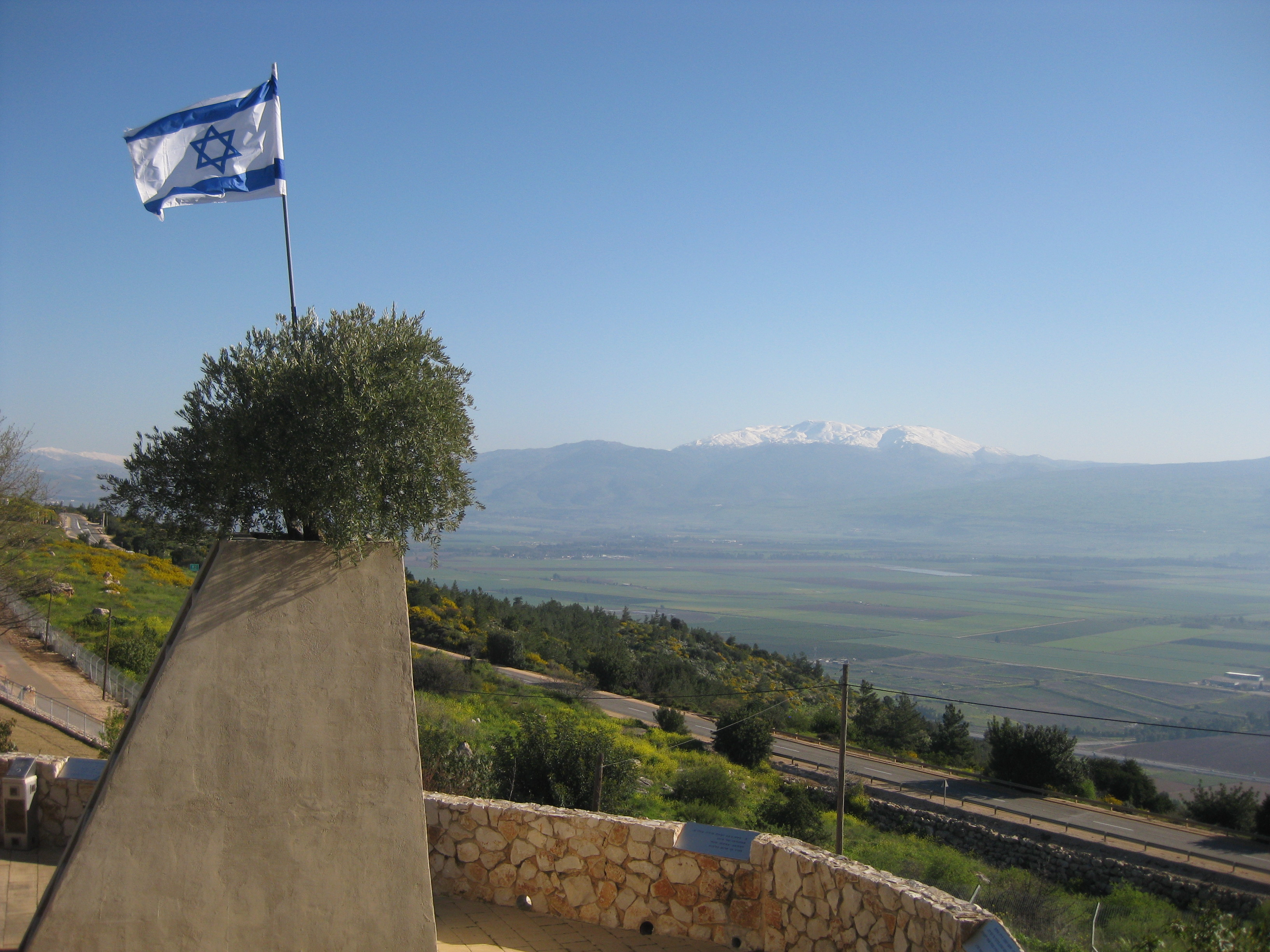
View of the Mount Hermon from Ramot Naftali
