= Kedesh =

Archeological site in northern Israel

Tel Kedesh
- Cydessa
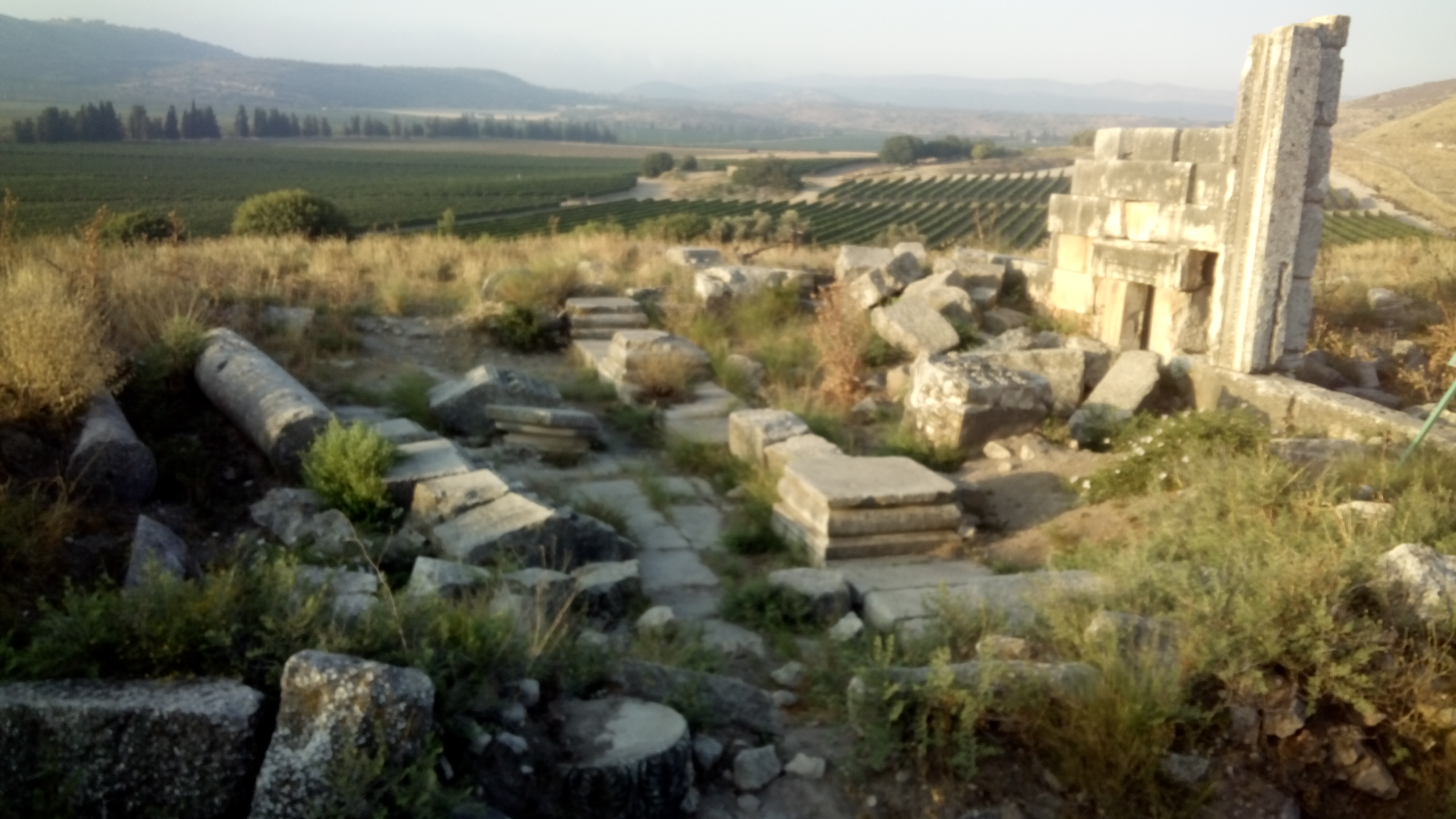
- Tel Kedesh

- Location within Israel Location within Northeast Israel
- 33.111638°N 35.529517°E
- Type: Settlement
- Location: Northern District, Israel
- Region: Upper Galilee

Site notes
- Condition: In ruins
- Public access: yes

Kedesh (alternate spellings: Qedesh, Cadesh, Cydessa) was an ancient Canaanite and later Israelite settlement in Upper Galilee, mentioned several times in the Hebrew Bible. Its remains are located in Tel Kedesh, 3 km (1.9 mi) northeast of the modern Kibbutz Malkiya in Israel on the Israeli-Lebanese border.

The settlement is first documented in the Book of Joshua as a Canaanite citadel conquered by the Israelites and designated as a Levitical city and City of Refuge. Jewish tradition holds that Deborah, Barak and Jael were buried near Kedesh.

In the 8th century BCE, it was captured by Tiglath-Pileser III of Assyria and its inhabitants deported. During the 5th century BCE, it possibly became the capital of the Achaemenid province of Upper Galilee. In the Hellenistic period, Kedesh was the site of battles involving Jonathan Apphus and Seleucid king Demetrius II. In the Roman period, Josephus records Jewish attacks on Kedesh during the First Jewish–Roman War, with Titus establishing a camp there. The site was later mentioned in Eusebius. Excavations from 1997 to 2012 revealed significant Persian and Hellenistic administrative buildings and a large Roman temple complex.

As Qadas (also Cadasa; Arabic: قدس), it was a Palestinian village located 17 kilometers northeast of Safad that was depopulated during the 1947–1949 Palestine war. One of seven villages populated by Shia Muslims, called the Metawalis, that fell within the boundaries of British Mandate Palestine, Qadas is today known as the tell of the ancient biblical city of Kedesh. The village of Qadas contained many natural springs which served as the village water supply and a Roman temple dating back to the 2nd century.

== History ==
=== Early Bronze Age ===
In EB II (c. 3050/3000–2900 BCE), Tel Qadesh (50 ha) was one of the largest sites in this part of the Levant with a complex fortification system. It was a regional hub with pottery belonging to the South Levantine Metallic Ware (SLMW).

=== Iron Age ===
Kedesh Naphtali was first documented in the Book of Joshua as a Canaanite citadel conquered by the Israelites under the leadership of Joshua. Ownership of Kedesh was turned over by lot to the Tribe of Naphtali and subsequently, at the command of God, Kedesh was set apart by Joshua as a Levitical city and one of the Cities of Refuge along with Shechem and Kiriath Arba (Hebron) (Joshua 20:7).

According to Jewish tradition, Deborah the prophetess, Barak the son of Abinoam and Jael, the wife of Heber the Kenite, as also Heber, were buried near the spring beneath the town of Kedesh.

=== Assyrian period ===
In the 8th century BCE, during the reign of Pekah, king of Northern Israel, Tiglath-Pileser III of the Neo-Assyrian Empire took Kedesh and deported its inhabitants to Assyria. (2 Kings 15:29)

=== Persian period ===
Later, during the 5th century BCE, Kedesh may have become the capital for the Achaemenid-controlled and Tyrian-administered province of the Upper Galilee.

Under Persian rule, the site was home to a monumental administrative compound dated to approximately 500 BCE, operating on behalf of the Tyrian royal house. Vessels suitable for agricultural goods are predominant, indicating that the site was concerned with the storage and management of produce. Among the findings from the Persian period is a clay bulla that preserves an impression made by a stamp seal bearing a Neo-Babylonian style motif closely paralleled by seals used in Nippur in the late 5th-century BCE. Petrographic analysis demonstrates that the clay of the bulla comes from the area of Kedesh, indicating that the sealing took place locally and that papyrus scrolls were used at the site.

=== Hellenistic period ===
In 259 BCE, Kedesh was mentioned by Zenon of Kaunos, a traveling merchant from Ptolemaic Egypt, in the Zenon Papyri.

The Persian-period administrative compound remained in use into the Hellenistic period, both under Ptolemaic and Seleucid control; in the first half of the 2nd century BC, the Seleucids used it for archiving documents, as the Persians had done before them. Remains from the Hellenistic period include Phoenician amphriskoi recovered from the archive complex. Organic residue analysis has identified their contents as cedar oil derived from Lebanese cedars, mixed with aromatic resin. Cedar oil is known to have been used in this period for the preservation of papyri.

According to 1 Maccabees, a battle between Hasmonean leader Jonathan Apphus and the Seleucid emperor Demetrius II Nicator took place in Kedesh. Between 145 BCE and 143 BCE, Kedesh (Cades) was overthrown by Jonathan Maccabeus in his fight against Seleucid king Demetrius II Nicator.

=== Roman period ===
According to Josephus, after the Jerusalem riots of 66, the Jews attacked a series of gentile cities, including Cydessa (Kedesh), then a Tyrian village, now in Roman Syria. During the First Jewish–Roman War, Titus established his camp there before he departed for battle with John of Gischala.

From 1997 to 2012, Tel Kedesh was excavated by a team from the University of Michigan's Kelsey Museum of Archaeology in conjunction with the University of Minnesota, focusing in 2010 and 2012 on the Persian and Hellenistic administrative building of enormous size and complexity. Its expensive decoration and the variety and quantity of artifacts have revealed a dominating administrative presence in the Kedesh valley and the Upper Galilee lasting nearly 350 years. A large Roman temple complex was built there.

Eusebius, writing about the place in his Onomasticon, says: "Kedesh. A priestly city in the inheritance of Naphtali. Previously it was a city of refuge 'in Galilee in the hill country of Naphtali.' The 'king of the Assyrians' destroyed it (2 Kings 15:29). This is (now) Kydissos (Κυδισσός), twenty miles from Tyre near Paneas."

== Kedesh of Naphtali ==
Identification of the biblical "Kedesh of Naphtali" (Judges 4:6, 10) has been the subject of archaeological and historical debate. While many hold the ancient site to be in Upper Galilee, near the Lebanese border, Israeli archaeologist, Yohanan Aharoni, held the view that it lay in Lower Galilee, near the Valley of Jezreel, at a site which bears the same name (now Khirbet Qadish). Some prominent archaeological publications have, therefore, listed the site as being east of the "Jabneel valley" in "Lower Galilee".

== Excavation project at Tel Kedesh ==
From 1997–2012, archaeological excavations were conducted at the Tel Kedesh site by Sharon Herbert and Andrea Berlin on behalf of the University of Michigan. The excavations revealed an enormous Persian-Hellenistic administrative building built in the later sixth century BC. Over the next 350 years, this complex provided a stage for interactions between imperial powers, provincial administrators and local elites – as control shifted from the Achaemenid Persians, to the Ptolemies of Egypt, and then the Seleucids of Syria.

=== Middle Ages ===
Qadas قدس Kades, Kadas, Cadasa
- Village
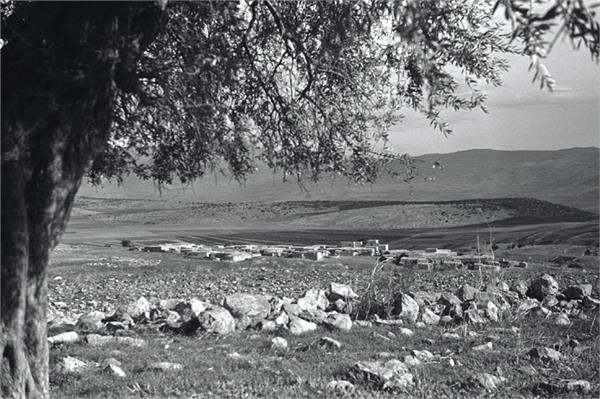
- Qadas 1939
- Etymology: Kadesh
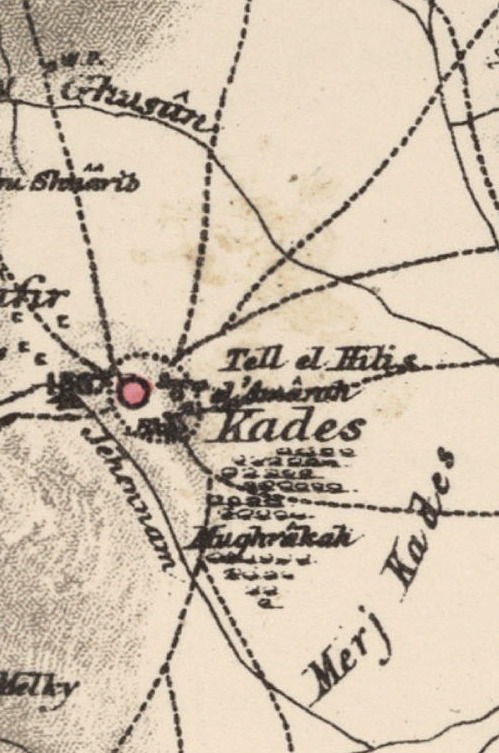
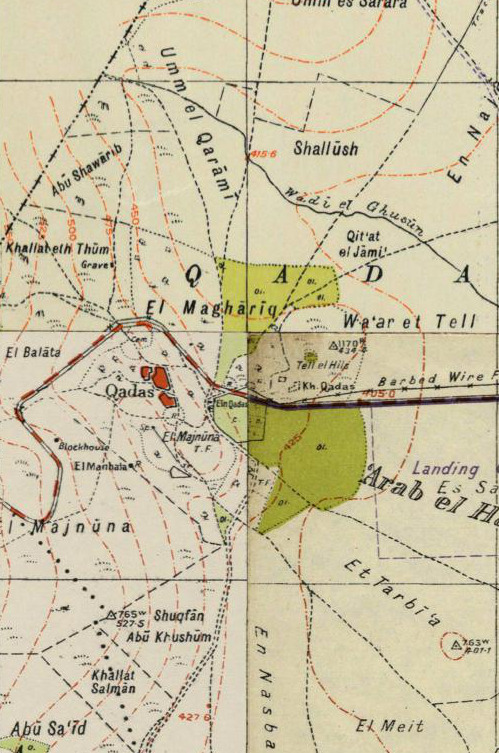
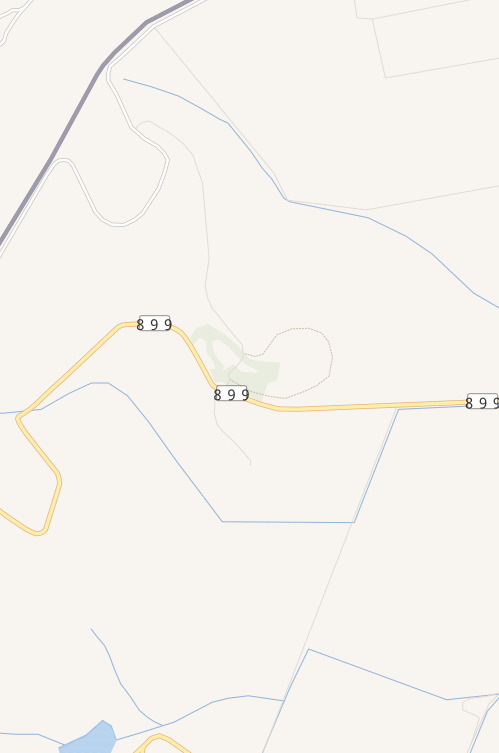
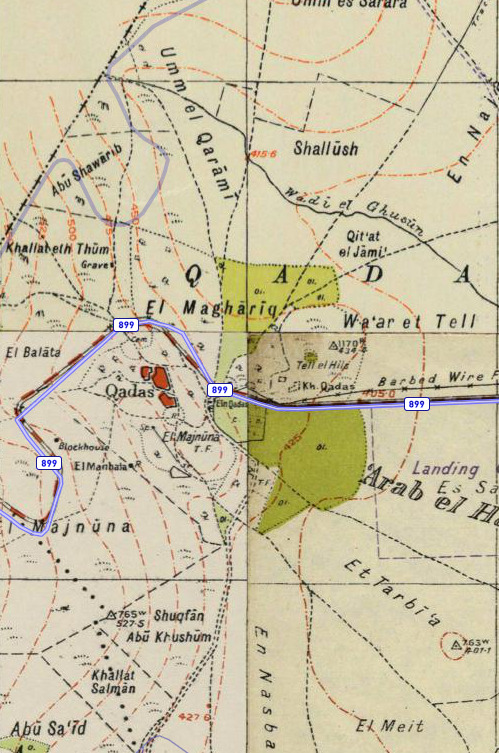
- 1870s map 1940s map modern map 1940s with modern overlay map A series of historical maps of the area around Qadas (click the buttons)

- Location within Mandatory Palestine
- Palestine grid: 199/279
- Geopolitical entity: Mandatory Palestine
- Subdistrict: Safad
- Date of depopulation: 28 May 1948

Area
  - Total: 14,139 dunams (14.139 km^{2}; 5.459 sq mi)

Population (1945)
  - Total: 390
- Cause(s) of depopulation: Influence of nearby town's fall
- Current Localities: Yiftah, Malkia, Ramot Naftali

Under the rule of the Islamic Abbasid Caliphate in the 10th century CE, Qadas was a town in Jund al-Urrdun ("District of Jordan"). According to al-Muqaddasi in 985, "Qadas was a small town on the slope of the mountain. It is 'full of good things'. Jabal Amilah is the district which is in its neighborhood. The town possesses three springs from which the people drink, and they have a bath below the city. The mosque is in the market, and in its court is a palm tree. The climate of this place is very hot. Near Qadas is the (Hulah) Lake."

Ishtori Haparchi, visiting the holy sites in the early fourteenth-century wrote of Kedesh: "About half a day's distance southward of Paneas, known in Arabic as Banias, is Kedesh, in the mountain of Naphtali, and it is [now] called Qades."

=== Ottoman era ===
In 1517, Palestine was incorporated into the Ottoman Empire and in the 1596 tax records, the village appeared as Qadas, under the nahiya ("subdistrict") of Tibnin, under Sanjak Safad, with a population of 49 households and 9 bachelors, (an estimated population of 319 people), all Muslim. They paid a fixed tax-rate of 25% on various agricultural products, such as wheat, barley, olives, cotton, orchards, beehives, and goats, as well as a press that processed either grapes or olives; a total of 10,472 akçe.

Victor Guérin visited in 1875, and noted: "The village of this name, which has at most 300 inhabitants, occupies barely a third of a beautiful hill, formerly entirely covered with dwellings and surrounded by a wall built of dressed stones, of which only a few levelling are now visible. The houses of the village almost all contain ancient fragments from toppled buildings. In one, among others, I am shown, on a column, a sculpted head representing the figure of the sun with a crown of rays".

In 1881, the PEF's Survey of Western Palestine (SWP), Qadas was described as a stone-built village, situated on a spur of a ridge. The population, which was estimated to be between 100 and 300, cultivated fig and olive trees. SWP also noted that the "Metawali" from Qadas went to nearby Al-Nabi Yusha' to venerate the name of Joshua.

=== British Mandate era ===
Qadas was a part of the French-controlled Lebanon until 1923, when the British Mandate of Palestine's borders were delineated to include it.

Rainfall and the abundance of springs allowed the village to develop a prosperous agricultural economy based on grain, fruit, and olives.

In the 1931 census of Palestine, conducted by the British Mandate authorities, Qadas had a population of 273; 1 Christian and 272 Muslims, in a total of 56 houses.

In the 1945 statistics the village had a total of 5,709 dunums of land allotted to cereals, while 156 dunums were irrigated or used for orchards.

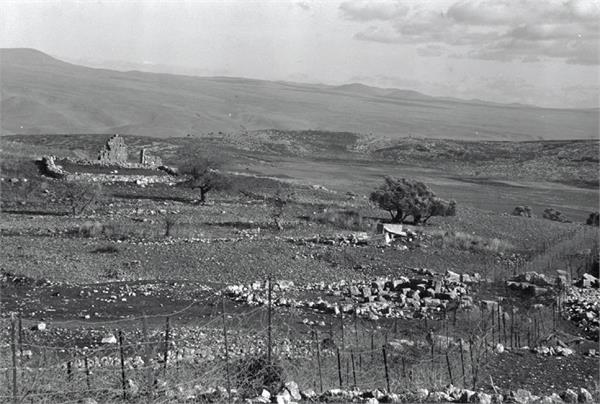
Qadas ruins on village land 1939

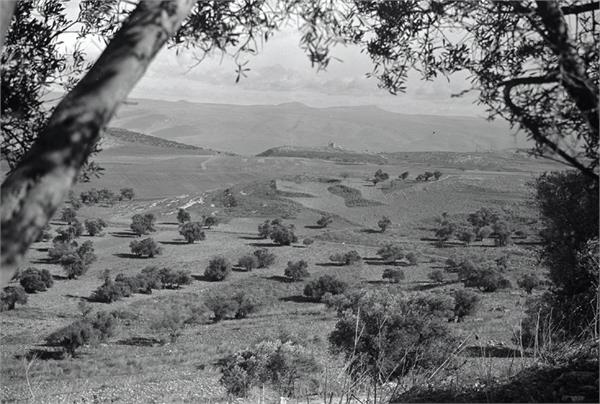
Qadas village land 1939

=== 1948 war, and aftermath ===
Qadas was occupied by Israeli forces during Operation Yiftach on 28 May 1948. Defended by the Arab Liberation Army and the Lebanese army, its inhabitants fled under the influence of the fall of, or exodus from, neighbouring towns.

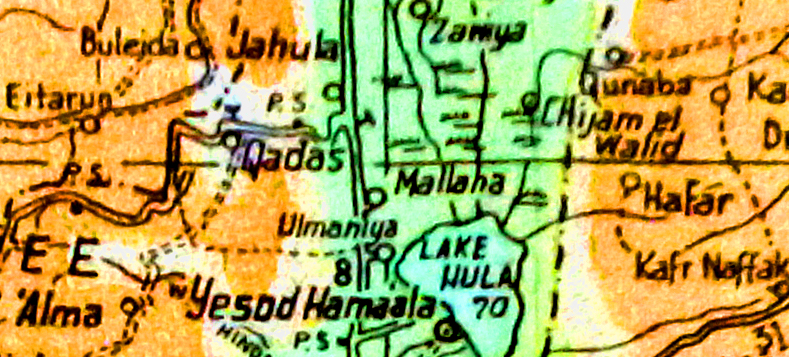
Qadas 1946

In June, 1948, kibbutz Manara requested land from the newly depopulated village of Qadas, as it was "suitable for winter crops".

The settlement of Yiftach was built in 1948 to the northeast of the village site on lands belonging to Qadas. The village land is also used by the settlements of Malkiyya, founded in 1949, and Ramot Naftali, established in 1945.

Walid Khalidi described the remaining structures of the former village in 1992 as follows:

Stones from the destroyed houses are strewn over the fenced-in site, and a few partially destroyed walls near the spring are visible. The flat portions of the surrounding lands are planted with apple trees; the spring provides drinking water for cattle.

Hassan Nasrallah, the secretary-general of Hezbollah, has publicly recalled on occasion the fate of Qadas and the other Metawali villages in his references to the 1948 annexation of several Lebanese villages, the expulsion of their residents, the expropriation of their property and the destruction of their homes.

As of 2023, an archaeological project was underway to investigate the recent history of Qadas before its destruction. Team leader Raphael Greenberg noted that his project was unusual in its focus on Palestinian remains, contrary to the usual practice of digging around or through them to reach what is beneath.

== See also ==
- Al-Malkiyya
- Shia villages in Palestine

== Bibliography ==
- Negev, Avraham; Gibson, Shimon, eds. (2001). Kedesh (b) (Tel; Qades), and Kedesh-Naphtali (snippet view). New York and London: Continuum. p. 278. ISBN 0-8264-1316-1.
- Conder, C.R.; Kitchener, H.H. (1881). The Survey of Western Palestine: Memoirs of the Topography, Orography, Hydrography, and Archaeology. Vol. 1. London: Committee of the Palestine Exploration Fund. (SWP I, pp. 226-227)
- Department of Statistics (1945). Village Statistics, April, 1945. Government of Palestine.
- Guérin, V. (1880). Description Géographique Historique et Archéologique de la Palestine (in French). Vol. 3: Galilee, pt. 2. Paris: L'Imprimerie Nationale.
- Hadawi, S. (1970). Village Statistics of 1945: A Classification of Land and Area ownership in Palestine. Palestine Liberation Organization Research Center.
- Hütteroth, W.-D.; Abdulfattah, K. (1977). Historical Geography of Palestine, Transjordan and Southern Syria in the Late 16th Century. Erlanger Geographische Arbeiten, Sonderband 5. Erlangen, Germany: Vorstand der Fränkischen Geographischen Gesellschaft. ISBN 3-920405-41-2.
- Khalidi, W. (1992). All That Remains: The Palestinian Villages Occupied and Depopulated by Israel in 1948. Washington D.C.: Institute for Palestine Studies. ISBN 0-88728-224-5.
- Mills, E., ed. (1932). Census of Palestine 1931. Population of Villages, Towns and Administrative Areas. Jerusalem: Government of Palestine.
- Morris, B. (2004). The Birth of the Palestinian Refugee Problem Revisited. Cambridge University Press. ISBN 978-0-521-00967-6.
- Mukaddasi (1886). Description of Syria, including Palestine. London: Palestine Pilgrims' Text Society. (p. 70)
- Palmer, E.H. (1881). The Survey of Western Palestine: Arabic and English Name Lists Collected During the Survey by Lieutenants Conder and Kitchener, R. E. Transliterated and Explained by E.H. Palmer. Committee of the Palestine Exploration Fund.
- Rhode, H. (1979). Administration and Population of the Sancak of Safed in the Sixteenth Century. Columbia University. Archived from the original on 2020-03-01.
- Strange, le, G. (1890). Palestine Under the Moslems: A Description of Syria and the Holy Land from A.D. 650 to 1500. Committee of the Palestine Exploration Fund.
