= Maqam an-Nabi Yusha' =

Legendary tomb of Joshua; former Shi'ite mosque in Israel

- مقام النبي يوشع
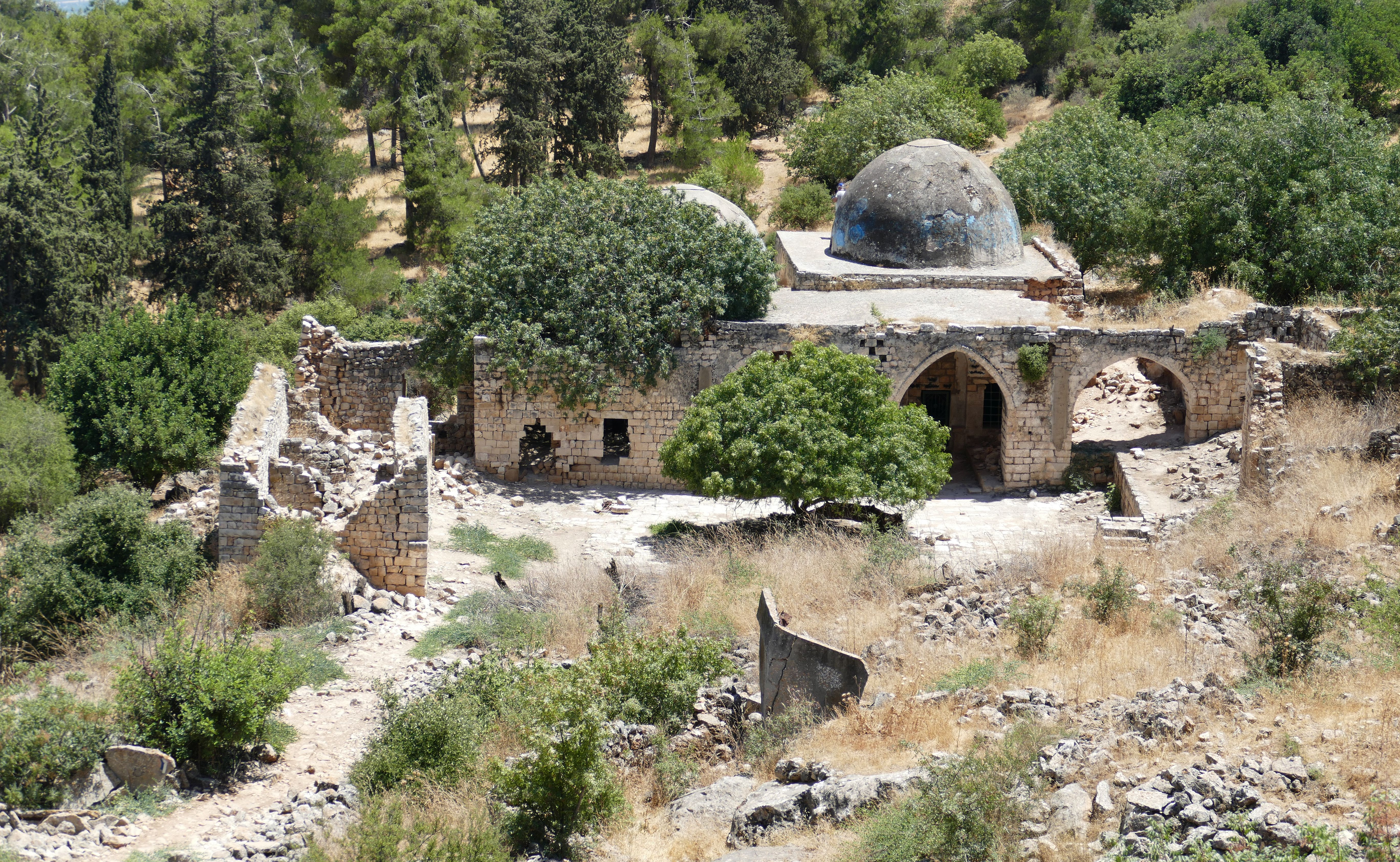
- Maqam an-Nabi Yusha' in 2022

- Location of the former mosque in northeast Israel

Religion
- Affiliation: Shia Islam (former)
- Ecclesiastical or organisational status: Mosque (former); Shrine
- Status: Inactive (partial ruins)

Location
- Location: Safad, Northern District
- Country: Israel
- Interactive map of Maqam an-Nabi Yusha'
- Coordinates: 33°06′46″N 35°33′24″E

Architecture
- Type: Islamic architecture
- Completed: 18th century

Specifications
- Dome: Two
- Shrines: One: Joshua (desecrated)

The Maqam an-Nabi Yusha' (Arabic: مقام النبي يوشع) is a former Shi'ite mosque and the shrine, now in a partial ruinous state, located in the depopulated village of Al-Nabi Yusha' in Safed, in the Northern District of Israel. A mausoleum in the structure, one of the historic maqams in the Middle East, is believed to entomb the remains of the biblical Joshua.

== History ==
The religious complex was founded in the 18th century by the aristocratic Alghul family. During the Mandate period, the residents of Al-Nabi Yusha' (who were mostly Shi'ites) celebrated an annual mawsim festival at the site dedicated to the entombed prophet. In 2018, the site was vandalized by unknown perpetrators, who sprayed Talmudic graffiti on its walls.

== Architecture ==
The Maqam an-Nabi Yusha' is a rectangular structure formed around a courtyard aligned north–south with an arched entrance on the north end while the two domed chambers, including the shrine-mausoleum, were located on the south end of the complex. The shrine is surrounded by fig trees and species of cactus growing around it.

== Gallery ==
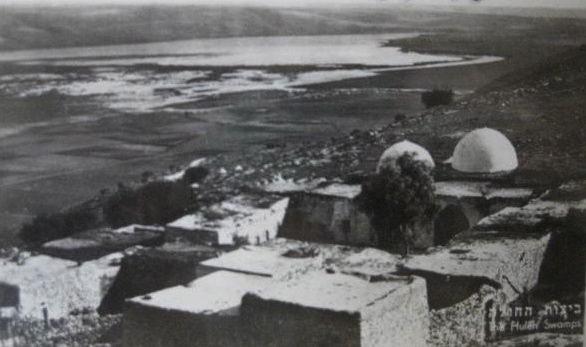
The Maqam an-Nabi Yusha', c. 1930s, before it was ruined

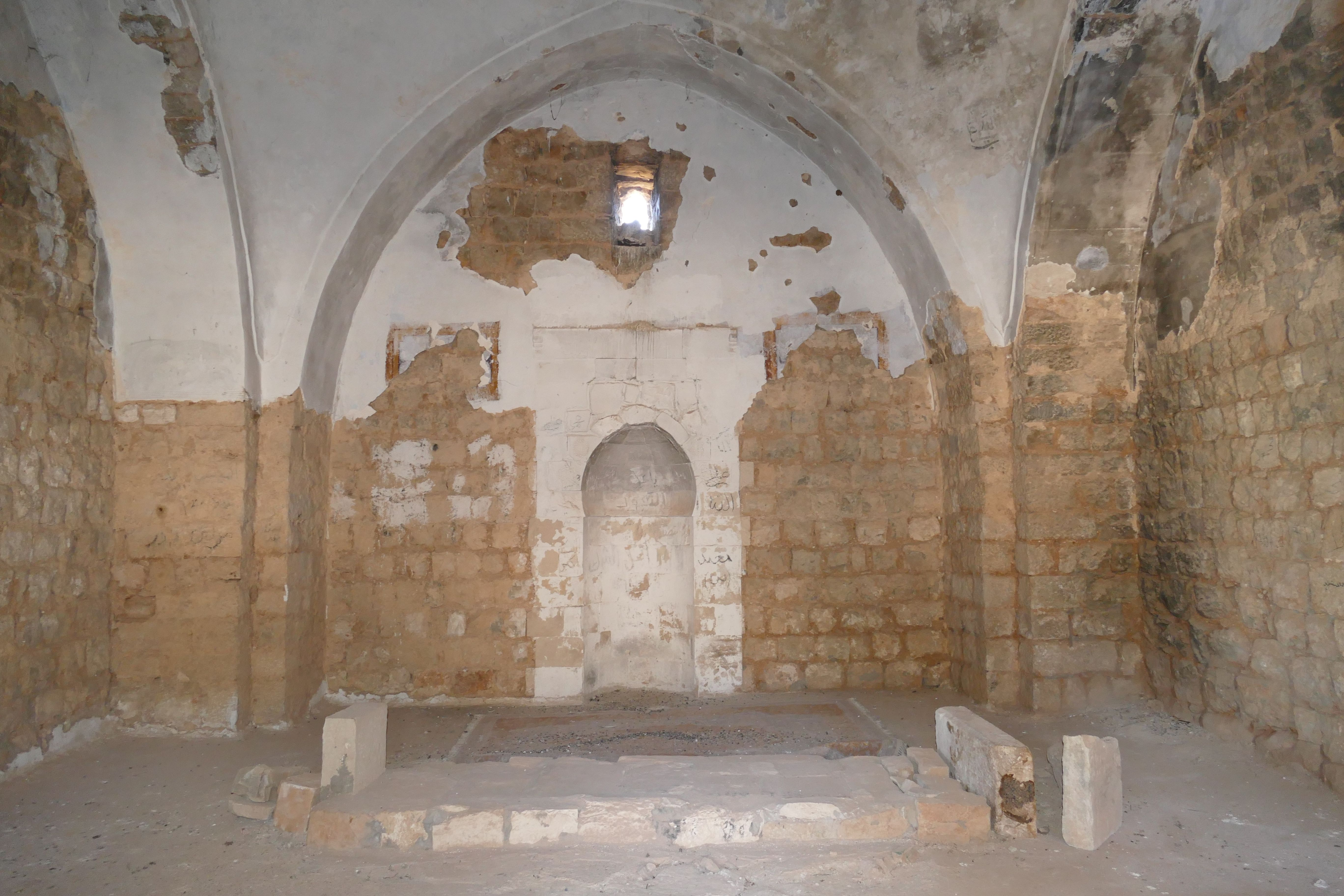
The interior of the shrine-mausoleum, the simple grave dedicated to Joshua is visible in front of the mihrab, painted in white

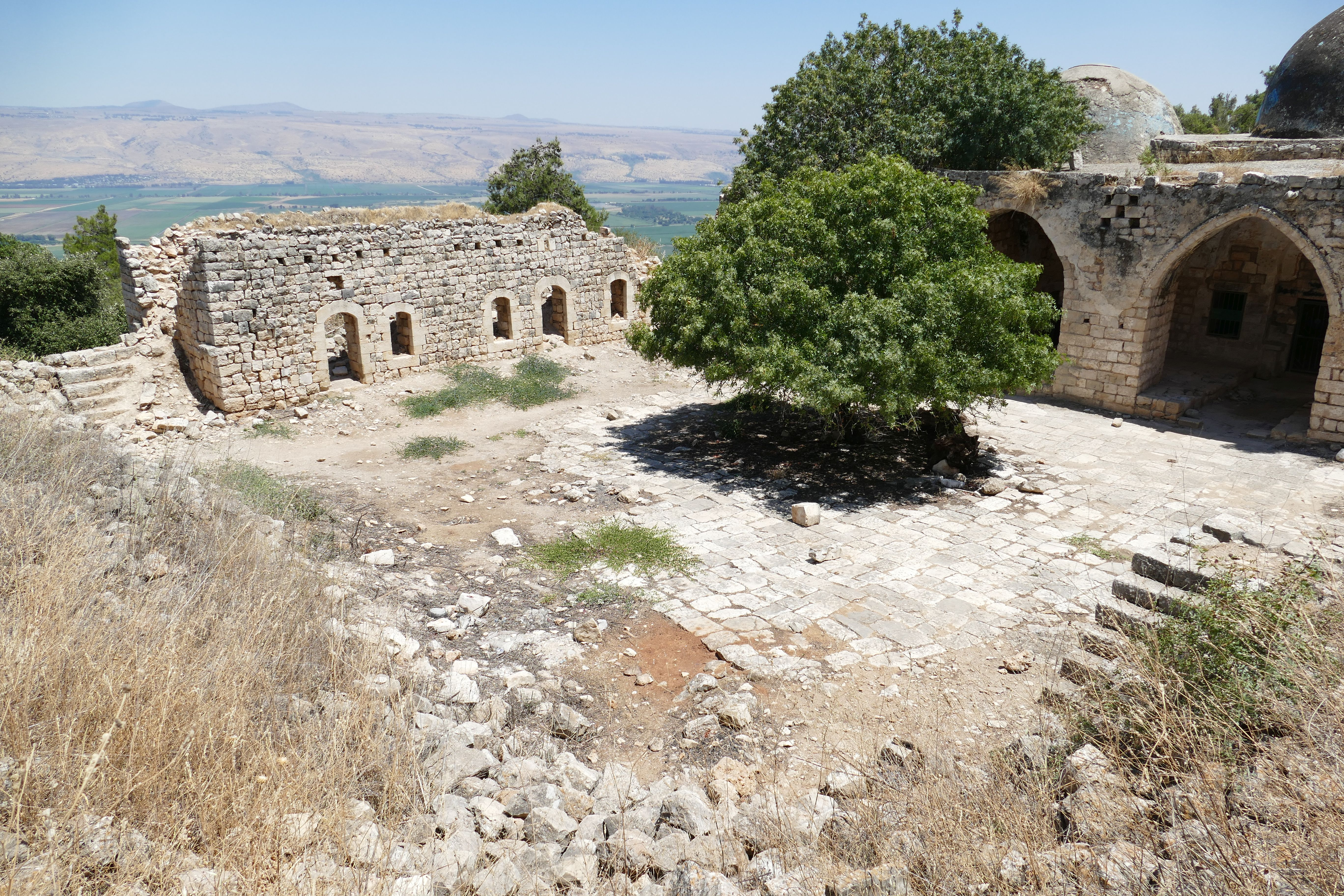
Courtyard of the Maqam an-Nabi Yusha'

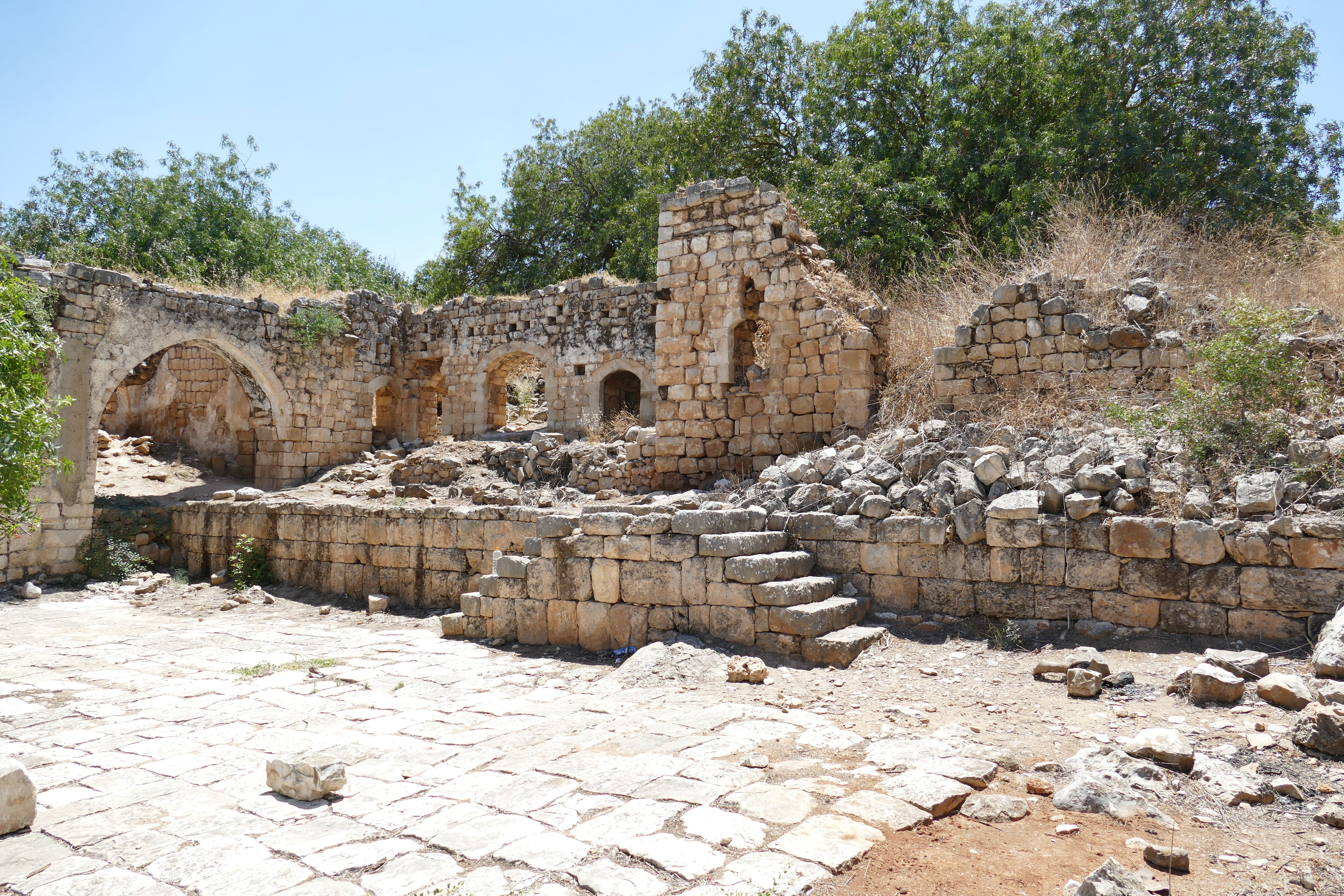
Ruins of the hallways of the mosque

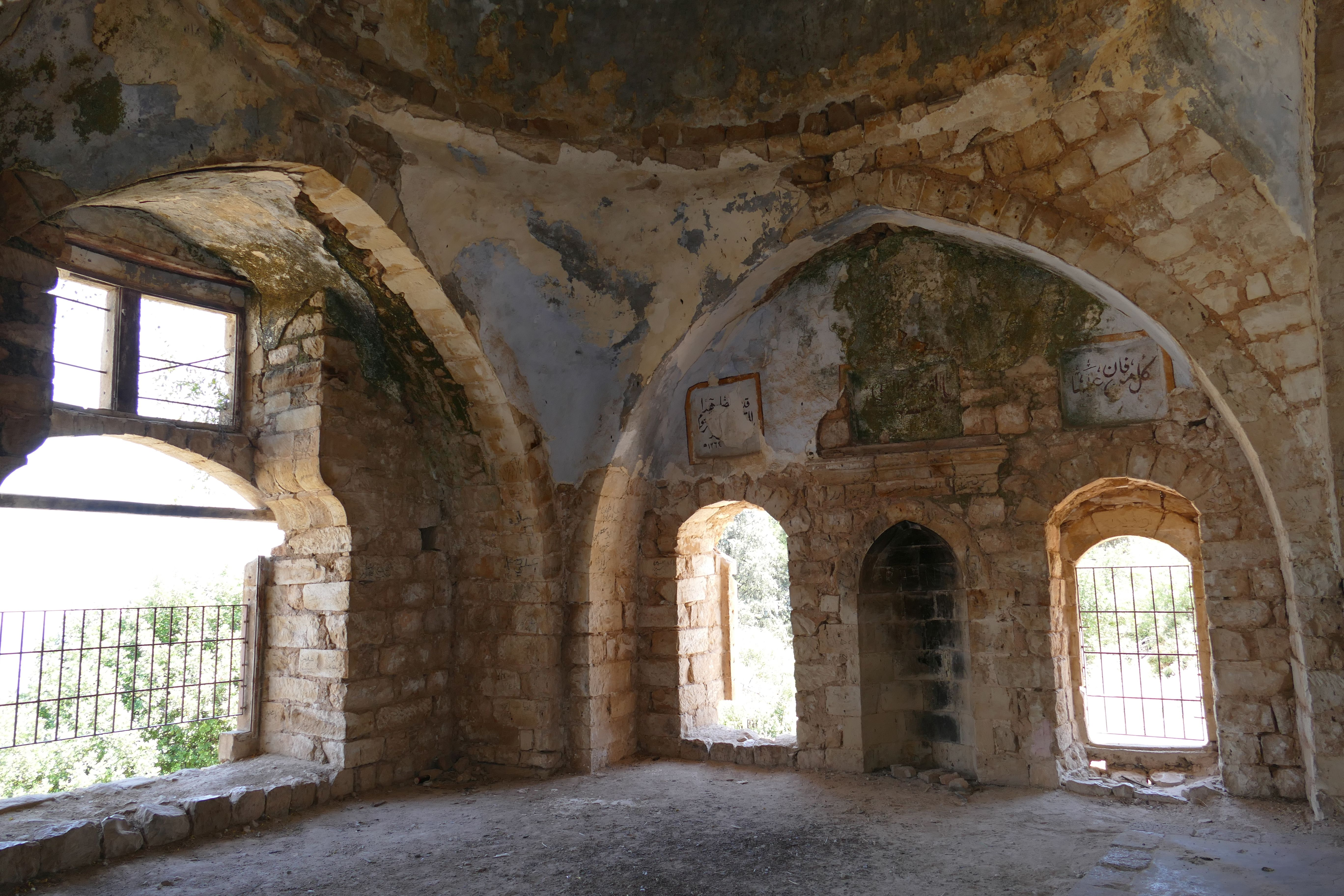
Inside the mosque part's main chamber

== See also ==
- Islam in Israel
- Maqam (shrine)
- Maqam Nabi Yusha' in Jordan
- Tomb of Joshua
