= List of projectile attacks from Lebanon on Israel and the Golan Heights =

This is a list of rocket, mortar and projectile attacks on Israel and the Israeli-occupied Golan Heights carried out by Palestinian militant groups and/or Muslim Shia or Sunni militant groups from Lebanon.

== Palestinian insurgency (1968–1982) ==
- June 1982: Twenty villages were targeted in Galilee bombardment by the PLO and 3 Israelis were wounded.

== Conflict with Hezbollah ==
- On 31 March 1995, a rocket attack on Nahariyya in Western Galilee kills an 18-year-old.
- April 9, 1996, A heavy rocket barrage, launched by Hezbollah upon the cities of Galilee caused the initiation of the Operation Grapes of Wrath by the IDF.

== 2006 Lebanon War ==
- During the 2006 Lebanon War, Lebanese Shi'a Islamist militant group and political party Hezbollah fired some 4,000 rockets at Israel.

== After 2006 Lebanon War ==
United Nations Security Council Resolution 1701, adopted at the end of the 2006 Lebanon War, called for a full cessation of hostilities between Lebanon and Israel and for the Lebanese government to take full control of its territory, and it authorized the United Nations Interim Force in Lebanon (UNIFIL) "to ensure that its area of operations is not utilized for hostile activities of any kind". Nevertheless, since the war, there have been multiple rocket attacks on Israel from Lebanon. The Lebanese government has not claimed responsibility for any of the attacks, and has disavowed some of them.

As of 2023, there were an estimated 130,000 rockets in southern Lebanon near Israel's border, most under the control of Hezbollah.

=== June 17, 2007 ===
Two Katyusha rockets were fired from Lebanon at northern Israel, striking the town of Kiryat Shmona. The rockets caused some damage but no casualties.

Israeli Prime Minister Ehud Olmert called the incident "very disturbing". Russian ambassador to Lebanon Sergei Boukin voiced concern about the incident and said it was a violation of UN Resolution 1701.

Hezbollah denied responsibility. A previously unknown militant Islamic group calling itself "Jihadi Badr Brigades – Lebanon branch" claimed responsibility and vowed to continue attacks, saying: "We had promised our people jihad. Here, we again strike the Zionists when a group from the Jihadi Badr Brigades struck the Zionists in the occupied Palestinian territory."

=== January 8, 2009 ===
At least three Katyusha rockets were fired from southern Lebanon into the area of Nahariya in northern Israel. One of the rockets directly hit a nursing home for the elderly. At least two people were wounded, one suffering a broken leg, and others suffered from shock. A witness said that the second floor of the facility, where the residents sleep, sustained heavy damage, and that many lives were saved because they were in the dining hall at the time. Israel Police ordered residents of the city to remain close to fortified areas, and Shlomi Regional Council residents were told to open their bomb shelters; school in the area was cancelled. The incident took place during the Gaza War.

Israel responded by firing five artillery shells into Lebanon, which it said was a pinpoint response at the source of fire.

The Lebanese Office of the Prime Minister rejected the attack on Israel, saying: "Prime Minister Siniora regards what happened in the south as a violation of the international resolution 1701 and something he does not accept and Siniora called for an investigation into the incident". Hezbollah denied involvement, as did Hamas sources in Lebanon. An official from the Popular Front for the Liberation of Palestine-General Command did not deny responsibility for the attack, and stated: "Don't be surprised to see more rockets launched into northern Israel. It's a normal response to Israel's brutal aggression."

=== January 14, 2009 ===
In the second such attack in a week, rockets were fired from Lebanon into Israel, landing near the town of Kiryat Shmona. No injury or damage was reported. Residents fled to bomb shelters.

According to Haaretz, the attack and the previous one were carried out by Hezbollah through the proxy of the Popular Front for the Liberation of Palestine – General Command, a close Hezbollah ally.

United Nations Secretary-General Ban Ki-moon expressed alarm at the incident and urged restraint from all sides.

=== February 21, 2009 ===
Two rockets were fired from near the Lebanese coastal town of Naqoura into northern Israel, one striking a mostly Christian Arab Israeli village. At least one person was lightly injured.

Israel responded by firing some six artillery shells at the launch area, causing no injuries.

Lebanese Prime Minister Fuad Saniora said that the rockets "threatened security and stability" in the region and violated UN Resolution 1701. He also called Israel's retaliation "an unjustified violation of Lebanese sovereignty."

=== September 11, 2009 ===
Two Katyusha rockets were fired from Lebanon into northern Israel, one striking near Nahariya and another near Kibbutz Gesher Haziv. No damage or injury was reported. A witness said that the rockets had sparked panic, with residents entering bunkers and children being evacuated from schools. Israeli Prime Minister Benjamin Netanyahu said that the attack violated United Nations Security Council Resolution 1701 and that Israel would hold the Lebanese government accountable for it.

Israel responded by firing some 12 artillery shells at the launch area, near Qlayleh. No damage or injury was reported.

The United Nations condemned the attack on Israel and urged both sides "to exercise maximum restraint."

According to Lebanese commentators, the attack on Israel was connected to the country's political crisis exacerbated by Saad Hariri's inability to form a government. United Nations Interim Force in Lebanon (UNIFIL) spokesman Milos Strugar blamed radicals from Palestinian refugee camps in southern Lebanon for the attack.

UNIFIL had been warned of a possible attack 10 days before it occurred, and the UN body informed the Lebanese army two days before the attack.

=== October 27, 2009 ===
A Katyusha rocket was fired from Lebanese town of Hula into northern Israel, striking an open area east of Kiryat Shmona. The rocket caused a fire, but no serious damage or injury was reported. An Israeli military spokeswoman said Israel was treating the shooting "very seriously" and that it held the Lebanese government responsible.

Israel responded with artillery fire at Lebanon, causing no casualties, and lodged a complaint with the United Nations.

The Brigades of Abdullah Azzam, Battalions of Ziad Jarrah, a group linked to Al-Qaeda, claimed responsibility. In a statement, the group linked the attack to the 2009 Temple Mount riots: "The occupying Jews have dared to repeatedly raid the courtyard of Al-Aqsa ... In response to this aggression, a battalion among the Battalions of Ziad Jarrah" fired the Katyusha, the group said. Nevertheless, Lebanese President Michel Suleiman said that an "Israeli agent" was responsible for the attack.

The United States condemned the attack and, in a reference to Hezbollah, said it underscored the need to disarm all Lebanese groups.

UNIFIL launched an inquiry into the incident. The following day, the Lebanese military discovered four more rockets, ready to be fired, in the garden and on the balcony of a house belonging to the mayor of Hula.

The Lebanese Army later arrested Fadi Ibrahim of Ein el-Hilweh near Sidon for firing the rocket. Ibrahim was said to be a member of Fatah al-Islam, which is linked to al-Qaida. According to Lebanese daily A-Safir, Ibrahim and his followers were responsible for the subsequently discovered rockets as well.

=== November 29, 2011 ===
Shortly after midnight, four 122-millimeter rockets were fired at Israel from an area between Aita Shaab and Rumaysh in southern Lebanon. Two rockets landed near the Israeli localities of Biranit and Netu'a in the Western Galilee, some 700 meters from the Lebanese border. No injuries or damage were reported. Two additional rockets severely damaged a chicken coop and caused a propane gas tank to go up in flames. The Israel Defense Forces returned artillery fire at the launch site, causing no casualties.

The Abdullah Azzam Brigades, a group affiliated with al-Qaeda, reportedly claimed responsibility for the attack on Israel. Part of a statement attributed to the group read: "On Tuesday morning 29/11/2011 a unit from Abdullah Azzam Brigades shelled Zionist settlements in north Palestine from south Lebanon and the missiles have hit their targets. Victory is but from God." The group later denied this and implied that responsibility lay with Syria and Hezbollah. Hezbollah itself denied any connection to the attack.

United Nations Secretary-General Ban Ki-moon condemned the attack and called for "maximum restraint" from the parties concerned. The United States State Department also condemned the attack, calling it a "provocative act" that undermined Lebanon's stability and violated Resolution 1701.

=== December 11, 2011 ===
A rocket fired at Israel from the southern Lebanese village of Majdal Silim fell short and hit a home in Hula, Lebanon, injuring a Lebanese woman.

=== November 21, 2012 ===
Two rockets fired from Lebanon at Israel landed within Lebanon, according to Beirut officials.

The previous day, a Lebanese army patrol had discovered two ready-to-launch 107mm Grad rockets between the villages of Halta and Mari, about 2 miles (3.2 km) from the Israeli border. The forces defused the rockets. IDF official Brig. Gen. Yoav Mordechai said Palestinian factions in Lebanon were probably behind the plot.

On November 22, the Lebanese army disarmed an additional rocket aimed at Israel, in Marjayoun, about 10 kilometres (6.2 mi) from the border.

=== May 26, 2013 ===
A rocket was fired from south Lebanon towards Israel, but it was not clear where the rocket landed and there were no immediate reports of damage inside Israel.

=== August 22, 2013 ===
Four Katyusha rockets fired from southern Lebanon targeted northern Israel, setting off air-raid sirens in Acre, Nahariya and additional areas in the Western Galilee, causing no casualties but some damage. The Iron Dome defense system intercepted one of the rockets. The Abdallah Azzam Brigades claimed responsibility for the attack. The United States condemned the rocket fire and called it a violation of UN Security Council Resolution 1701. Israel retaliated by carrying out an airstrike on a target near Beirut.

=== July 11, 2014 ===
Three rockets were fired toward Israel. IDF retaliated by firing about 25 artillery shells on the area.

=== July 14, 2014 ===
Two Katyusha rockets launched from Lebanon against Israel's northern city of Nahariya landed in open territory. No injuries or damage were reported. IDF artillery responded by targeting the launch site in Lebanon.

=== August 24, 2014 ===
A rocket fired from Lebanon hit a building in an open area in the Upper Galilee. Two children were lightly injured by shrapnel and four people were suffering from shock as a result of the attack.

=== August 25, 2014 ===
Two rockets were fired into Israel by Lebanese militants, prompting rocket sirens in towns along the border, including Kiryat Shmona and Metula. IDF responded with artillery fire.

=== December 20, 2015 ===
Three rockets were fired into northwestern Israel. Sirens sounded in the area of Nahariya and Shlomi. No injuries were reported. The IDF responded with artillery fire. The attack came half a day after the killing of Samir Kuntar in Syria by the Israeli Air Force.

=== May 13, 2021 ===
Amidst the background of the 2021 Israel–Palestine crisis, three rockets were launched from the Qlaileh area towards northern Israel. The IDF stated that the rockets landed in the Mediterranean Sea, causing no damage or casualties, and witnesses in the Israeli city of Haifa reported hearing the three explosions from the rockets impacting the sea.

=== May 17, 2021 ===
For a second time during the 2021 Israel–Palestine crisis, rockets were fired from southern Lebanon towards northern Israel. According to the United Nations Interim Force in Lebanon, 6 rockets were fired from the Rachaya Al Foukhar area, triggering Red Alert sirens in the northern Israeli kibbutz of Misgav Am. The IDF responded to the rocket fire by firing around 22 artillery shells towards the source of the rocket fire.

=== May 19, 2021 ===
Once again during the 2021 Israel–Palestine crisis, four rockets were fired from southern Lebanon towards northern Israel, triggering Red Alerts in Haifa. One rocket was intercepted by Iron Dome, while another landed in an open area and two landed in the Mediterranean Sea. The IDF retaliated with artillery fire at the source of the rocket fire.

=== July 20, 2021 ===
In the early morning of July 20, two rockets were fired from southern Lebanon towards Israel. One rocket was intercepted by Iron Dome, while the other landed in an open area. The IDF retaliated by firing artillery shells at the source of the rocket fire.

=== August 4, 2021 ===
Just after noon on August 4, three rockets were fired from southern Lebanon towards Israel. Two rockets landed in Kiryat Shmona, while a third fell short in Lebanon. The IDF retaliated by firing dozens of artillery shells towards the source of the rocket fire and subsequently with airstrikes.

=== August 6, 2021 ===
On August 6, Hezbollah fired a barrage of some 20 rockets into the Israeli-occupied Golan Heights in response to a previous Israeli airstrike inside Lebanon. The Iron Dome missile defense system intercepted ten of the rockets, while six fell in open areas near Shebaa Farms on the Lebanese border. The others fell inside Lebanon. There were no casualties or damage. Israeli artillery responded toward the area in Lebanon where the rocket fire originated from.

=== April 25, 2022 ===
Just after midnight on April 25, one rocket was fired from southern Lebanon into Israel. The rocket landed in an open area near Shlomi, without triggering a Red Alert. The IDF retaliated by firing artillery shells toward the source of the rocket fire.

=== April 6, 2023 ===
In the early afternoon of April 6, 34 rockets were fired from southern Lebanon into Israel in the largest rocket attack since the 2006 Lebanon War. At least 25 of the rockets were intercepted, while at least five impacted directly, injuring three people.

In the evening, two rockets were fired toward Metula without triggering a Red Alert; no damage was caused.

The next morning, in response to the rocket fire, Israel conducted airstrikes in Tyre, Lebanon.

=== July 6, 2023 ===
Two anti-tank guided missiles were fired from southern Lebanon toward Ghajar. It was later reported in Israeli media that the missiles were fired at IDF vehicles patrolling near the village.

== During the Gaza war ==
=== October 8, 2023 ===
Amid the Gaza war, several mortars and anti-tank guided missiles were fired by Hezbollah at IDF installations near Shebaa Farms. The IDF responded with counterbattery fire and an airstrike that destroyed a tent Hezbollah erected in Israeli-occupied territory several months prior.

=== October 9, 2023 ===
Again amid the Gaza war, two mortars were fired toward Israel from Lebanon. One landed short in Lebanon while another struck an open area in Israel. In response to this and a simultaneous infiltration by gunmen that left three IDF personnel dead, the IDF conducted counterbattery fire and struck Hezbollah observation posts in the area.

=== October 10, 2023 ===
In the late afternoon, a barrage of approximately 15 rockets were fired toward Israel from areas in southern Lebanon. Iron Dome intercepted four, while the rest landed in open areas. The IDF responded with counterbattery fire.

=== October 11, 2023 ===
In the early morning, Hezbollah launched multiple anti-tank guided missiles at an IDF post near the border. Hezbollah claimed the attack caused "a large number" of casualties, while the IDF did not comment on casualty figures. In response to the attack, the IDF conducted counterbattery fire and a drone strike that destroyed a Hezbollah border post.

=== October 14, 2023 ===
In the early afternoon, Hezbollah fired approximately 30 mortars and multiple anti-tank guided missiles toward IDF positions near Shebaa Farms. The IDF responded with counterbattery fire, airstrikes on Hezbollah targets in the area, and a drone strike that killed a group of militants near the border in Lebanon.

=== October 15, 2023 ===
Over the course of the day, Hezbollah fired at least 6 anti-tank guided missiles toward IDF positions and the Israeli town of Shtula. A construction site was struck, killing one and injuring three. The IDF conducted counterbattery fire and airstrikes in response, while ground troops clashed with militants near the border fence.

Also during the day, around 9 rockets were fired toward the Israeli town of Nahariya from southern Lebanon. Hamas claimed responsibility for the attack, and there was no damage.

=== October 16, 2023 ===
Hezbollah fired an anti-tank guided missile at an IDF tank near the border, striking it. The IDF retaliated with artillery fire in the area of the attack.

=== October 17, 2023 ===
In the early morning, Hezbollah fired an anti-tank guided missile at the town of Metula, injuring two soldiers and one civilian. The IDF responded with tank fire toward the launch site.

Later in the day, two rockets were fired from Lebanon toward Kiryat Shmona. One was intercepted by Iron Dome while a second landed in a field; there were no injuries. The IDF responded by conducting airstrikes against Hezbollah observation posts in the area.

=== October 18, 2023 ===
In the early morning, Hezbollah fired an anti-tank guided missile toward IDF forces near Shtula. The IDF responded with artillery fire.

In the evening, Hezbollah fired several anti-tank guided missiles at targets near Ma'ayan Baruch, Rosh HaNikra and Shtula. About an hour later, this was followed by more anti-tank guided missile fire near Metula, mortar fire toward Shebaa Farms, and the launch of 9 rockets toward Kiryat Shmona. Of the rockets, four were intercepted by Iron Dome, one impacted in the city, and the rest fell in open areas; one civilian was injured. The IDF responded to these attacks with tank fire, counterbattery fire, airstrikes on Hezbollah targets in southern Lebanon, and strikes against mortar launching teams.

=== October 19, 2023 ===
Around noon, Hezbollah fired two anti-tank guided missiles toward Manara. The IDF responded with counterbattery fire.

A few hours later, multiple barrages totalling 30 rockets were fired toward Nahariya, Shlomi and Kiryat Shmona. Hamas claimed responsibility for the attack, and while most rockets fell in open areas or were intercepted by Iron Dome, an impact in Kiryat Shmona injured 3. The IDF blamed Hezbollah, and responded with airstrikes against Hezbollah targets in southern Lebanon.

=== October 20, 2023 ===
In the afternoon, following numerous attacks with gunfire against IDF border posts earlier in the day, several anti-tank guided missiles were fired at IDF posts along the border. The IDF responded with artillery fire and targeted four anti-tank guided missile teams with drone strikes. A short while later, 2 rockets were fired at Metula; there was no damage.

A few hours later, more anti-tank guided missiles were launched toward IDF troops near Netu'a; one IDF soldier was killed. The IDF responded with airstrikes against Hezbollah sites in southern Lebanon.

=== October 21, 2023 ===
In the early afternoon, a number of rockets were fired from Lebanon toward the Israeli-occupied Shebaa Farms; there were no injuries. The IDF conducted a drone strike on the team of militants that launched the rockets.

A short while later, anti-tank guided missiles were fired from Lebanon toward Margaliot and Hanita; two foreign workers were injured in the attacks. The IDF conducted airstrikes against the missile teams.

In the evening, another anti-tank guided missile was fired from Lebanon toward Bar'am. One IDF soldier was seriously injured and two others lightly injured in the attack. The IDF responded with several airstrikes in southern Lebanon, some of which targeted other missile teams preparing attacks.

=== October 22, 2023 ===
In the late morning, an anti-tank guided missile was fired from Lebanon toward the Israeli-occupied Shebaa Farms. The IDF responded with tank fire and killed the missile team.

In the early afternoon, several mortars were fired toward Yiftah; no damage or casualties were reported. In the evening, an anti-tank guided missile was fired toward Arab al-Aramshe; the IDF responded with continued airstrikes against missile launching teams. Seven teams in total were struck over the course of the day.

=== October 23, 2023 ===
After a day of IDF strikes against Hezbollah missile teams, in the evening an anti-tank guided missile was fired toward Kiryat Shmona. Two were injured, and a house was damaged. The IDF responded with continued airstrikes against missile and rocket teams, along with strikes against Hezbollah border posts.

=== October 24, 2023 ===
In the afternoon, an anti-tank guided missile was launched at Manara. The IDF responded by attacking the source of the fire and striking a missile team near Shebaa Farms.

A short while later, several mortars were fired toward Elkosh and Netu'a. The IDF responded with airstrikes on the militants launching the mortars.

=== October 25, 2023 ===
In the afternoon, an anti-tank guided missile was launched at an IDF tank near Avivim. The IDF responded by attacking the source of the fire.

A few hours later, four rockets were fired toward Kiryat Shmona; all landed in open areas. The IDF responded with continued strikes against militant teams operating near the border.

=== October 27, 2023 ===
In the afternoon, Hezbollah carried out several anti-tank guided missile attacks against IDF forces operating near Avivim and Misgav Am. The IDF responded with airstrikes and artillery shelling against the source of the fire.

=== October 28, 2023 ===
In the afternoon, several rockets were fired at Misgav Am and Margaliot while anti-tank guided missiles were fired at border communities. A few hours later, more rockets were fired at Zar'it and Shtula; the IDF responded with artillery fire and airstrikes.

== See also ==
- History of the Israel Defense Forces
- Israeli-Lebanese conflict
- Palestinian rocket attacks on Israel
- Civil defense in Israel
- Israeli casualties of war
- Timeline of the Arab–Israeli conflict
