= Tel Rosh =

Archaeological site in northern Israel

- Khirbet Tell ‘er-Ruwesah
- Shown in Israel
- 33°02′28.6″N 35°19′57.9″E
- Type: Tell
- Location: Israel
- Region: Upper Galilee, Israel
- Grid position: 181/271 PAL

Site notes
- Excavation dates: 2017, 2018

Tel Rosh (Hebrew: תל ראש, "mound of the head"), also known in Arabic as Khirbet Tell ‘er-Ruwesah is an archaeological site located in the Upper Galilee in northern Israel, about 1 km SE of Fassuta, and north of the modern moshav of Elkosh.

== Site ==
The site is an artificial mound, known as a "Tell", with an area of 25 dunams (6.2 acres), located on top of a hill The excavation has revealed that in some period, the settlement at the site has extended to the slopes of the mound. The site is located between the western highlands of the Galilee, characterized by moderate plateaus sloping towards the Mediterranean coast in the east, and the ridge of Mount Meron to the east. The areas to the west are suitable for agriculture. A water source is available at the Elkosh Spring, some 500 meters south of the site. The site is located next to the ancient road which connects the city of Acre with Tebnine. These features have allowed the site to become a significant settlement throughout its long history.

== History ==
Surveys at the site have shown that it was inhabited throughout almost every archaeological and historical period from the Early Bronze Age to the Ottoman Period, spanning roughly 5,000 years. During the Iron Age II period contemporary with the Kingdom of Israel and Phoenicia, it was a regional center. The site was identified with "Beit-Shemesh", mentioned in the Hebrew Bible as a town in the territory of the Tribe of Naphtali (not to be confused with Beit-Shemesh in Judea). A minor excavation was conducted at the site by Israeli archaeologists and a new study has suggested identifying the site with another settlement known in the biblical texts as "Rehob", in the territory of the Tribe of Asher.

In the Crusader era it was known as Roeis, and in 1183 it was noted that Godfrey de Tor sold the land of the village to Joscelin III. In 1220 Jocelyn III's daughter Beatrix de Courtenay and her husband Otto von Botenlauben, Count of Henneberg, sold their land, including Roeis and the nearby Cassie (Dayr al-Qassi), to the Teutonic Knights.

== Research ==
The site was explored in the late 19th century by European researchers Victor Guérin and by Conder and Kitchener of the Palestine Exploration Fund. The site, which had no proper access, remained overlooked until Israeli archaeologists Ruth Amiran and Yohanan Aharoni surveyed the site between 1948 and 1953, thanks to new roads that were paved. The region was believed to have been sparsely populated because of the harsh terrain and the lack of ancient sources, but the surveys of Amiram and Aharoni have revealed the long occupation record of the site and its archaeological potential. An excavation was planned by Amiram in 1952 but it was never conducted. The site was excavated in 2017 and 2018 by the Kinneret College in collaboration with the Open University of Israel. Four areas were studied, two on the peak of the mound and two in its slopes. The excavation yielded assemblages of pottery from many different periods, remains of architecture, agricultural tools, and more.

Hayah Katz, who headed the excavation, and Yigal Levin, have written in an article that Tel Rosh is the most likely candidate for "Rehob", mentioned in the Book of Joshua 19:28, between Ebron, Hammon and Kanah.

== See also ==
- Kedesh

== Bibliography ==
- Hayah Katz & Yigal Levin (2020). "Tel Rosh: The forgotten Rehob in the Upper Galilee". Palestine Exploration Quarterly. 153: 24–41. doi:10.1080/00310328.2020.1751490. S2CID 225601528 – via Taylor & Francis.
- Röhricht, R. (1893). (RRH) Regesta regni Hierosolymitani (MXCVII-MCCXCI) (in Latin). Berlin: Libraria Academica Wageriana.
- Strehlke, E., ed. (1869). Tabulae Ordinis Theutonici ex tabularii regii Berolinensis codice potissimum. Berlin: Weidmanns.
