= Civil defense in Israel =

Protection from human and natural disasters

Civil defense in Israel deals with a variety of military and terrorist threats to the civilian population, which have included concealed bombs such as suicide bombings and car bombs, projectiles such as missiles, rockets and mortar shells, and hijacking of aircraft, buses and buildings. Threats have originated in all countries and territories bordering Israel (the West Bank, the Gaza Strip, Lebanon, Syria, Jordan and Egypt), as well as Iraq, and an Israeli civil airliner was attacked with missiles in Kenya. Perceived threats that have not materialized to date include sustained interruption of the economy, nuclear attack from Iran, and chemical or biological attack from Iraq or elsewhere.

== Institutions and legal frameworks ==
=== 1951 civil defense law ===
The 1951 civil defense law, revised several times since then, legislates matters pertaining to civil defense. The law mandates the construction and upkeep of shelters in all homes, residential and industrial buildings. The law also establishes the civil defense service, allows the state to make use of private equipment and human power for emergency situations, defines a civil state of alert and lays down rules regarding the use of hazardous materials.

=== Home Front Command ===
The Israeli Home Front Command was created in February 1992 following the Gulf War. Until the establishment of the Command, responsibility for the home front fell under the Civilian Defense’s Chief Officer Corps Command and under Regional Defense. During that time, the three regional commands had their own home front commands. After the first Persian Gulf War, these organizations were unified and the Home Front Command was created. Ever since its creation, there have been great efforts undertaken to turn the Home Front Command into a civilian body, but thus far, all of these have failed. As of 2008–2011, it was headed by Aluf Yair Golan.

=== National Emergency Authority ===
The National Emergency Authority (Reshut Heyrum Le'umit or "Rachel" for short) was created in September 2007 and charged with coordinating military and civilian action during a state of emergency, war or natural disaster.

Between 6–10 April 2008, the National Emergency Authority conducted the largest emergency exercise in the country's history.

=== Emergency Economy ===
The Emergency Economy (meshek l'sheat heyrum or "Melah" for short) is a body whose function is to assure continued activity of vital enterprises during an emergency. An Emergency Economy order allows the recruitment of workers for essential private and public services, such as emergency services, medicine, local authorities, food and equipment supply, communications, etc.

On 27 December 2008, at the start of the 2008-2009 Israel-Gaza conflict, Industry, Trade and Labor Minister Eli Yishai signed an EE order applying to the local authorities in the vicinity of the Gaza Strip, Sderot, Netivot and Ashkelon.

=== Special situation on the home front ===
The special situation on the home front (SSHF) is a legal mechanism allowing the Defense Ministry, through the Home Front Command, to issue binding regulations for the civilian population in the specified area. The decision is valid for 48 hours, and must then be ratified by the government. On 20 May 2007 Defense Minister Amir Peretz declared an SSHF in areas of southern Israel struck by rocket attacks from Gaza. The situation was lifted in August, but shortly afterward, On 4 September, Defense minister Ehud Barak declared an SSHF in Gaza vicinity communities for 48 hours following the resurgence of heavy rocket fire from Gaza.

=== ZAKA body recovery teams ===
ZAKA (Hebrew: זק"א, an acronym for Zihuy Korbanot Ason, literally: "Disaster Victim Identification"), is a series of voluntary community emergency response teams in Israel, each operating in a police district (two in the Central District due to geographic considerations). These organizations are officially recognized by the government. The full name is ZAKA - Identification and Rescue - True Kindness (Hebrew: זק"א - איתור חילוץ והצלה - חסד של אמת).

ZAKA activity expanded rapidly during the al-Aqsa Intifada (from September 2000), when frequent terrorist suicide bombings created many scenes of disaster, with the remains and body parts of many victims strewn around bombing sites.

== Shelters ==
=== Bomb shelters ===
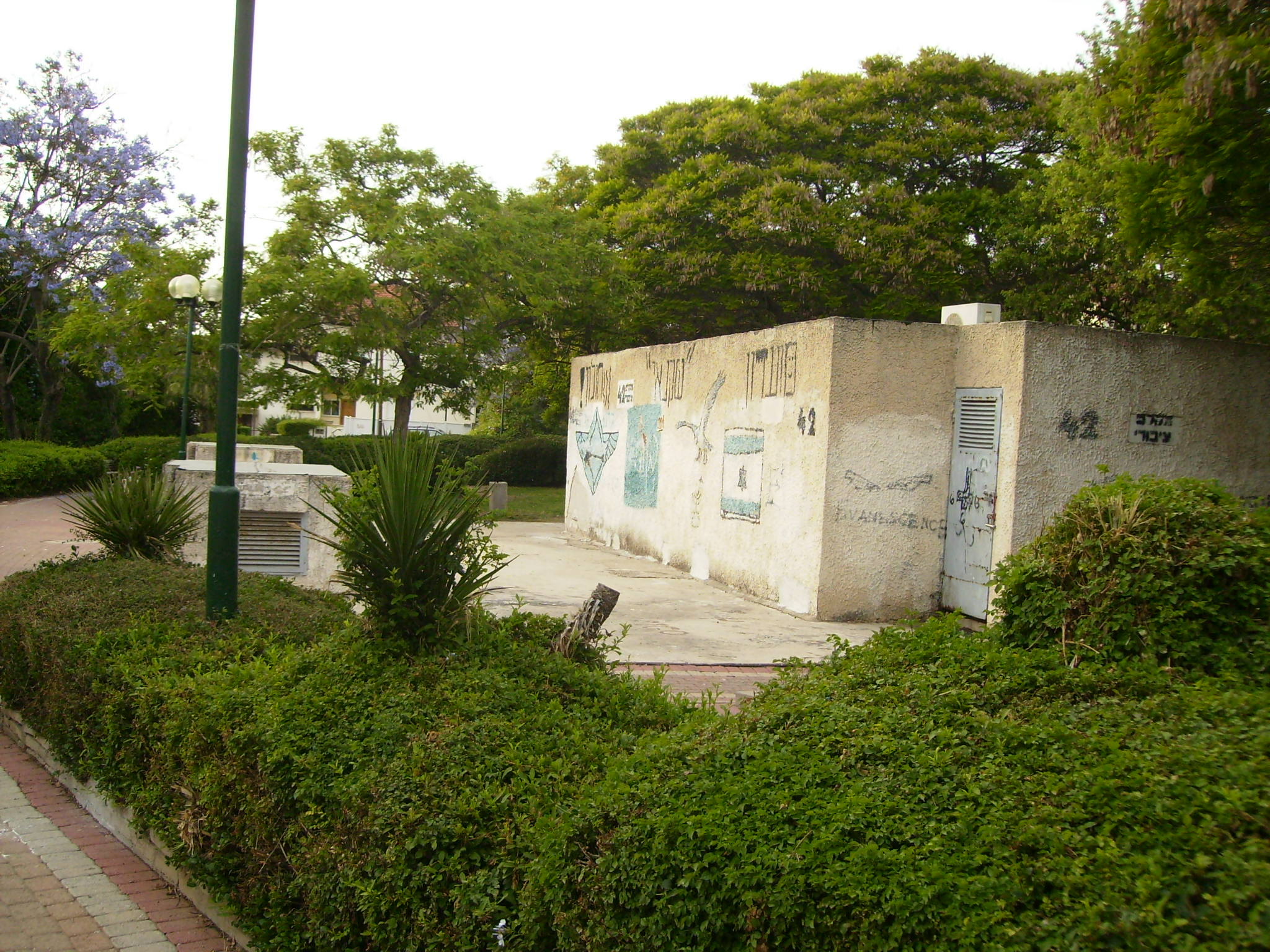
The entrance to an underground bomb shelter, such as this one in Holon, is a common sight in Israel

According to the 1951 civil defense law, all homes, residential buildings and industrial buildings in Israel are required to have bomb shelters. However, several homes or residential buildings may make use of a single shelter jointly.

Prior to the 1982 Lebanon War, PLO attacks from Lebanon led to thousands of Israelis spending large amounts of time in bomb shelters.

In October 2010, the Home Front Command initiated a publicity campaign to explain to the public what the specified time people have to enter public bomb shelters after hearing the warning siren.

=== Protected spaces ===
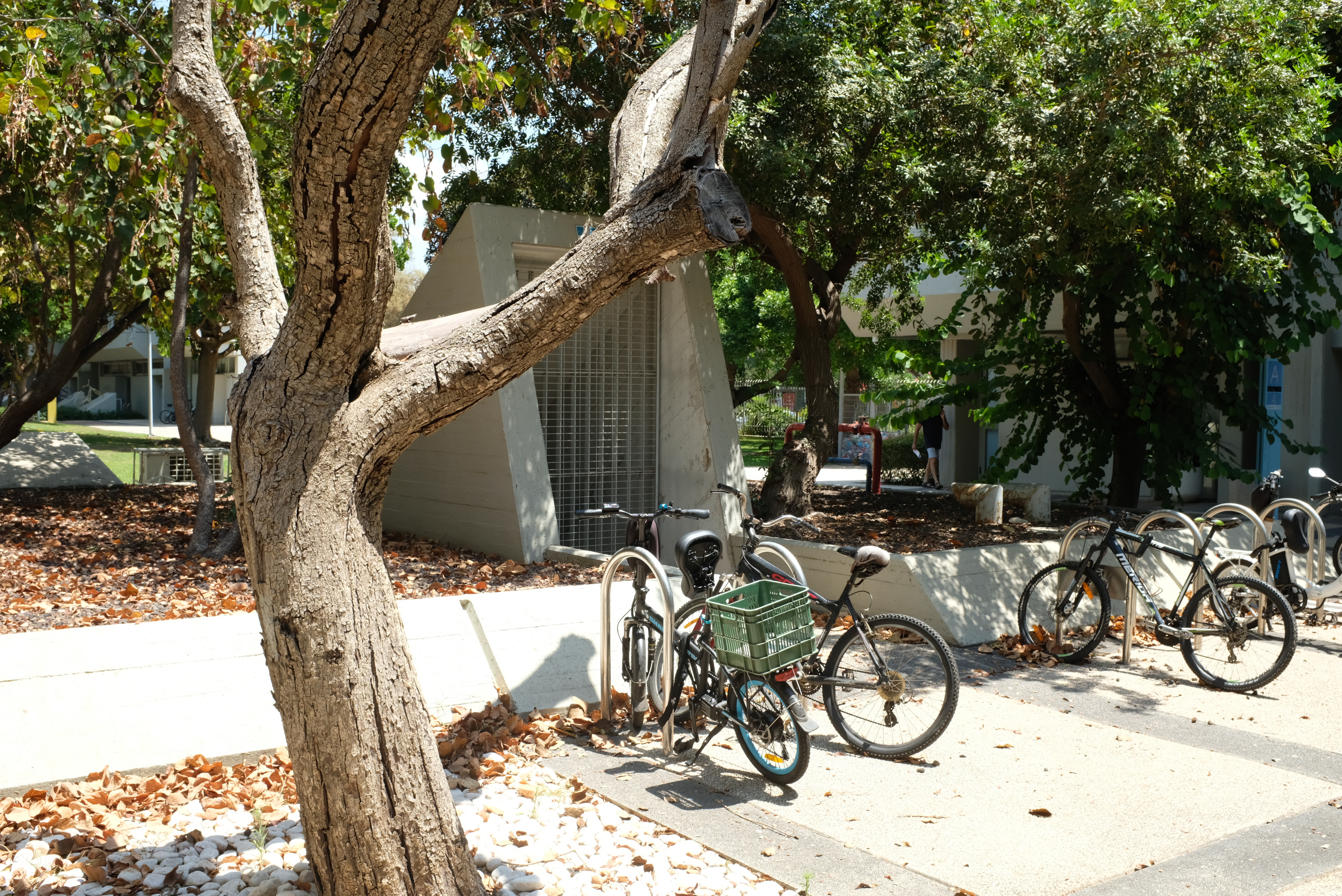
Aboveground entrance to a subterranean bomb shelter at the Einstein Dormitories, Tel Aviv University

The "protected space" is a similar concept to the shelter but serves individual apartment units, building floors, or other public areas. It consists of a reinforced concrete room with access from the building's individual apartment. The idea of the protected space followed the First Gulf War, when the warning time for incoming missiles was shortened and there was a need for fast access to shelter. The move from subterranean bomb shelters to more elevated protected spaces was motivated by the possibility of the use of chemical weapons by neighbouring countries. In Hebrew, merhav mugan dirati is shortened to its acronym MaMa"D, though protected spaces which are shared by an entire residential or office floor are called a MaMa"K, short for merhav mugan komati.

=== Fortifications ===
Communities near the Gaza Strip, which have been targeted by constant rocket attacks since 2001, have additional fortifications. In March 2008 the government placed 120 fortified bus stops in Sderot, following a Defense Ministry assessment that most rocket-related injuries and fatalities were caused by shrapnel wounds in victims on the street. As of January 2009, all schools in Sderot have been fortified against rockets; fortifications consist of arched canopies over roofs. However, on 3 January 2009 a Grad rocket penetrated the fortification of a school in Ashkelon.

In March 2009, Sderot inaugurated a reinforced children's recreation center built by the Jewish National Fund. The purpose of the center, which has "$1.5 million worth of reinforced steel", is to provide a rocket-proof place for children to play. Sderot also has a "missile-protected playground", with concrete tunnels painted to look like caterpillars.

== Non-permanent fortification facilities ==
=== Bell-shaped migunit ===
A concrete facility with a bell-like form, with space for a small number of people, that can be placed in open fields or near roads.

=== Box-shaped migunit ===
A concrete facility with a box-like shape, set up using a crane, which can contain 10+ people.

=== Sewer pipes ===
Several meter sewer pipes are put near houses.

== Warning systems ==
=== Warning sirens ===
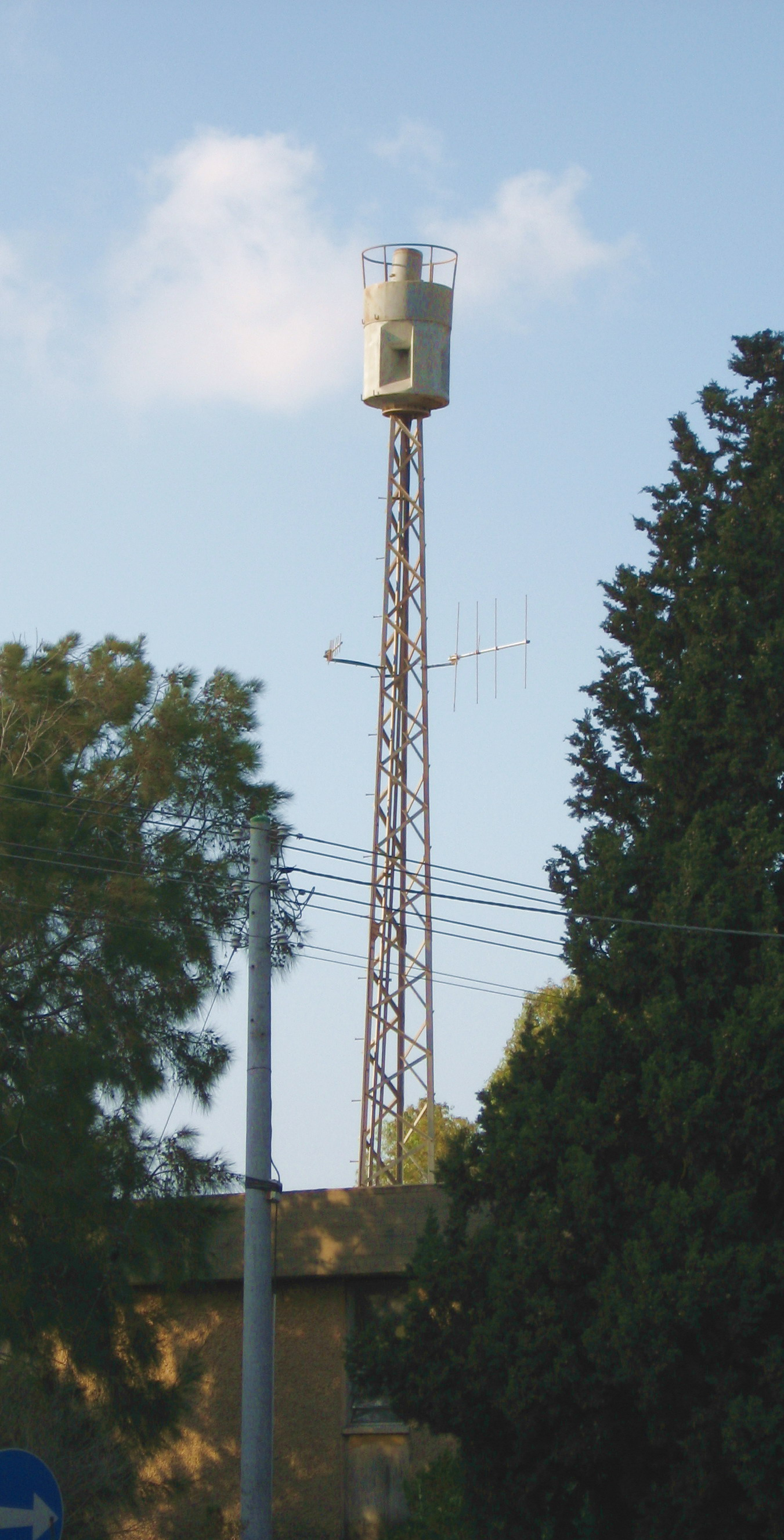
A typical air-raid siren in Haifa, Israel. Sirens have been used for air raids and missile attacks in previous conflicts.

Air raid sirens used are typically sounded to warn of air raids or missile attacks on civilian population. Most of the sirens in urban areas are German-made HLS (supercharged) sirens, model F71. The Air Raid Sirens are called אזעקה ("Az'aka", literally "alarm"), and consist of a continuous, ascending and descending tone. The "all-clear" signal (called צפירת הרגעה, "Tzfirat Harga'ah") is a continuous single-pitch sound. However, in recent conflicts use of the "all-clear" signal has been discontinued, as it was seen as causing needless confusion and alarm.

==== Ceremonial use of sirens ====
Sirens also double for ceremonial use. The "all-clear" signal is used three times yearly to denote a minute's silence, once on Israel's Holocaust Remembrance Day and twice on Day of Remembrance.

=== Red Color ===
The Red Color (Hebrew: צבע אדום, transl.: Tzeva Adom) is an early warning radar system installed by the Israel Defense Forces in several towns surrounding the Gaza Strip to warn civilians of imminent attack by rockets (usually Qassam rockets). The system was installed in Ashkelon between July 2005 and April 2006.

== Guards ==
=== Civil aircraft ===
Israel's national air carrier, El Al, is widely regarded as the safest airline in the world, and no flight leaving Israel's Ben Gurion International Airport has ever been hijacked. One exceptional method used in Israeli airport security is that security agents personally converse with each passenger, looking for clues that the person is a terrorist or is being unwittingly used by terrorists. Other measures include reinforced cockpit doors and an air marshal on every flight.

=== Public transportation ===
The Magen Unit was established in 2001 with the task of protecting Israeli public transportation from suicide bombers. The unit consisted of some 800 security guards, all post-army with combat certification - and in some areas, including downtown Jerusalem, the unit also utilized K-9 squads with specially-trained bomb-sniffing dogs. The unit's presence became more public in the years of the Second Intifada, in which 267 people were killed in 41 terror attacks targeting public transportation. Magen was disbanded in late 2007 following a cabinet decision in August of that year.

=== Public and communal buildings ===
The entrances of most shopping malls, stores, restaurants and other public buildings in Israel have guards, and often metal detectors. While such security keeps bombers out, it also creates lines of people who sometimes become targets.

== Chemical warfare defenses ==
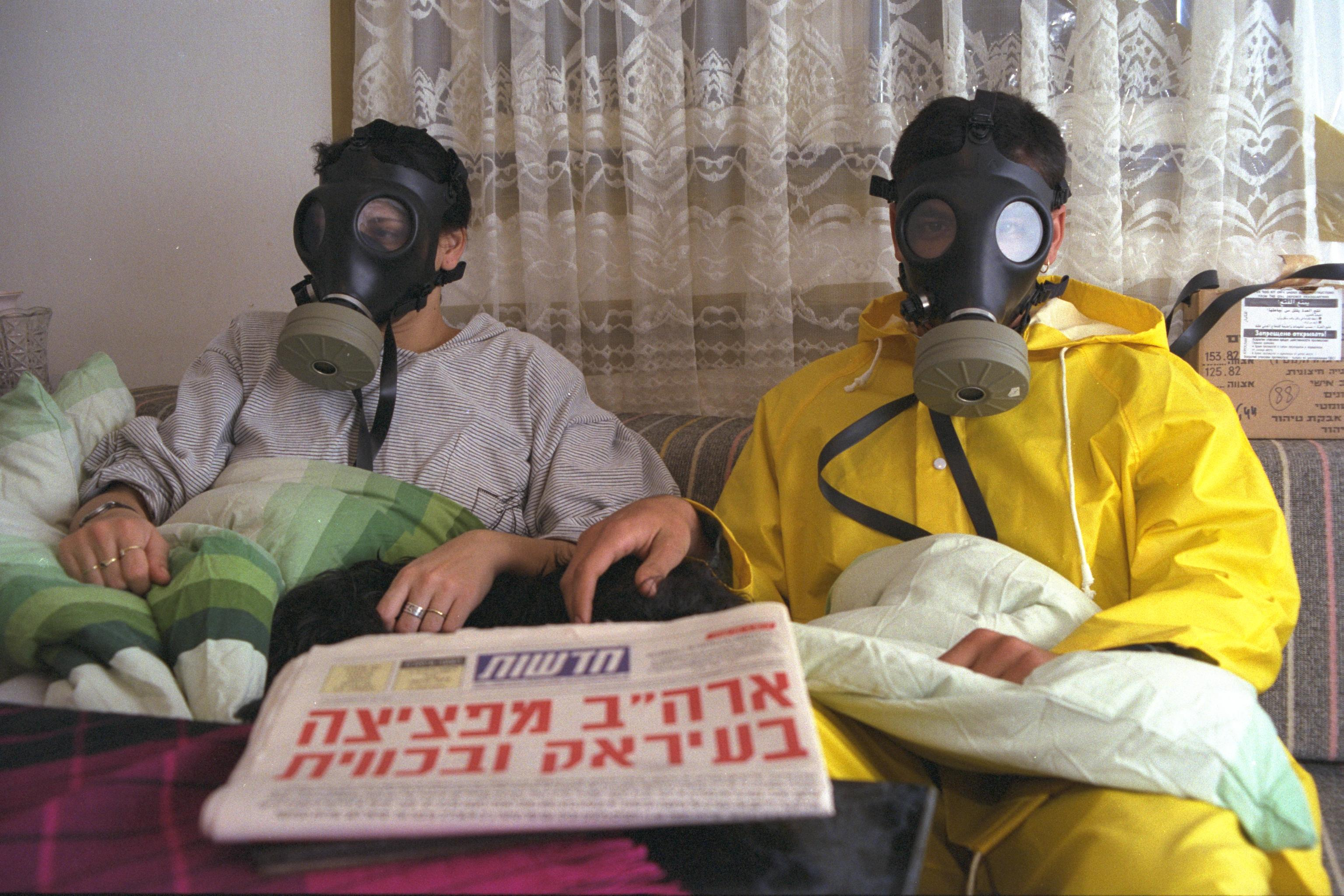
An Israeli family in its sealed room, with gas masks, during the 1991 Gulf War

During the 1991 Gulf War, Israel feared that Iraq would attack the country with missiles carrying chemical weapons and prepared accordingly. Four million gas masks were distributed to citizens across the country, as well as to residents of the West Bank and the Gaza Strip, and chemical-proof sealed rooms were prepared in homes. No chemical weapons were actually launched by Iraq, but Iraq did fire 39 conventional Scud missiles on Israel during the course of the war, hitting neighborhoods around Tel Aviv and elsewhere and causing extensive property damage. As soon as the first missile fell, Israel declared a chemical-weapons civil defense alert. Upon missile attacks, air-raid sirens sounded nationwide and civil defense authorities instructed the public, via radio, to don gas masks and close themselves in sealed rooms.

In early 1998, during an escalation in the Iraq disarmament crisis, a media-stirred panic of Iraqi chemical attack ensued in Israel, with thousands lining up at gas mask distribution centers. Officials downplayed the dangers but began preparations nonetheless.

Prior to the 2003 Invasion of Iraq, Israel instructed its citizens to ready their sealed rooms again and to carry gas masks at all times, though it assessed the likelihood of chemical attack as low.

== Missile interception systems ==
The increasing danger of rocket and missile fire against the State of Israel (namely, Qassam rocket fire from Gaza, Katyusha rocket fire from South Lebanon, and Iran's ballistic missile arsenal) has led to the development of defense systems to counter this threat. In addition to the Iron Dome system, which is designed to intercept short range rockets, the David's Sling system has also been developed in order to intercept medium and long range rockets, while the Arrow missile, designed to intercept ballistic missiles, is already in use.

=== Arrow missile ===
The Arrow "Interceptor" (Hebrew: טיל חץ [ˈtil ˈxɛts]) ABM is a theater missile defense (TMD) system; it is the first missile developed by Israel and United States that was specifically designed and built to intercept and destroy ballistic missiles on a national level.

On July 29, 2004, Israel and the United States carried out a joint test flight in the USA in which the Arrow was launched against a real Scud missile. The test was a success, with the Arrow destroying the Scud with a direct hit. In December 2005 the system was successfully tested again in a firing against a replicated Scud C as Shahab-3 missile. This test success was repeated on February 11, 2007.

=== David's Sling ===
David's Sling (Hebrew: קלע דוד), also sometimes called Magic Wand (Hebrew: שרביט קסמים), is an Israel Defense Forces military system being jointly developed by the Israeli defense contractor Rafael Advanced Defense Systems Ltd. and the American defense contractor Raytheon, designed to intercept medium- to long-range rockets.

=== Iron Dome ===
Iron Dome (Hebrew: כיפת ברזל) is a mobile system developed by Rafael Advanced Defense Systems Ltd. designed to intercept short-range rockets with a range less than 70 km.

Rafael states that the system is an effective solution to short range rockets (such as Qassam rockets) and 155mm shells, capable of operating both during the day and at night, under various weather conditions, and able to confront multiple simultaneous threats. It was proved to be about 80% successful in downing rockets during the 2012 Gaza war.

== See also ==
- Civil defense by nation
  - United States civil defense
- Civil Guard (Israel)
- Lebanese rocket attacks on Israel
- Palestinian rocket attacks on Israel
