= Al-Mansura, Acre =

Al-Mansura المنصورة
- Village
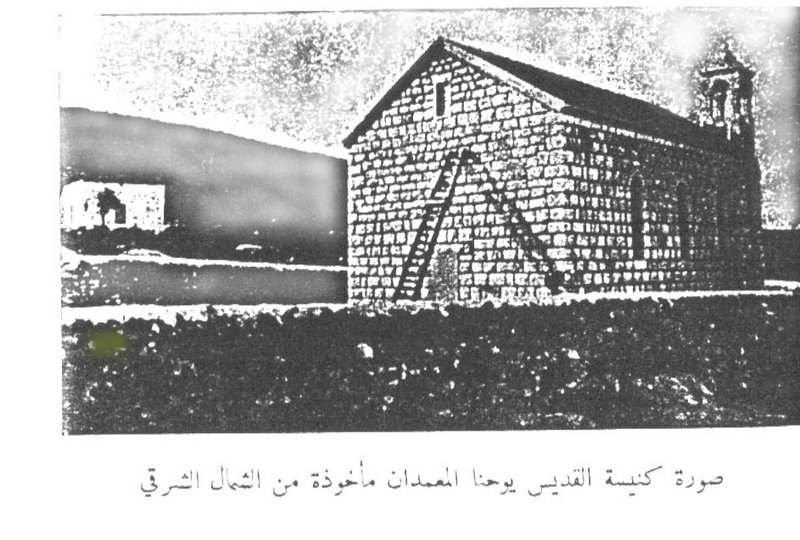
- Maronite Church of Yohanna
- Etymology: Khirbet Mansura= The ruin of Mansura
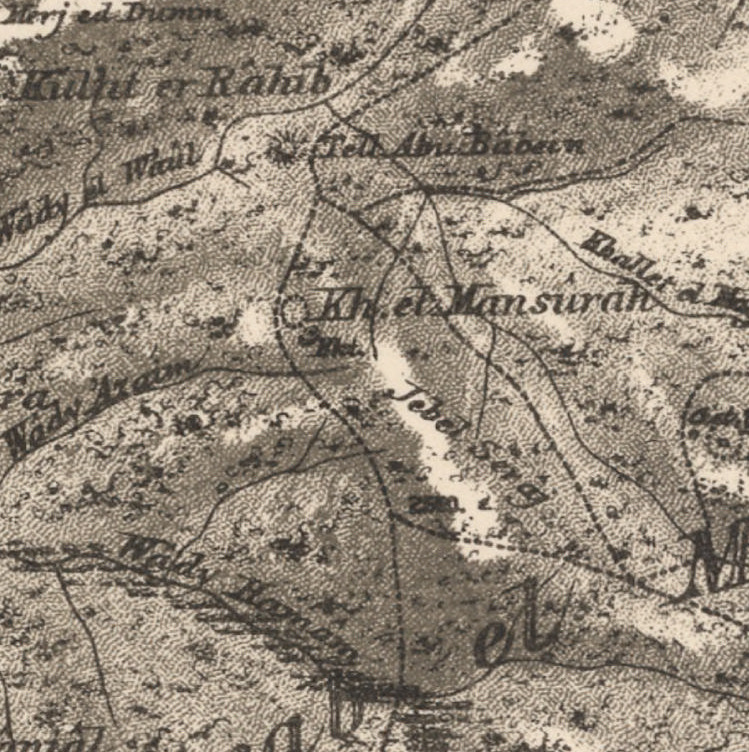
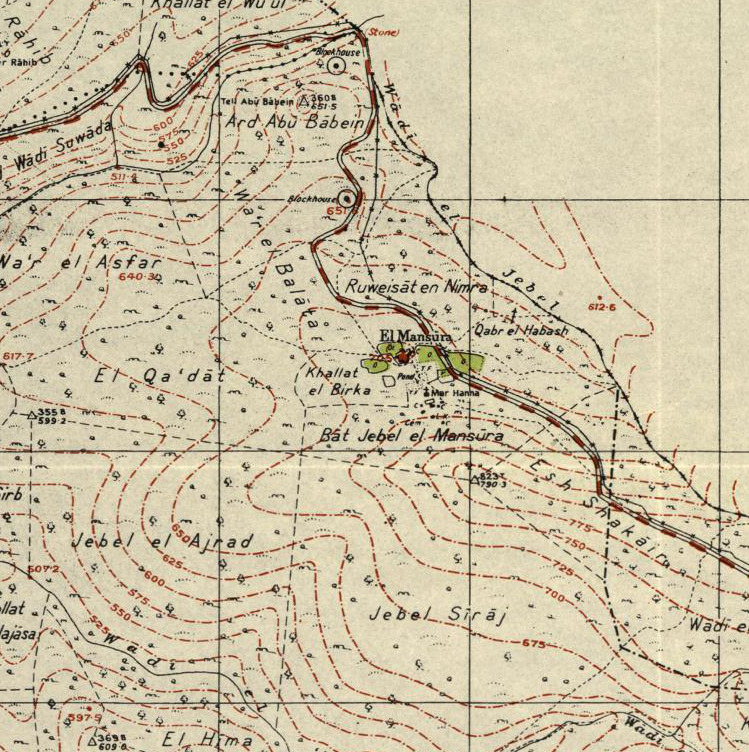
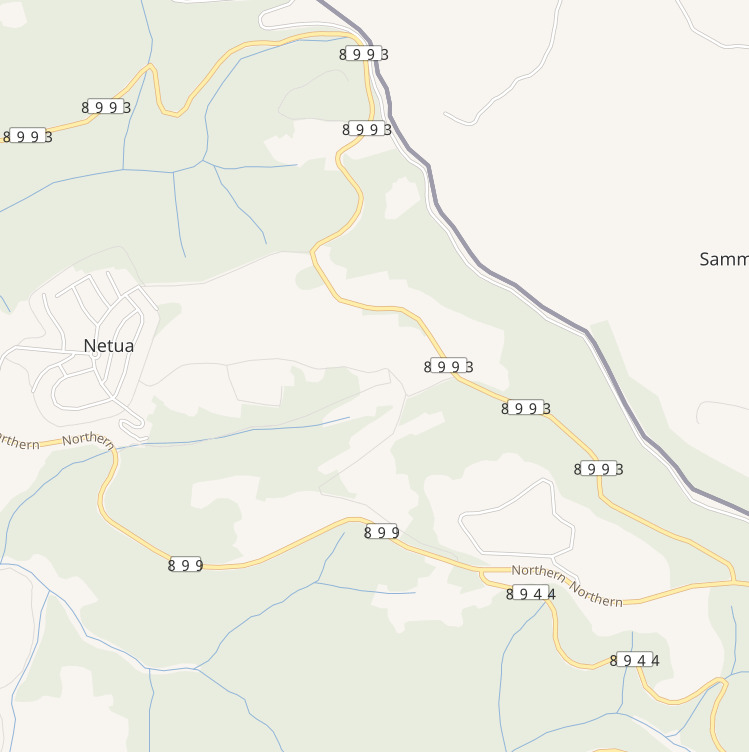
- 1870s map 1940s map modern map A series of historical maps of the area around Al-Mansura, Acre (click the buttons)

- Location within Mandatory Palestine
- Coordinates: 33°03′50″N 35°20′05″E
- Palestine grid: 182/274
- Geopolitical entity: Mandatory Palestine
- Subdistrict: Acre
- Date of depopulation: Early November 1948

Population (1945)
  - Total: 2,300 (with nearby Fassuta and Dayr al-Qassi)
- Cause(s) of depopulation: Expulsion by Yishuv forces
- Current Localities: Netu'a, Mattat, Abirim, Elkosh and Biranit

Al-Mansura (Arabic: المنصورة) was a Palestinian village that was depopulated by the Israeli army during the 1948 Arab-Israeli war. In 1945, it had a population of 2,300 together with the neighboring villages of Dayr al-Qassi (also depopulated) and Fassuta. The population was predominantly Christian and most its residents live in what is now the state of Israel.

It was situated on the northern end of a mountain in the Upper Galilee whose summit was behind the village to the south. It was connected to the coastal Acre-Ras al-Naqoura highway via a secondary road.

== History ==
The village was incorporated into the Ottoman Empire in 1517; in 1596 it appeared under the name of al-Mansura in the tax registers as part of the nahiya (subdistrict) of Jira in the Sanjak (district) of Safed. It had an all Muslim population, consisting of 17 households and 5 bachelors. They paid a fixed tax-rate of 25% on agricultural products, including wheat, barley, olive trees, goats and beehives, in addition to occasional revenues and an olive oil press; the taxes totalled 3,656 akçe. All of the taxes went to a Waqf.

In 1881, the PEF's Survey of Western Palestine (SWP) described the place as having "A few heaps of stones and some foundations. The masonry is medium-size, and well-dressed. The door-posts are of stone; there are cisterns on top of the hill, which is steep."

=== British Mandate era ===
Until 1923, after borders were renegotiated between the British and French governments (who controlled the northern and southern parts of the Levant, respectively, at the time), al-Mansura was a part of Lebanon. Afterward it became part of the Mandatory Palestine and was described as a hamlet by the Palestine Index Gazetteer.

In the 1931 census of Palestine, conducted by the British Mandate government, it was counted under the much larger Christian village of Fassuta. The total population of the two places were 688 inhabitants; 81 Muslims and 607 Christians, in a total of 129 houses. The houses of al-Mansura were spaciously separated from each other and the village had a church dedicated to Mari Yohanna (John the Baptist). The chief source of income was from agriculture and husbandry and the main sources of drinking water came from a well to the north and three water tanks.

In the 1945 statistics, its land was grouped with the lands of Fassuta (existent) and Dayr al-Qassi; the total population was 2,300 and their total land area was 34,011 dunums. 1,607 dunams were plantations and irrigable land, 6,475 used for cereals, while 247 dunams were built-up (urban) land.

=== Israeli period ===
Al-Mansura was believed to have been attacked during the Israeli offensive Operation Hiram in October 1948. In mid-November, the Israeli Army had Palestinian Arab villages on the Lebanese border cleared, including al-Mansura. Its residents were expelled from the village, with some leaving for Lebanon while most were sent to the Arab town of Rameh in the heart of the Galilee. The Maronite Church requested that the Israeli government allow al-Mansura's inhabitants to resettle the village but were refused. The residents of al-Mansura continued to demand permission from the Israeli courts to resettle for some time after, but were unsuccessful.

Several Jewish localities have been built on al-Mansura's lands, including Elkosh established in 1949, the military base Biranit in the early 1950s, Netu'a in 1966, Mattat in 1979 and Abirim in 1980. According to Palestinian historian Walid Khalidi whose researchers visited the village before 1992, "The village houses have been completely leveled. Much of the resulting debris has been pushed together in heaps along the northern edge of the site." The only structure remaining was the partially collapsed church.

== See also ==
- Depopulated Palestinian locations in Israel

== Bibliography ==
- Conder, C.R.; Kitchener, H.H. (1881). The Survey of Western Palestine: Memoirs of the Topography, Orography, Hydrography, and Archaeology. Vol. 1. London: Committee of the Palestine Exploration Fund.
- Department of Statistics (1945). Village Statistics, April, 1945. Government of Palestine.
- Hadawi, S. (1970). Village Statistics of 1945: A Classification of Land and Area ownership in Palestine. Palestine Liberation Organization Research Center. Archived from the original on 2018-12-08.
- Hütteroth, W.-D.; Abdulfattah, K. (1977). Historical Geography of Palestine, Transjordan and Southern Syria in the Late 16th Century. Erlanger Geographische Arbeiten, Sonderband 5. Erlangen, Germany: Vorstand der Fränkischen Geographischen Gesellschaft. ISBN 3-920405-41-2.
- Khalidi, W. (1992). All That Remains: The Palestinian Villages Occupied and Depopulated by Israel in 1948. Washington D.C.: Institute for Palestine Studies. ISBN 0-88728-224-5.
- Mills, E., ed. (1932). Census of Palestine 1931. Population of Villages, Towns and Administrative Areas. Jerusalem: Government of Palestine.
- Morris, B. (2004). The Birth of the Palestinian Refugee Problem Revisited. Cambridge University Press. ISBN 978-0-521-00967-6.
- Palmer, E.H. (1881). The Survey of Western Palestine: Arabic and English Name Lists Collected During the Survey by Lieutenants Conder and Kitchener, R. E. Transliterated and Explained by E.H. Palmer. Committee of the Palestine Exploration Fund.
