= Mattat =

Community settlement in northern Israel

Mattat: מַתָּת (Hebrew)
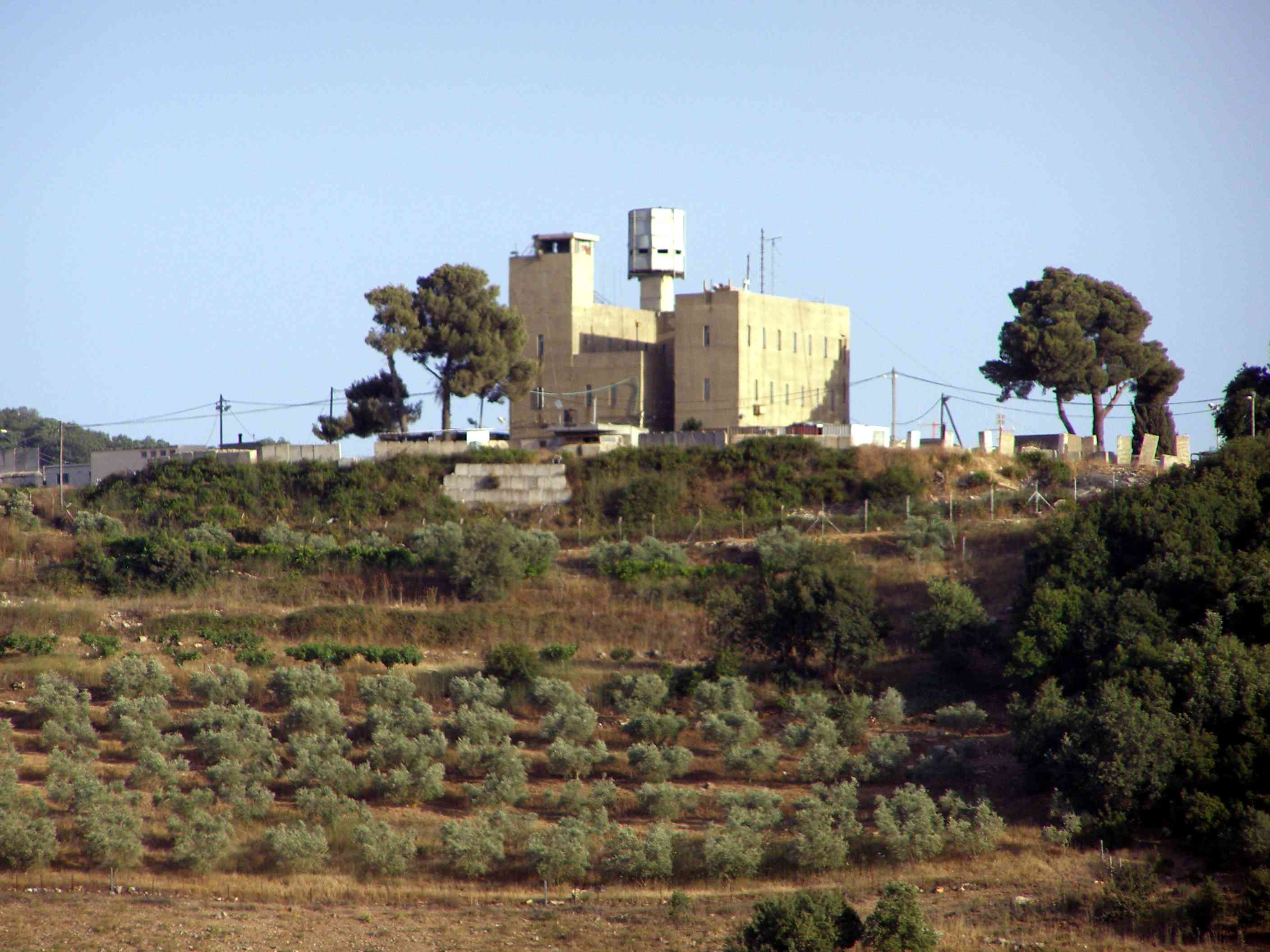
- Sasa Tegart fort

- Location within Northwest Israel Location within Israel
- Coordinates: 33°2′25″N 35°21′17″E
- Country: Israel
- District: Northern
- Subdistrict: Acre
- Council: Ma'ale Yosef
- Founded: 1979
- Founder: HaSuka members
- Population (2024): 232

Mattat (Hebrew: מַתָּת) is a small village in northern Israel. Located near the Lebanese Border between the cities of Ma'alot-Tarshiha and Safed, it falls under the jurisdiction of Ma'ale Yosef Regional Council. In 2024 it had a population of 232.

== History ==
The village was founded in 1979 by a group of families from an organisation called HaSukah, and was the first settlement of the "Lookouts in the Galilee" plan. It is located on land near the Palestinian villages of Dayr al-Qassi and Al-Mansura, both depopulated in the 1948 Arab–Israeli War.

Today many of its residents are employed in local industry and agriculture. Tourism is also an important source of income, and Mattat's scenic setting is featured by several small hotels.

Mattat's name is equivalent in gematria to 840, its altitude in metres. The high location and mountainous region provides the town with a relatively temperate climate. Summer temperatures rarely break 30 °C and humidity is low, and summer nights are even chilly. The winters are cold and wet, with an average of over 800mm precipitation, including the occasional snow.

=== 2023 Gaza war ===
During the Gaza war, northern Israeli border communities, including Mattat, faced targeted attacks by Hezbollah and Palestinian factions based in Lebanon, and were evacuated.
