= Biranit =

Israeli military camp

Coordinates: 33°03′29″N 35°20′33″E

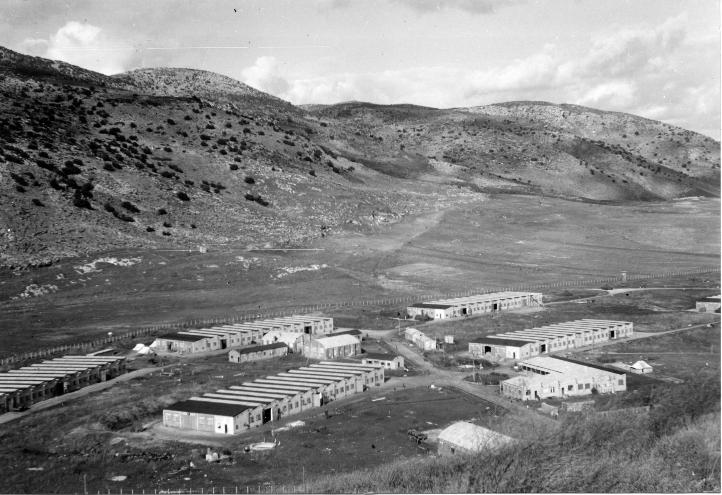
Army camp built on al-Manusra village land in 1948. Evolved into Biranit IDF base.

Biranit (Hebrew: בירנית, lit. small fortress) is a military camp and former kibbutz in northern Israel on the border with Lebanon. It is the headquarters of the Galilee Division of the Israel Defense Forces, and is located around a kilometre from the Lebanese border between Sasa and Netu'a.

== History ==
It is located on the land of the Palestinian village of Al-Mansura, which was forcibly depopulated in the 1948 Arab–Israeli War.

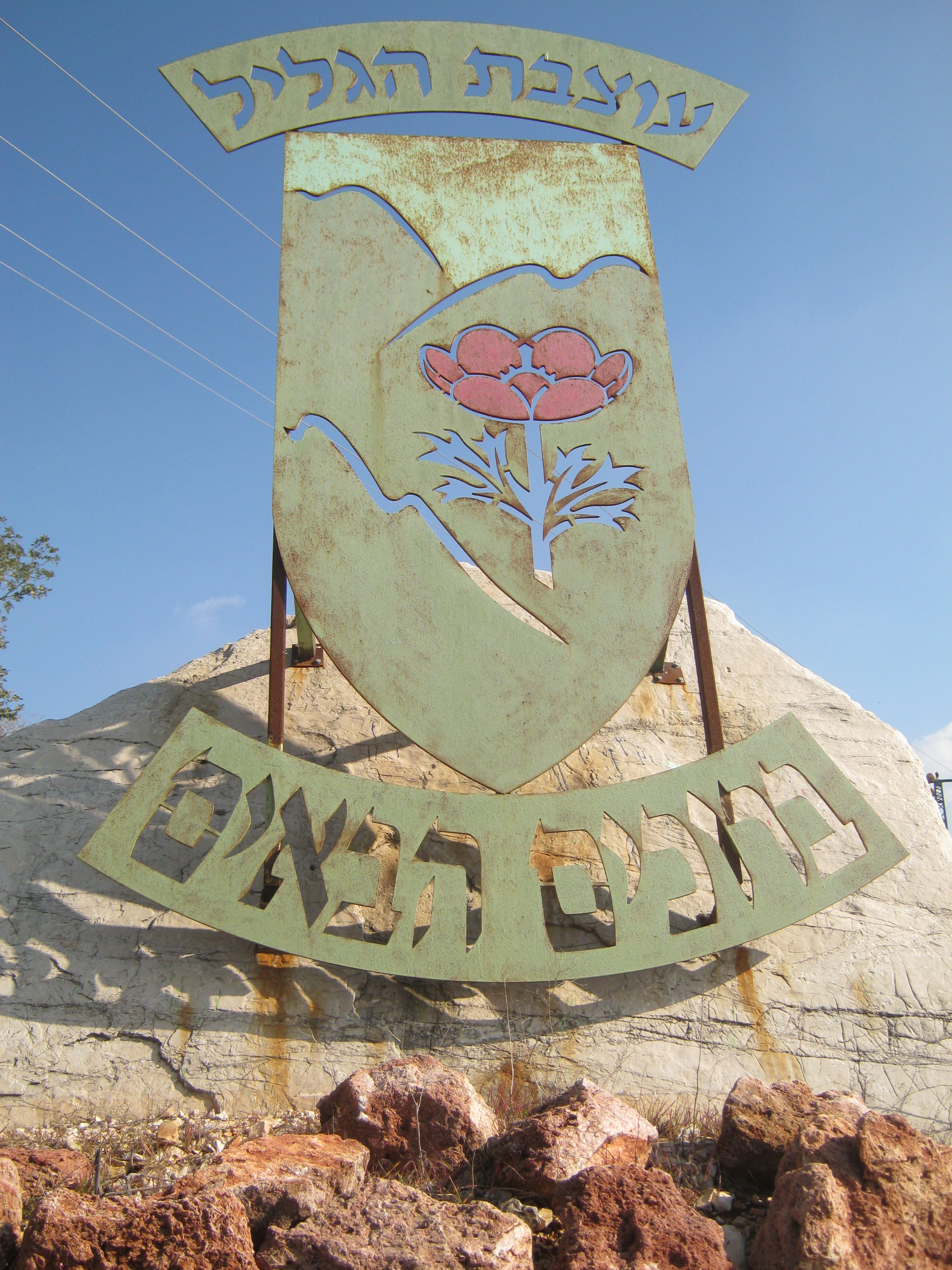
91st Division logo, at Biranit entrance.

Biranit was planned as the hub of a group of settlements established by the Central Galilee Development Project in the 1960s. In December 1964, a Nahal group affiliated with Ha-Kibbutz HaMeuhad settled there. Its first tasks were land reclamation, afforestation, and restoration of ancient woodlands, planting of fruit orchards, road building, and other development work. Over time, the settlement was abandoned, and it became a military camp.

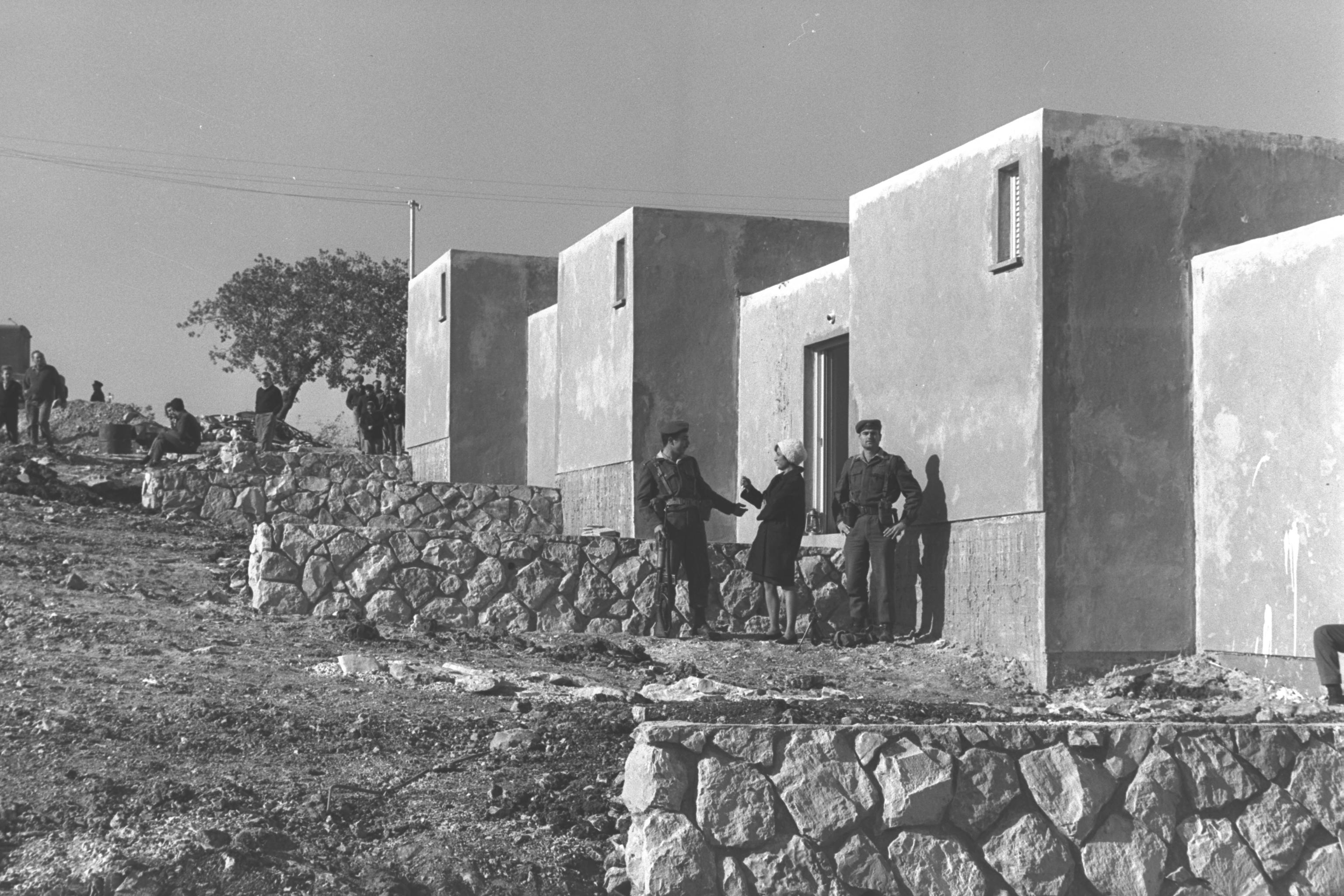
First buildings in Biranit

In the 1970s, a number of Katyusha rockets were fired at Biranit from Lebanese territory. On July 14, 2006, the base was hit by Katyusha rockets fired by Hezbollah during the 2006 Lebanon War. On November 20, 2023, during the Israel–Lebanon border clashes, the base was damaged following a Hezbollah barrage using Burkan rockets.

== Notable residents ==
- Andre Spitzer (1945–1972), Israeli Olympic fencing coach killed in the Munich Massacre
