= Dayr al-Qasi =

Dayr al-Qassi دير القاسي Deir al-Qasi Deir el-Kasy
- Former village
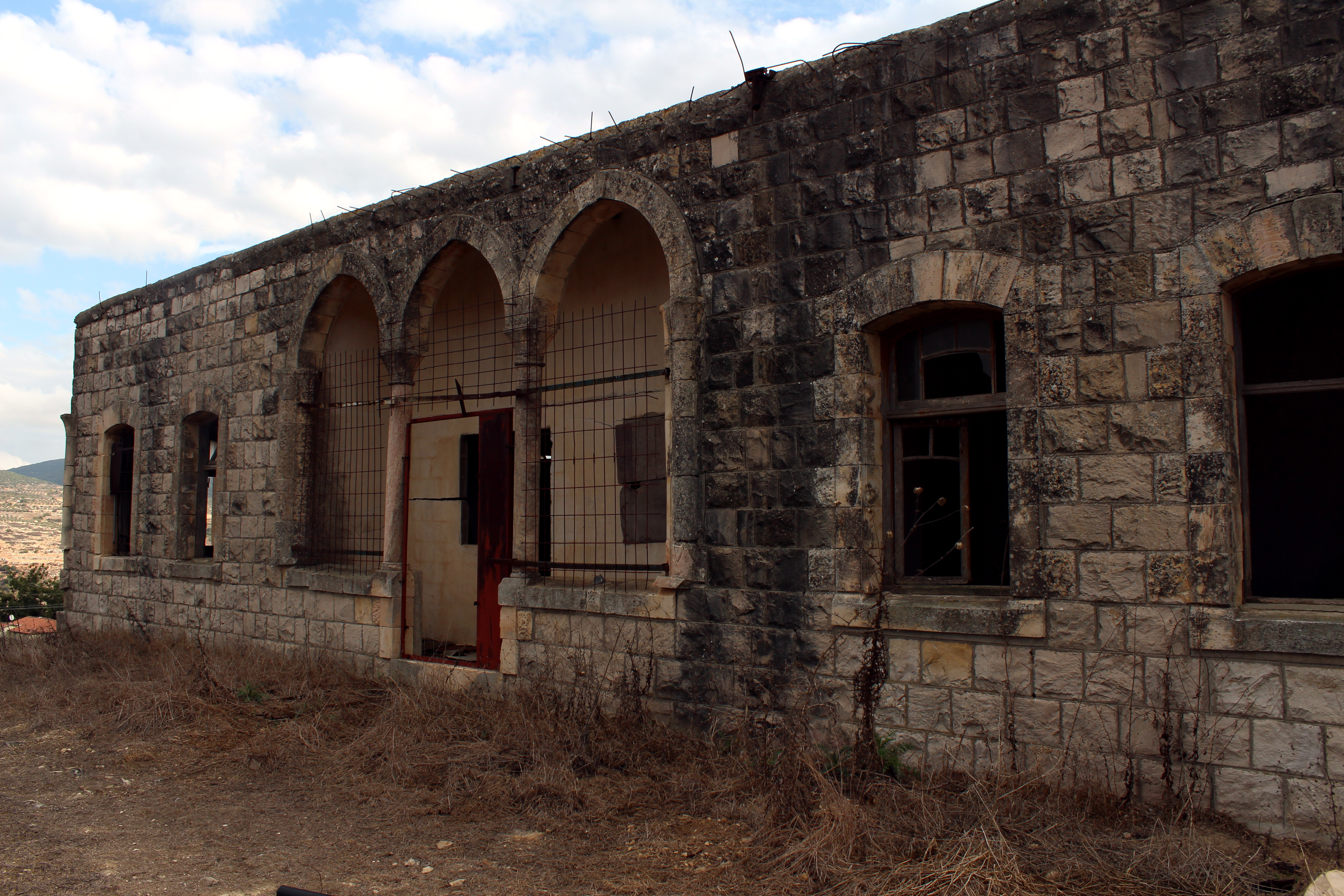
- House belonging to Abdullah Abedalmajeed Alsadek in Dayr al-Qassi
- Etymology: The convent of Wady el Kasy
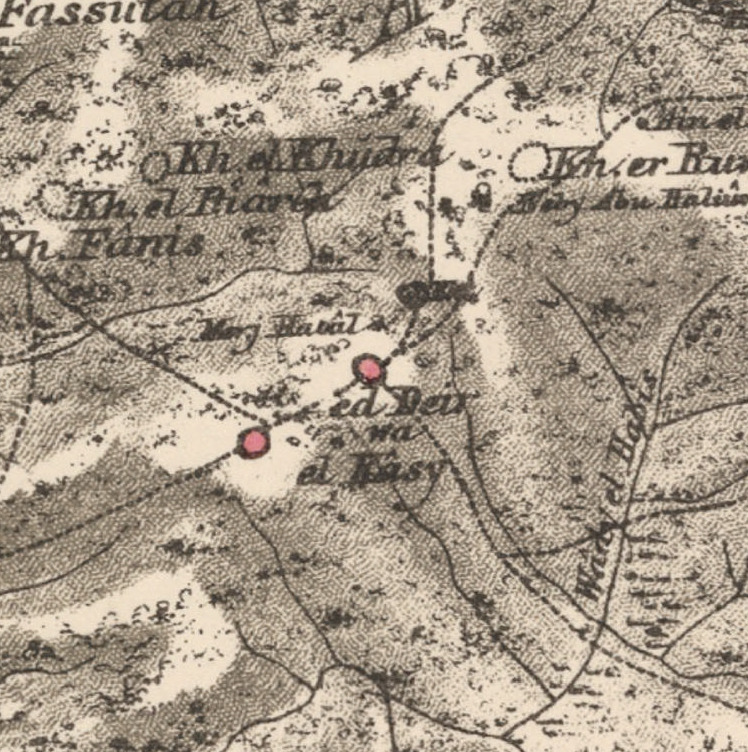
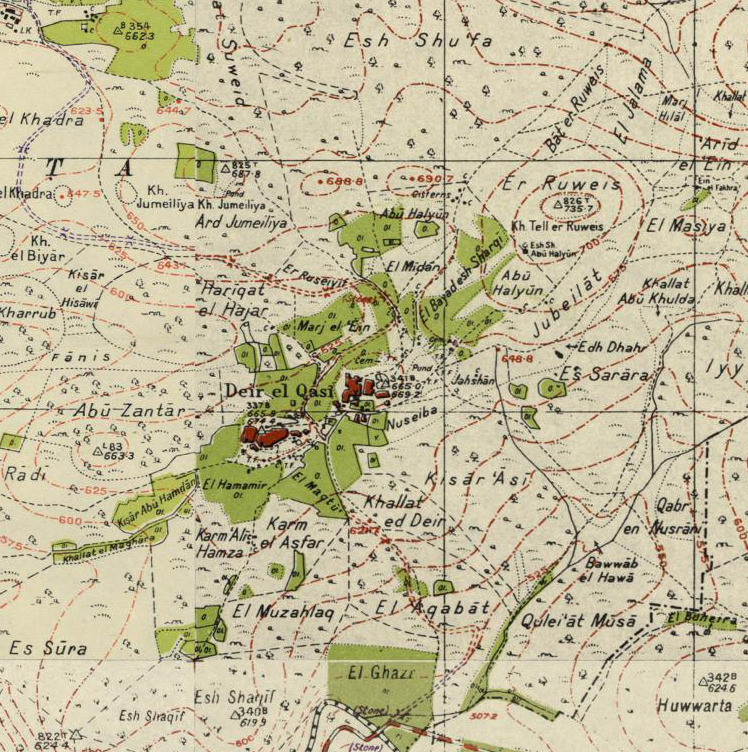
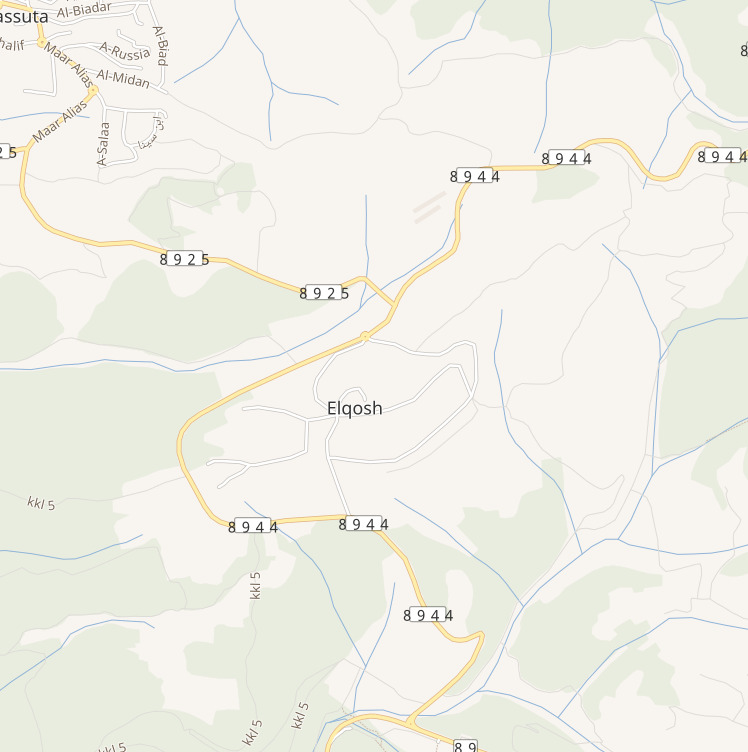
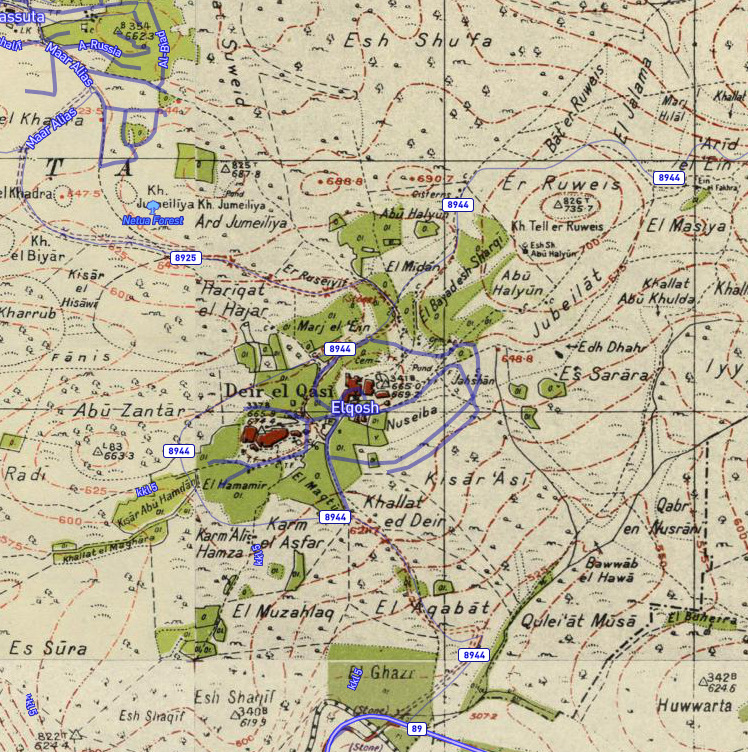
- 1870s map 1940s map modern map 1940s with modern overlay map A series of historical maps of the area around Dayr al-Qassi (click the buttons)

- Location within Mandatory Palestine
- Coordinates: 33°02′07″N 35°19′30″E
- Palestine grid: 181/271
- Geopolitical entity: Mandatory Palestine
- Subdistrict: Acre
- Date of depopulation: 30 October 1948

Area
  - Total: 34.0 km^{2} (13.1 sq mi)

Population (1945)
  - Total: 1,250
- Cause(s) of depopulation: Military assault by Yishuv forces
- Current Localities: Mattat, Elkosh, Abirim, Netu'a

Dayr al-Qasi (Arabic: دير القاسي), was a Palestinian Arab village located 26 km northeast of the city of Acre, which was depopulated during 1948 Arab-Israeli war.

== Geography ==
The village was located 26 km northeast of the city of Acre, on a rocky hill about 5 km south of the Lebanese border. It was linked by a paved road to Fassuta in the north and Tarshiha in the southwest. The road divided the town into an eastern and western quarter, with the eastern quarter higher up.

== History ==
The first part of the village name, Dayr ("monastery") suggest that the village might have had a monastery and a Christian population. However, in modern times the population was Muslim. According to the residents of the village, ancient artifacts from the Canaanite, Israelite and Roman period were unearthed in the Ottoman and British Mandate period.

Ceramics from the late Roman and the Byzantine eras have been found here.

In the Crusader era it was known as Cassie, and in 1183 it was noted that Godfrey de Tor sold the land of the village to Joscelin III. In 1220 Jocelyn III's daughter Beatrix de Courtenay and her husband Otto von Botenlauben, Count of Henneberg, sold their land, including Cassie and the nearby Roeis (Khirbet Tell ‘er-Ruwesah/Tel Rosh), to the Teutonic Knights.

Remains from the Mamluk era have been found in the area.

=== Ottoman Empire ===
Dayr al-Qassi was incorporated into the Ottoman Empire in 1517 and it belonged to the nahiya (subdistrict) of Jira, part of the Safad Sanjak (District of Safed). In the 1596 tax records Dayr al-Qassi had a population of 24 Muslim household; an estimated 132 persons. The villagers paid a fixed tax-rated of 25% on a number of crops, including wheat and barley, as well as on goats and beehives; a total of 345 akçe.

In the early 18th century, Dayr al-Qassi was a fortified village controlled by a local sheikh (chief) named Abd al-Khaliq Salih. In 1740, Sheikh Daher al-Umar, a local multazim (tax farmer) from the Banu Zaydan family whose strength was growing throughout the Galilee, struggled to gain control of Dayr al-Qassi. Later that year, he made the village part of his domain by marrying Sheikh Salih's daughter, thereby sealing an alliance with the latter's family. In late 1767, Daher's son Ali of Safed requested control of Dayr al-Qassi from his father after his request for Dayr Hanna was rejected. Daher refused and the two entered into an armed conflict, which Daher won. Nonetheless, Daher pardoned Ali and ultimately ceded the village to him. It was one several villages listed under Ali's control during his rebellion against his father's successor, the Ottoman-appointed governor Ahmad Pasha al-Jazzar, in 1776.

In 1838, Dayr al-Qassi was noted as a Muslim village in the Jabal subdistrict, located west of Safed.

Victor Guérin visited Dayr al-Qassi in 1875, and he estimated that the village had 350 Muslim inhabitants. In 1881, Dayr al-Qassi was described in the PEF's Survey of Western Palestine (SWP) as being situated on a ridge, encircled by fig and olive trees and arable land. It then had a population of about 200. A population list from about 1887 showed Dayr al-Qassi to have about 945 inhabitants, all Muslims.

=== British Mandate ===
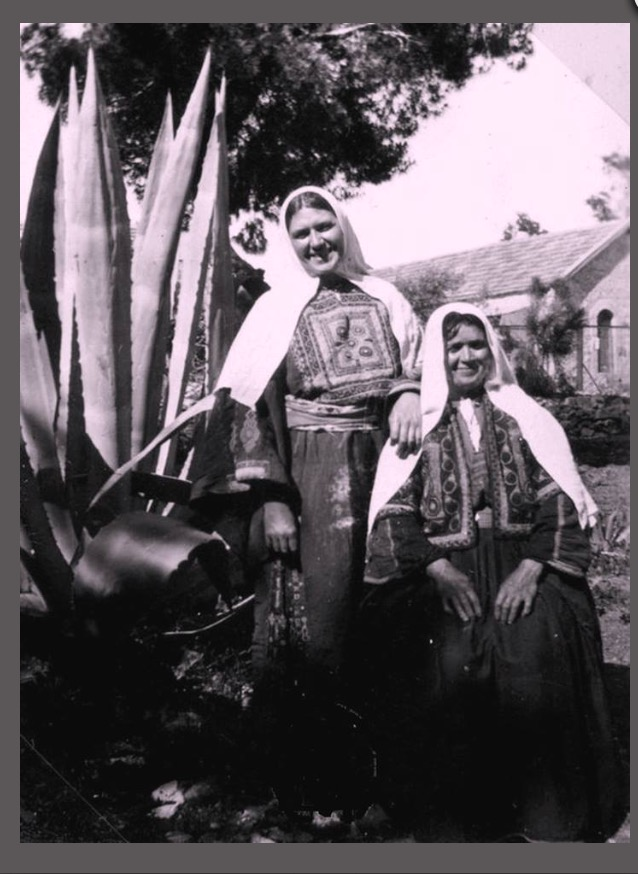
Two women from Dayr al-Qassi, 1937

At the time of the 1922 census of Palestine conducted by the British Mandate, Dayr al-Qassi had a population of 663 Muslims. increasing in the 1931 census, when Dayr al-Qassi had a population of 865, still all Muslims, living in a total of 169 houses.

Later, Dayr al-Qassi was mostly Muslim but had a large Palestinian Christian minority. According to the 1945 census it had 1,250 inhabitants; 370 Christians and 880 Muslims. Together with the two villages of Fassuta and al-Mansura, the population was 2,300 and their total land area was 34,011 dunums. 1,607 dunams were plantations and irrigable land, 6,475 used for cereals, while 247 dunams were built-up (urban) land.

=== The Arab-Israeli War (1948-1949) and Israel ===
During the 1948 Arab-Israeli War Dayr al-Qassi was defended by the Arab Liberation Army but the village was occupied by the Israeli Army during its offensive Operation Hiram on October 30, 1948. At the same time, Dayr al-Qassi was bombed by the Israelis, which they claimed was "by mistake", and seven residents were killed. In December 1948, there was a suggestion of sending new Jewish immigrants to settle al-Bassa, Dayr al-Qassi and Tarshiha, but Aharon Zisling objected to sending militarily untrained immigrants there.

However, in January 1949, the Cabinet voted to "encourage introducing ‘olim into all the abandoned villages in the Galilee". The village's residents were (again) expelled on 27 May 1949 and most migrated north into Lebanon. By June 1949, it was reported that the whole northern area had been "Judaised", including Tarshiha, Suhmata, Dayr al-Qassi, Tarbikha, Meirun, al-Sammu'i, Safsaf and al-Ras al-Ahmar.

Elkosh was established in 1949, and occupies part of the village site. Netu'a, founded in 1966, Mattat, founded in 1979 and Abirim, founded in 1980, are also on village land. Netu'a is near the neighboring village of al-Mansura.

The Palestinian historian, Walid Khalidi, described the remaining structures on the village land in 1992: "A few stone houses still are used as residences or warehouses by the inhabitants of Elqosh. The debris of destroyed houses is strewn over the site. The school building stands deserted. Fig and olive trees and cactuses grow on the site." In 2004, some of the remains of the village were removed by mechanical equipment during excavations by the Israel Antiquities Authority.

In 2000, a book about the village history was published by Ibrahim Khalil Uthman.

== Notable people ==
- Nabil Marouf, (ar) Palestinian Ambassador to Canada, born in Dayr al-Qassi in 1946.

== Gallery ==
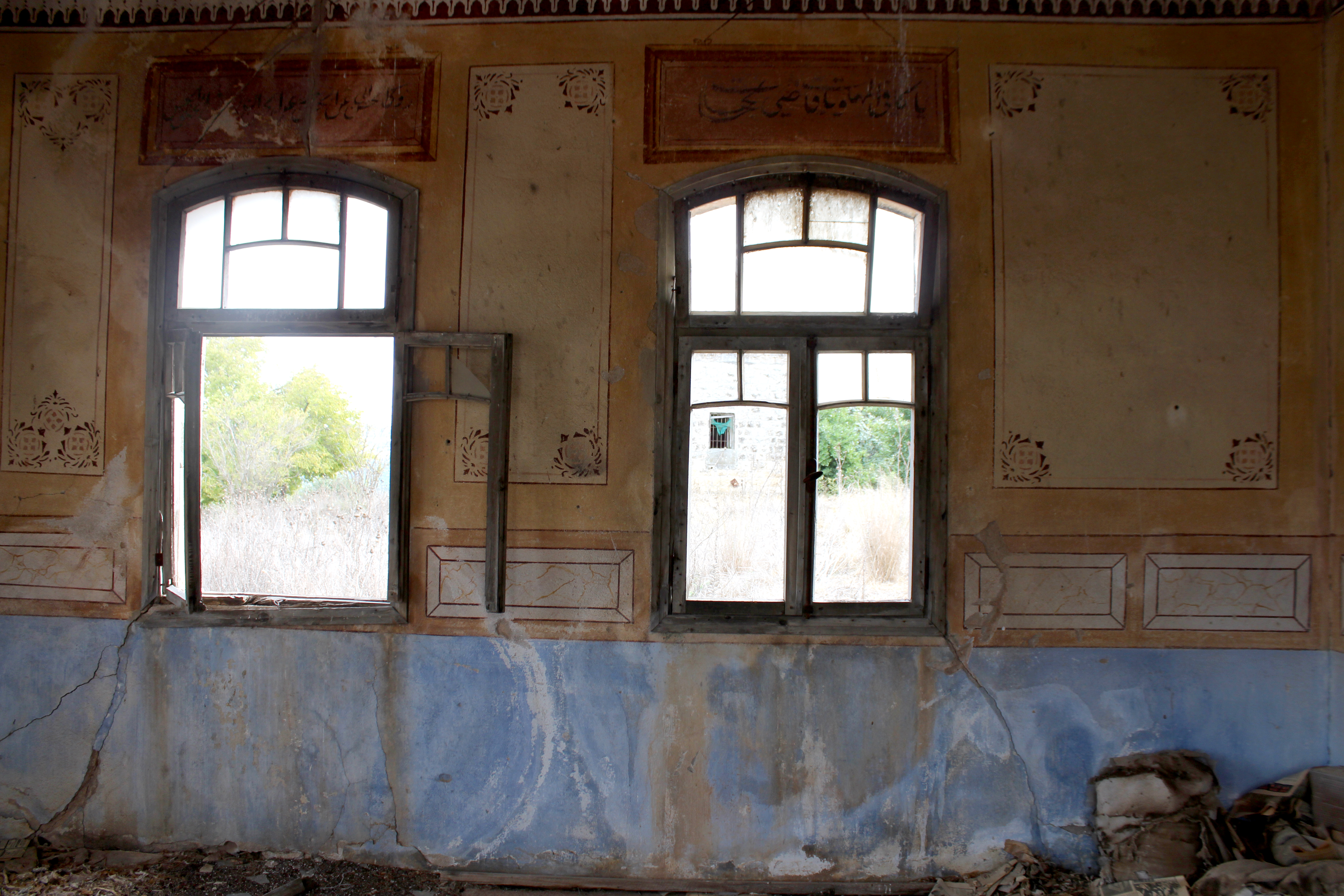

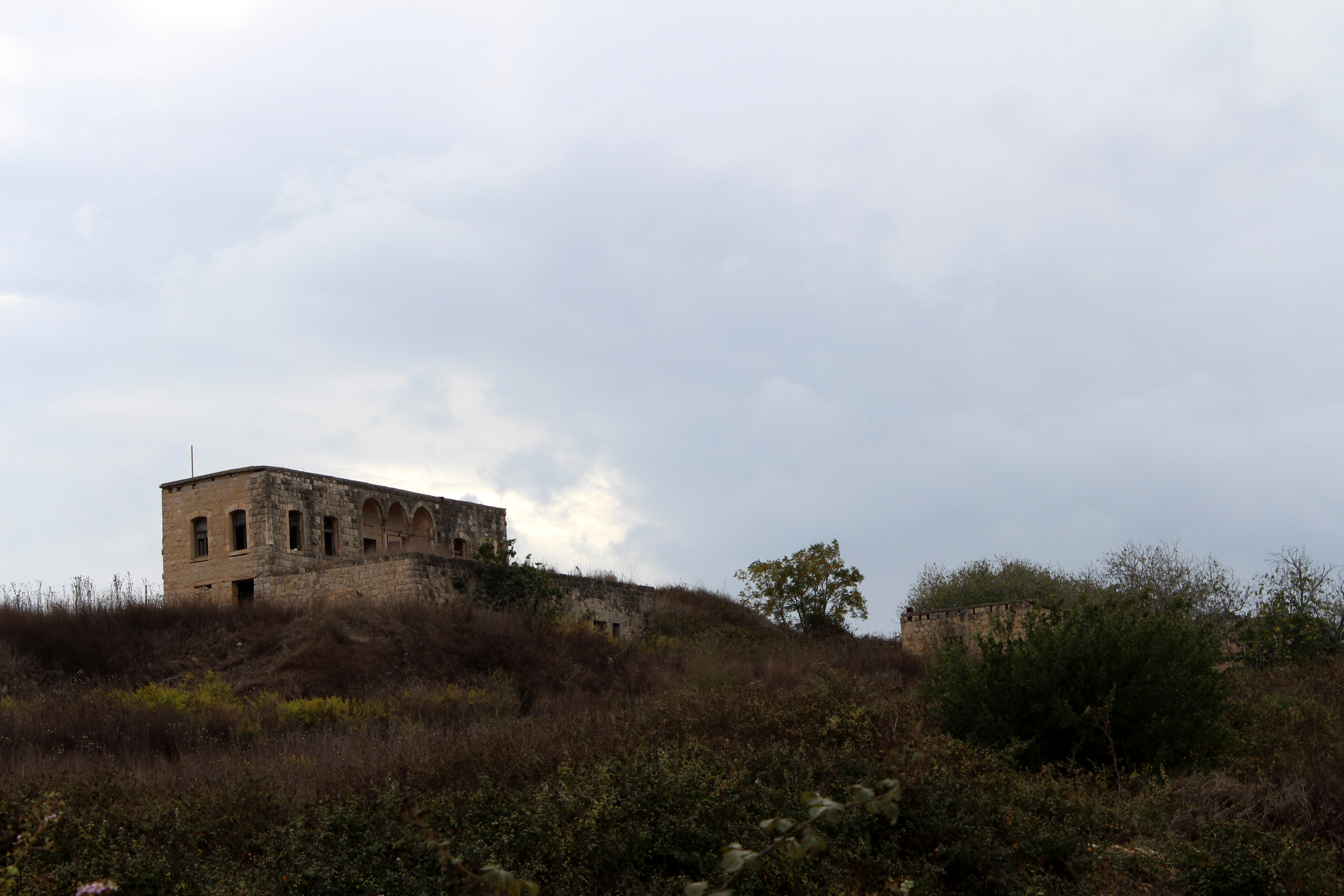

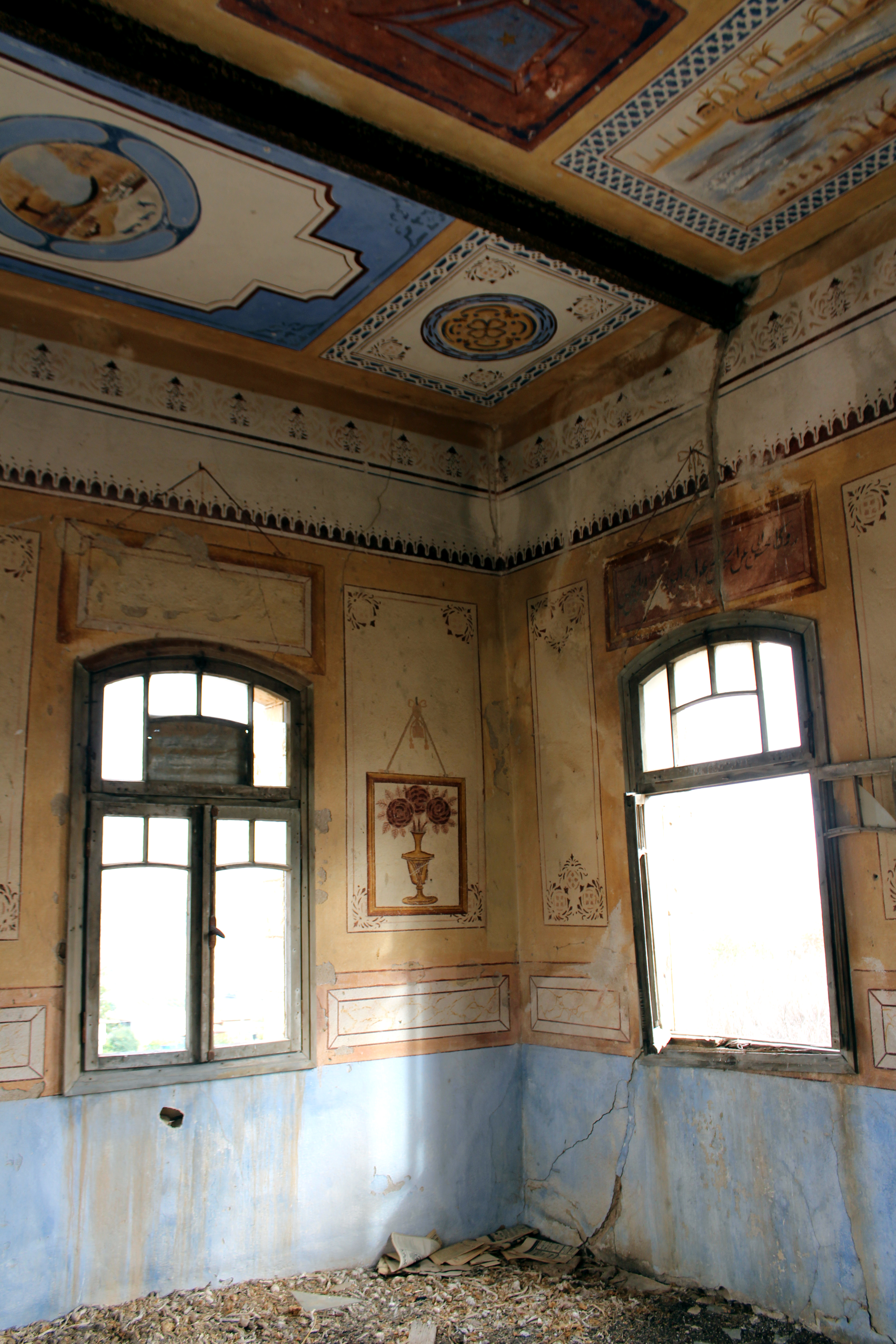

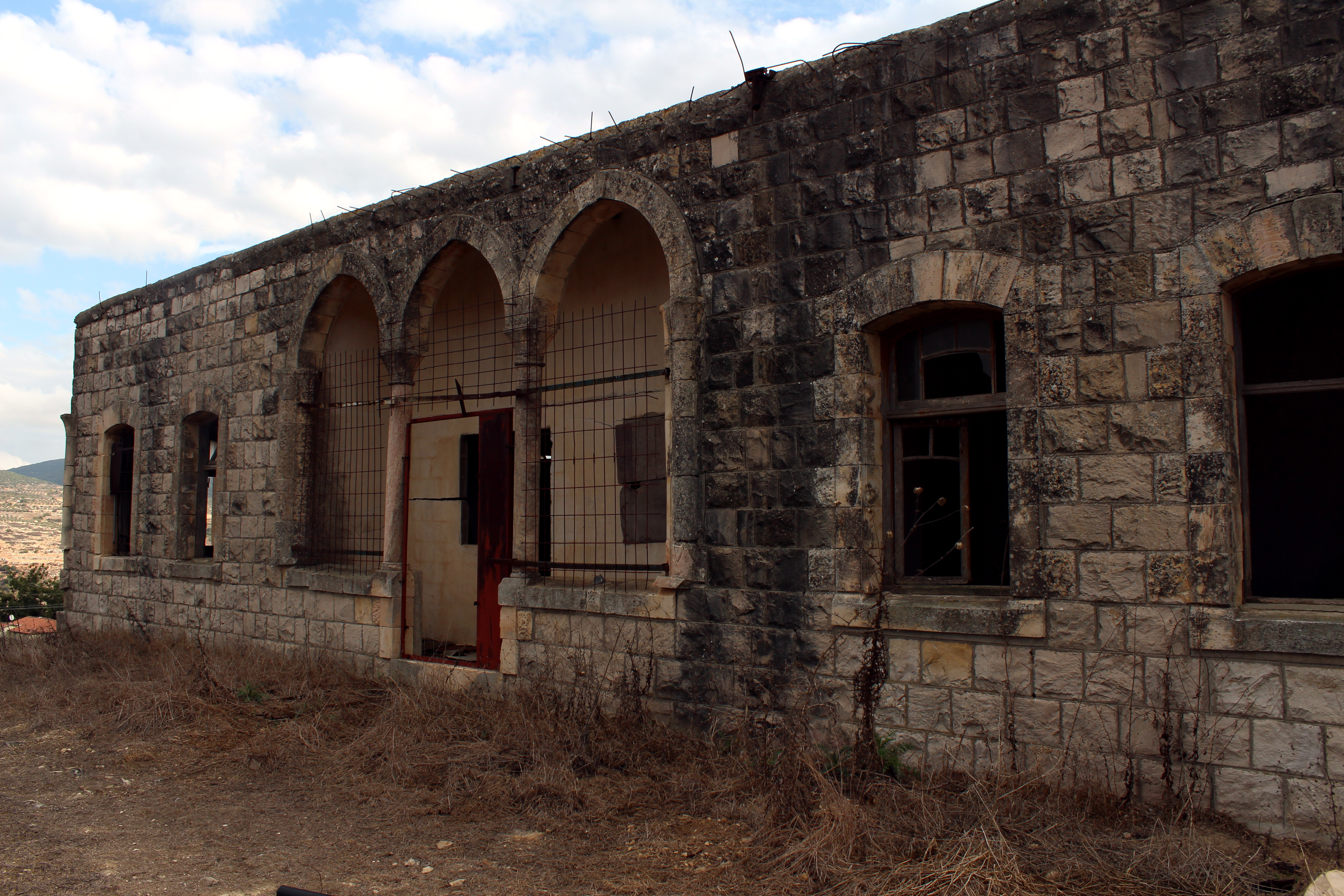

== See also ==
- Depopulated Palestinian locations in Israel

== Bibliography ==
- Barron, J. B., ed. (1923). Palestine: Report and General Abstracts of the Census of 1922. Government of Palestine.
- Braun, Eliot (2004-06-09). "Elqosh Archive Report- Final Report". Hadashot Arkheologiyot – Excavations and Surveys in Israel (116). Archived from the original on 2014-10-25.
- Cohen, Amnon (1973). Palestine in the 18th Century: Patterns of Government and Administration. Jerusalem: The Magnes Press. ISBN 978-0-19-647903-3.
- Conder, C.R.; Kitchener, H.H. (1881). The Survey of Western Palestine: Memoirs of the Topography, Orography, Hydrography, and Archaeology. Vol. 1. London: Committee of the Palestine Exploration Fund.
- Dauphin, C. (1998). La Palestine byzantine, Peuplement et Populations. BAR International Series 726 (in French). Vol. III : Catalogue. Oxford: Archeopress. ISBN 0-860549-05-4.
- Davis, Rochelle (2011). Palestinian Village Histories: Geographies of the Displaced. Stanford: Stanford University Press. ISBN 978-0-8047-7313-3.
- Department of Statistics (1945). Village Statistics, April, 1945. Government of Palestine.
- Frankel, Rafael (1988). "Topographical notes on the territory of Acre in the Crusader period". Israel Exploration Journal. 38 (4): 249–272.
- Guérin, V. (1880). Description Géographique Historique et Archéologique de la Palestine (in French). Vol. 3: Galilee, pt. 2. Paris: L'Imprimerie Nationale.
- Hadawi, S. (1970). Village Statistics of 1945: A Classification of Land and Area ownership in Palestine. Palestine Liberation Organization Research Center.
- Hütteroth, W.-D.; Abdulfattah, K. (1977). Historical Geography of Palestine, Transjordan and Southern Syria in the Late 16th Century. Erlanger Geographische Arbeiten, Sonderband 5. Erlangen, Germany: Vorstand der Fränkischen Geographischen Gesellschaft. ISBN 3-920405-41-2.
- Khalidi, W. (1992). All That Remains: The Palestinian Villages Occupied and Depopulated by Israel in 1948. Washington D.C.: Institute for Palestine Studies. ISBN 0-88728-224-5.
- Joudah, Ahmad Hasan (1987). Revolt in Palestine in the Eighteenth Century: The Era of Shaykh Zahir Al-ʻUmar. Kingston Press. ISBN 9780940670112.
- Lerer, Yoav (2011-04-13). "Elqosh - Final Report". Hadashot Arkheologiyot – Excavations and Surveys in Israel (123). Archived from the original on 2014-10-25.
- Mills, E., ed. (1932). Census of Palestine 1931. Population of Villages, Towns and Administrative Areas. Jerusalem: Government of Palestine.
- Morris, B. (2004). The Birth of the Palestinian Refugee Problem Revisited. Cambridge University Press. ISBN 978-0-521-00967-6.
- Palmer, E. H. (1881). The Survey of Western Palestine: Arabic and English Name Lists Collected During the Survey by Lieutenants Conder and Kitchener, R. E. Transliterated and Explained by E.H. Palmer. Committee of the Palestine Exploration Fund.
- Rhode, H. (1979). Administration and Population of the Sancak of Safed in the Sixteenth Century (PhD). Columbia University. Archived from the original on 2020-03-01.
- Robinson, E.; Smith, E. (1841). Biblical Researches in Palestine, Mount Sinai and Arabia Petraea: A Journal of Travels in the year 1838. Vol. 3. Boston: Crocker & Brewster.
- Röhricht, R. (1893). (RRH) Regesta regni Hierosolymitani (MXCVII-MCCXCI) (in Latin). Berlin: Libraria Academica Wageriana.
- Schumacher, G. (1888). "Population list of the Liwa of Akka". Quarterly Statement - Palestine Exploration Fund. 20: 169–191.
- Strehlke, E., ed. (1869). Tabulae Ordinis Theutonici ex tabularii regii Berolinensis codice potissimum. Berlin: Weidmanns.
- Uthman, Ibrahim Khalil. Dayr al-Qasi: Zanbaqa Khalil al-awsat al-gharbi. Tyre, Lebanon, n.p.
