= Fassuta =

Christian Arab village in Israel

Fassuta: פסוטה; فسوطة
- Local council

Hebrew transcription(s)
  - ISO 259: P̄assúṭa
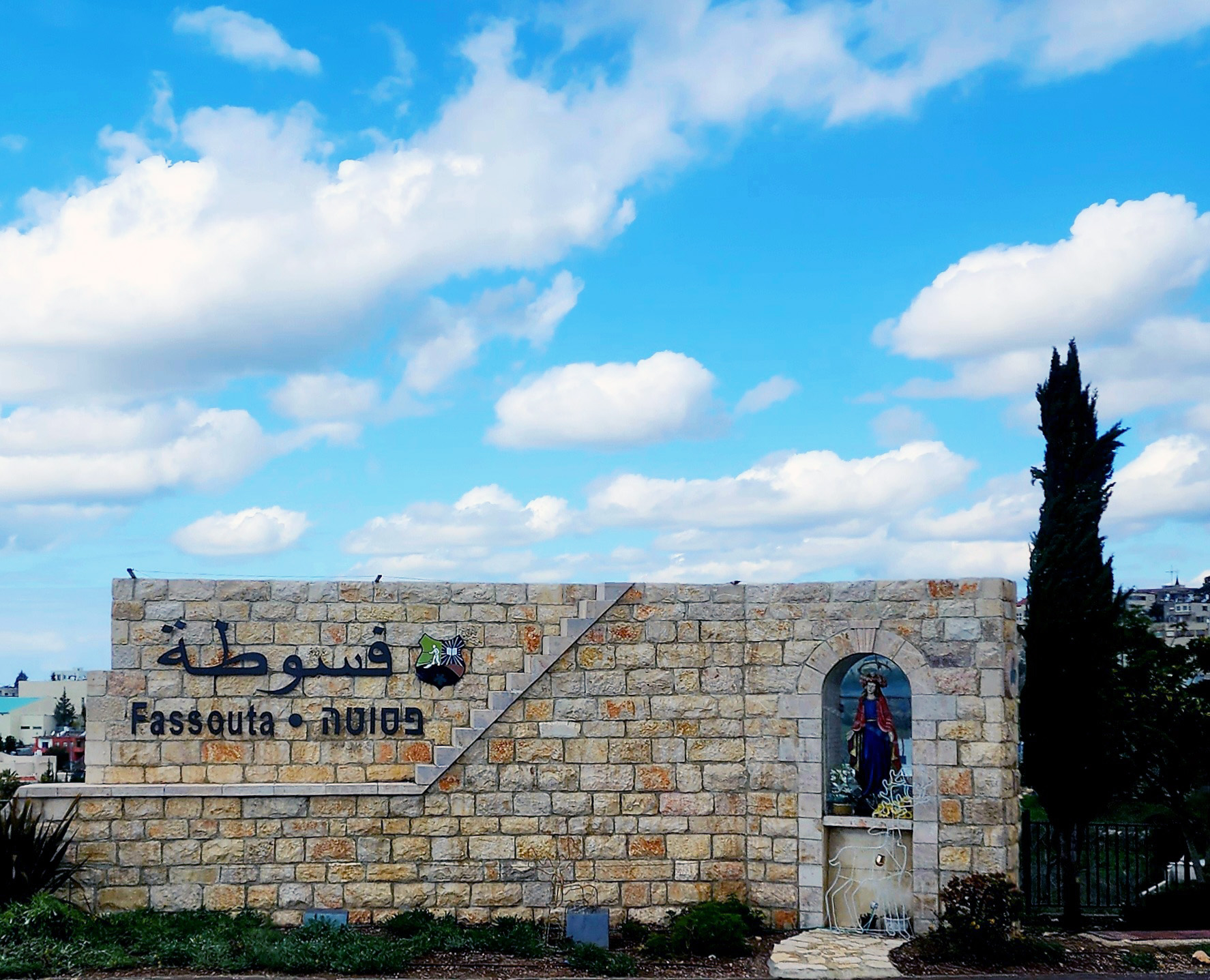
- Entrance to Fassuta

- Location within Northwest Israel Location within Israel
- Coordinates: 33°02′58″N 35°18′21″E
- Grid position: 179/272 PAL
- Country: Israel
- District: Northern
- Subdistrict: Acre
- Natural Region: Elon

Population (2024)
  - Total: 3,426

Ethnicity
  - Arabs: 99.7%
  - Others: 0.3%
- Name meaning: Fassute, personal name

Fassuta (Arabic: فسوطة, Hebrew: פסוטה) is a Christian Arab local council in the Northern District of Israel. It is located in the Upper Galilee on the northwestern slopes of Mount Meron, south of the Lebanese border. In 2024 it had a population of 3,426, nearly all of whom are Melkite Christian Arabs. In 2022, 99.8% of the population was Christian and 0.2% was Muslim.

== History ==
Archaeological excavations at Fassuta have revealed settlement from the Early Bronze Age, through the Iron Age, Hellenistic and the Mamluk eras.

From approximately 70 CE to 450 CE, Fassuta was the site of a Jewish town called Mafsheta. Mafsheta is associated with one of the twenty-four priestly divisions, as the residence of the priestly clan known as Harim.

In the Crusader era Fassuta was known as Fassove. In 1183, Godfrey de Tor sold the village land to Joscelin III. In 1220 Jocelyn III's daughter Beatrix de Courtenay and her husband Otto von Botenlauben, Count of Henneberg, sold their land, including Fassove, to the Teutonic Knights.

=== Ottoman Empire ===
In 1517, Fassuta was incorporated into the Ottoman Empire. In the 1596 tax records it was part of the Nahiya of Akka of the Safad Sanjak and had a population of 12 Muslim households and 3 Muslim bachelors. The villagers paid a fixed tax-rate of 20% on wheat, barley, fruit trees, and goats or beehives.

In 1838 Fesutha was described as a Christian and Druze village in the El-Jebel district, west of Safed.

In 1875, Victor Guérin found "twenty united Greek families" living in the village which had been built on an ancient site, of which there were many remains.

In 1881, the PEF's "Survey of Western Palestine" (SWP) described Fassuta as "a village, built of stone, containing about 200 Christians, situated on ridge, with gardens of figs, olives, and arable land. There are two cisterns in the village, and a good spring near."

According to a population list from 1887, there were 570 inhabitants.

=== British Mandate ===
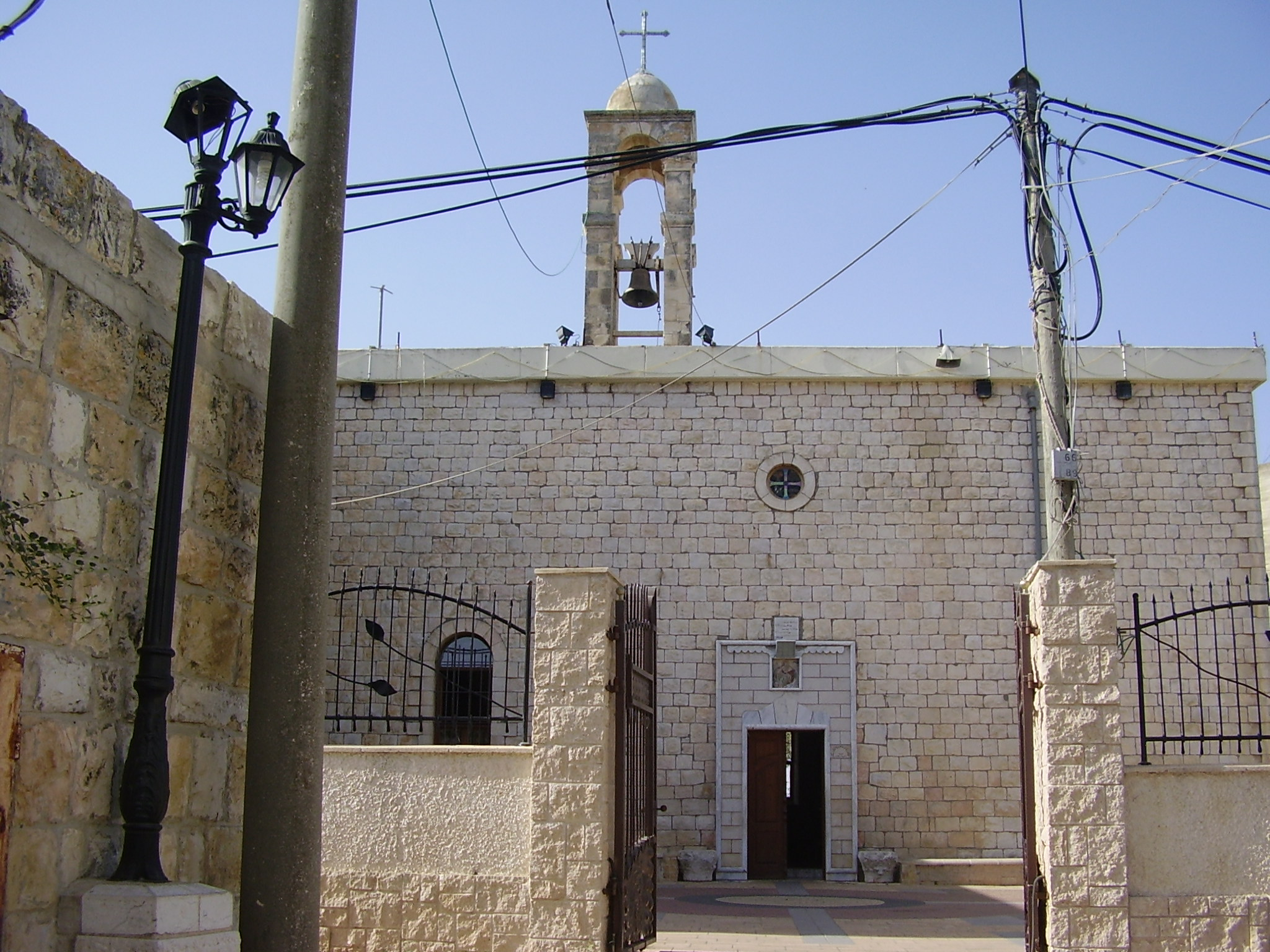
Mar Elias Church in Fassuta

At the time of the 1922 census of Palestine conducted by the British Mandate, Fassuta had a population of 459: 444 Christians and 15 Muslims. The Christians included 1 Orthodox Christian, 18 Syrian Orthodox, and 425 Melkites. In the 1931 census, the combined population of Fassuta and Mansura was 507 Palestinian Christians and 81 Muslims, living in a total of 129 houses.

In the 1945 statistics Fassuta had 1,050 inhabitants. The combined population of Fassuta, Al-Mansura and Dayr al-Qasi was 2,300, and their total land area was 34,011 dunums. 1,607 dunams were plantations and irrigable land, 6,475 used for cereals, while 247 dunams were built-up (urban) land. Between 1922 and 1947, the population of Fassuta increased by 120%.

=== Israel ===
At the end of October 1948, during Operation Hiram, the village was captured by the Israeli army. Most of the Muslims fled or were expelled but many Christians remained. In December 1949, the Israel Defense Forces devised a plan to create a 5–10 km Arab-free zone along the Lebanon border by ordering those who remained in Fassuta and five other villages to leave. However, the plan was rejected, and the village remained under martial Law until 1966.

In April 2023, a resident of Fassuta was injured in a rocket attack from Lebanon attributed to the militant group Hamas.

== Demographics ==
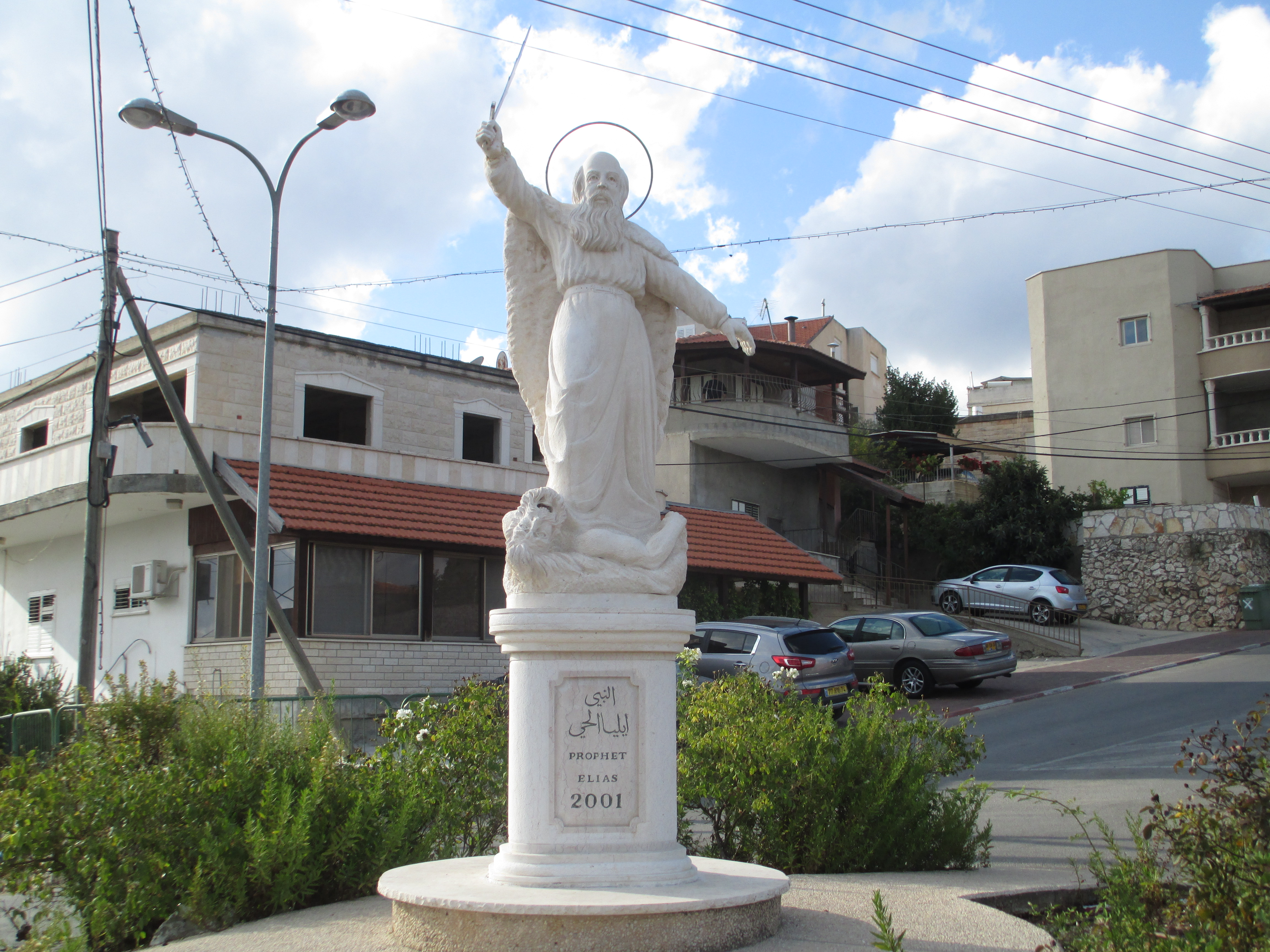
Prophet Elijah statue in Fassuta

In 2005, Fassuta had a population of 2,900, with an annual population growth rate of 0.9%. All were Christian Arabs of the Melkite (Greek) Catholic Church.

In 2022, the village had a population of 3,255 people, of which 99.7% of them were Arabs and the 0.3% were other ethnicities. Fassuta does not have a Jewish population.

== Religion and culture ==
The Mar Elias Church in Fassuta celebrated its 100th anniversary in 2007. The church is named for Elias, the village's patron saint. A large statue of Elijah stands in the central square.

Beit Rima is a center for culture, tourism and art established in a historic home in Fassuta.

== Archaeology ==
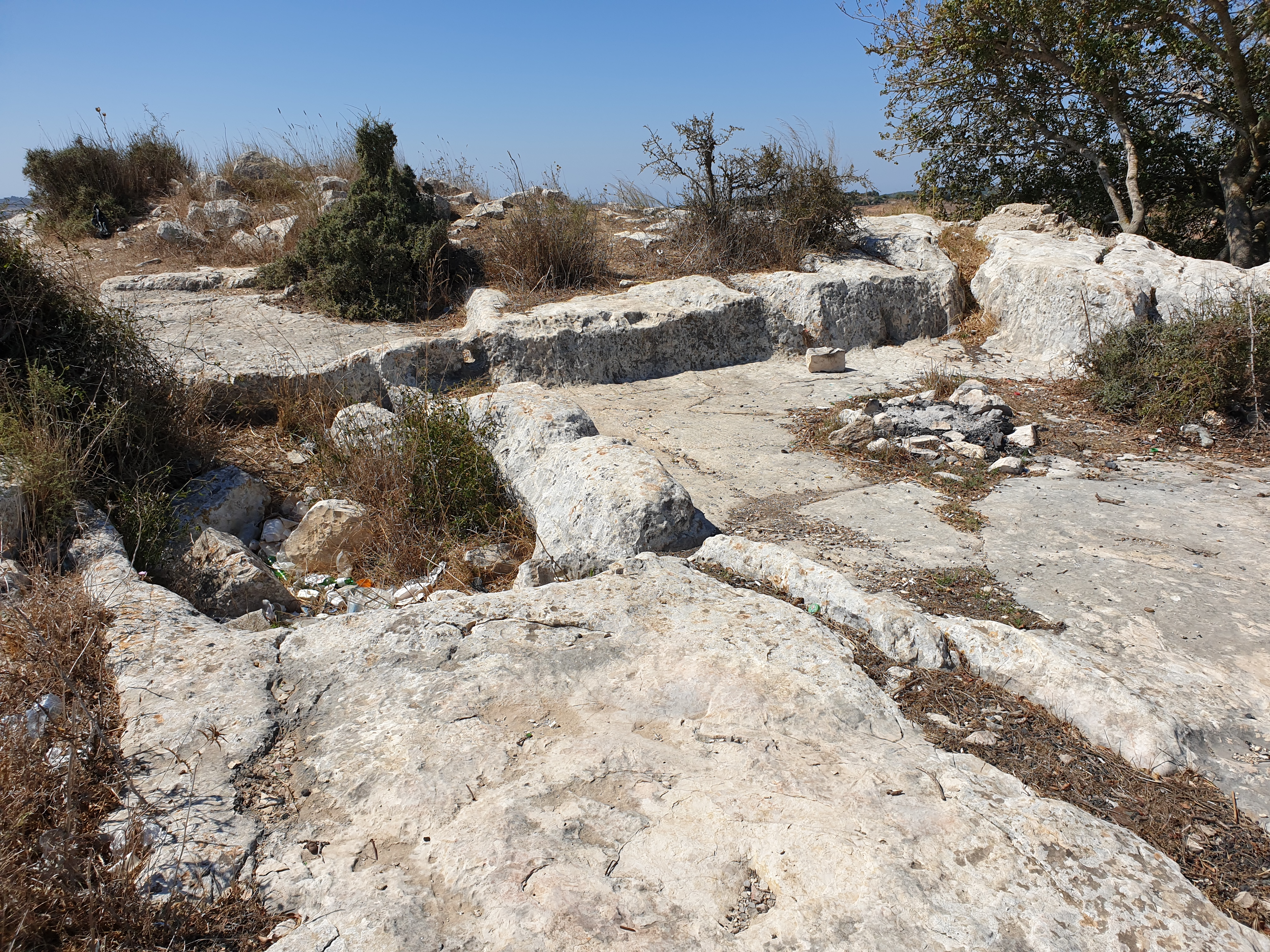
Winepress in Fassuta

In 1875, Victor Guérin found "numerous cisterns, a great reservoir, vestiges of many ruined houses, fine cut stones marking out floors, and a dozen of winepresses nearly perfect. These winepresses are all on the same model. Worked in the rock, they consisted of two compartments, one larger, in which the grapes were placed, and one smaller and lower down, in which the juice was received." In the church Guerin saw a Corinthian pillar, probably Byzantine, carved with a cross. Above the door was a frieze finely decorated with flowers and foliage.

== Voting Patterns ==
In the 2026 election, 62 percent of voters in Fassuta voted for the Arab parties, while 34 percent voted for the parties of the center-left coalition led by Gadi Eisenkot and 2 percent voted for the parties of the right-wing coalition led by Benjamin Netanyahu. Voter turnout increased 63 percent from the 2022 election.

== Notable people ==
- Sabri Jiryis
- Habib Qahwaji
- Anton Shammas

== See also ==
- Arab localities in Israel
- Christianity in Israel

== Bibliography ==
- Abu-‘Uqsa, Hanaa (2013-12-12). "Fassuta, Survey Final Report". Hadashot Arkheologiyot – Excavations and Surveys in Israel (125).
- Barron, J. B., ed. (1923). Palestine: Report and General Abstracts of the Census of 1922. Government of Palestine.
- Bron, Hendrik (Enno) (2007-04-22). "Fassuta Final Report". Hadashot Arkheologiyot – Excavations and Surveys in Israel (119).
- Bron, Hendrik (Enno) (2010-05-18). "Fassuta Preliminary Report". Hadashot Arkheologiyot – Excavations and Surveys in Israel (122).
- Conder, C.R.; Kitchener, H.H. (1881). The Survey of Western Palestine: Memoirs of the Topography, Orography, Hydrography, and Archaeology. Vol. 1. London: Committee of the Palestine Exploration Fund.
- Dauphin, C. (1998). La Palestine byzantine, Peuplement et Populations. BAR International Series 726 (in French). Vol. III : Catalogue. Oxford: Archeopress. ISBN 0-860549-05-4. (p. 633 )
- Department of Statistics (1945). Village Statistics, April, 1945. Government of Palestine.
- Frankel, Rafael (1988). "Topographical notes on the territory of Acre in the Crusader period". Israel Exploration Journal. 38 (4): 249–272.
- Guérin, V. (1880). Description Géographique Historique et Archéologique de la Palestine (in French). Vol. 3: Galilee, pt. 2. Paris: L'Imprimerie Nationale.
- Hadawi, S. (1970). Village Statistics of 1945: A Classification of Land and Area ownership in Palestine. Palestine Liberation Organization Research Center.
- Hütteroth, W.-D.; Abdulfattah, K. (1977). Historical Geography of Palestine, Transjordan and Southern Syria in the Late 16th Century. Erlanger Geographische Arbeiten, Sonderband 5. Erlangen, Germany: Vorstand der Fränkischen Geographischen Gesellschaft. ISBN 3-920405-41-2.
- Mills, E., ed. (1932). Census of Palestine 1931. Population of Villages, Towns and Administrative Areas. Jerusalem: Government of Palestine.
- Morris, B. (1987). The Birth of the Palestinian Refugee Problem. Cambridge University Press. ISBN 0-521-33028-9.
- Palmer, E.H. (1881). The Survey of Western Palestine: Arabic and English Name Lists Collected During the Survey by Lieutenants Conder and Kitchener, R. E. Transliterated and Explained by E.H. Palmer. Committee of the Palestine Exploration Fund.
- Robinson, E.; Smith, E. (1841). Biblical Researches in Palestine, Mount Sinai and Arabia Petraea: A Journal of Travels in the year 1838. Vol. 3. Boston: Crocker & Brewster.
- Röhricht, R. (1893). (RRH) Regesta regni Hierosolymitani (MXCVII-MCCXCI) (in Latin). Berlin: Libraria Academica Wageriana.
- Schumacher, G. (1888). "Population list of the Liwa of Akka". Quarterly Statement - Palestine Exploration Fund. 20: 169–191.
- Strehlke, E., ed. (1869). Tabulae Ordinis Theutonici ex tabularii regii Berolinensis codice potissimum. Berlin: Weidmanns.
- Tahan, Hagit (2008-12-30). "Fassuta Final Report". Hadashot Arkheologiyot – Excavations and Surveys in Israel (121).
