= Elkosh =

Moshav in northern Israel

Elkosh: אֶלְקוֹשׁ (Hebrew)
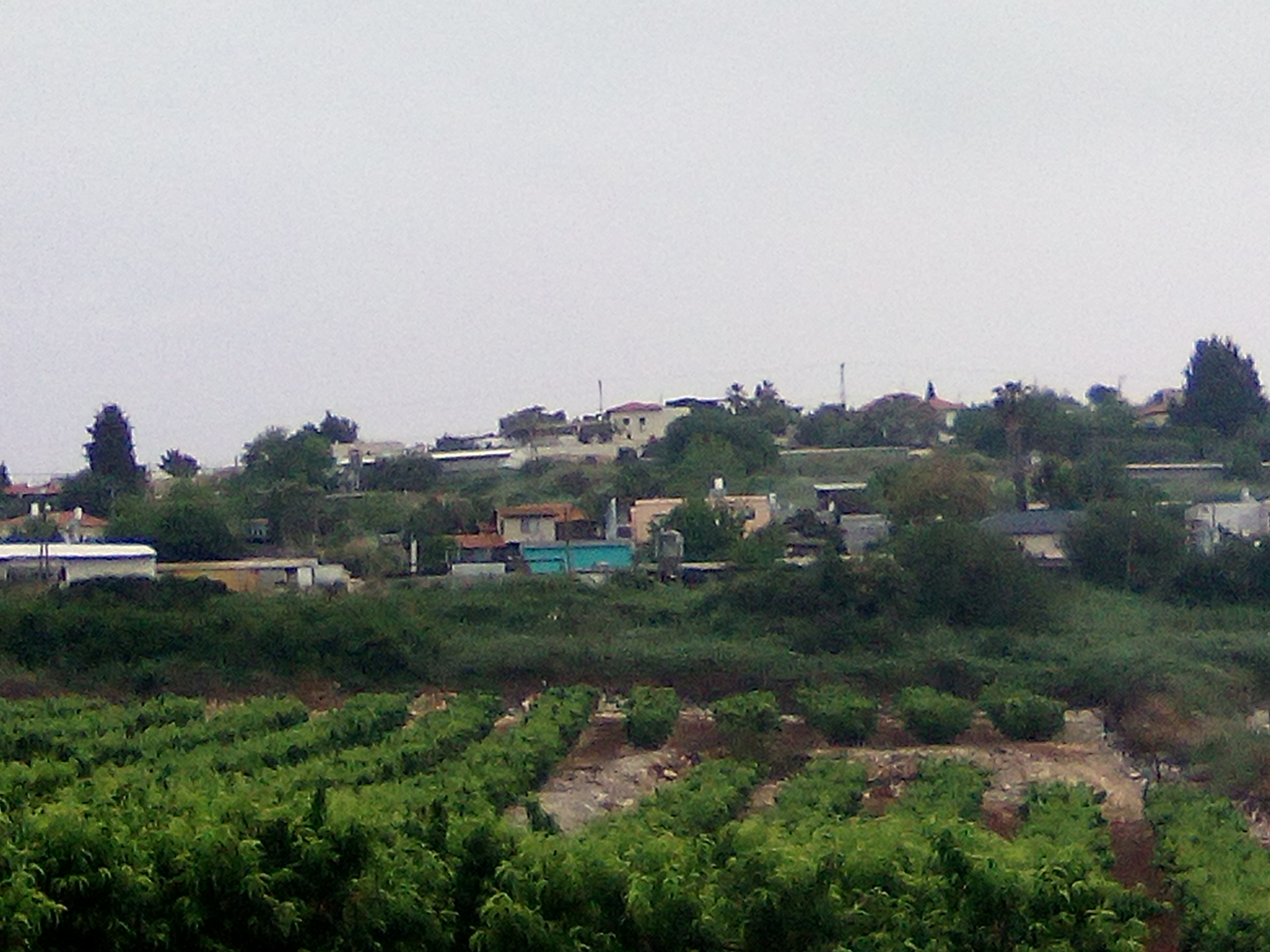

- Location within Northwest Israel Location within Israel
- Coordinates: 33°2′0″N 35°19′22″E
- Country: Israel
- District: Northern
- Subdistrict: Acre
- Council: Ma'ale Yosef
- Affiliation: Moshavim Movement
- Founded: 1949
- Founder: Yemenite Jews
- Population (2024): 282

Elkosh (Hebrew: אֶלְקוֹשׁ) is a moshav in northern Israel. Located near Ma'alot-Tarshiha and the Lebanese border, it falls under the jurisdiction of Ma'ale Yosef Regional Council. In 2024 it had a population of 282.

== History ==
The village was established in 1949 by immigrants from Yemen on land located near the Palestinian villages of Dayr al-Qassi and Al-Mansura, both depopulated in the 1948 Arab–Israeli War.

It was named after the biblical city of Elkosh, the birthplace of prophet Nahum (Nahum 1:1), which may have been located in the area. The founders were later joined by more immigrants from Kurdistan.
