= Netu'a =

Moshav in northern Israel

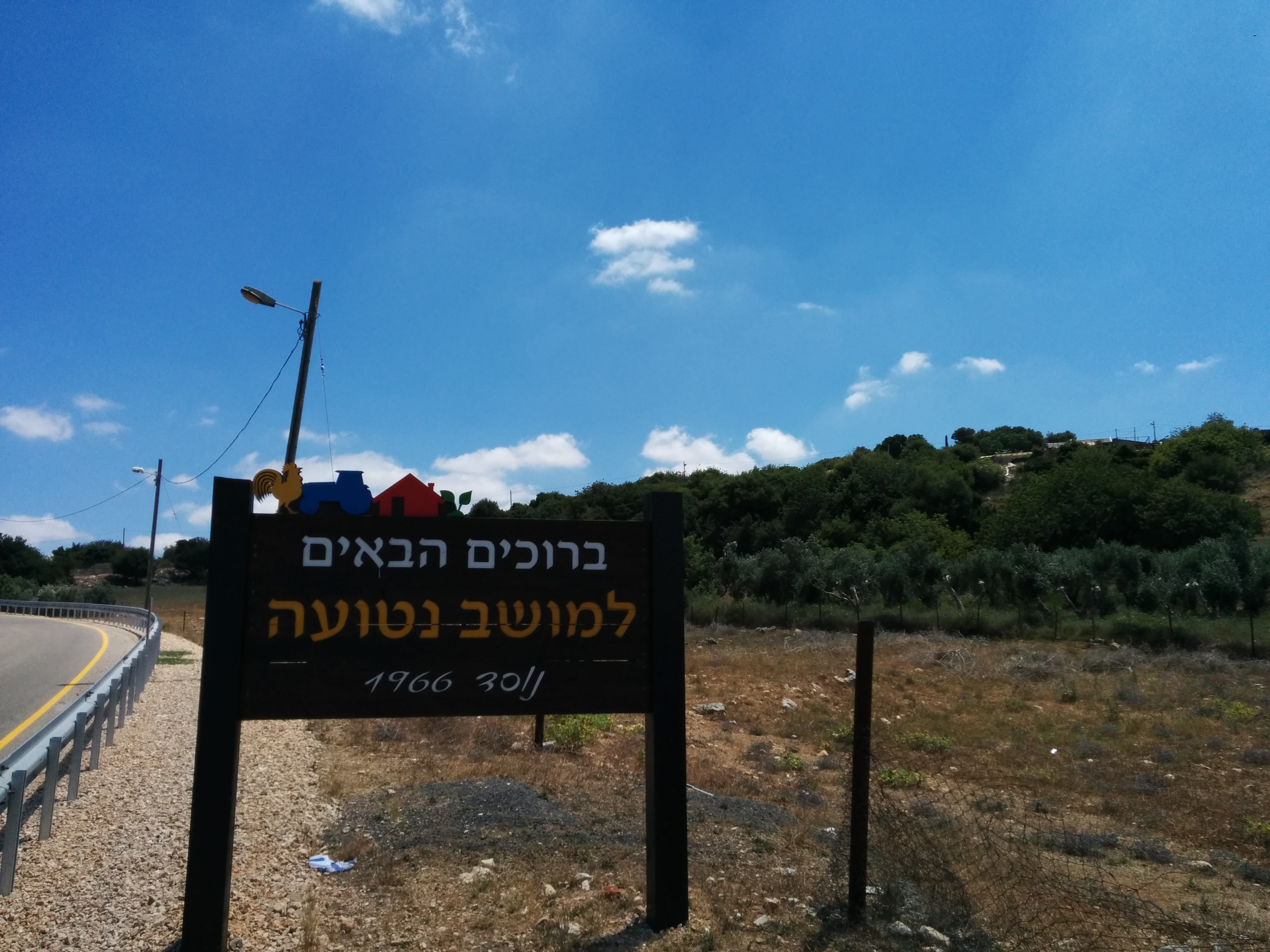
- Etymology: "Planted"
- Location within Northwest Israel Location within Israel
- Coordinates: 33°3′53″N 35°19′22″E
- Country: Israel
- District: Northern
- Subdistrict: Acre
- Council: Ma'ale Yosef
- Affiliation: Moshavim Movement
- Founded: 1966
- Founder: Moshavniks
- Population (2024): 343

Netu'a (Hebrew: נְטוּעָה, lit. 'Planted') is a moshav in northern Israel. Located near the Lebanese border, it falls under the jurisdiction of Ma'ale Yosef Regional Council. In 2024 it had a population of 343.

== History ==
The village was established in 1966 by residents of other local moshavim as part of a plan to encourage more Jewish settlement in the Galilee. It is located on land near the Palestinian villages of Dayr al-Qassi and Al-Mansura, both depopulated in the 1948 Arab–Israeli War.

During the Gaza war, northern Israeli border communities, including Netu'a, faced targeted attacks by Hezbollah and Palestinian factions based in Lebanon, and were evacuated.
