= Acre Subdistrict, Mandatory Palestine =

Administrative division of British Palestine (1920–1948)

Coordinates: 32.5833°N 35.0000°E

Acre Subdistrict قضاء عكا נפת עכו
- Subdistrict of Mandatory Palestine
- 1920–1948
- Capital: Acre
- Area
  - 1945: 799 km^{2} (308 sq mi)
- Population
  - 1904: 31,593
  - 1945: 68,330
- History
  - Established: 1920
  - Disestablished: 1948
Preceded by	Succeeded by
Sanjak of Acre	Israel
- Today part of: Israel

The Acre Subdistrict (Arabic: قضاء عكا, Qadaa Akka; Hebrew: נפת עכו, Nefat Akko) was one of the subdistricts of Mandatory Palestine. It was located in what is now northern Israel, having nearly the same territory as the modern-day Acre County. The city of Acre was the district's capital.

The subdistrict was transformed into Northern District's Acre Subdistrict.

== Borders ==
- Safad Subdistrict (East)
- Tiberias Subdistrict (East)
- Nazareth Subdistrict (South)
- Haifa Subdistrict (South West)
- Lebanon (North)

== History of attachment to a district ==
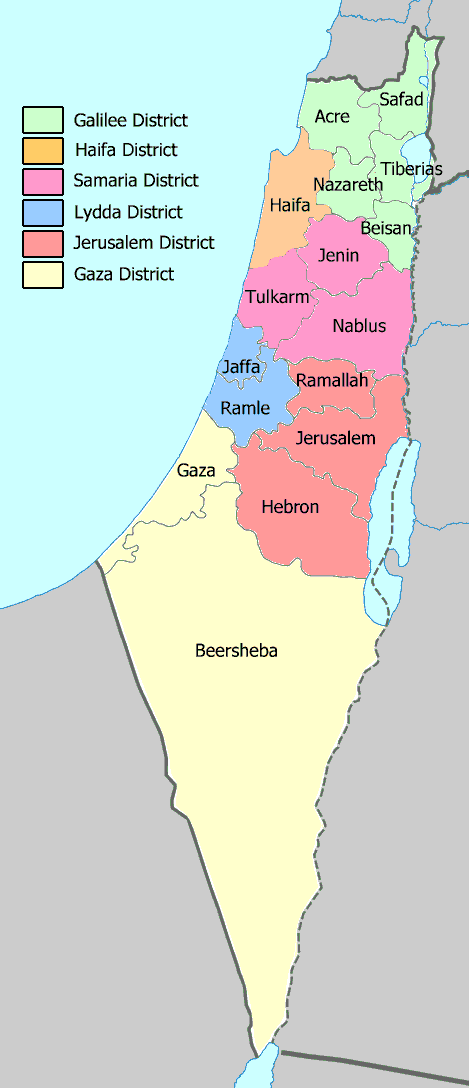
Districts and Sub-Districts of Palestine in 1945.

The layout of the districts of Mandatory Palestine changed several times:

- 1922 Northern District
- 1937 Galilee District
- 1939 Galilee and Acre District
- 1940 Galilee District
- 1948 dissolution

The territory is now covered by the Northern District of Israel.

== Towns and villages ==
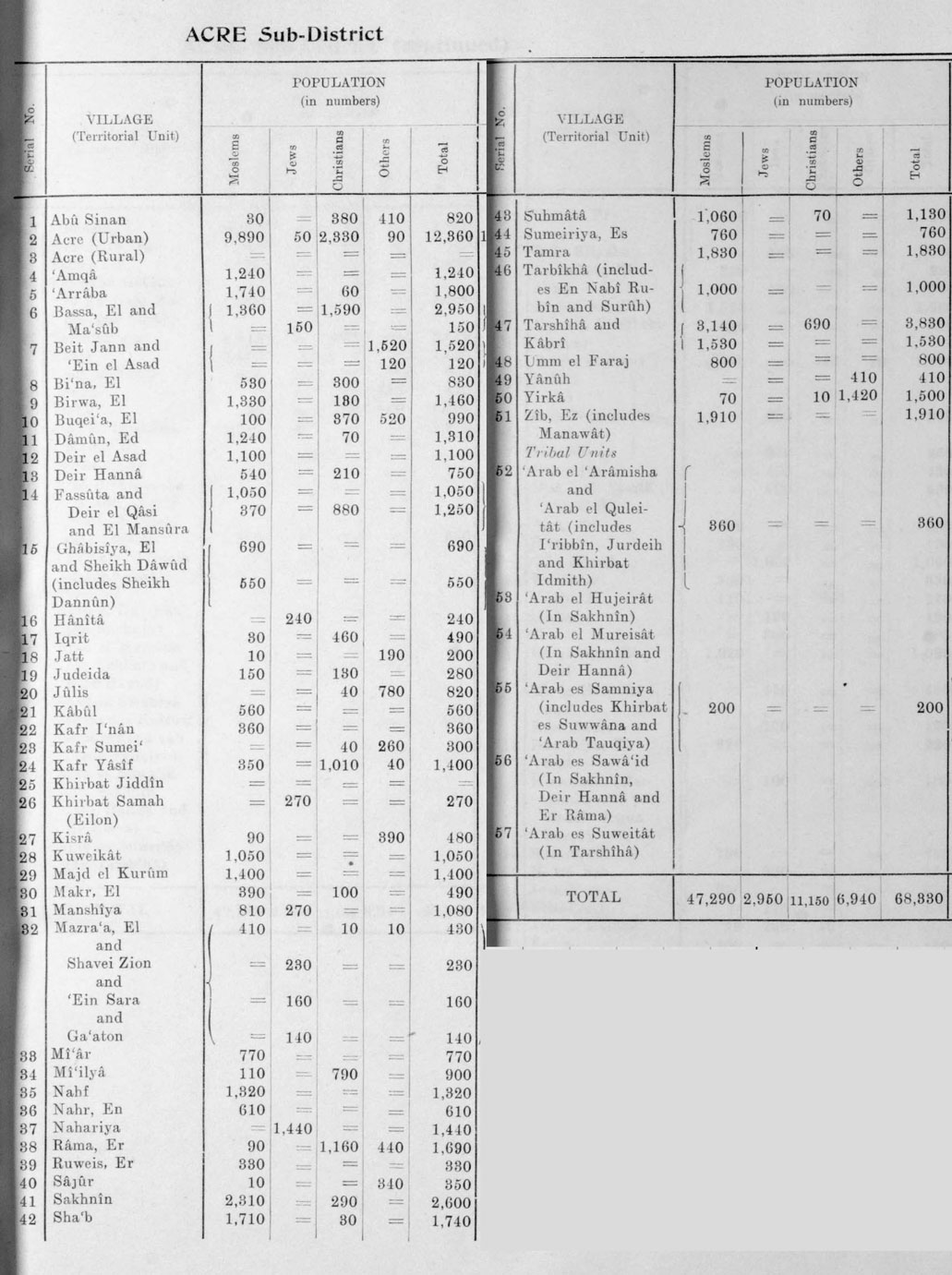
Official population statistics for the sub-district, from Village Statistics, 1945.

Acre Sub-District – Population by Village
Village	Muslims	Jews	Christians	Others	Total
Abu Sinan	30		380	410	820
Acre (Urban)	9,890	50	2,330	90	12,360
Acre (Rural)					
Amqa	1,240				1,240
Arraba	1,740		60		1,800
Bassa (El and Ma'sub)	1,360		1,590		2,950
Ma'sub		150			150
Beit Jann				1,520	1,520
Ein el Asad				120	120
Bi'na (El)	530		300		830
Birwa (El)	1,330		130		1,460
Buqeia (El)	100		370	520	990
Damin (Ed)	1,240		70		1,310
Deir el Asad	1,100				1,100
Deir Hanna	540		210		750
Fassuta	1,050				1,050
Deir el Qasi and El Mansura	370		880		1,250
Ghabisiya (El)	690				690
Sheikh Dawud (incl. Sheikh Dannun)	550				550
Hanita		240			240
Iqrith	30		460		490
Jatt	10			190	200
Judeida	150		130		280
Julis			40	780	820
Kabul	560				560
Kafr I'nan	360				360
Kafr Sumei'			40	260	300
Kafr Yasif	350		1,010	40	1,400
Khirbat Jiddin					
Khirbat Samah (Eilon)		270			270
Kisra	90			390	480
Kuweikat	1,050				1,050
Majd el Kurum	1,400				1,400
Makr (El)	390		100		490
Manshiya	810	270			1,080
Mazra'a (El)	410		10	10	430
Shavei Zion		230			230
Ein Sara		160			160
Gaton		140			140
Mi'ar	770				770
Mi'ilya	110		790		900
Nahf	1,320				1,320
Nahr (En)	610				610
Nahariya		1,440			1,440
Rama (Er)	90		1,160	440	1,690
Ruweis (Er)	330				330
Sajur	10			340	350
Sakhnin	2,310		290		2,600
Sha'b	1,710		30		1,740
Suhmata	1,060		70		1,130
Sumeiriya (Es)	760				760
Tamra	1,830				1,830
Tarbiha (includes En Nabi Rubin and Suruh)	1,000				1,000
Tarshiha	3,140		690		3,830
Kabri	1,530				1,530
Umm el Faraj	800				800
Yanuh				410	410
Yirka	70		10	1,420	1,500
Zib (Ez, includes Manawat)	1,910				1,910
Arab el Aramsha and Arab el Quleitat (includes I'ribbin, Jurdeih and Khirbat Idmith)	360				360
Arab es Samniya (includes Khirbat es Suwwana and Arab Tauqiya)	200				200
TOTAL	47,290	2,950	11,150	6,940	68,330

=== Depopulated towns and villages ===
(current localities in parentheses)

- Amqa (Amka)
- Arab al-Samniyya (Ya'ara)
- al-Bassa (Betzet, Rosh HaNikra, Shlomi, Tzahal)
- al-Birwa (Ahihud, Yas'ur)
- al-Damun (Yas'ur)
- Dayr al-Qassi (Abirim, Elkosh, Mattat, Netu'a)
- al-Ghabisiyya (Netiv HaShayara
- Iqrit (Even Menachem, Goren, Shomera)
- Khirbat Iribbin (Adamit, Goren)
- Khirbat Jiddin (Ga'aton, Qiryat, Yehiam)
- al-Kabri (Ein Ya'akov, Ga'aton, Kabri, Ma'alot-Tarshiha, Me'ona)
- Kafr 'Inan (Kfar Hananya)
- Kuwaykat (Beit HaEmek)
- al-Manshiyya (Bustan HaGalil, Shomrat)
- al-Mansura (Abbirim, Biranit, Elkosh, Mattat, Netu'a)
- Mi'ar (Atzmon, Ya'ad)
- al-Nabi Rubin (Even Menachem, Shomera, Shtula, Zar'it)
- al-Nahr (Ben Ami, (Kabri)
- al-Ruways
- Sha'ab
- Suhmata (Hosen, Tzuriel)
- al-Sumayriyya (Bustan HaGalil, Lohamei HaGeta'ot, Shomrat)
- Suruh (Even Menachem, Shomera, Shtula, Zar'it)
- al-Tall
- Tarbikha (Even Menachem, Shomera, Shtula, Zar'it)
- Umm al-Faraj (Ben Ami)
- Az-Zeeb (Gesher HaZiv, Sa'ar)
