= Iqrit =

Iqrit إقرث (Arabic) Iqreet, Akrith
- Village
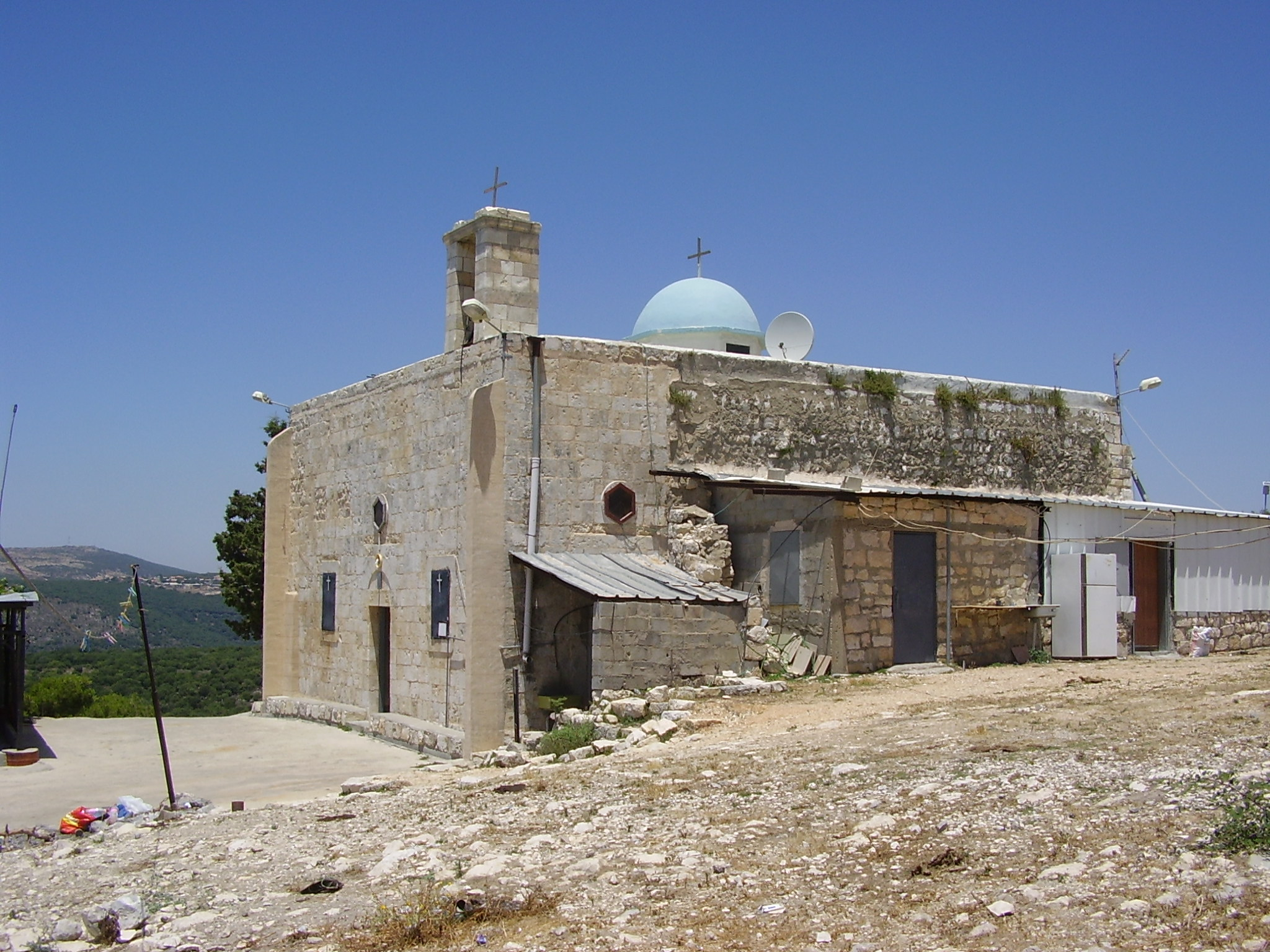
- Saint Mary's Church in Iqrit
- Etymology: from personal name
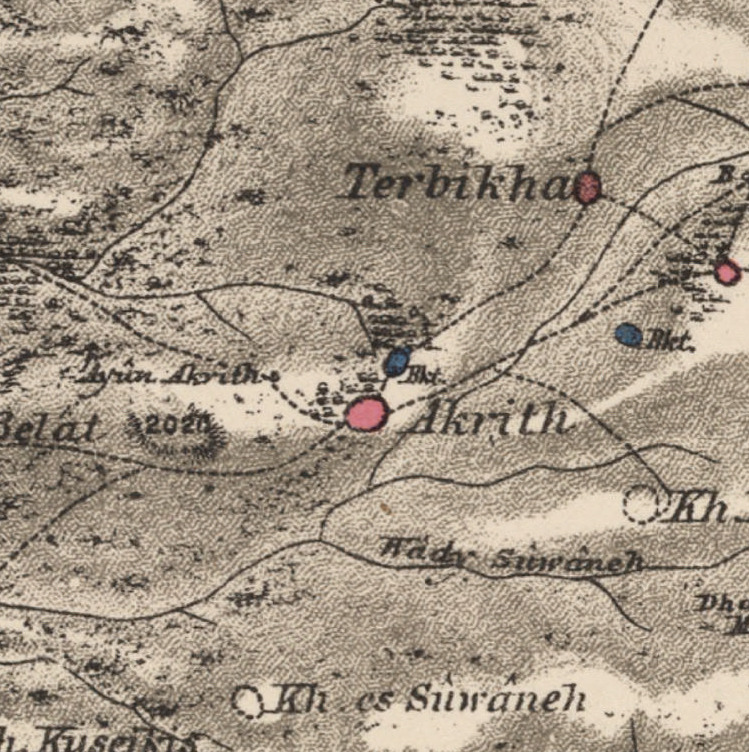
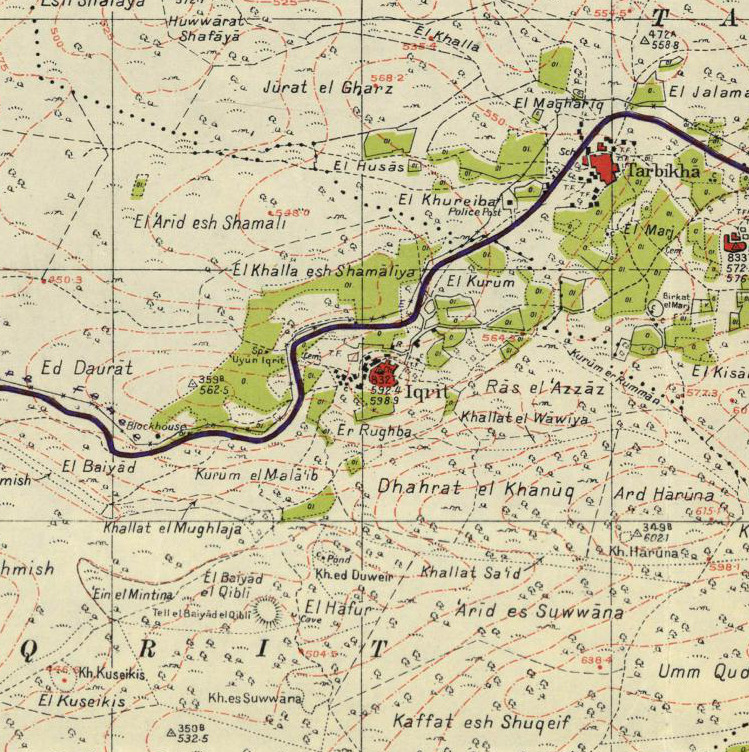
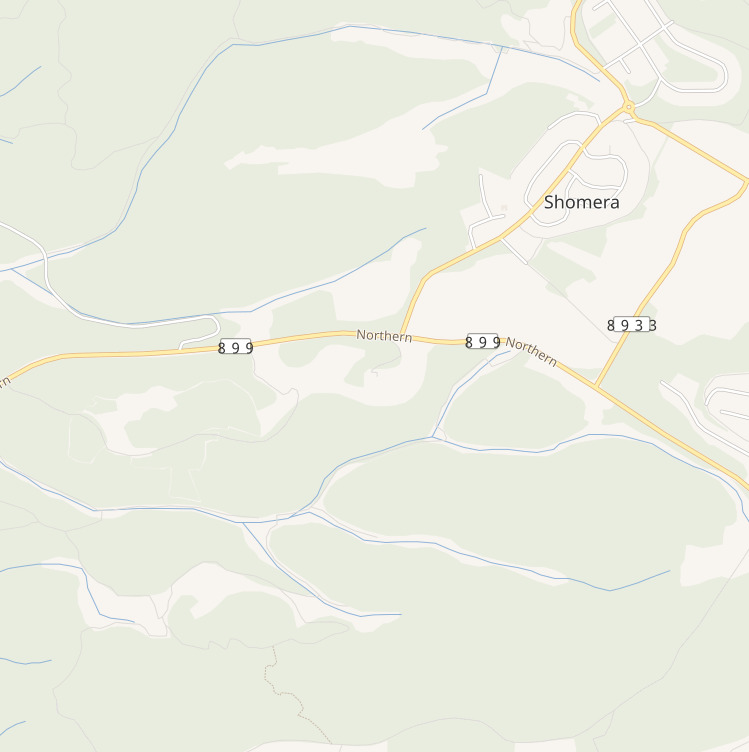
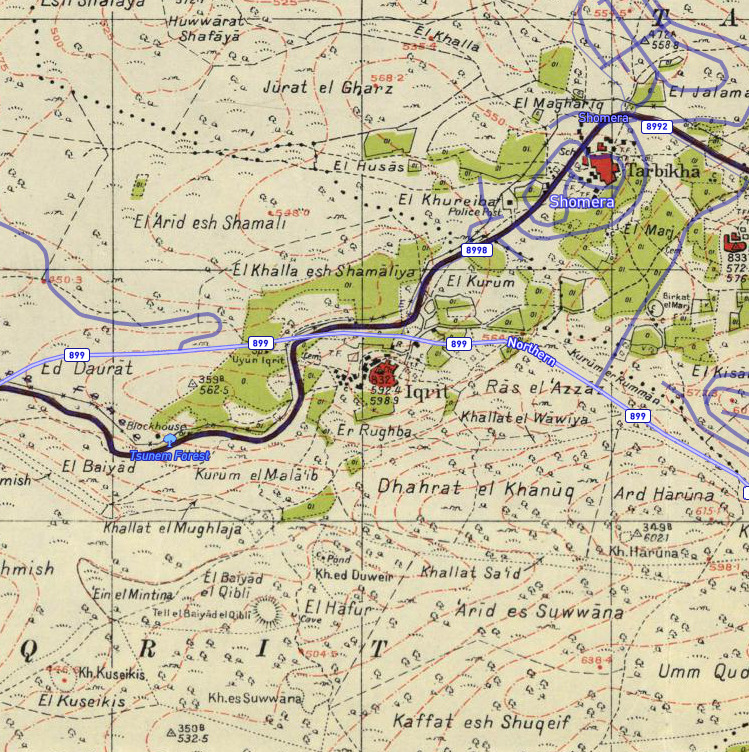
- 1870s map 1940s map modern map 1940s with modern overlay map A series of historical maps of the area around Iqrit (click the buttons)

- Location within Mandatory Palestine
- Coordinates: 33°04′32″N 35°16′31″E
- Palestine grid: 176/275
- Geopolitical entity: Mandatory Palestine
- Subdistrict: Acre
- Date of depopulation: early November 1948

Area
  - Total: 21,711 dunams (21.711 km^{2}; 8.383 sq mi)

Population (1945)
  - Total: 490
- Cause(s) of depopulation: Expulsion by Yishuv forces
- Current Localities: Shomera, Even Menachem, Goren Gornot ha-Galil

Iqrit (Arabic: إقرت or إقرث, Iqrith; sometimes romanized as Ikret) was a Palestinian Christian village, located 25 kilometres (16 miles) northeast of Acre, in the western Galilee. In October 1948, the village's Palestinian Arab inhabitants were expelled by Zionist forces during the 1948 Palestine war, and the territory later became part of the new State of Israel. All of its Palestinian Christian inhabitants were forced to flee to Lebanon or the Israeli village of Rameh, and, despite the promise that they would be returned in two weeks' time, the villagers were not allowed to return, and the Israeli army destroyed the village.

In 1951, in response to a plea from the Iqrit villagers, the Israel Supreme Court had ruled that the former residents of Iqrit be allowed to return to their homes. However, before they could, the IDF, despite awareness of the Supreme Court decision, destroyed Iqrit on Christmas Day 1951. Descendants of the villagers maintain an outpost in the village church, and bury their dead in its cemetery. All attempts to cultivate its lands are uprooted by the Israel Lands Administration.

== History ==
=== Antiquity: archaeological sites ===
The Canaanites erected a statue for the god Melqart of Tyre in the village. The village area contains mosaic floors, remains of a wine press, rock-hewn tombs, cisterns, and granite implements. There are many archaeological sites in Iqrit's vicinity.

Iqrit is identified with Yoqeret or Yokereth (Hebrew: יוקרת) a Jewish village mentioned in the Talmud, homeplace of Jose of Yokereth (Babylonian Talmud, Ta'anit, 23b).

=== Crusader period ===
When the Crusaders occupied Iqrit, they called it Acref. Açref is a name still commonly used for the village among surrounding Bedouin tribes.

=== Ottoman period ===
Incorporated into the Ottoman Empire in 1517 with all of Palestine, Iqrit appeared in the 1596 tax registers as being in the nahiya (subdistrict) of Akka under the Liwa of Safad, with a population of 374 and an economy dependent largely on goats, beehives and agriculture. There was a press used for olives or grapes.

In 1875, Victor Guérin passed by the village and was told that it was "very considerable" and inhabited by Maronites and Greek Orthodox Christians. In 1881, the Palestine Exploration Fund's (PEF) Survey of Western Palestine (SWP) called it Akrith, and described it as a village of stone buildings situated on a tell, with arable land including figs and olives, a modern chapel serving a Christian population of 100, and water supplied by three springs and a dozen rock-cut cisterns.

=== British Mandate ===
Like a number of other villages in the area, Iqrit was linked to the coastal highway from Acre to Ras an-Naqura via a secondary road leading to Tarbikha. There were 339 people living in 50 houses in the census of 1931, which rose to 490 by the 1945 statistics, comprising 460 Christians and 30 Muslims. There was a total of 24,722 dunams (6,109 acres) of land according to an official land and population survey. Of this, 458 dunams were plantations and irrigable land; 1,088 were used for cereals, while 68 dunams were built-up (urban) land.

At the time of their eviction in November 1948, there were 491 citizens in Iqrit, including 432 Melkites (Greek Catholics), inhabiting the entire area of the village. Some of the 59 Muslims of the village rented their homes in Iqrit while others had built houses in esh-Shafaya.

Only part of the village land was cultivated and the rest was covered with oak, laurel and carob trees. By 1948, the village owned about 600 dunams (600,000 m²) of private property with groves of fig trees that served all inhabitants of Iqrit and the surroundings. The groves covered the hill of al-Bayad, and the remaining cultivated land was used for crops of lentils, as well as tobacco and other fruit trees.

The village included a private elementary school administered by the Greek Catholic Archdiocese and a large Melkite (Greek Catholic) church, the latter of which remains standing. There were two natural water springs, and many wells and a large pool for collected rainwater. There were many threshing floors, mainly located between the built-up village lands and the cemetery.

=== 1948 war ===
Villagers and IDF soldiers in Iqrit, 3 November 1948

Iqrit was captured on 31 October 1948 by the Haganah's Oded Brigade during Operation Hiram, an Israeli offensive which advanced on the coastal road towards Lebanon. Iqrit and Tarbikha surrendered and the villagers stayed in their homes.

Iqrit and a number of other villages in the region were soon affected by a policy known as "an Arabless border strip". Six days after its surrender, on 5 November 1948, the Israeli Army ordered the villagers to surrender the village and leave, stating that they would be returned in two weeks' time when the military operations had concluded. Residents departed, anticipating only temporary absence, as had been promised. Some went to Lebanon and the Israeli Army trucked the majority to Rame, a town between Acre and Safad.

According to Israeli historian Benny Morris, the villagers of Iqrit were outright expelled by the Israeli Army in November 1948, together with the villagers of Kafr Bir'im, Nabi Rubin and Tarbikha, "without Cabinet knowledge, debate, or approval – though, almost inevitably, this received post facto Cabinet endorsement." While some of the former inhabitants of Iqrit became refugees in Lebanon, most are now internally displaced Palestinians who are also citizens of Israel.

=== Israel; struggle for return ===
==== 1951 Supreme Court ruling ====
In 1951, Muhammad Nimr al-Hawari brought against Israel the first legal action concerning villagers returning to their homes. This was on behalf of 5 men who were Iqrit villagers and Israeli citizens. On 31 July 1951, the Israeli courts recognised the rights of the villagers to their land and their right to return to it. The court said the land was not abandoned and therefore could not be placed under the Custodian of Absentee Property.

In July 1951, the villagers of Iqrit pleaded their case before Israel's Supreme Court, and the court ruled in favour of the right to return to their village, "as long as no emergency decree" against it has been issued. After this judgement, the military government immediately issued such a decree against the Ikrit evacuees. The villagers appealed to the Supreme Court again and were scheduled to have their case considered on 6 February 1952.

==== IDF razes Iqrit ====
Two months after the Israeli High Court had rules in favour of the Ikrit residents, on Christmas Day 1951, Israel Defense Forces (IDF) destroyed the village, including its residences and churches. According to the Washington Report on Middle East Affairs, Israeli soldiers took the village chief of Iqrit to the top of a nearby hill to force him to watch as Israeli troops conducted explosive demolition of each house in the village.

==== 1952 verdict and expropriation ====
In its third verdict, in February 1952, the court blamed the villagers for depending on promises from the military ruler of Galilee, instead of benefiting from the legal remedy which was given to them by the court in its first relevant verdict. In 1955, 16,000 dunam in Ikrit was expropriated for establishing Jewish settlements. The expropriation was justified by "a sickening claim that nobody had lived in them for two years", according to Zehava Galon.

==== Return attempts: 1970s–2010 ====
In the 1970s, villagers from Iqrit conducted a series of sit-ins in the village's former church over a period of six years, and the case of Iqrit (and of Kafr Bir'im) was frequently covered by the Israeli media. Several prominent Israeli cultural and artistic figures supported the movement to repatriate the Iqrit villagers and public empathy for their plight was widespread. While the Israeli authorities recognized the villagers' right to return in principle, officials resisted implementing this right. In 1972, Israeli Prime Minister Golda Meir stated:

It is not only consideration of security [that prevents] an official decision regarding Bi'rim and Iqrit, but the desire to avoid [setting] a precedent. We cannot allow ourselves to become more and more entangled and to reach a point from which we are unable to extricate ourselves.

Meron Benvenisti noted in 2000 how it has been argued that the villagers of Iqrit and Bi'rim are not the only present absentees in Israel, and therefore recognizing their right of return is perceived as setting a "dangerous precedent" that would be followed by similar demands from other displaced persons. However, Benvenisti argued in 2008 that it could be a positive precedent if the Iqrit villagers were to be allocated the small amount of empty land they need to establish a community settlement on their own land.

In 2003, some of Iqrit's villagers repetitioned the Supreme Court so as to facilitate their return to Iqrit, but the petition was rejected by the court.

==== Since 2010 ====
In August 2012, a large demonstration was held in the city of Haifa demanding Israel to grant the descendants of villagers from Iqrit and Kafr Bir'im the right of return to the respective villages. Since the last Roots Camp In 2012, a group of the village's youth decided to stay in the village and conduct their lives as regular villagers; this came as an act of opposition to the Israeli government's continued dismissal of the case.

In 2013, Gideon Levy and Alex Levac noted that "third-generation refugees − 15 young people − have established an outpost in the village church; they have been living here, under the radar, for more than a year."

Iqrit is among the demolished Palestinian villages for which commemorative Marches of Return have taken place, such as those organized by the Association for the Defence of the Rights of the Internally Displaced.

Ahead of Pope Francis visit to the region in 2014 the Iqrit villagers sent him a letter asking him to pressure Israel to allow them to return. At the same time, inspectors from the Israel Land Administration uprooted newly planted trees and confiscated equipment used by villagers staying in Iqrit.

In April 2015 the elders of Iqrit congregated with the younger generations in the old Church of St. Mary for Easter Monday Mass. Aymen Odeh, a Knesset member and a longtime supporter of the villagers and said it was time to take the case outside the village. "We need demonstrations in public squares and in front of the Knesset", he said.

== Within the Arab–Israeli conflict ==
=== 1972 Munich massacre ===
The operational name of the Munich massacre of Israeli athletes in 1972 was named by its perpetrators, the Black September Organization, "Iqrit and Bir'im", after the two Galilean villages.

=== 2023 war incident ===
On 26 December 2023, during the Gaza war, an anti-tank missile shot by Hezbollah fighters from Lebanon damaged a shed in the Iqrit church compound, but not the church itself. The civilian man in his 80s who was guarding the church suffered moderate wounds. As IDF troops and medical services were working to evacuate him, they were hit by further missiles, which resulted in nine soldiers being wounded, one of them seriously.

== Present buildings and land use ==
=== Israeli villages ===
Following the war, the area was incorporated into the State of Israel and a number of new Jewish villages were established there, two of them partially on Iqrit's land: Shomera (1949; built mainly on the ruins of Tarbikha), and Even Menachem (1960). Gornot HaGalil (1980) followed nearby. At the western entrance of Iqrit, there is now a cowshed that belongs to the moshav of Shomera.

=== Iqrit vestiges ===
The Melkite Greek Catholic church is the only building of Iqrit which remains standing. The fenced cemetery is annually maintained, on the road to the north. Uncleared rubble from the destroyed houses remains and there are overgrown fig, grape, almond, and olive orchards.

== Gallery ==
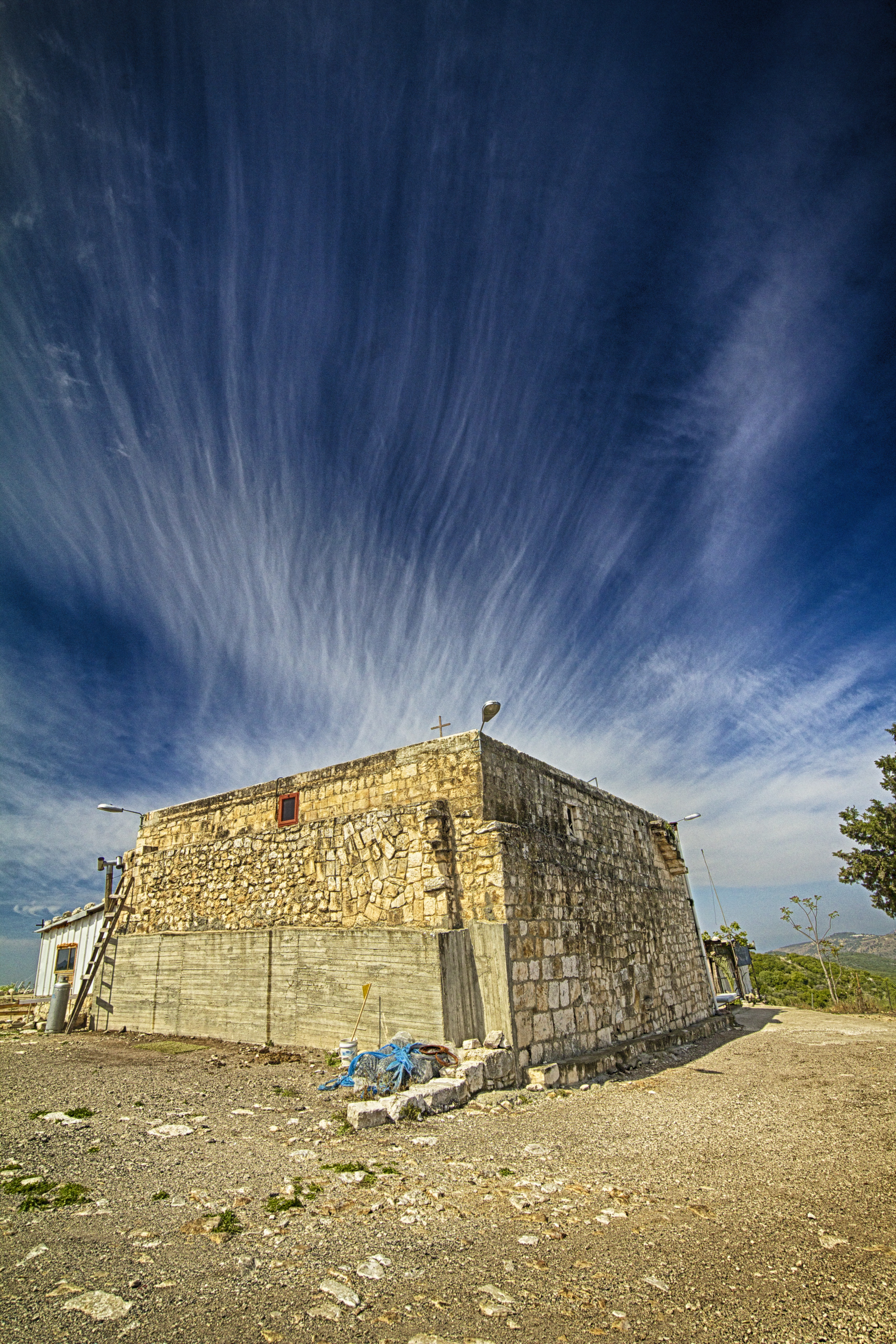

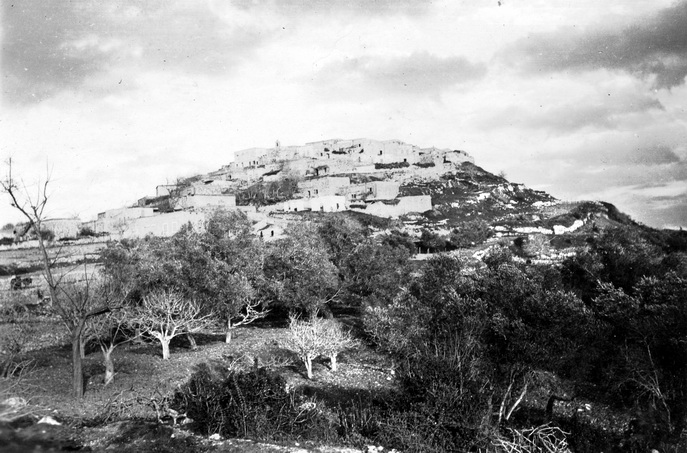
Iqrit 1939

== See also ==
- Depopulated Palestinian locations in Israel

== Bibliography ==
- Barron, J. B., ed. (1923). Palestine: Report and General Abstracts of the Census of 1922. Government of Palestine.
- Benveniśtî, M. (2000). Sacred landscape: the buried history of the Holy Land since 1948. University of California Press. ISBN 978-0-520-23422-2.
- Black, I.; B. Morris (1991). Israel's secret wars: a history of Israel's intelligence services. Grove Weidenfeld. p. 1. ISBN 0-8021-1159-9.
- Conder, C.R.; Kitchener, H.H. (1881). The Survey of Western Palestine: Memoirs of the Topography, Orography, Hydrography, and Archaeology. Vol. 1. London: Committee of the Palestine Exploration Fund.
- Dauphin, C. (1998). La Palestine byzantine, Peuplement et Populations. BAR International Series 726 (in French). Vol. III : Catalogue. Oxford: Archeopress. ISBN 0-860549-05-4.
- Department of Statistics (1945). Village Statistics, April, 1945. Government of Palestine.
- Guérin, V. (1880). Description Géographique Historique et Archéologique de la Palestine (in French). Vol. 3: Galilee, pt. 2. Paris: L'Imprimerie Nationale.
- Hadawi, S. (1970). Village Statistics of 1945: A Classification of Land and Area ownership in Palestine. Palestine Liberation Organization Research Center.
- Hütteroth, W.-D.; Abdulfattah, K. (1977). Historical Geography of Palestine, Transjordan and Southern Syria in the Late 16th Century. Erlanger Geographische Arbeiten, Sonderband 5. Erlangen, Germany: Vorstand der Fränkischen Geographischen Gesellschaft. ISBN 3-920405-41-2.
- Khalidi, W. (1992). All That Remains: The Palestinian Villages Occupied and Depopulated by Israel in 1948. Washington D.C.: Institute for Palestine Studies. ISBN 0-88728-224-5.
- Mills, E., ed. (1932). Census of Palestine 1931. Population of Villages, Towns and Administrative Areas. Jerusalem: Government of Palestine.
- Morris, B. (2004). The Birth of the Palestinian Refugee Problem Revisited. Cambridge University Press. ISBN 0-521-00967-7.
- Jiryis, S. (1976). The Arabs in Israel. With a foreword by Noam Chomsky (First English ed.). Beirut: Institute for Palestine Studies. ISBN 0-85345-377-2. chapter 4
- Palmer, E.H. (1881). The Survey of Western Palestine: Arabic and English Name Lists Collected During the Survey by Lieutenants Conder and Kitchener, R. E. Transliterated and Explained by E.H. Palmer. Committee of the Palestine Exploration Fund.
- Rhode, H. (1979). Administration and Population of the Sancak of Safed in the Sixteenth Century. Columbia University. Archived from the original on 1 March 2020.
