= Al-Nabi Rubin, Acre =

al-Nabi Rubin النبي روبين an-Nabi Rubin, Neby Rubin
- Etymology: The prophet Rubin
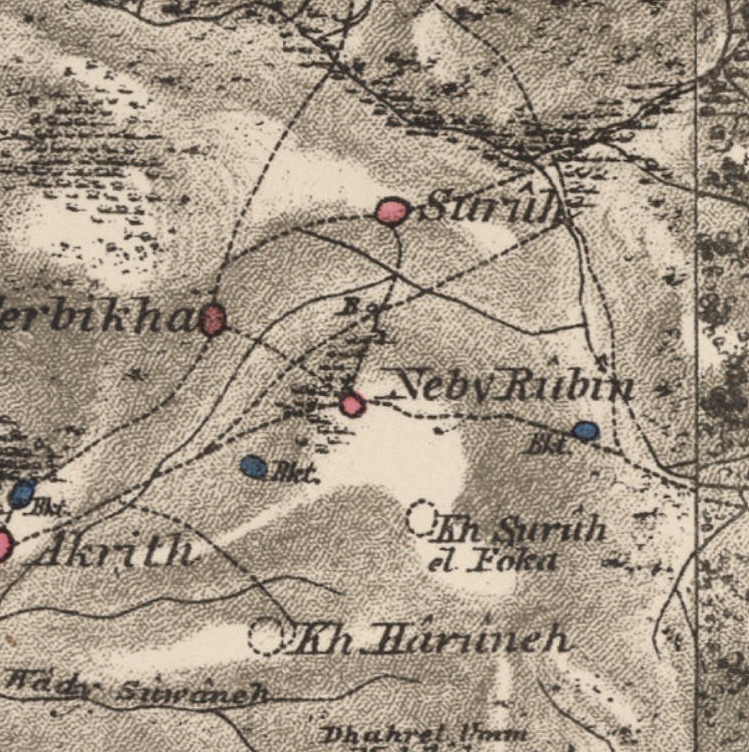
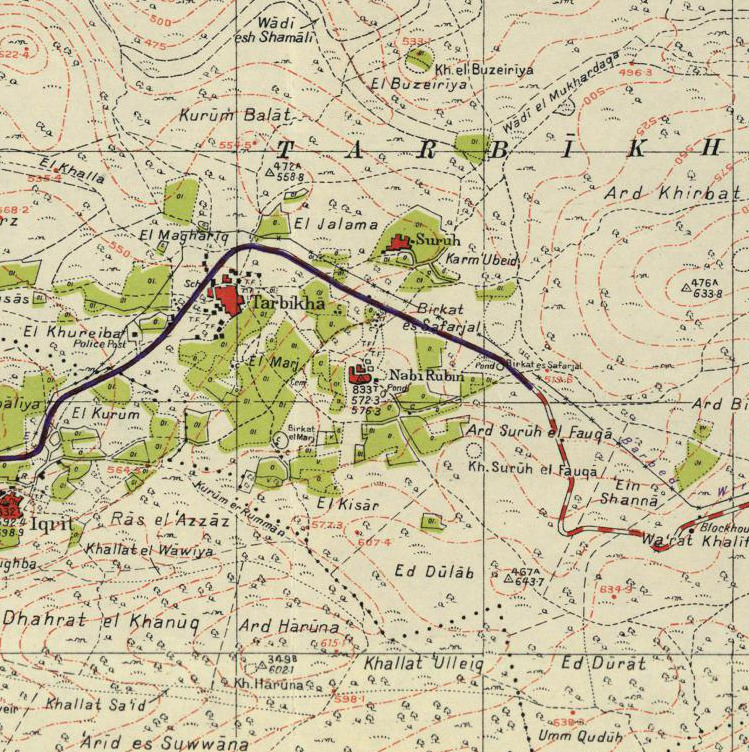
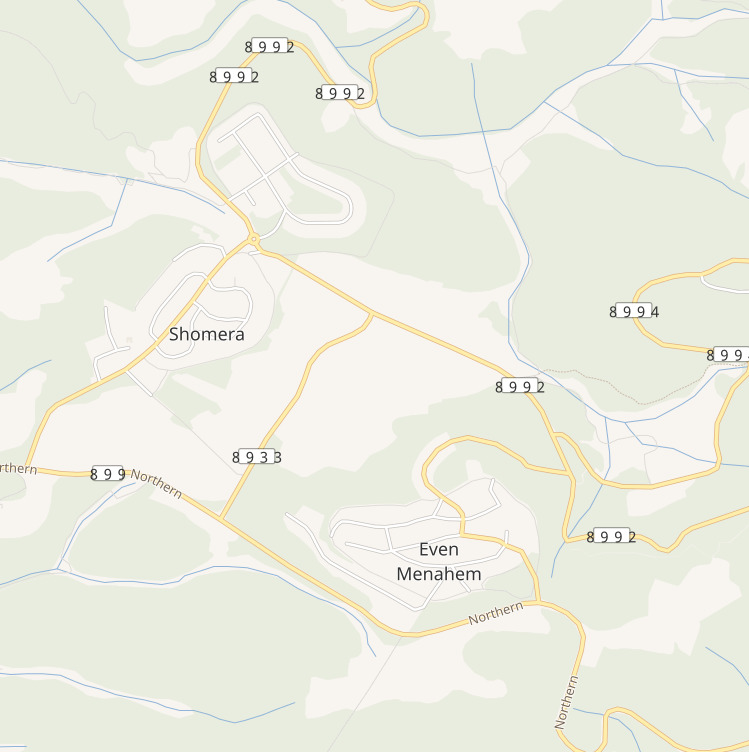
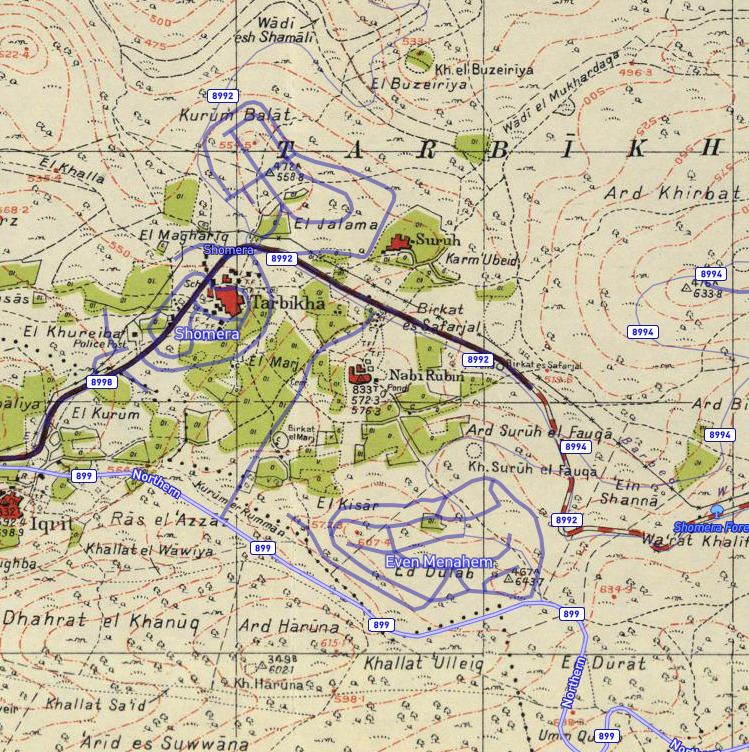
- 1870s map 1940s map modern map 1940s with modern overlay map A series of historical maps of the area around Al-Nabi Rubin, Acre (click the buttons)

- Location within Mandatory Palestine
- Coordinates: 33°04′49″N 35°17′29″E
- Palestine grid: 177/276
- Geopolitical entity: Mandatory Palestine
- Subdistrict: Acre
- Date of depopulation: early November 1948

Area
  - Total: 18.6 km^{2} (7.2 sq mi)

Population (1945)
  - Total: 1,000 with Tarbikha and Suruh
- Cause(s) of depopulation: Expulsion by Yishuv forces
- Current Localities: Shomera, Even Menachem, Zar'it, Shtula

Al-Nabi Rubin (Arabic: النبي روبين, literally "Prophet Rubin" or "Prophet Reuben"), was a Palestinian village located 28 kilometers northeast of Acre. Al-Nabi Rubin students used to attend school in the nearby village of Tarbikha.

== History ==
=== Ottoman era ===
In 1881, the PEF's Survey of Western Palestine (SWP) described Al-Nabi Rubin: This is a small village round the tomb of the Neby, containing about ninety Moslems, it is situated on a prominent top, and surrounded by many olives, a few figs and arable land; there are two cisterns and a birket near.

=== British rule ===
In the 1945 statistics the population Tarbikha, Suruh and Al-Nabi Rubin together was 1000 Muslims according to an official land and population survey, all were Muslims, and they had a total of 18,563 dunams of land. 619 dunams were plantations and irrigable land, 3,204 used for cereals, while 112 dunams were built-up (urban) land.

=== Israeli period ===
IDF soldiers during Operation Hiram, as photographed in Sa'sa' on 30 October 1948

The village was captured by Israel as a result of the Haganah's offensive, Operation Hiram during the 1948 Arab-Israeli War and was mostly destroyed with the exception of its shrine. Al-Nabi Rubin inhabitants were expelled to Lebanon in two waves, the aged and infirm were the last to depart when the IDF trucked them to the Lebanese border.

A shrine thought to be dedicated to the prophet Rubin is the only original structure that remains on former village's lands.

== See also ==
- Depopulated Palestinian locations in Israel

== Bibliography ==
- Conder, C.R.; Kitchener, H.H. (1881). The Survey of Western Palestine: Memoirs of the Topography, Orography, Hydrography, and Archaeology. Vol. 1. London: Committee of the Palestine Exploration Fund.
- Department of Statistics (1945). Village Statistics, April, 1945. Government of Palestine.
- Hadawi, S. (1970). Village Statistics of 1945: A Classification of Land and Area ownership in Palestine. Palestine Liberation Organization Research Center. Archived from the original on 2018-12-08.
- Khalidi, W. (1992). All That Remains: The Palestinian Villages Occupied and Depopulated by Israel in 1948. Washington D.C.: Institute for Palestine Studies. ISBN 0-88728-224-5.
- Morris, B. (2004). The Birth of the Palestinian Refugee Problem Revisited. Cambridge University Press. ISBN 978-0-521-00967-6.
- Palmer, E.H. (1881). The Survey of Western Palestine: Arabic and English Name Lists Collected During the Survey by Lieutenants Conder and Kitchener, R. E. Transliterated and Explained by E.H. Palmer. Committee of the Palestine Exploration Fund.
