= Arab al-Samniyya =

Arab al-Samniyya عرب السمنية Arab al-Samniya
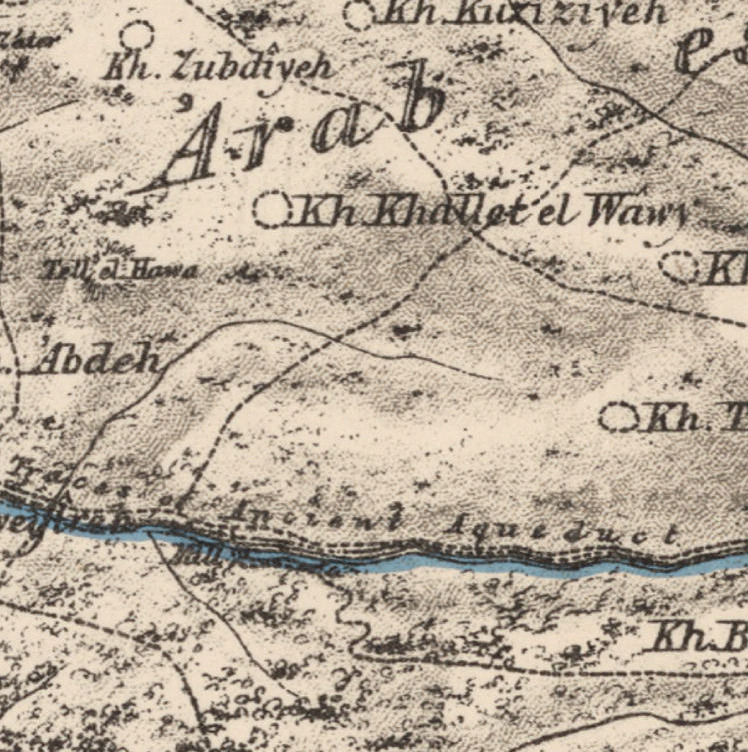
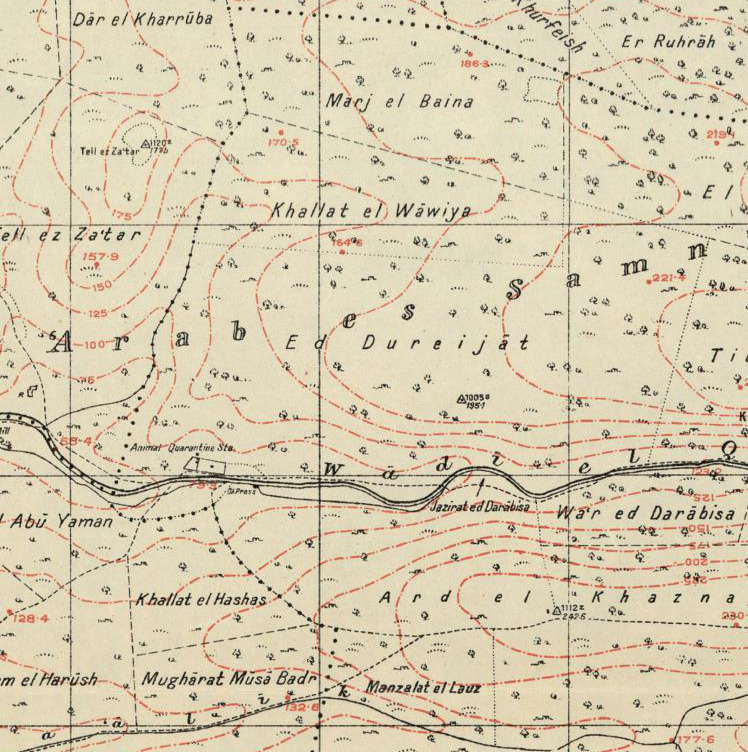
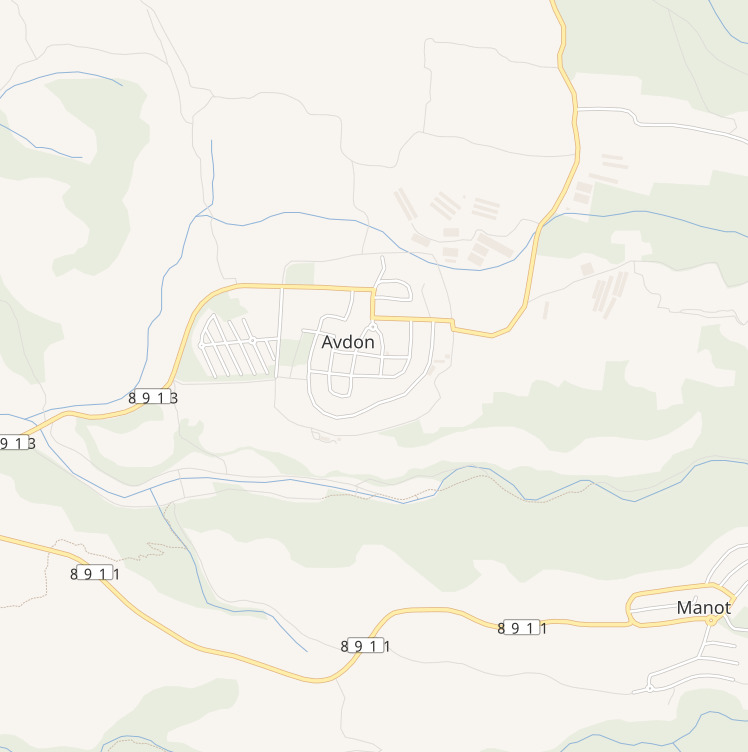
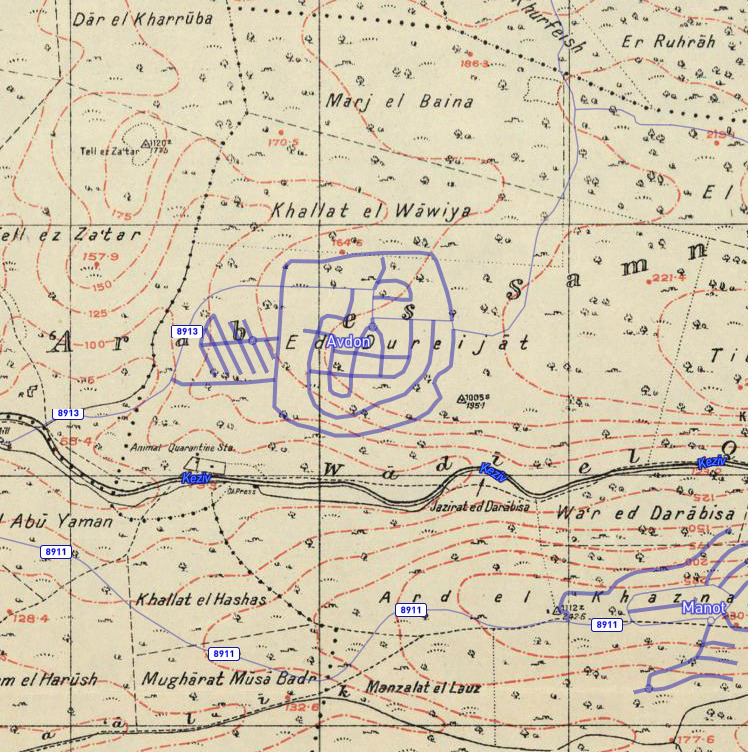
- 1870s map 1940s map modern map 1940s with modern overlay map A series of historical maps of the area around Arab al-Samniyya (click the buttons)

- Location within Mandatory Palestine
- Coordinates: 33°02′48″N 35°10′50″E
- Palestine grid: 165/272
- Geopolitical entity: Mandatory Palestine
- Subdistrict: Acre
- Date of depopulation: 31 October 1948

Area
  - Total: 1.872 km^{2} (0.723 sq mi)

Population (1945)
  - Total: 200
- Cause(s) of depopulation: Military assault by Yishuv forces
- Current Localities: Ya'ara

Arab al-Samniyya (Arabic: عرب السمنية), also known as Khirbat al-Suwwana, was a Palestinian village in the Western Galilee that was captured and depopulated by Israel during the 1948 Arab-Israeli war. It was located in the Acre District of the British Mandate of Palestine, 19.5 km northeast of the city of Acre. In 1945 the, village had a population of 200 Arab and a total land area of 1,872 dunums.

== History ==
Arab al-Samniyya, also known as Khirbat al-Suwwana, was situated on a rocky hill near the road linking Ra's al-Naqura with Safad. Its houses were made of stone. A dirt path linked it to the coastal highway and thence to Acre. The villagers cultivated grain, figs, and olives.

Thirteen houses existed in Arab al-Samniyya in 1931. In the 1945 statistics it had a population of 200 people, including the population of Arab Tawqiyya, with 1,872 dunams of land. Of this, a total of 174 dunams were allocated to grain crops and 22 dunums were irrigated and planted with orchards.

IDF soldiers during Operation Hiram, photographed at Sa'sa', Palestine, 30 October 1948.

Walid Khalidi believes that the village was most likely captured by the Oded Brigade of the Israeli Defense Force at the end of Operation Hiram in October 1948. The people of al-Samniyaa were expelled in the following weeks in order to create a secure border for Israel.

The village was completely destroyed and only building rubble left behind. Following the war the area was incorporated into the State of Israel and the village remained depopulated of its inhabitants. In 1950, the moshav of Ya'ara was established on the land of Arab al-Samniyya.

== See also ==
- Depopulated Palestinian locations in Israel

== Works cited ==
- Khalidi, Walid, ed. (1992). All That Remains: The Palestinian Villages Occupied and Depopulated by Israel in 1948. Institute for Palestine Studies. ISBN 9780887283062.

== Bibliography ==
- Department of Statistics (1945). Village Statistics, April, 1945. Government of Palestine.
- Hadawi, S. (1970). Village Statistics of 1945: A Classification of Land and Area ownership in Palestine. Palestine Liberation Organization Research Center.
- Morris, B. (2004). The Birth of the Palestinian Refugee Problem Revisited. Cambridge University Press. ISBN 978-0-521-00967-6.
