= Suruh =

Suruh سروح
- Village
- Etymology: personal name, possibly from "to flow freely" (water) or "to pasture at large" (cattle)
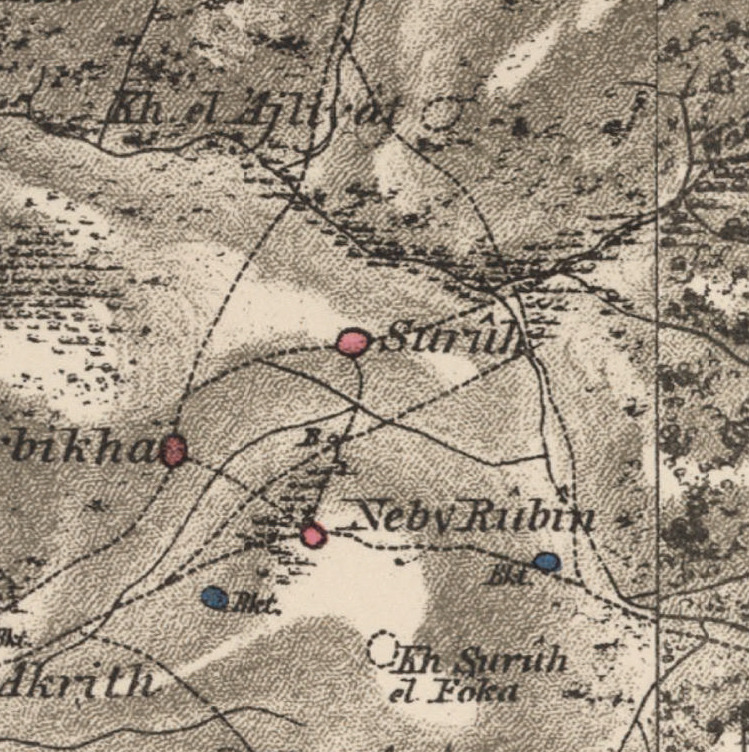
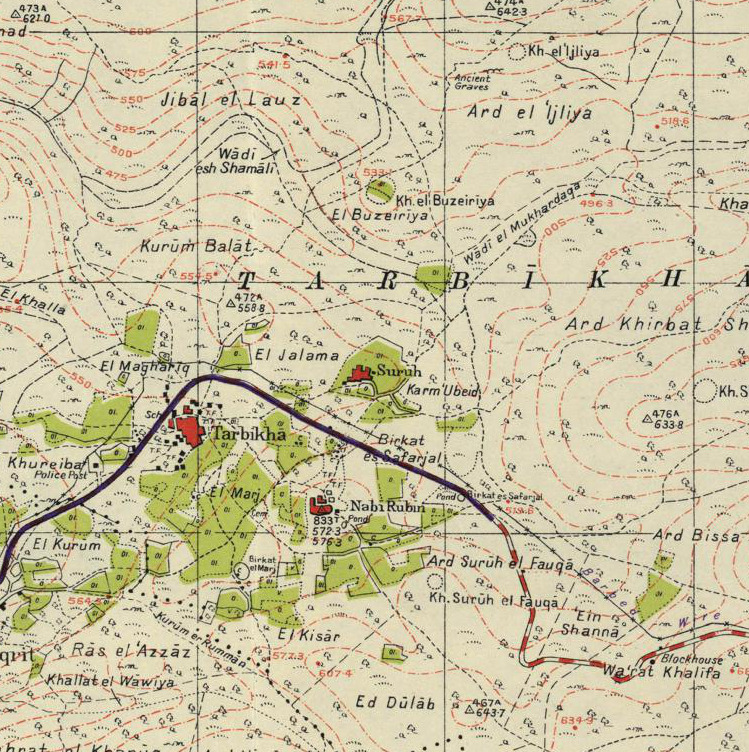
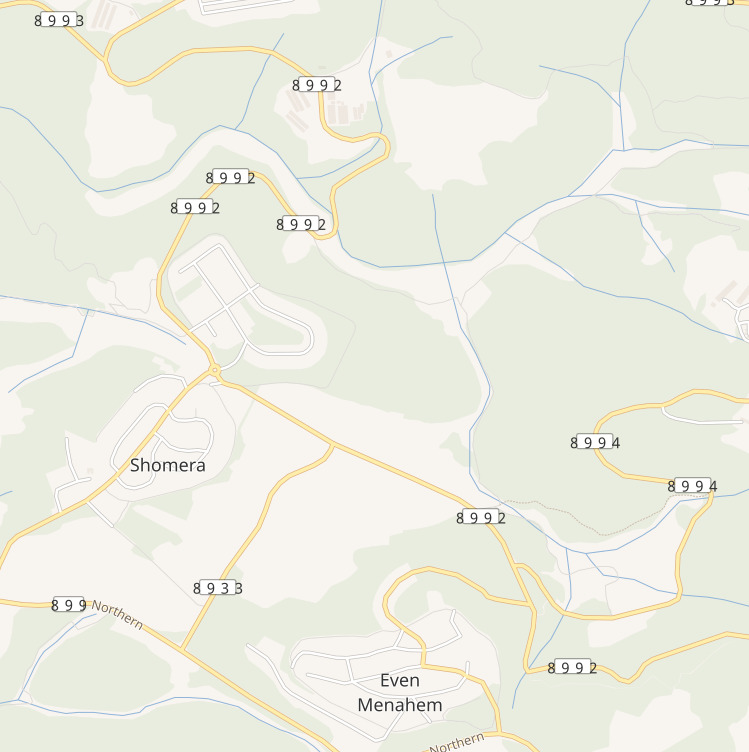
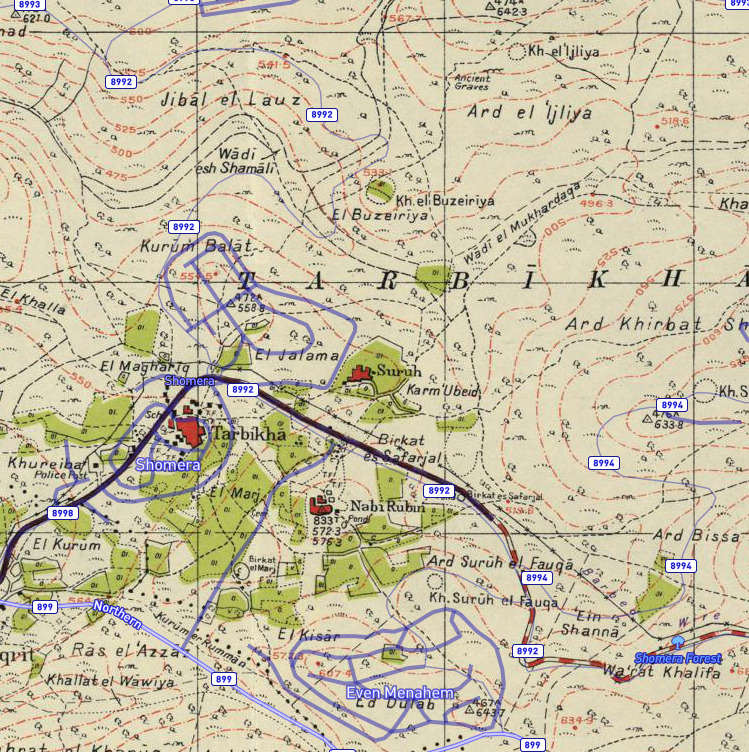
- 1870s map 1940s map modern map 1940s with modern overlay map A series of historical maps of the area around Suruh (click the buttons)

- Location within Mandatory Palestine
- Coordinates: 33°05′06″N 35°17′35″E
- Palestine grid: 177/276
- Geopolitical entity: Mandatory Palestine
- Subdistrict: Acre
- Date of depopulation: early November 1948

Area
  - Total: 18,563 dunams (18.563 km^{2}; 7.167 sq mi)

Population (1945)
  - Total: 1,000
- Cause(s) of depopulation: Expulsion by Yishuv forces
- Current Localities: Shomera, Even Menachem, Kefar Rosenwald, Shtula

Suruh (Arabic: سروح), was a Palestinian Arab hamlet, located 28.5 kilometers (17.7 mi) northeast of Acre. It became depopulated in the 1948 Arab-Israeli war.

== History ==
Suruh contained two khirbats ("sites of ruins") with a variety of ancient artifacts, including cisterns, and rock-hewn tombs.

=== Ottoman era ===
An 1875 visitor, Victor Guérin, describes it as a ruin, which he called Khurbet Seroueh. Guérin noted; "These ruins cover the summit of the hill. At the highest point we observed the remains of a very ancient square tower, measuring fourteen paces on each side, the lower courses consisting of very large blocks, roughly squared and without cement. The interior is full of similar blocks, piled up in confusion, in the midst of which terebinths and pomegranates have taken root. Near this tower a few old houses served as an asylum to four families of Metawileh. On the lintel of the door of one of these houses a square cross inscribed in a circle can still be traced. The terraces of another house are supported in the interior by arched arcades in good cut stone of Roman, or at least Byzantine, date. There are also the remains of numerous houses which have been destroyed, a dozen cisterns cut in the rock, a column lying on the ground, and the fragment of a sarcophagus."

In 1881, the PEF's Survey of Western Palestine (SWP) described Suruh as "a small village, containing about ninety Moslems, situated on a ridge, with olives and arable land round; there are three rock-cut cisterns. The residents lived by agriculture and raising live-stock.

=== British Mandate era ===
In the 1945 statistics the population Tarbikha, Al-Nabi Rubin and Suruh together was 1000 Muslims, and they had a total of 18,563 dunams of land. 619 dunams were plantations and irrigable land, 3,204 used for cereals, while 112 dunams were built-up (urban) land.

=== 1948, and aftermath ===
During the 1948 Arab-Israeli war, the inhabitants of Suruh, the neighbouring hamlet of Nabi Rubin and the main village of Tarbikha, were given expulsion orders by Israeli forces. A predominantly Sunni Muslim hamlet, Suruh and Nabi Rubin were satellite hamlets of Tarbikha, a largely Shi'ite village. Most of Suruh's inhabitants and those the neighbouring localities ended up leaving to Lebanon.

In 1992 the village site was described: "Only rubble, trees, cactuses, shrubs, and weeds are visible. Most of the site is used for grazing."

== See also ==
- Depopulated Palestinian locations in Israel

== Bibliography ==
- Conder, C.R.; Kitchener, H.H. (1881). The Survey of Western Palestine: Memoirs of the Topography, Orography, Hydrography, and Archaeology. Vol. 1. London: Committee of the Palestine Exploration Fund.
- Department of Statistics (1945). Village Statistics, April, 1945. Government of Palestine.
- Guérin, V. (1880). Description Géographique Historique et Archéologique de la Palestine (in French). Vol. 3: Galilee, pt. 2. Paris: L'Imprimerie Nationale.
- Hadawi, S. (1970). Village Statistics of 1945: A Classification of Land and Area ownership in Palestine. Palestine Liberation Organization Research Center.
- Khalidi, W. (1992). All That Remains: The Palestinian Villages Occupied and Depopulated by Israel in 1948. Washington D.C.: Institute for Palestine Studies. ISBN 0-88728-224-5.
- Morris, B. (2004). The Birth of the Palestinian Refugee Problem Revisited. Cambridge University Press. ISBN 978-0-521-00967-6.
- Palmer, E.H. (1881). The Survey of Western Palestine: Arabic and English Name Lists Collected During the Survey by Lieutenants Conder and Kitchener, R. E. Transliterated and Explained by E.H. Palmer. Committee of the Palestine Exploration Fund.
