= Khirbat Iribbin =

Khirbat Iribbin خربة عربين Iribbin, Khirbat
- Village
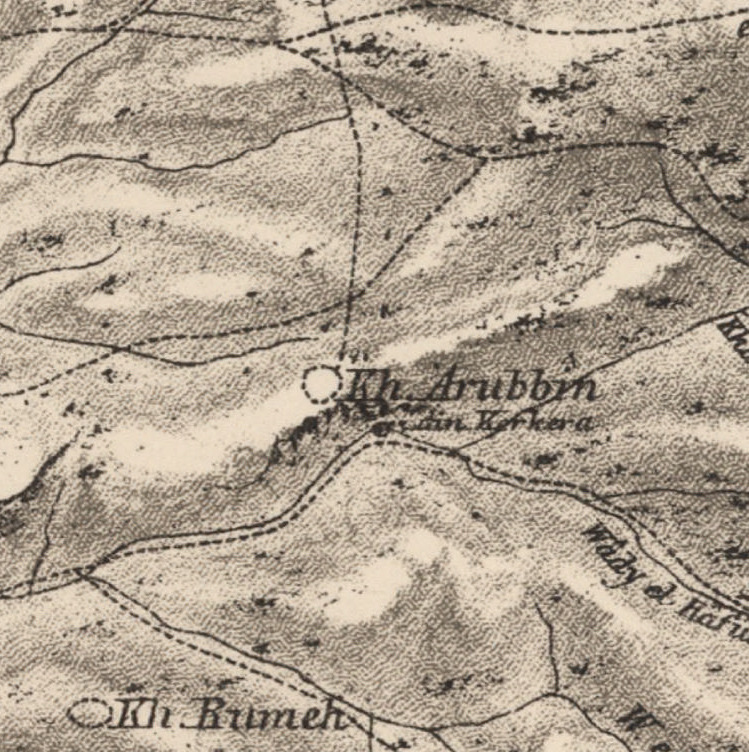
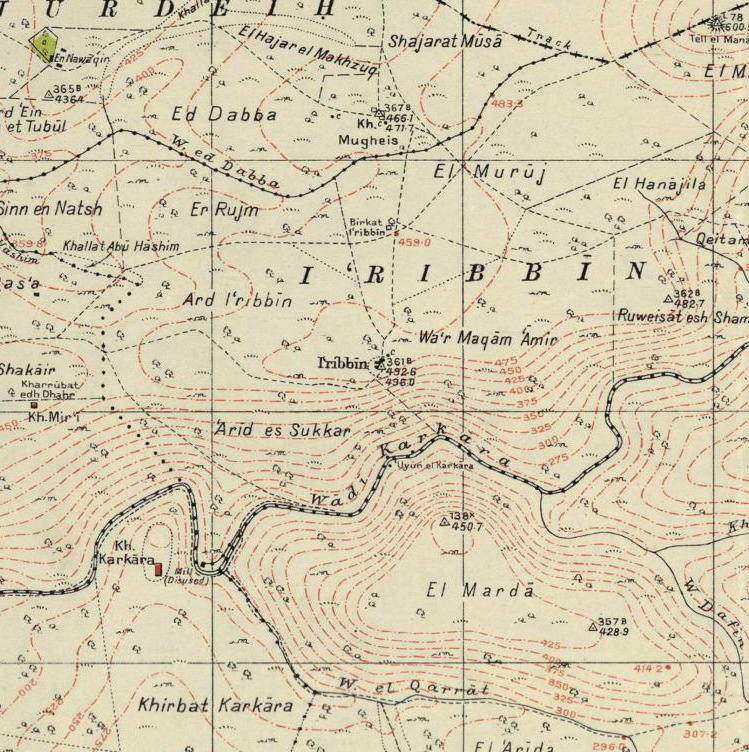
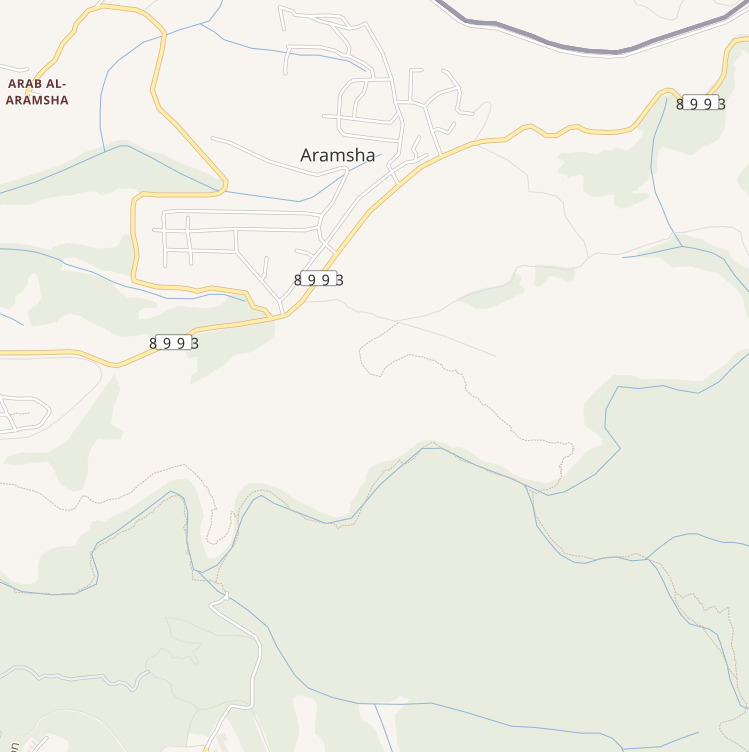
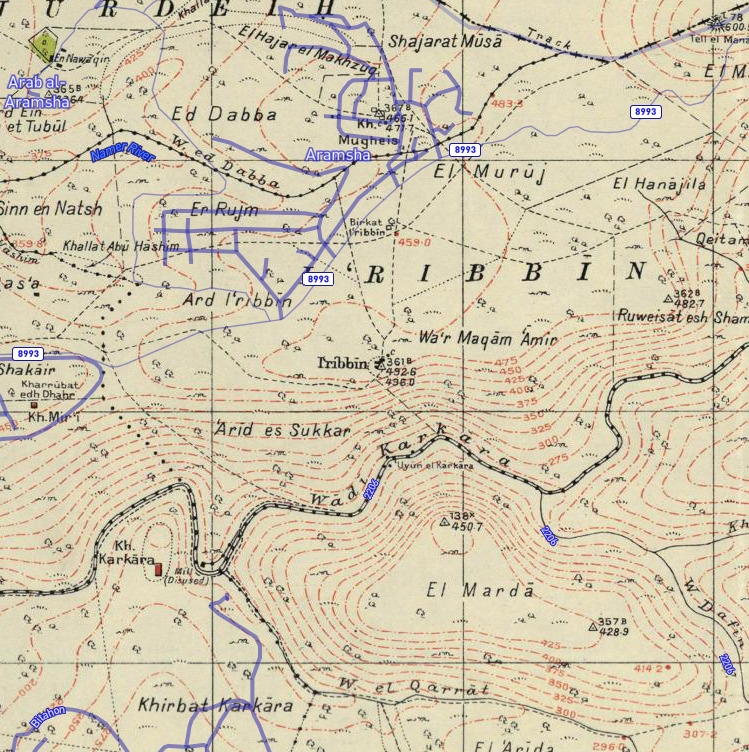
- 1870s map 1940s map modern map 1940s with modern overlay map A series of historical maps of the area around Khirbat Iribbin (click the buttons)

- Location within Mandatory Palestine
- Coordinates: 33°04′50″N 35°13′41″E
- Palestine grid: 172/276
- Geopolitical entity: Mandatory Palestine
- Subdistrict: Acre
- Date of depopulation: October 31, 1948

Area
  - Total: 11,463 dunams (11.463 km^{2}; 4.426 sq mi)

Population (1945)
  - Total: 360
- Cause(s) of depopulation: Military assault by Yishuv forces
- Current Localities: Adamit, Goren

Khirbat Iribbin (Arabic: خربة عربي) or Khurbet 'Arubbin (meaning "The ruin of Arubbin"), was a Palestinian Arab village in the Upper Galilee, located 23 km (14 mi) northeast of the city of Acre. In 1945, it had a built-up land area of over 2,000 dunums and a population of 360 Arab Muslims.

== Location ==
The village was located on the north bank of Wadi Karkara, about 1 km south of the Lebanese border, and with a view to the Mediterranean Sea in the west.

== History ==
A three-aisled Byzantine church (from the 6th or 7th century CE) had been reused as a village house.

=== Ottoman era ===
In 1875 Victor Guérin inspected the place, which he described: "The ruins of this name are scattered over the flanks and summit of a hill, bordered on the south by the deep ravine of Wady Kerkera. Terraces, once regulated by the hand of man and now overgrown with thick underwood, were formerly covered with dwelling-houses whose remains cumber the soil. The foundations of some are still visible. They were small, but tolerably well-built, with regular stones of fair dimensions. On the door, still standing, of one of them, we observe a cross with standing, equal arms set in a niche. Besides these, the ruins of a building measuring twenty-six paces long from west to east, and twenty from north to south, deserve particular attention. It was built with cut stones worked in with much care and without cement. The southern facade was pierced with these doors. Another door, the only one on that side, was constructed in the middle of the western facade; its lintel is lying on the ground. On the east was an apse, whose interior are in place. Within this ancient church are several monolithic columns half hidden by the bushes; they measure 2.50 metres in length, by thirty-five centimetres in diameter. The capitals and the base are wanting, or at all events no longer visible. By the side of this building is observed a sort of subterranean magazine arched in stone with a circular arch. It is partly filled up. On the sumrnit of the hill the vestiges of a town can be recognised. It was approached by a number of steps.'

=== British Mandate era ===
In the 1945 statistics, the village (including Arab al-Aramisha, Jurdayh and Khirbat Idmith) had a population of 360 Muslims. A total of 2,637 dunums of village land were used for cereals, and 16 dunums were irrigated or used for orchards.

=== 1948 and aftermath ===
During the 1948 Arab–Israeli War, it was captured by Israel's Oded Brigade on October 31, 1948, during Operation Hiram.

Following the war the area was incorporated into the State of Israel. Kibbutz Adamit was founded in 1958 on village land, to the west of the village site. The Palestinian historian Walid Khalidi described the village site in 1992: "The site is covered with the debris of houses. It also has a number of wells and caves. The remains of animal shelters are located about 1 km (1 mi) away, and about 4 km (2 mi) to the east is the rubble of houses used by the Arab al-Qulaytat."

Petersen inspected the place in 1991, and found that the remains of the village consisted of several widely spaced rectangular houses, one storey high. Most houses were made of rough field stones laid dry, but with traces of older coursed masonry in places. The roofs were flat, made of earth on top of short branches, resting on transverse arches.

== See also ==
- Depopulated Palestinian locations in Israel
- List of villages depopulated during the Arab–Israeli conflict

== Bibliography ==
- Conder, C.R.; Kitchener, H.H. (1881). The Survey of Western Palestine: Memoirs of the Topography, Orography, Hydrography, and Archaeology. Vol. 1. London: Committee of the Palestine Exploration Fund.
- Government of Palestine, Department of Statistics (1945). Village Statistics, April, 1945.
- Guérin, V. (1880). Description Géographique Historique et Archéologique de la Palestine (in French). Vol. 3: Galilee, pt. 2. Paris: L'Imprimerie Nationale.
- Hadawi, S. (1970). Village Statistics of 1945: A Classification of Land and Area ownership in Palestine. Palestine Liberation Organization Research Center. Archived from the original on 2018-12-08.
- Hütteroth, W.-D.; Abdulfattah, K. (1977). Historical Geography of Palestine, Transjordan and Southern Syria in the Late 16th Century. Erlanger Geographische Arbeiten, Sonderband 5. Erlangen, Germany: Vorstand der Fränkischen Geographischen Gesellschaft. ISBN 3-920405-41-2.
- Khalidi, W. (1992). All That Remains: The Palestinian Villages Occupied and Depopulated by Israel in 1948. Washington D.C.: Institute for Palestine Studies. ISBN 0-88728-224-5.
- Morris, B. (2004). The Birth of the Palestinian Refugee Problem Revisited. Cambridge University Press. ISBN 978-0-521-00967-6.
- Palmer, E.H. (1881). The Survey of Western Palestine: Arabic and English Name Lists Collected During the Survey by Lieutenants Conder and Kitchener, R. E. Transliterated and Explained by E.H. Palmer. Committee of the Palestine Exploration Fund.
- Petersen, Andrew (2001). A Gazetteer of Buildings in Muslim Palestine (British Academy Monographs in Archaeology). Vol. I. Oxford University Press. ISBN 978-0-19-727011-0. Archived from the original on 2021-05-29.
- Pringle, D. (1993). The Churches of the Crusader Kingdom of Jerusalem: A-K (excluding Acre and Jerusalem). Vol. I. Cambridge University Press. ISBN 0-521-39036-2.
- Pringle, D. (1997). Secular buildings in the Crusader Kingdom of Jerusalem: an archaeological Gazetter. Cambridge University Press. ISBN 0521-46010-7.
