= Ya'ara =

Ya'ara: יַעֲרָה (Hebrew)
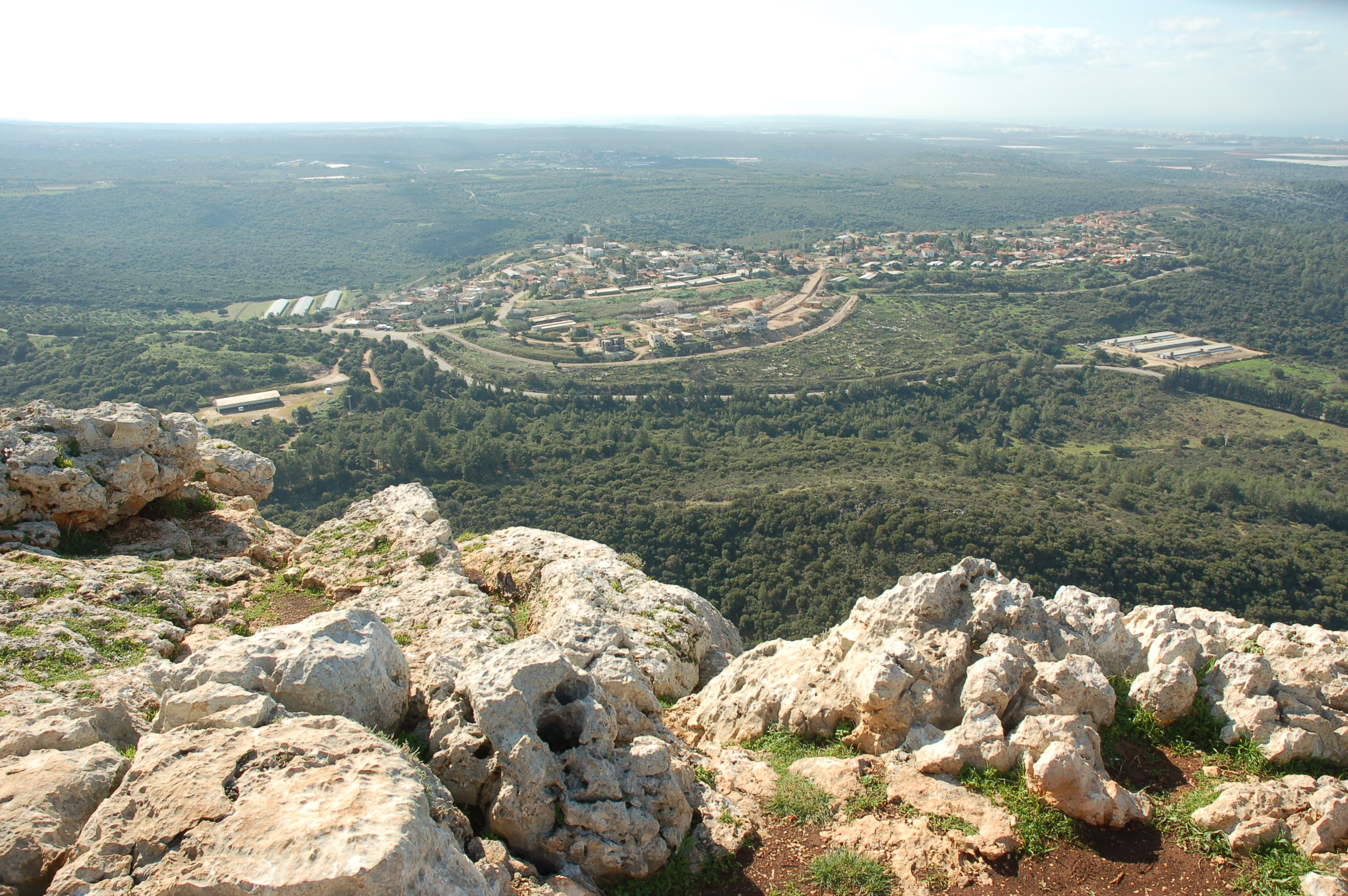

- Location within Northwest Israel Location within Israel
- Coordinates: 33°4′1″N 35°11′5″E
- Country: Israel
- District: Northern
- Subdistrict: Acre
- Council: Ma'ale Yosef
- Affiliation: Moshavim Movement
- Founded: 1950
- Founder: Maghrebi Jews
- Population (2024): 894

Ya'ara (Hebrew: יַעֲרָה, lit. 'Honeysuckle') is a moshav in northern Israel. Located near Ma'alot-Tarshiha, it falls under the jurisdiction of Ma'ale Yosef Regional Council. In 2024 it had a population of 894.

== History ==
The village was established in 1950 on land located near the depopulated Palestinian village of Arab al-Samniyya by immigrants from Yemen, who were later joined by Jewish immigrants from North Africa and local Bedouin, making it the first mixed Jewish-Bedouin village in the country. It was named after the surrounding forests.

During the 2023–24 conflict between Israel and Hezbollah, northern Israeli border communities including Ya'ara faced targeted attacks by Hezbollah and Palestinian factions based in Lebanon, resulting in their evacuation.
