= Even Menachem =

Moshav in northern Israel

Even Menachem: אֶבֶן מְנַחֵם (Hebrew)
- Location within Northwest Israel Location within Israel
- Coordinates: 33°4′26″N 35°17′42″E
- Country: Israel
- District: Northern
- Subdistrict: Acre
- Council: Ma'ale Yosef
- Affiliation: Moshavim Movement
- Founded: 13 September 1960
- Founder: North African Jewish immigrants and refugees
- Population (2024): 448

Even Menachem (Hebrew: אֶבֶן מְנַחֵם) is a moshav in northern Israel. Located in the Western Galilee, about six kilometers northwest of Ma'alot-Tarshiha, it falls under the jurisdiction of Ma'ale Yosef Regional Council. In 2024 it had a population of 448.

== History ==
The moshav was founded on 13 September 1960 by Jewish immigrants and refugees from North Africa on land located near the Palestinian villages of Iqrit, Al-Nabi Rubin, Suruh and Tarbikha, which were depopulated during the 1948 Arab–Israeli War. It was named after Arthur Menachem Hantke, a prominent Zionist leader in pre-war Germany.

The moshav came under Hezbollah rocket fire several times over its history due to its proximity to the Israel-Lebanon border; most recently it was hit during Hezbollah's diversionary salvo at the opening of the 2006 Lebanon War, as well as during the later rocket and mortar attacks.

== Archaeology ==
In a burial cave near Even Menachem that remained untouched by lotters, a Greek inscription was discovered etched above one loculus. The inscription, "ΙΟΣΗΦΟΥΚΟΚ ΧΟΣ" (Iosephus kokchos), translates to "The loculus (burial niche) of Iosephus." The second word is distinctive, and in fact is a Greek adaptation of the Hebrew term כוך (kwk). Originally described as having three sections filled with numerous niches, the cave was found to contain two Greek inscriptions over different niches, separated by a carving of a human figure.
