= Zar'it =

Moshav in northern Israel

Zar'it: זַרְעִית (Hebrew)
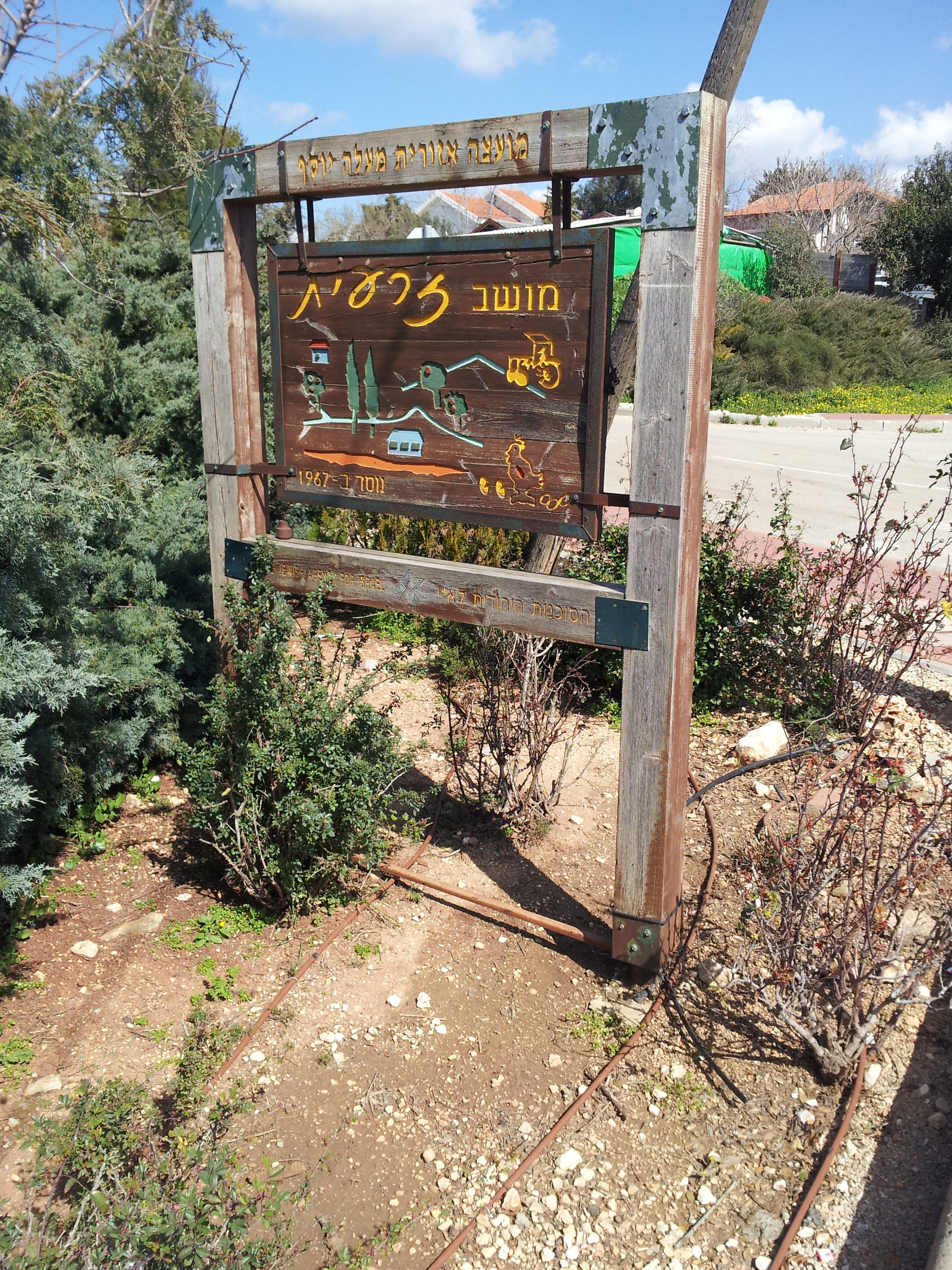

- Location within Northwest Israel Location within Israel
- Coordinates: 33°6′0″N 35°17′19″E
- Country: Israel
- District: Northern
- Subdistrict: Acre
- Council: Ma'ale Yosef
- Founded: 1967
- Founder: Galilee moshavniks
- Population (2024): 351

Zar'it (Hebrew: זַרְעִית) is a moshav in northern Israel. Located in the Upper Galilee near the Lebanese border, it falls under the jurisdiction of Ma'ale Yosef Regional Council. In 2024 it had a population of 351.

== History ==
Zar'it is located on the land of the depopulated former Palestinian villages of Al-Nabi Rubin, Suruh and Tarbikha.

The moshav was established in 1967 by young people with a moshav background from the Galilee as part of Operation Sof Sof, designed to strengthen Jewish presence in the Galilee. It was initially named Kfar Rosenwald (Rosenwald Village) after American philanthropist William Rosenwald. However, the foreign-sounding name of the village didn't sit well with its residents, so as a compromise, Yehuda Ziv, the head of community naming suggested an acronym incorporating Rosenwald's name within a Hebrew word, Zar'it (Zekher Rosenwald Imanu Yisha'er Tamid, lit. Rosenwald's memory will be with us always).

The village was the site of Hezbollah's initial attack in the 2006 Lebanon War, and was the target of several rocket attacks.

=== 2023 war ===
During the Gaza war, northern Israeli border communities, including Zar'it, faced targeted attacks by Hezbollah and Palestinian factions based in Lebanon, and were evacuated. In October 2024, the IDF said they uncovered and destroyed an active Hezbollah tunnel that originated near the Lebanese town Marwahin and emerged in Zar'it. The tunnel extended 10 metres into the Israeli border, according to the IDF report.
