= Tarbikha =

Tarbikha تربيخا
- Former village
- Etymology: possibly from Teir Bikha, the Fortress of Bikha
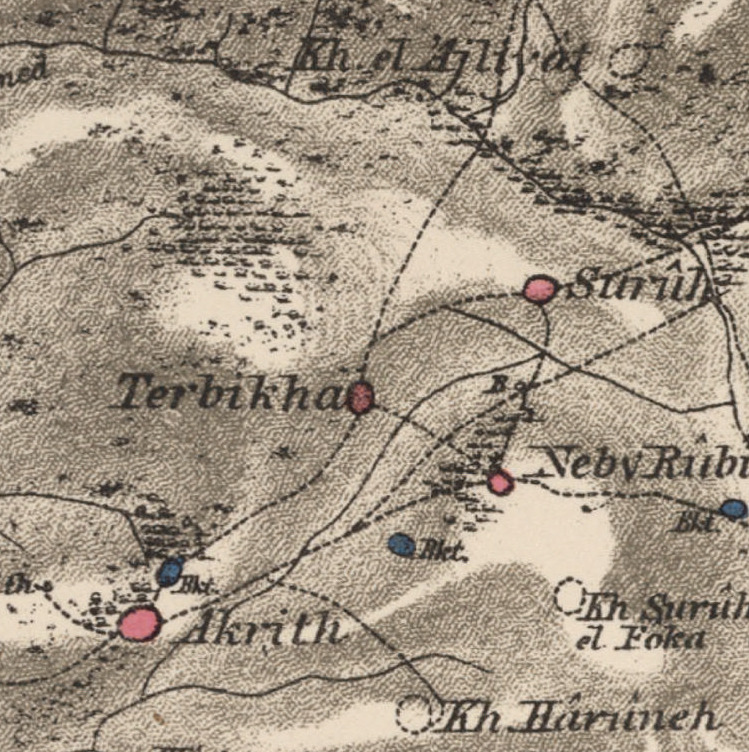
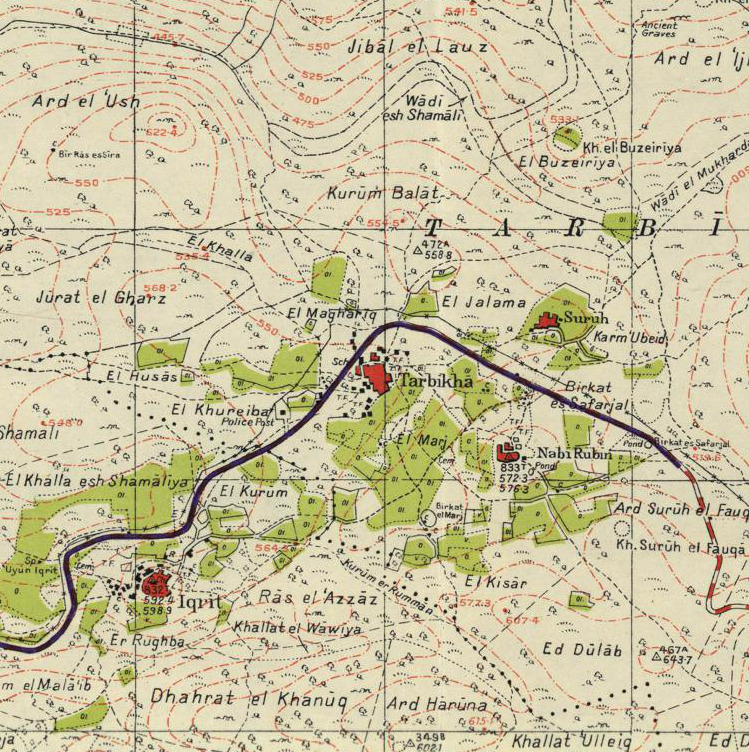
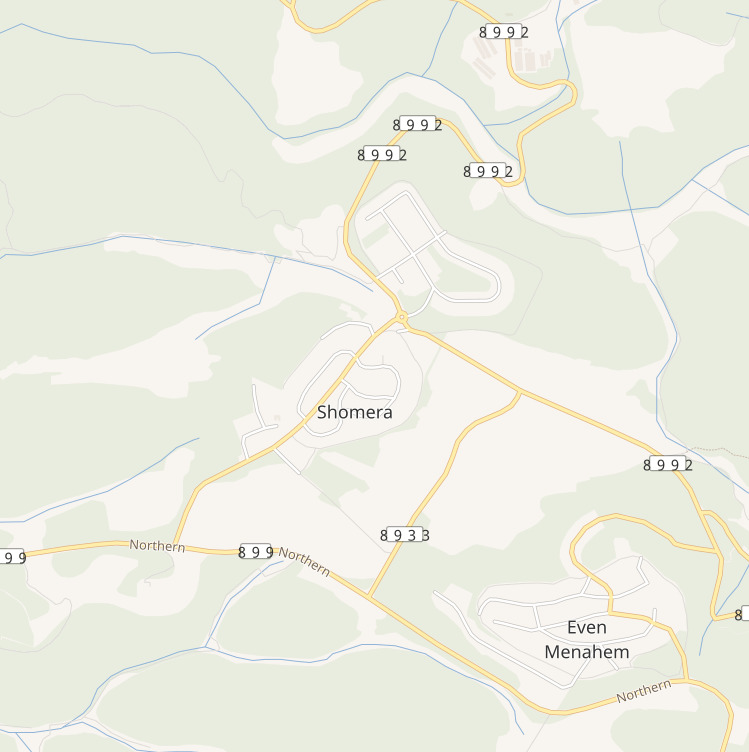
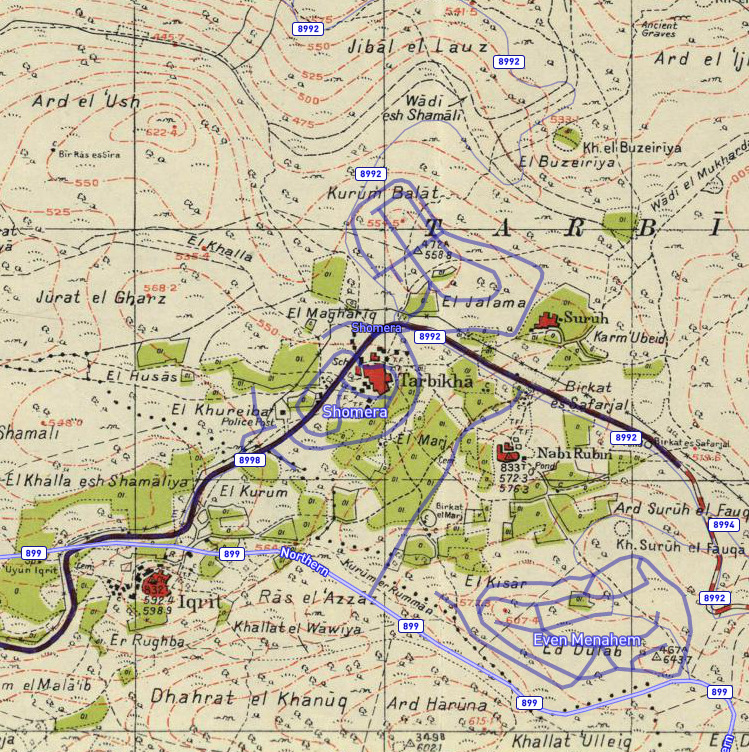
- 1870s map 1940s map modern map 1940s with modern overlay map A series of historical maps of the area around Tarbikha (click the buttons)

- Location within Mandatory Palestine
- Coordinates: 33°04′59″N 35°17′06″E
- Palestine grid: 177/276
- Geopolitical entity: Mandatory Palestine
- Subdistrict: Acre
- Date of depopulation: Early November 1948

Area
  - Total: 18,563 dunams (18.563 km^{2}; 7.167 sq mi)

Population (1945)
  - Total: 1,000
- Cause(s) of depopulation: Expulsion by Yishuv forces
- Current Localities: Shomera, Even Menachem, Shtula, Zar'it

Tarbikha (Arabic: تربيخا), was a Palestinian Arab village. It was located 27 kilometres (17 miles) northeast of Acre in the British Mandate District of Acre that was captured and depopulated by the Israel Defense Forces during the 1948 Arab-Israeli war. The inhabitants of this village were, similar to the inhabitants of Southern Lebanon, Shia Muslims.

== History ==
Three sarcophagi were found on the south side of the village. A semi-circular pool, cisterns and tombs were also found.

Tarbikha was located on the site of the Crusaders Tayerebika, from which it derived its name. In 1183 it was noted that Godfrey de Tor sold the land of the village to Joscelin III. In 1220 Jocelyn III's daughter Beatrix de Courtenay and her husband Otto von Botenlauben, Count of Henneberg, sold their land, including Tayerbica, to the Teutonic Knights.

=== Ottoman era ===
Tarbikha was incorporated into the Ottoman Empire in 1517 with the rest of Palestine, and by 1596 it was part of the nahiya (subdistrict) of Tibnin under the Liwa of Safad, with a population of 88. It paid taxes on a number of crops, including wheat, olives and barley, as well as on goats, beehives and a press that was used for processing either olives or grapes.

In the late nineteenth century, the village of Tarbikha was described as being built of stone and situated on a ridge. The population was estimated at being around 100, and they lived by cultivating olives. During this period Tarbikha was a part of the Beirut province. Only after World War I, when the borders between Lebanon and Palestine were delineated by the British and French, did Tarbikha come under Palestinian administration.

=== British Mandate era ===
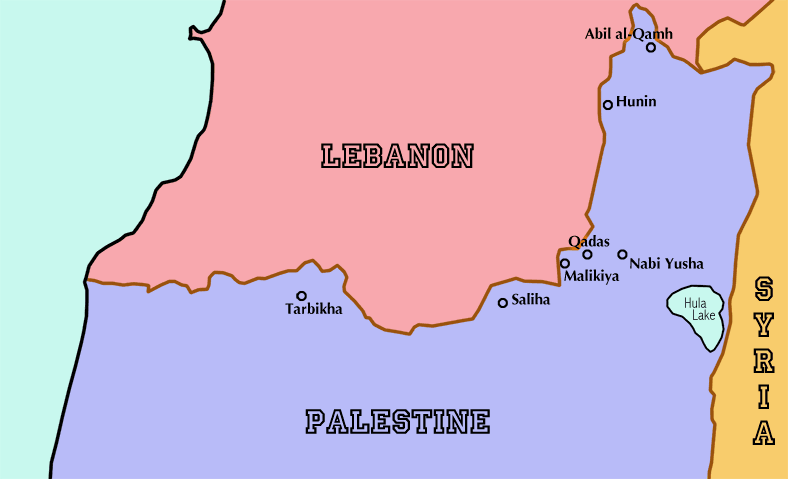
Map of the seven former Shia villages in Israel

In the 1931 census of Palestine, conducted by the British Mandate authorities, Tarbikha had a population of 674; 1 Christian and the rest Muslims, in a total of 149 houses.

The village had two mosques, and an elementary school, founded after 1938, which had an enrollment of 120 students in the mid-1940s. It also had a customs office and a police station for monitoring the Lebanese border.

In the 1945 statistics the village population was counted together with that of Suruh and Al-Nabi Rubin, together they had 1000 Muslim inhabitants and a total of 18,563 dunams of land. Of this, a total of 3,200 dunums allocated to cereals, while 619 dunums were irrigated or used for orchards, while 112 dunams were built-up (urban) area.

=== 1948 war and aftermath ===
The town was assaulted during Operation Hiram by the Oded Brigade on 30 October 1948. The population was ordered to leave for Lebanon in early November. The military did not let the Arabs gather the crops they planted; rather the military allowed the Jews of the kibbutz Tarbikha to gather the crops and left the villages unguarded, which allowed any passerby access to the items in the unguarded village. The village lands of Tarbikha were settled by Jewish immigrants from Hungary and Romania as part of the policy of Judaisation of Northern Israel.

The Palestinian historian Walid Khalidi, described the village remaining structures in 1992: "About twenty houses from the village are now occupied by the residents of Moshav Shomera. Some of the roofs have been remodeled and given a gabled form. Stones from the original houses embellish the roof of the central shelter of the moshav."

In 1994, the refugees from the seven villages, who had been classified as Palestinian refugees since 1948, were granted Lebanese citizenship.

== See also ==
- Depopulated Palestinian locations in Israel
- Metawali
- Shia villages in Palestine

== Bibliography ==
- Conder, C.R.; Kitchener, H.H. (1881). The Survey of Western Palestine: Memoirs of the Topography, Orography, Hydrography, and Archaeology. Vol. 1. London: Committee of the Palestine Exploration Fund.
- Department of Statistics (1945). Village Statistics, April, 1945. Government of Palestine.
- Frankel, Rafael (1988). "Topographical notes on the territory of Acre in the Crusader period". Israel Exploration Journal. 38 (4): 249–272. JSTOR 27926125.
- Hadawi, S. (1970). Village Statistics of 1945: A Classification of Land and Area ownership in Palestine. Palestine Liberation Organization Research Center.
- Hütteroth, W.-D.; Abdulfattah, K. (1977). Historical Geography of Palestine, Transjordan and Southern Syria in the Late 16th Century. Erlanger Geographische Arbeiten, Sonderband 5. Erlangen, Germany: Vorstand der Fränkischen Geographischen Gesellschaft. ISBN 978-3-920405-41-4.
- Khalidi, W. (1992). All That Remains: The Palestinian Villages Occupied and Depopulated by Israel in 1948. Washington D.C.: Institute for Palestine Studies. ISBN 978-0-88728-224-9.
- Mills, E., ed. (1932). Census of Palestine 1931. Population of Villages, Towns and Administrative Areas. Jerusalem: Government of Palestine.
- Morris, B. (2004). The Birth of the Palestinian Refugee Problem Revisited. Cambridge University Press. ISBN 978-0-521-00967-6.
- Palmer, E.H. (1881). The Survey of Western Palestine: Arabic and English Name Lists Collected During the Survey by Lieutenants Conder and Kitchener, R. E. Transliterated and Explained by E.H. Palmer. Committee of the Palestine Exploration Fund.
- Peteet, Julie (2011). Landscape of Hope and Despair: Palestinian Refugee Camps. University of Pennsylvania Press. ISBN 9780812200317.
- Rhode, H. (1979). Administration and Population of the Sancak of Safed in the Sixteenth Century. Columbia University. Archived from the original on 1 March 2020.
- Röhricht, R. (1893). (RRH) Regesta regni Hierosolymitani (MXCVII-MCCXCI) (in Latin). Berlin: Libraria Academica Wageriana.
- Strehlke, E., ed. (1869). Tabulae Ordinis Theutonici ex tabularii regii Berolinensis codice potissimum. Berlin: Weidmanns.
- Totah, Khalil (1955). Dynamite in the Middle East. Philosophical Library. ISBN 9780802217318.
