= Adamit =

Kibbutz in northern Israel

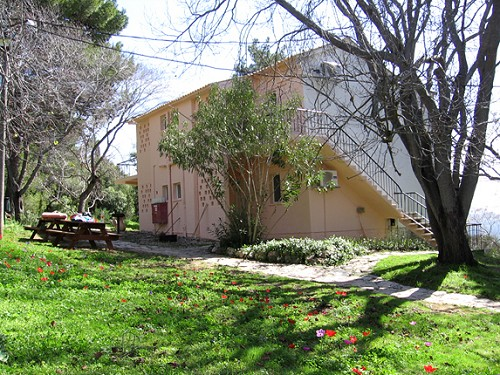

- Location within Northwest Israel Location within Israel
- Coordinates: 33°4′42″N 35°12′40″E
- Country: Israel
- District: Northern
- Subdistrict: Acre
- Council: Mateh Asher
- Region: Western Galilee
- Affiliation: Kibbutz Movement
- Founded: August 1958
- Founder: Hashomer Hatzair members
- Population (2024): 368

Adamit (Hebrew: אֲדָמִית) is a kibbutz in northern Israel. Located in the western Galilee in Israel near the border with Lebanon, it falls under the jurisdiction of Mateh Asher Regional Council. In 2024 it had a population of 368.

== History ==
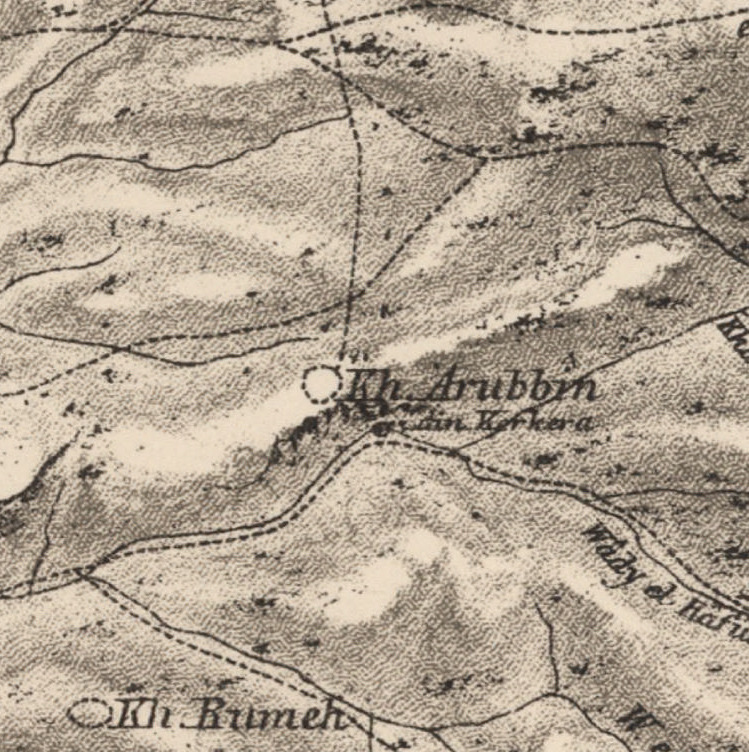
An 1870s map of the area of Khirbat Iribbin from the PEF Survey of Palestine

Kibbutz Adamit was founded in August 1958 by members of Hashomer Hatzair, and was named after a Second Temple period town whose ruins were found in the area. The kibbutz was founded on land near the depopulated former Palestinian village of Khirbat Iribbin, to the west of the village site. In 1971, the kibbutz was resettled by new immigrants from England, United States and Canada, after a year of training at kibbutz Mishmar HaEmek. During the 1980s, the kibbutz suffering from financial problems and was put under administrative receivership. Since the 1990s, a new build-your-own-home neighborhood has been developed along the hillside.

=== 2023 war ===
During the 2023 war between Hamas and Israel, northern Israeli border communities, including Adamit, faced targeted attacks by Hezbollah and Palestinian factions based in Lebanon, and were evacuated.

== Geography and climate ==
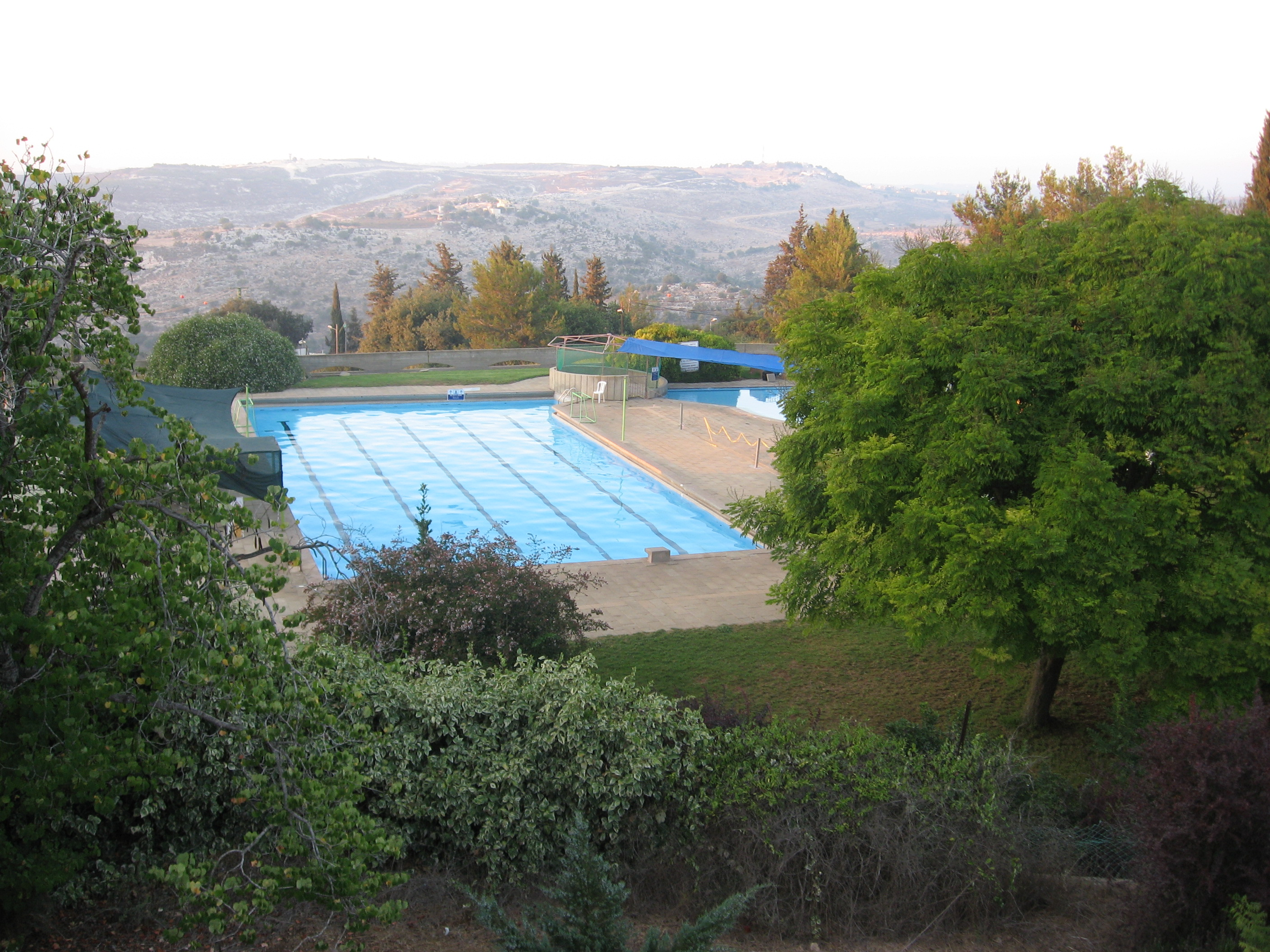
Kibbutz swimming pool

The kibbutz is situated on a hill, offering a panoramic view of the Galilee. On one side lies the Nahal Betzet nature reserve, and to the north, Nahal Namer. The region receives 750 millimeters of rainfall per annum, which is relatively high for Israel.

== Economy ==
The kibbutz operates a chicken coop, orchards and a metalwork factory. It also rents out vacation cabins to tourists.
