= Shomera =

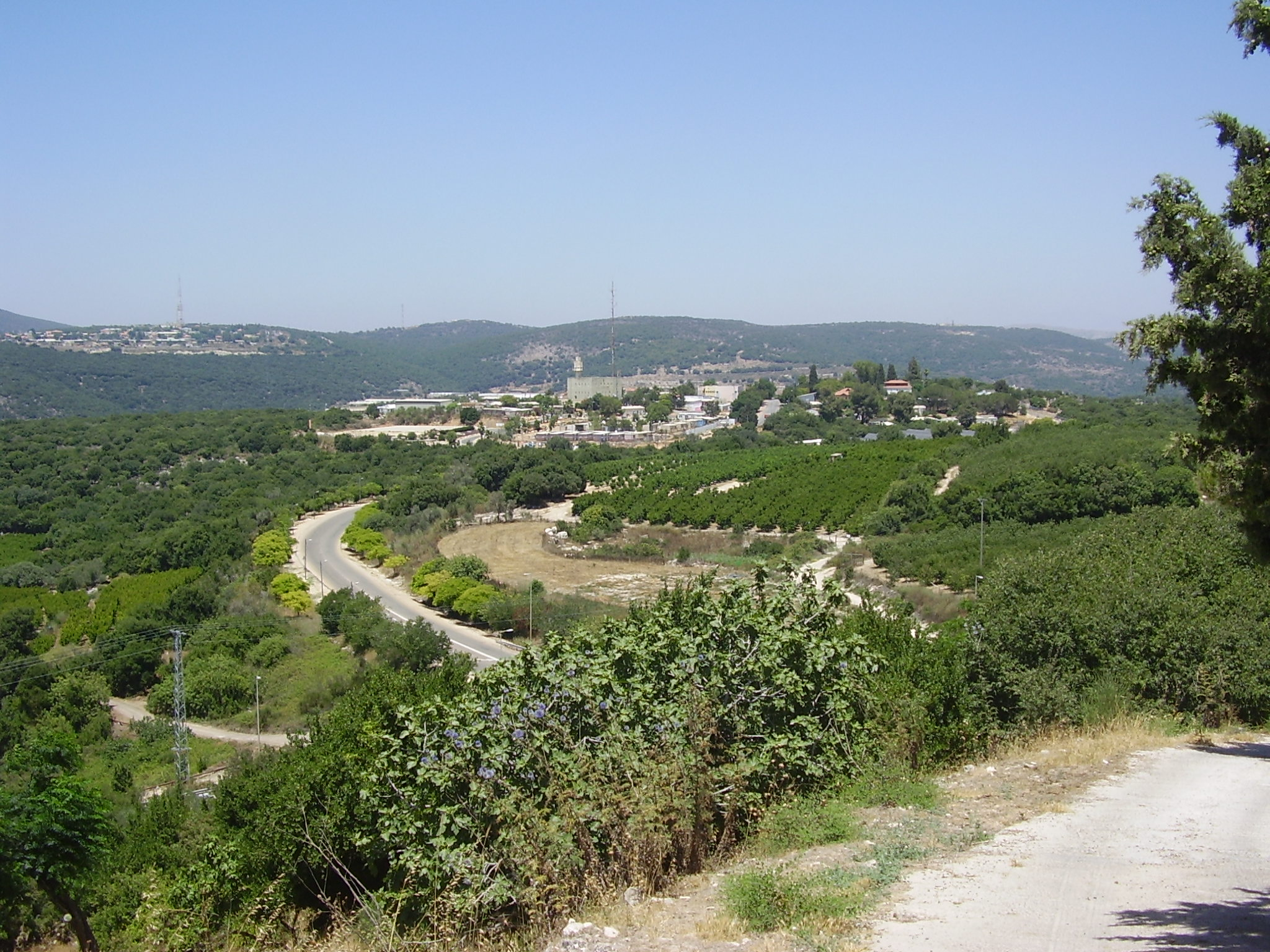

- Location within Northwest Israel
- Coordinates: 33°4′58″N 35°17′3″E
- Country: Israel
- District: Northern
- Subdistrict: Acre
- Council: Ma'ale Yosef
- Affiliation: Moshavim Movement
- Founded: 1949
- Founder: Hungarian and Romanian Jews
- Population (2024): 428

Shomera (Hebrew: שׁוֹמֵרָה, lit. 'Guard') is a moshav in northern Israel. Located near the Lebanese border, it falls under the jurisdiction of Ma'ale Yosef Regional Council. In 2024 it had a population of 428.

== History ==
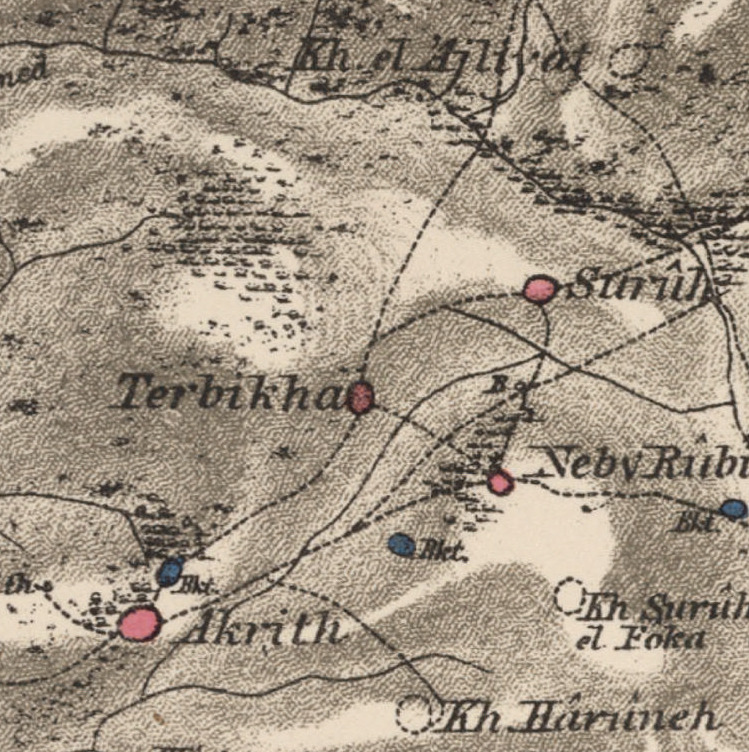
An 1870s map of the area of Tarbikha from the PEF Survey of Palestine

The moshav was established in 1949 by Jewish immigrants from Hungary and Romania on the site of the Shia village of Tarbikha. Its land is near the former Palestinian villages of Iqrit, Suruh and Tarbikha, all of which were depopulated by Israel in the 1948 Arab–Israeli War. The name reflects the moshav's proximity to the Lebanese border.

The original residents abandoned the village shortly after its foundation, but the following year it was re-established by Jewish immigrants from Morocco.

An Israel Defense Forces armory is located in the moshav.

== Gallery ==
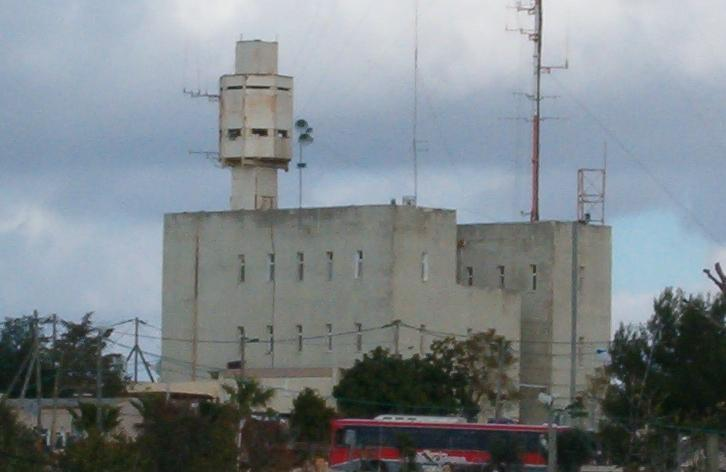
Tegart fort in Shomera.

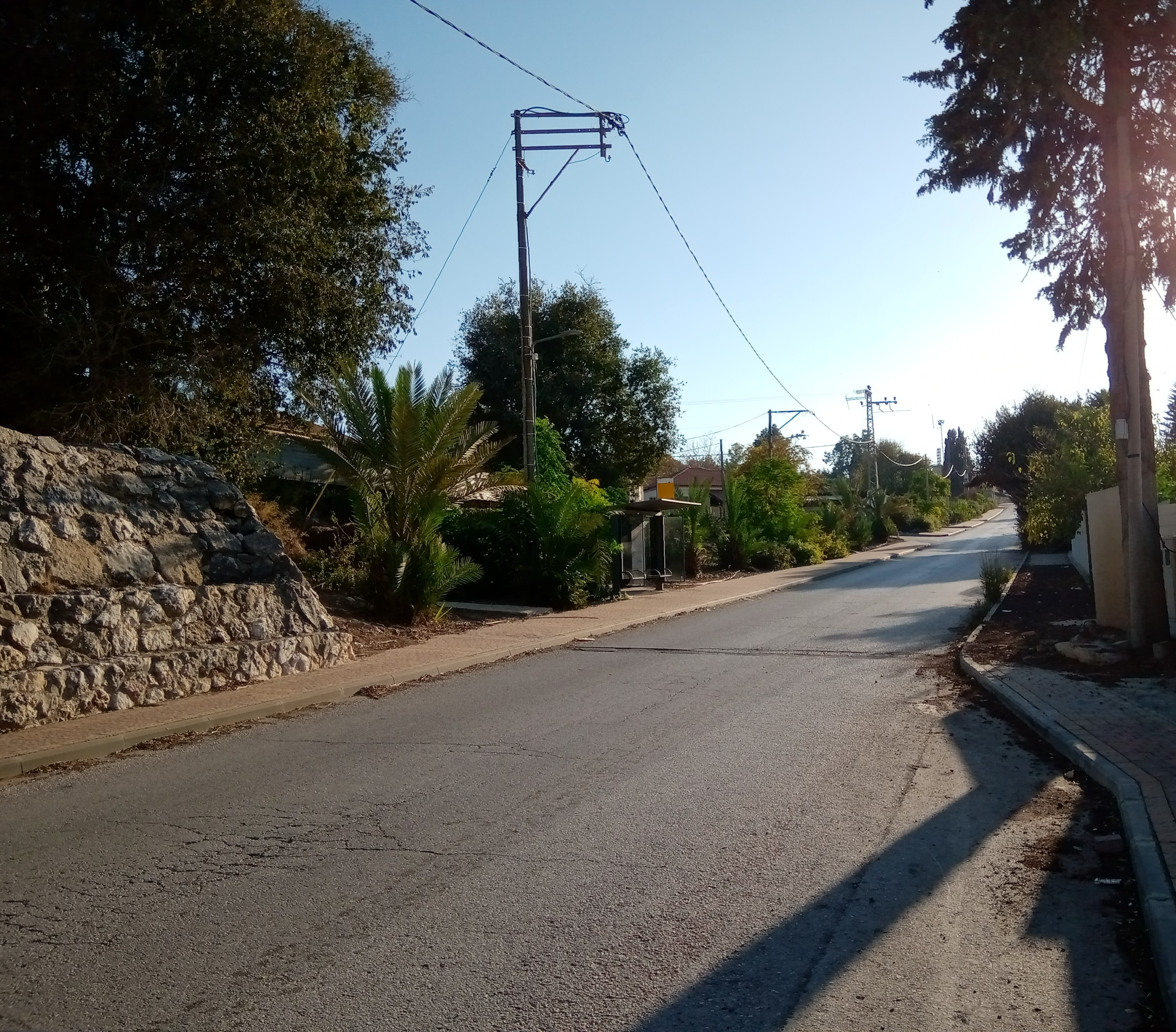
A street in Shomera.

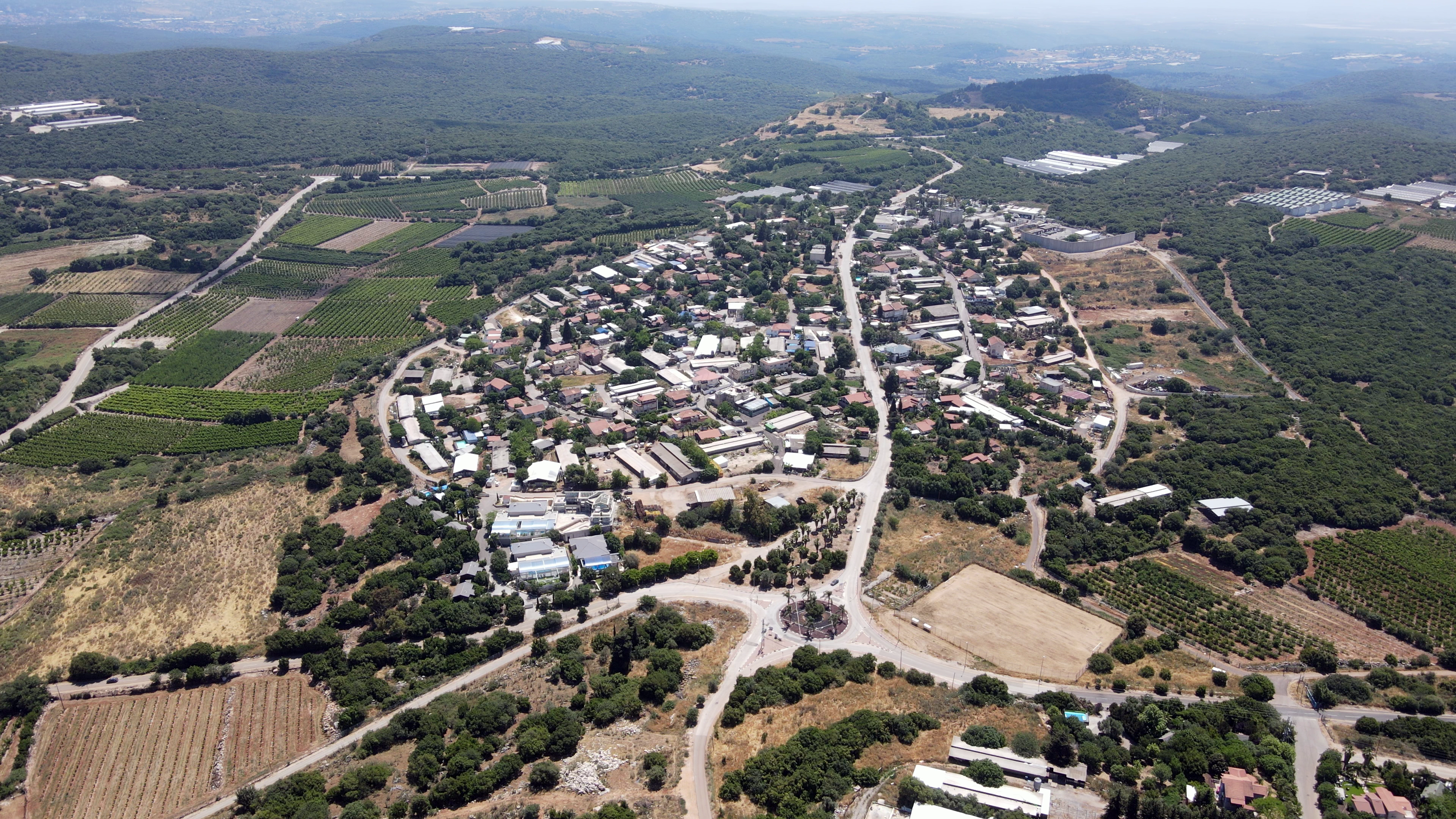
Shomera from a bird's eye view
