= Shtula =

Shtula: שְׁתוּלָה (Hebrew)
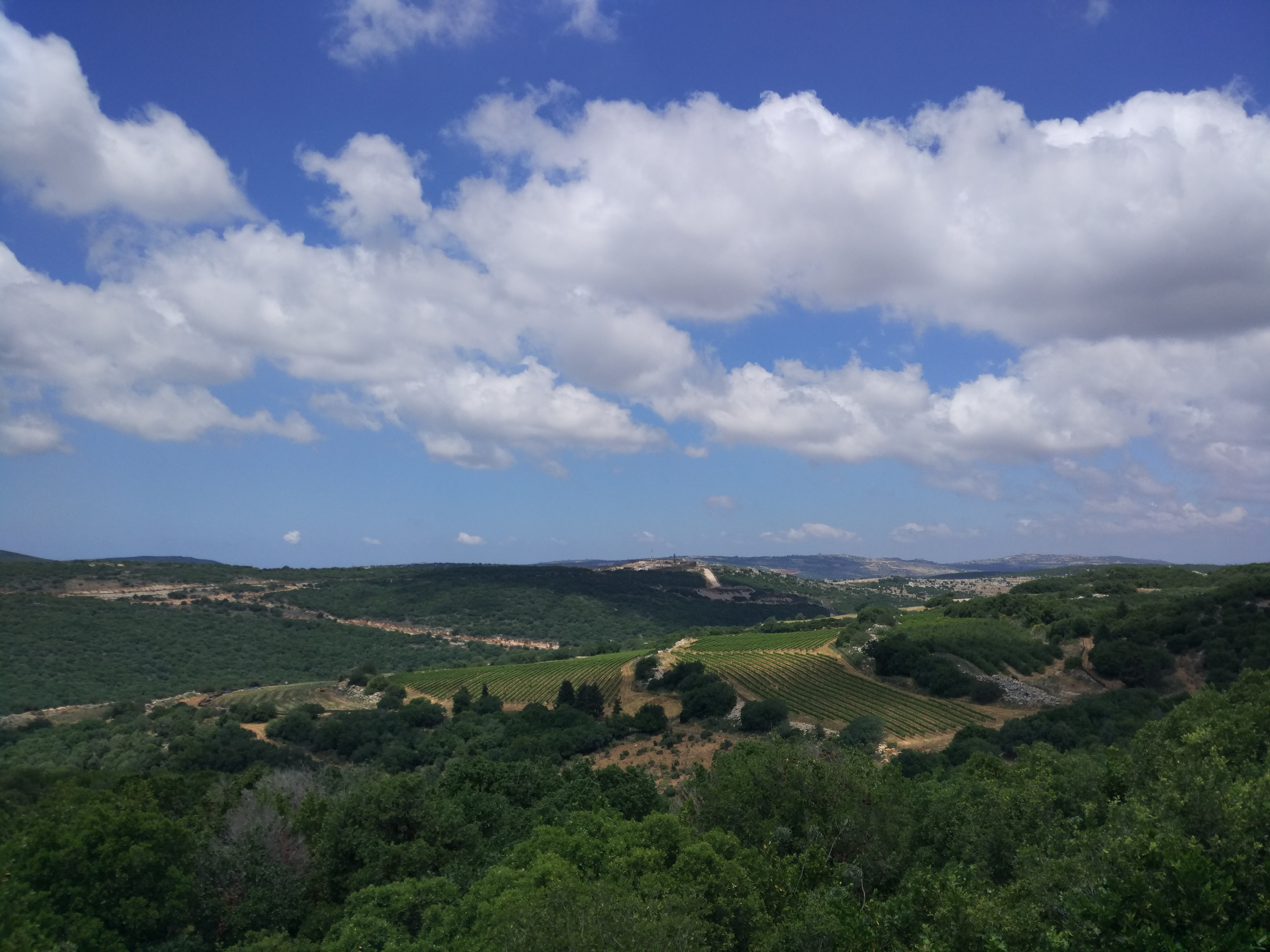
- Etymology: "Planted"
- Location within Northwest Israel Location within Israel
- Coordinates: 33°5′8″N 35°18′47″E
- Country: Israel
- District: Northern
- Subdistrict: Acre
- Council: Ma'ale Yosef
- Affiliation: Moshavim Movement
- Founded: 1967
- Founder: Galilee moshavniks
- Population (2024): 374
- Website: www.shtula.org.il

Shtula (Hebrew: שְׁתוּלָה, lit. 'Planted') is a moshav in northern Israel. Located in the Upper Galilee near the Lebanese border, it falls under the jurisdiction of Ma'ale Yosef Regional Council. In 2024, it had a population of 374.

== History ==
Moshav Shtula was established in 1967 as part of a program to strengthen the Jewish presence in the Galilee. Many members of the community were immigrants from the Iraqi town of Koy Sanjaq and children in the moshav were taught Jewish Neo-Aramaic.

The moshav is located on land near the Palestinian villages of Suruh and Tarbikha, which were depopulated in the 1948 Arab–Israeli War.

The village was the site of Hezbollah's cross-border raid in the 2006 Lebanon War, in which three Israeli soldiers were killed and two captured.

In 2006, a resident of Shtula, Sara Khatan, was honored with lighting a torch on Israel Independence Day for her contribution to Upper Galilee tourism.

In 2014, a resident of Shtula alerted the Hebrew University Cave Research Unit to a deep cave near the moshav. The researchers declared it a record for Israel at 187-meters deep.

Amidst the Israeli war on Gaza, Hezbollah militants targeting northern Israeli border communities, necessitated the evacuation of several, including Shtula. On October 14, a Hezbollah-launched anti-tank missile struck Shtula, resulting in the death of one person and the injury of three others.
