= The man in the wall =

Archaeological site in Israel

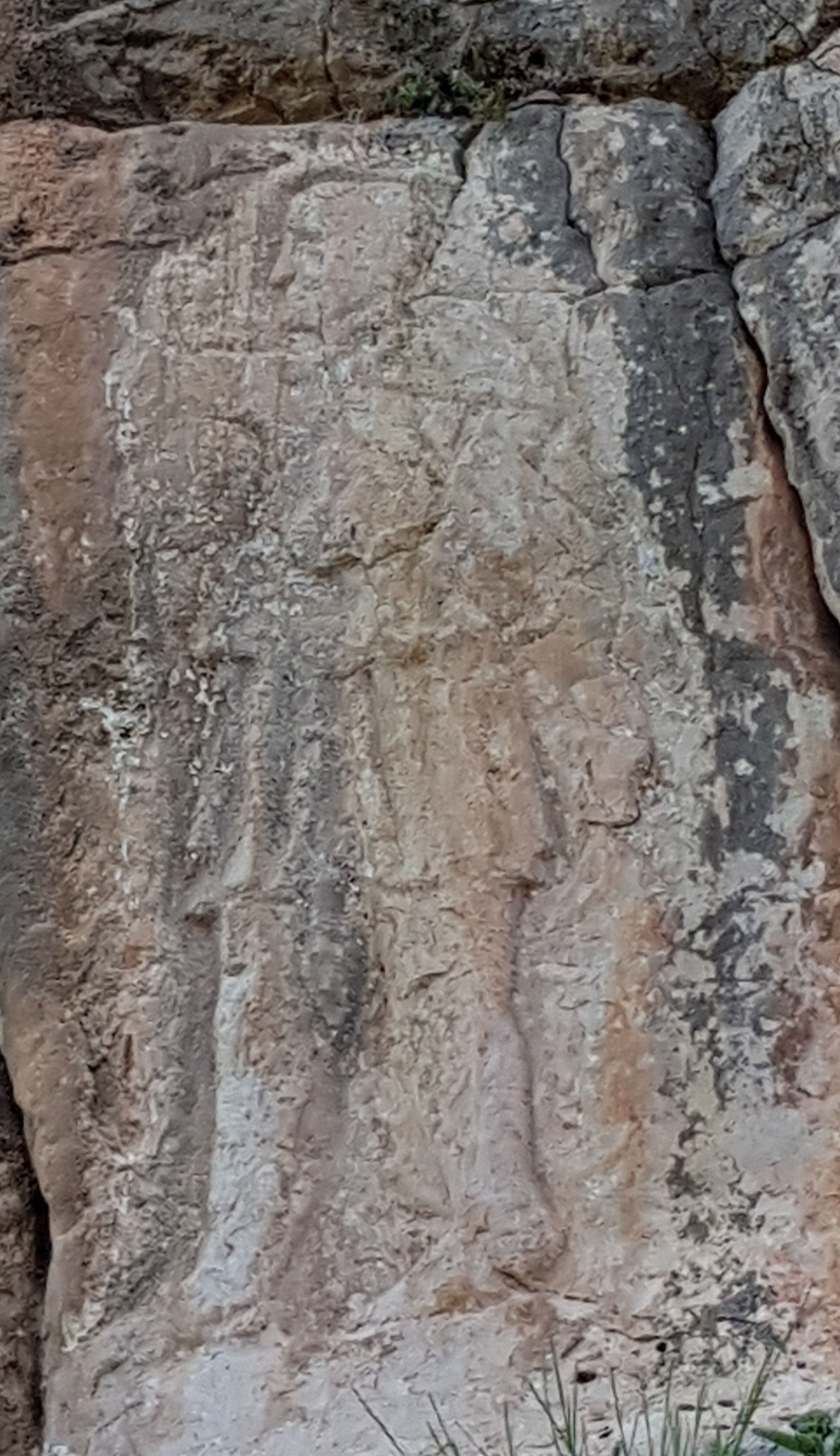
Man in wall in Nahal Kziv

The man in the wall is a unique relief of a Roman soldier carved in an Hellenistic style into a cliff wall near the Temple cave above Nahal Kziv, by the settlement of Abirim in Galilee, Israel.

== Description ==
The relief is engraved into the rock at a height of about 3 meters to the right of the entrance of the Temple cave (Al-Jalila cave). located on the steep northern slope above Nahal Kziv, about two kilometers west of the settlement of Abirim.

The relief depicts a male figure, probably a Roman warrior, dressed in a typical pleated dress draped over his arm. His legs are muscular and his right hand is raised forward. To his left is a dagger sheath, and on his head is probably a helmet. The height of the figure is about one and a half meters. It is not known who is depicted in the relief and who engraved it, but according to the pottery found in the nearby Temple cave, the relief dates to the Hellenistic period in the Land of Israel. Similar reliefs were discovered in Lebanon and Syria, but not in Israel.

== History ==
The relief was discovered in 1985 by Shmuel Beer who conducted an archaeological survey of the caves in the Nahal Kziv cliff.

For several years the location of the relief was kept a secret, but eventually a trail was marked to it by the trail marking committee and it became public domain. In 1992, a copy of the relief was prepared by the Israel Antiquities Authority.
