= Malkiya =

Malkiya may refer to:

- Malkia, a kibbutz in northern Israel
- Malkiya, Bahrain
  - Malkiya Club, a football club from the town in Bahrain
- Al-Malikiyah, a town in Syria
- al-Malkiyya, a depopulated Palestinian village in Israel
