= Oded Brigade =

Israeli military unit

- חטיבת עודד
- Brigade insignia
- Active: 1948-?
- Country: Israel
- Allegiance: Israel Defense Forces
- Branch: Infantry
- Type: Reserve
- Size: Brigade
- Part of: 210th Division
- Engagements: 1948 Arab–Israeli War; Battle of Al-Malkiyya; Operation Hiram; Operation Yoav; Suez Crisis

The Oded Brigade (Hebrew: חטיבת עודד), is a unit in the Israel Defense Forces, also known as the 9th Brigade. It is part of the Bashan division in the IDF Northern Command, responsible for the front with Syria. In the 1948 Arab-Israeli war, it was one of ten brigades fielded by the Haganah (the precursor of the Israel Defense Forces). It was headquartered in Jerusalem. It was "a ragtag organization composed mainly of home guardsmen and other defense groups." The poorly supplied brigade was defending Al-Malkiyya in June 1948, replacing the Yiftach Brigade, when the Lebanese army attacked. The Oded Brigade had to withdraw after 10 hours of fighting.

In July 1948, the brigade moved to capture the Arab villages Malha and Ein Karim, with the support of LEHI and Irgun, aiming to link up with the Harel Brigade and capture the Tel Aviv-Jerusalem Railway. There was limited fighting.

The brigade had attached to it a "Unit of the Minorities" made up of Druze, and smaller numbers of Bedouins and Circassians, who had defected from the Arab Liberation Army. The unit saw action with the brigade in Operation Hiram during October 1948. This was a propaganda coup and helped strengthen Jewish-Druze relations. Ben Dunkelman says that the brigade had a mainly diversionary role in Operation Hiram. The brigade also took part in Operation Yoav in October 1948, which opened the road to the Negev.

Involved in the Sinai Campaign against Egypt, the brigade held a victory assembly at Sharm el-Sheikh on 6 November 1956.

== Organization ==
- 9th Infantry Brigade "Oded" (Reserve)
  - 7006th Infantry Battalion
  - 9204th Infantry Battalion
  - 9211th Infantry Battalion
  - (6724th) Reconnaissance Battalion "Oded"
  - Logistic Battalion
  - 7044th Signal Company

== See also ==
- List of battles and operations in the 1948 Palestine war
