= Correcting a Mistake =

Book by Benny Morris

Correcting a Mistake: Jews and Arabs in Palestine/Israel, 1936–1956 (Hebrew: תיקון טעות: יהודים וערבים בארץ ישראל: 1936–1956, Tikun Ta'ut: yehudim v'araviim b'eretz yisrael 1936–1956) is a book by Israeli historian Benny Morris.

Tikun Ta'ut is a collection of articles published in 2000 in Hebrew by Am Oved. One of the articles focuses on new evidence regarding Operation Hiram in the 1948 Arab–Israeli War: documents released by the IDF Archives revealed that on 31 October 1948, Major General Moshe Carmel issued a radio order during the operation addressing all division and district commanders under his command, in which he said: "Do all in your power to clear quickly and immediately from the areas conquered all hostile elements in accordance with the orders issued. The inhabitants should be assisted to leave the conquered areas."

According to Morris, his mistake was to believe what Carmel and others told him—that no deportation order was issued during Operation Hiram. Because of the cable mentioned above, he found himself obliged to correct his book The Birth of the Palestinian Refugee Problem, 1947–1948 with this article.
