= Sword Battalion =

Defunct unit of the Israel Defense Forces

- גְּדוּד חֶרֶב كتيبة السيف
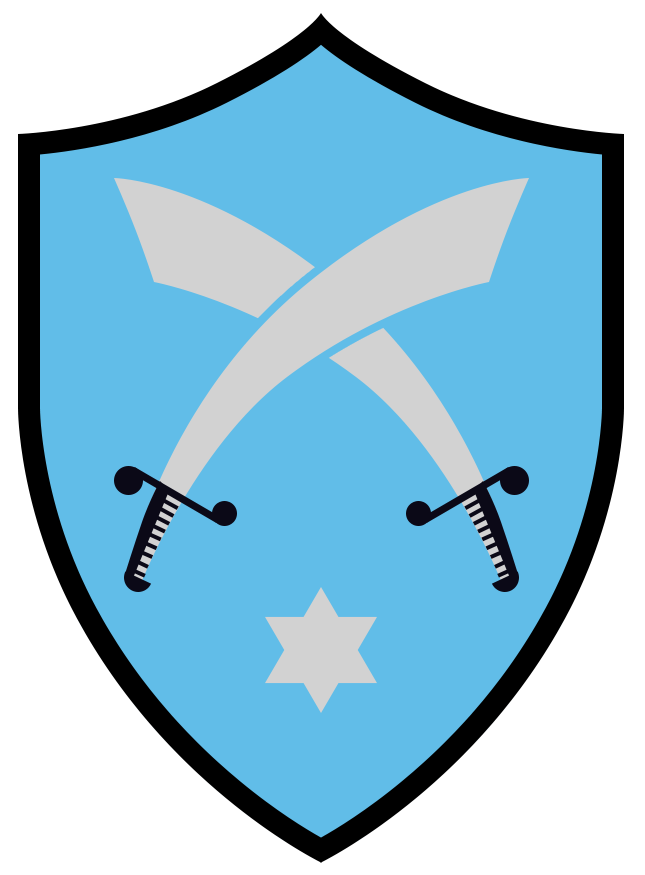
- Active: 1948–2015
- Country: Israel
- Branch: Ground Forces
- Type: Light infantry
- Size: Battalion
- Part of: 91st Division
- Nickname: IDF Minorities Unit
- Engagements: First Arab–Israeli War (1948–1949): Operation Hiram; Israeli Reprisal Operations (1949–1966); Second Arab–Israeli War (1956); Third Arab–Israeli War (1967); Arab–Israeli War of Attrition (1967–1970); Fourth Arab–Israeli War (1973); Operation Litani (1978); First Lebanon War (1982–1985); South Lebanon War (1985–2000); First Intifada (1987–1993); Second Intifada (2000–2005); Second Lebanon War (2006); Operation Cast Lead (2008–2009); Operation Pillar of Defense (2012); Operation Protective Edge (2014)

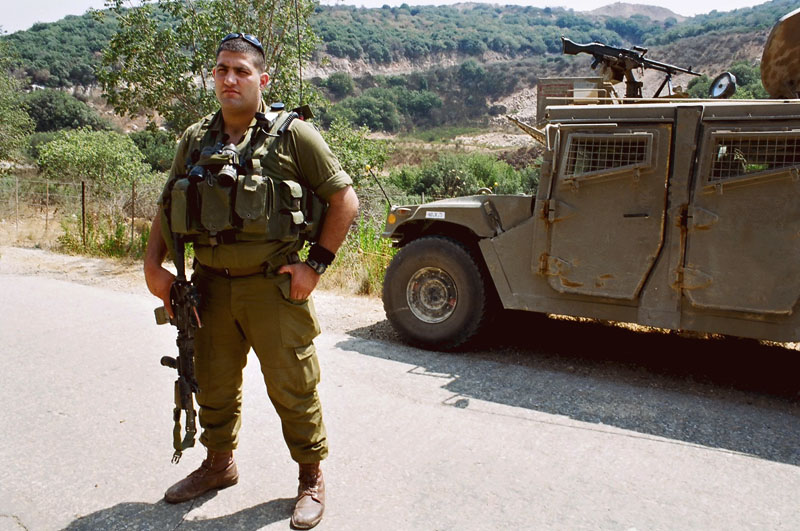
Druze officer of Israel's Sword Battalion, 2007

The Sword Battalion (Hebrew: גְּדוּד חֶרֶב Gdud Ḥerev; Arabic: كتيبة السيف Katībat al-Sayf), previously Unit 300 and also known as the IDF Minorities Unit, was an Arab-dominated military unit of the Israel Defense Forces. It predominantly enlisted Druze, who made up the majority in the unit until it was disbanded in 2015, although a sizable number of recruits were Bedouin and non-Arab Circassians. Men from the Druze and Circassian communities are subject to Israeli conscription laws, while Bedouin and other Arabs may voluntarily enlist for military service.

== History ==
Unit 300 was formed in the early summer of 1948 by incorporating Druze defectors from the Arab Liberation Army and small numbers of Bedouins and Circassians. The light infantry battalion was attached to the Oded Brigade and took part in Israel's Operation Hiram in October 1948; it fought in every major Arab–Israeli war since. While ethnic Druze comprised the majority of its members, there were also recruits drawn from the Bedouin, Circassian, Christian and Arab Muslim communities. The battalion produced several generals for the Israel Defense Forces (IDF).

The Sword Battalion contained a small elite Sayeret unit within it.

The Druze and Circassian communities are the only ethnic groups in Israel who are subject to mandatory conscription alongside the Jewish majority; however, unlike the conscription system in place for Israeli Jews, which draws both males and females, only males are drafted from the Druze and Circassian minority communities. The conscription of Druze Israelis began shortly after the passing of the State Defense Act of 1949, which called for mandatory military service by all individuals in the country; non-Jews were exempted from this act by the Israeli government. The Druze leadership appealed to Israeli prime minister David Ben-Gurion in the mid-1950s to cancel the Druze exemption and draft Druze men into the Israeli military on the same basis as Jewish men. Originally, they served in the framework of a special unit. Since the 1980s, Druze soldiers have increasingly joined regular combat units of the IDF, and have attained high ranks and commendations for distinguished service. The service-continuation rate of Druze Israeli males stood at 83 percent in 2009. According to IDF statistics, 369 Druze soldiers have been killed in Israeli combat operations since 1948.

There is a long-standing Israeli government policy of encouraging Bedouins to volunteer and offering them various incentives. In some Bedouin communities, a military career is seen as a means of social mobility in Israel. Christian and Muslim Arabs are also accepted as volunteers.

In 1987, Unit 300 was officially renamed to the Sword Battalion.

In May 2015, the IDF revealed its plan to disband the Sword Battalion, after research revealed the vast majority of its recruits would rather integrate into the rest of the military.

== Gallery ==
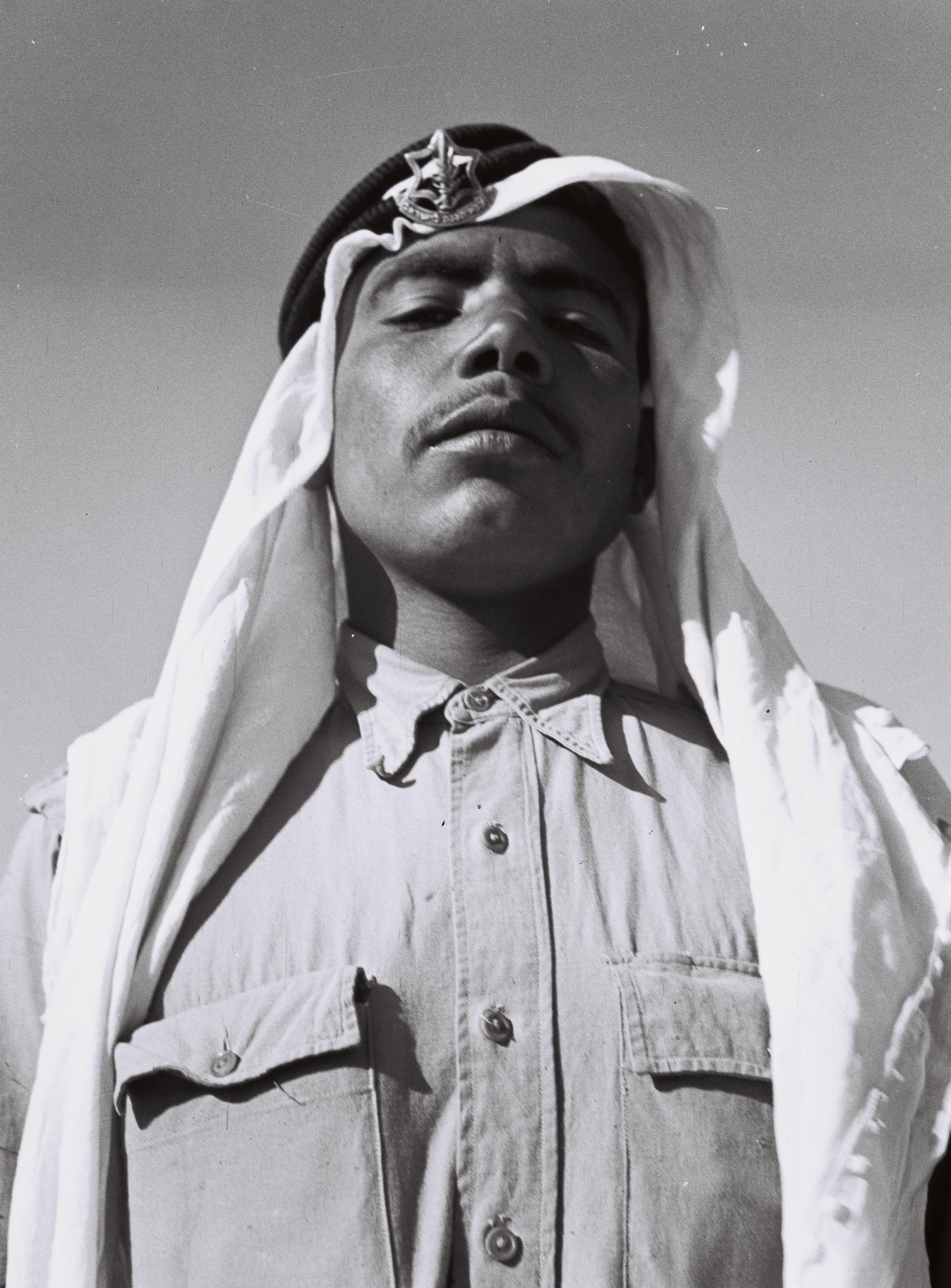
Bedouin soldier serving in one of the minority units of the Israel Defense Forces, May 13, 1949

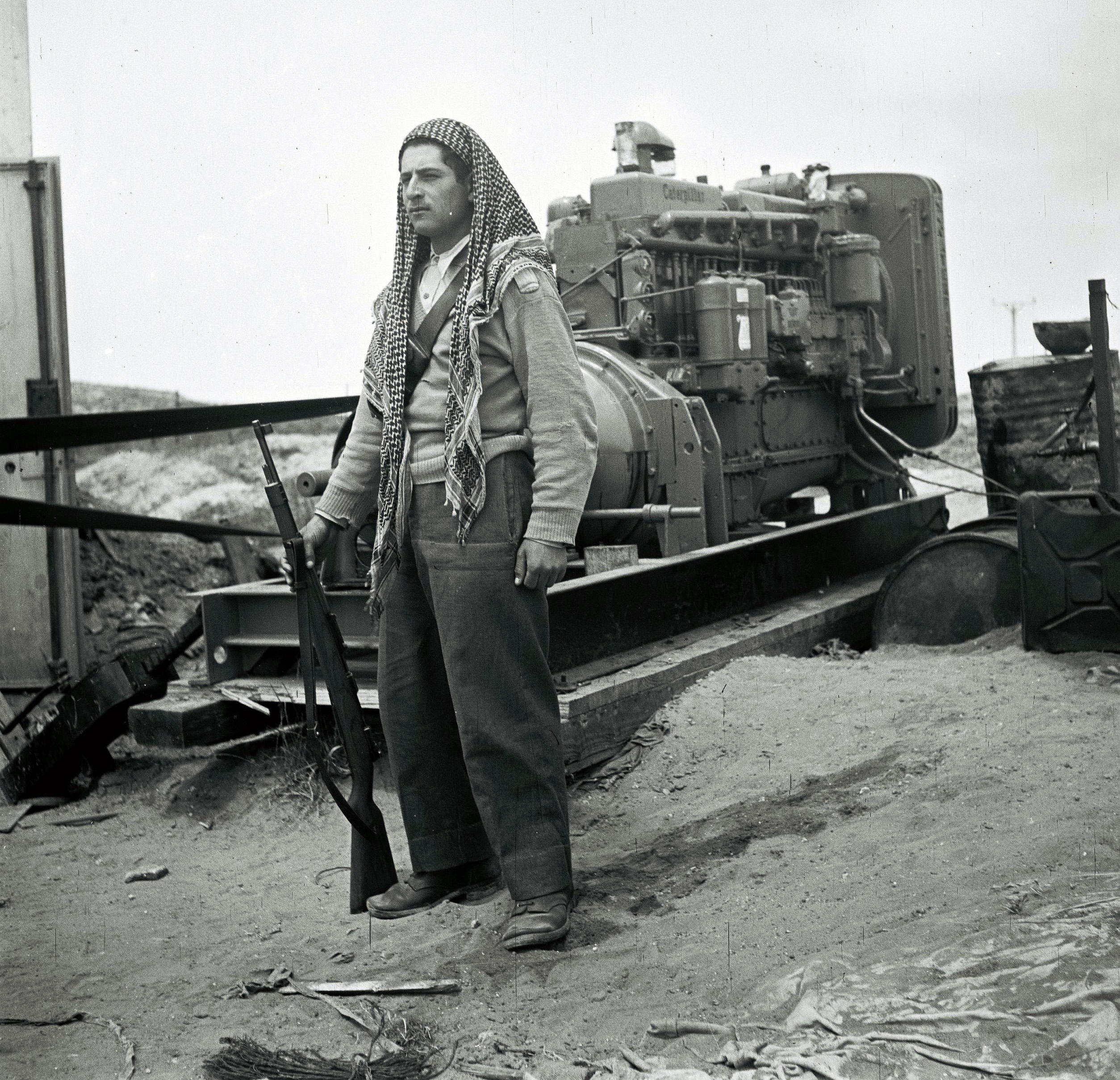
Druze Israeli soldier guarding a mobile power station with a Mauser Kar. 98k rifle, May 13, 1949

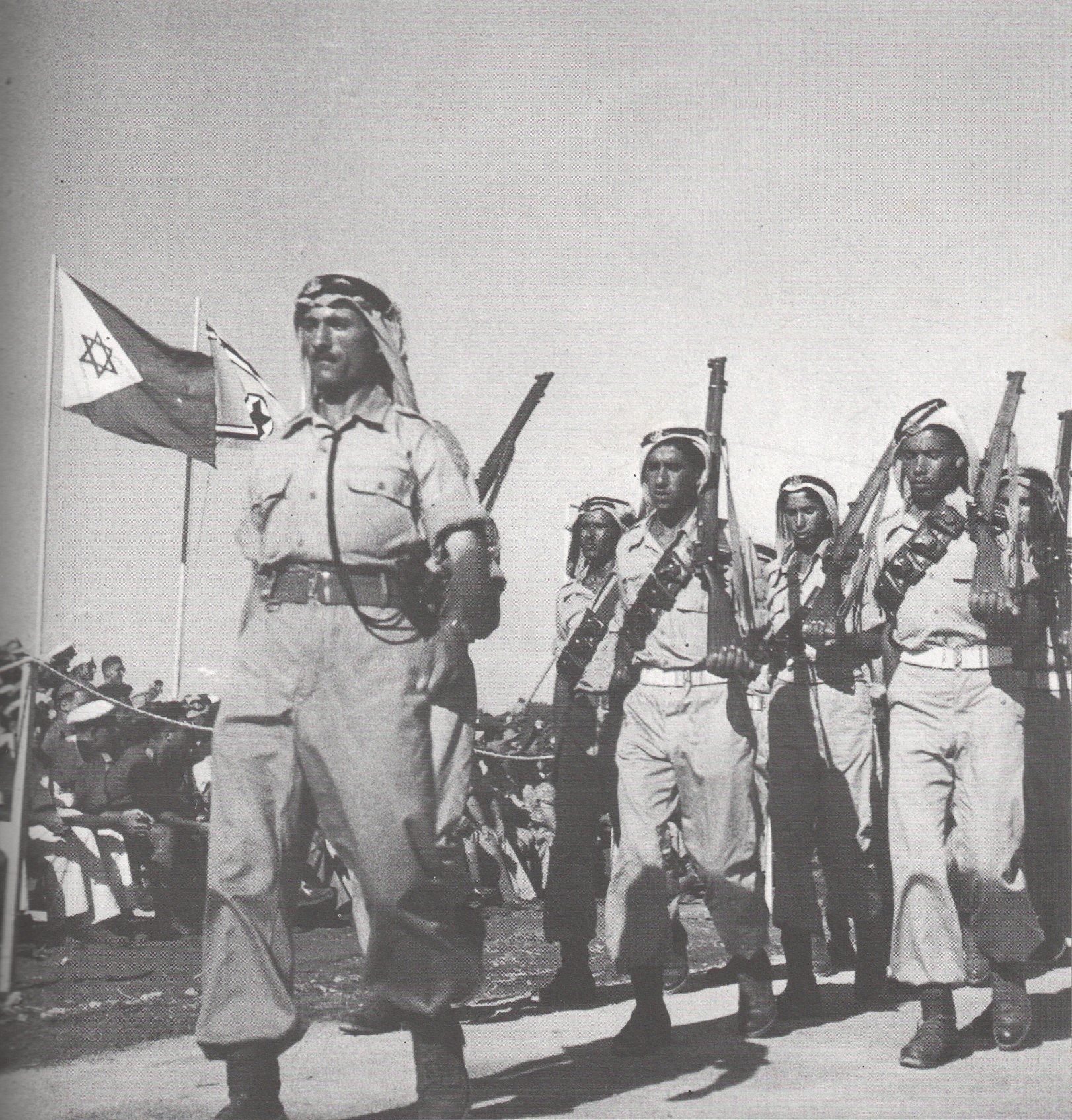
Bedouin Israeli soldiers at a military parade in Tel Aviv in 1949

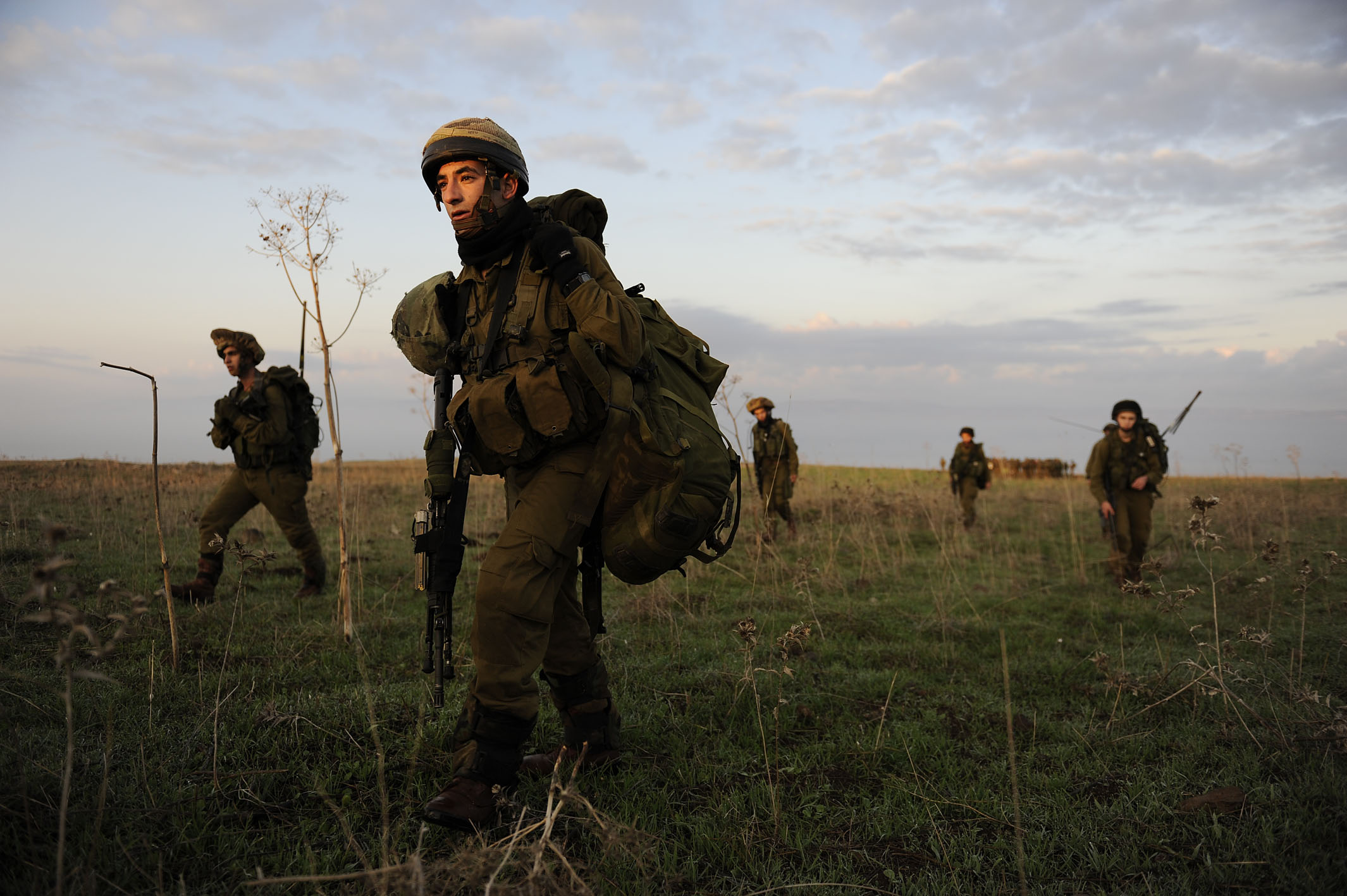
Sword Battalion recruits during a military exercise in northern Israel in 2011

== See also ==
- Arab citizens of Israel
  - Negev Bedouin
- Conscription in Israel
  - Jewish Israelis
  - Druze Israelis
  - Circassian Israelis
