= Al-Ras al-Ahmar =

- Etymology: the red head or hill-top
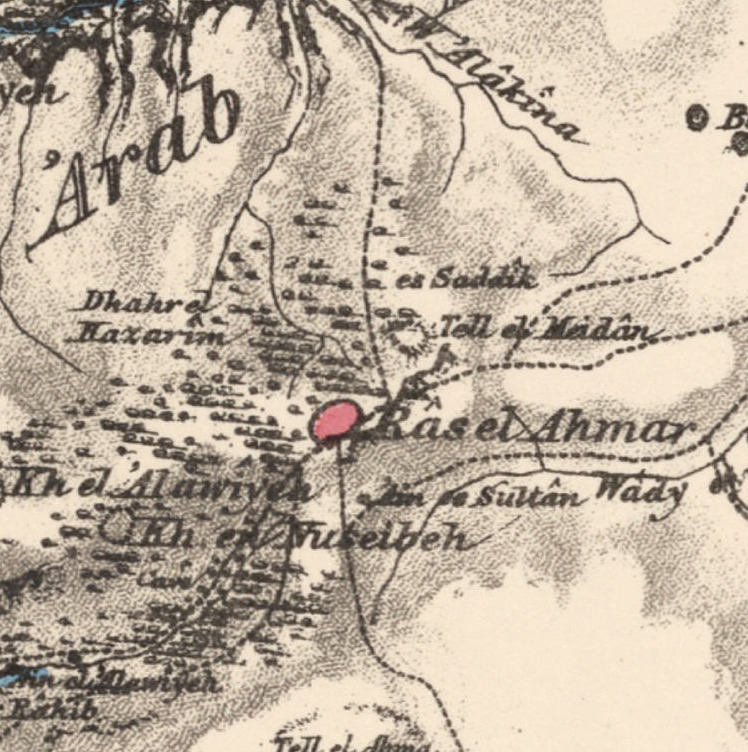
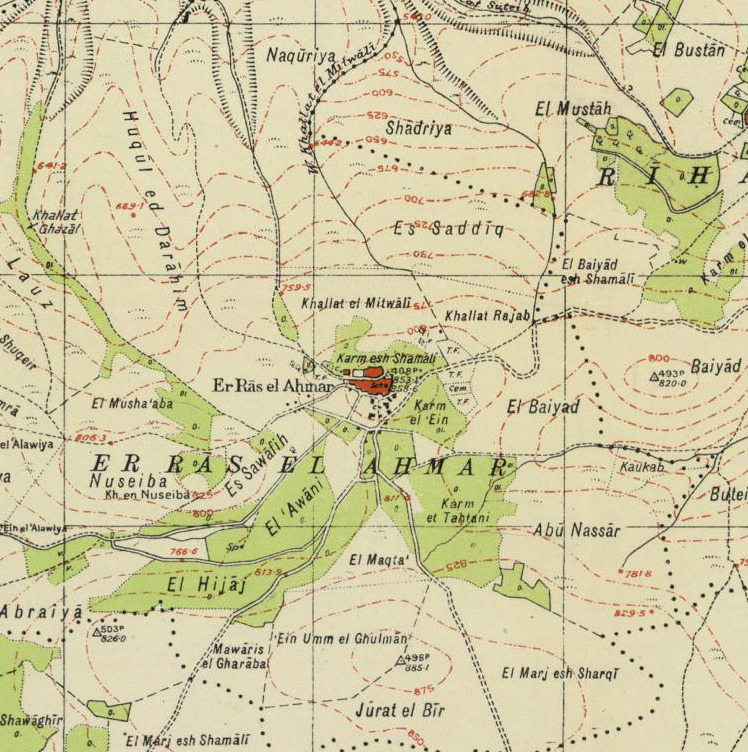
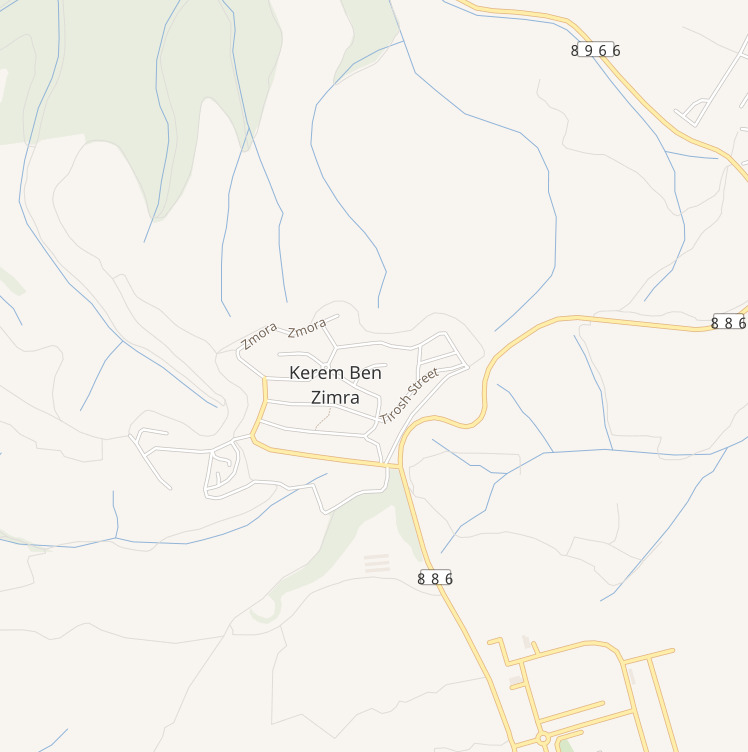
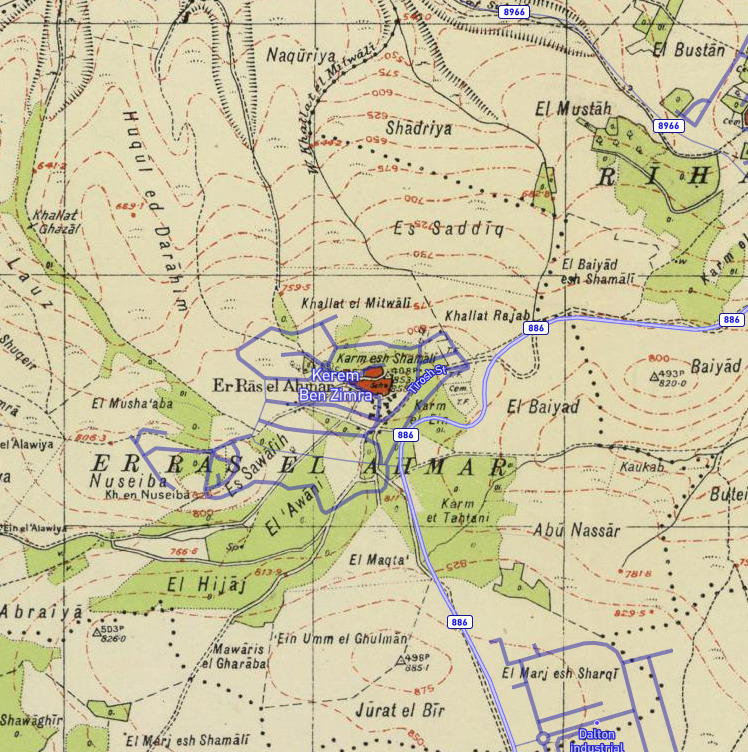
- 1870s map 1940s map modern map 1940s with modern overlay map A series of historical maps of the area around Al-Ras al-Ahmar (click the buttons)

- Location within Mandatory Palestine
- Coordinates: 33°2′21″N 35°28′11″E
- Palestine grid: 194/271
- Geopolitical entity: Mandatory Palestine
- Subdistrict: Safad
- Date of depopulation: October 30, 1948

Area
  - Total: 7,934 dunams (7.934 km^{2}; 3.063 sq mi)

Population (1945)
  - Total: 620
- Cause(s) of depopulation: Military assault by Yishuv forces
- Current Localities: Kerem Ben Zimra

Al-Ras al-Ahmar was a Palestinian Arab village in the Safad Subdistrict. It was depopulated during the 1948 Arab–Israeli War on October 30, 1948, by the Israeli 7th Armored Brigade during Operation Hiram. It was located 8.5 km north of Safad.

== History ==
Remains found in the village indicate that it was populated during the Byzantine era.

=== Ottoman era ===
Incorporated into the Ottoman Empire in 1517 with the rest of Palestine, in 1596 it appeared under the name of Ras al-Ahmar in the tax registers as part of the nahiya (subdistrict) of Jira in the Safad Sanjak. It had an all Muslim population, consisting of 54 households and 22 bachelors; an estimated 418 persons. They paid taxes on agricultural products, including wheat, barley, vineyards, "kirsanna", goats and beehives, in addition to occasional revenues and an olive oil or grape syrup press; the taxes totalled 5,500 akçe. Half of the revenues went to a Waqf.

In 1838 er-Ras al-Ahmar was noted as a village located in the Safad district.

Algerian followers of Abdelkader El Djezairi have been defeated by the French in Algeria, and sought refuge in another part of the Ottoman Empire. They were settled in various locations in Ottoman Syria, including Al-Ras al-Ahmar.

In 1875 Victor Guérin found that the village was situated 844 meters above sea level, and contained 150 Muslims.

In 1881 the PEF's Survey of Western Palestine described the village "Well-built stone houses. containing 350 Algerian Moslems, situated on high hill, with gardens down the slopes. There is a perennial supply of good water in Wâdy Râs el Ahmar."

A population list from about 1887 showed Ras el Ahmar to have about 690 Muslim inhabitants.

=== British Mandate era ===
In the 1922 census of Palestine conducted by the British Mandate authorities, Al-Ras al-Ahmar had a population of 405; all Muslims, increasing slightly in the 1931 census to 447; 6 Christians and 441 Muslims, in a total of 92 houses.

In the 1945 statistics, al-Ras al-Ahmar had a population of 620, all Muslims, and a land area of 7,934 dunams. Of this, 1,008 dunams were plantations and irrigable land, 4,728 were used for cereals, while 61 dunams were classified as built-up, or urban area. An elementary school for boys was founded during this period.

=== 1948, aftermath ===
Ras al-Ahmar was on the border between the territories allotted to the Arab and to the Jewish state under the 1947 UN Partition Plan.

In March 1948, a British medical officer reported that the village of Al-Ras al-Ahmar was completely unprepared for war.

The fall of Safad and the expulsion of its Arab inhabitants in May 1948, "severely undermined" the morale of surrounding villages, including Al-Ras al-Ahmar, according to Haganah Intelligence sources. They reported that the villagers "had decided to abandon their villages if the Arabs of Safad surrender."

In October 1948 Operation Hiram took place, where the operational orders to the Israeli troop were "to occupy the whole of the Galilee”. On the 30 October 1948, the 71st Battalion from the 7th Armored Brigade took Ras al-Ahmar, together with Rehaniya, Alma and Dayshum. Word of the Jish and Safsaf massacres had apparently spread to Ras al-Ahmar, as the village was largely empty when the 7th Brigade arrived.

By mid-June, 1949, the village lands of Al-Ras al-Ahmar were settled by Jewish immigrants as part of the policy of Judaisation of Northern Israel.

In 1992 it was noted about "Some houses still remain. One house has a front stairway, and a covered garage that apparently was added by the Israelis who live there. Another house has two high, arched windows. The site also contains stone rubble from destroyed houses, and a few fig trees and cactuses. The nearby settlement cultivates some of the surrounding land and uses the rest for grazing."

== Bibliography ==
- Barron, J. B., ed. (1923). Palestine: Report and General Abstracts of the Census of 1922. Government of Palestine.
- Conder, C.R.; Kitchener, H. H. (1881). The Survey of Western Palestine: Memoirs of the Topography, Orography, Hydrography, and Archaeology. Vol. 1. London: Committee of the Palestine Exploration Fund.
- Department of Statistics (1945). Village Statistics, April, 1945. Government of Palestine.
- Guérin, V. (1880). Description Géographique Historique et Archéologique de la Palestine (in French). Vol. 3: Galilee, pt. 2. Paris: L'Imprimerie Nationale.
- Hadawi, S. (1970). Village Statistics of 1945: A Classification of Land and Area ownership in Palestine. Palestine Liberation Organization Research Center. Archived from the original on 2018-12-08.
- Hütteroth, W.-D.; Abdulfattah, K. (1977). Historical Geography of Palestine, Transjordan and Southern Syria in the Late 16th Century. Erlanger Geographische Arbeiten, Sonderband 5. Erlangen, Germany: Vorstand der Fränkischen Geographischen Gesellschaft. ISBN 3-920405-41-2.
- Khalidi, W. (1992). All That Remains: The Palestinian Villages Occupied and Depopulated by Israel in 1948. Washington D.C.: Institute for Palestine Studies. ISBN 0-88728-224-5.
- Mills, E., ed. (1932). Census of Palestine 1931. Population of Villages, Towns and Administrative Areas. Jerusalem: Government of Palestine.
- Morris, B. (2004). The Birth of the Palestinian Refugee Problem Revisited. Cambridge University Press. ISBN 978-0-521-00967-6.
- Palmer, E. H. (1881). The Survey of Western Palestine: Arabic and English Name Lists Collected During the Survey by Lieutenants Conder and Kitchener, R. E. Transliterated and Explained by E.H. Palmer. Committee of the Palestine Exploration Fund.
- Rhode, H. (1979). Administration and Population of the Sancak of Safed in the Sixteenth Century. Columbia University. Archived from the original on 2020-03-01.
- Robinson, E.; Smith, E. (1841). Biblical Researches in Palestine, Mount Sinai and Arabia Petraea: A Journal of Travels in the year 1838. Vol. 3. Boston: Crocker & Brewster.
- Schumacher, G. (1888). "Population list of the Liwa of Akka". Quarterly Statement - Palestine Exploration Fund. 20: 169–191.
