= Arab Liberation Army =

Army of multinational Arab volunteers in the 1947–1949 Palestine war

Arab Rescue Army جيش الإنقاذ العربي Jayš al-ʾInqāḏ al-ʿArabiyy
- Emblem of the Arab Liberation Army
- Leader: Fawzi al-Qawuqji
- Dates active: 1947–1949
- Merged into: IDF Minorities Unit (defectors)
- Allegiance: Arab League
- Headquarters: Damascus, Syria
- Active regions: Mandatory Palestine
- Ideology: Arab nationalism Pan-Arabism; Anti-Zionism
- Size: 6,000
- Wars: 1948 Palestine war

The Arab Liberation Army (ALA; Arabic: جيش الإنقاذ العربي Jayš al-ʾInqāḏ al-ʿArabiyy, better translated as Arab Rescue Army (ARA) or Arab Salvation Army (ASA)), was an army of volunteers from Arab countries led by Fawzi al-Qawuqji. It fought on the Arab side in the 1948 Palestine war. It was set up by the Arab League as a counter to the Arab High Committee's Holy War Army, but in fact, the League and Arab governments prevented thousands from joining either force.

At the meeting in Damascus on 5 February 1948 to organize Palestinian Field Commands, Northern Palestine was allocated to Qawuqji's forces although the West Bank was de facto already under the control of Transjordan.

The target figure for recruitment was 10,000, but by mid-March 1948, the number of volunteers having joined the Army had reached around 6,000 and did not increase much beyond that figure. The actual number deployed might have been as low as 3,500, according to General Safwat. Its ranks included mainly Syrians, Lebanese, Palestinians and a few hundreds of Iraqis, Jordanians, Muslim Brotherhood from Egypt, Circassians, and Bosniaks. There were also a few German, Turkish and British deserters.

== Disposition and control of forces ==
The Arab League Military Committee, with headquarters in Damascus, was responsible for the movements and servicing of the Army. The Committee consisted of General Ismail Safwat (Iraq, Commander-in-Chief), General Taha al-Hashimi (Iraq), Colonel Shuqayri (Lebanon), Colonel Muhammed al-Hindi (Syria) and Colonel Abd al-Qadir al-Jundi (Transjordan). All of the countries represented related to King Abdullah's long-held plans to re-form the region of Syria. This Greater Syria Plan (Mashru Suriya al-Kubra) had been supported by the British Empire throughout the thirties and forties.

== Syria's reasons for developing the ALA ==
Syria's reasons for building the Army of Liberation were several. Syria's President Shukri al-Quwatli knew that the Syrian Army was undependable and useless as an instrument of war; therefore, it was much safer for Syria to influence the situation in Palestine by building up a force that was to be paid for and armed by all the Arab League countries. Egypt was to pay for 42% of the costs, Syria and Lebanon 23%, Saudi Arabia 20%, and Iraq the remaining 15%. Just as important as the financial reasons for building an Arab League force was the need to protect the Syrian army itself. By sending the volunteer army into battle, Quwatli hope to spare Syria from exposing its own troops to defeat, which could leave the country exposed to attack from Abdullah and possibly Jewish forces. If the volunteer army were defeated, the loss and embarrassment would be borne by the Arab League in general and the Palestinians in particular, not by Syria alone.

Another advantage to an irregular army was that it could be sent into Palestine well before the British officially withdrew from their mandate on 15 May 1948. None of the Arab states were willing to declare war openly on the British. Thus, Syria would not officially be opening hostilities against the British troops, who still bore responsibility for security in Palestine. Furthermore, if the Arab countries failed to commit their armies to fight in Palestine – a possibility which seemed likely as Egypt agreed to participate only four days before the war began on 15 May 1948 – the Syrian government would still be active. It would retain leverage in Palestine and be able to tell the Syrian public that it had done more than the other Arab countries to help the Palestinians. Most importantly, however, the ALA was to be used as an instrument to nip Abdullah's Greater Syria plan in the bud and to keep him from expanding his state over half of Palestine.

The evolution of President Quwatli's military objectives in Palestine is recorded in the diaries of Taha al-Hashimi. Hashimi was an Iraqi pan-Arab nationalist and long-time intimate of Quwatli, whom the Syrian president wanted to head the Liberation Army rather than General Safwat, Egypt's candidate. Hashimi was ultimately appointed Inspector General of the ALA and placed in charge of recruitment and training of the troops at the Qatana headquarters. His office was in the Syrian Ministry of Defense and he met daily with Syria's political and military leaders.

On 29 November 1947, the United Nations General Assembly voted in support of the Partition Plan to separate the territory of Mandatory Palestine into two states, an Arab one and a Jewish one (UN Resolution 181). Hashimi records that in October 1947, and after Syria had failed to win either Saudi Arabia or Egypt over to the idea of an anti-Hashemite military alliance, Quwatli explained:

The Greater Syria plan will start from the Arab part of Palestine. Because of this I have ordered the Syrian army to move to the Syrian–Palestinian border. The force which has taken up position there is 2,500 men. Also Lebanon will send 1000 men to its border. As soon as the forces of Iraq and Jordan enter Palestine, we will enter and take al-Nasira and the North.[fn]

Quwatli's strategy in Palestine was designed from the outset to prevent Abdullah's possible advance north to Damascus. In the best case, Quwatli hoped to acquire some of northern Palestine for Syria. A second reason for Quwatli's hesitation to commit Syrian military troops was that he had failed in his early efforts to reform the army and questioned the loyalty and effectiveness of its leadership. Although the head of the military, General Abdullah Atfeh, swore to the Minister of Defense in May 1947, that the Syrian army was "the best of all the Arab armies, the best army in the Middle East," the brigade commanders scoffed at this ridiculous assessment and cabled the President to warn, that "the army is not worth a red cent."[fn] Quwatli was fully aware of the problems in his military. "The real problem is to reform the Syrian army and to solve the problem of its leadership," he confided to Taha al-Hashimi in September 1947.[fn]

Until the army could be strengthened, he hoped to keep it out of the fighting. In its stead he built the Arab Liberation Army. "It is imperative that we restrict our efforts to the popular movement in Palestine," Quwatli concluded. "We must strengthen it and organize its affairs as quickly as possible."[fn] Prime Minister Jamil Mardam Bey gave a lengthier explanation for why the Syrian army could not be sent into Palestine in November 1947, and why a volunteer army was needed.

Because [the Arab governments are undependable], I have decided... on the necessity of strengthening Palestine with arms and men and organizing their affairs and appointing a leader to take charge of their matters. The popular movement in Palestine is responsible for saving the situation, with the help of the Arab governments. This is because I doubt in the unity of the Arab armies and their ability to fight together....

If the Arab armies, not least of all the Syrian army, are hit with an overwhelming surprise attack by the Jewish Haganah, it would lead to such a loss of reputation that the Arab governments would never be able to recover.

The best thing is to leave the work to the Palestinians and to supply them with the help of the Arab governments. Ensuring an effective leadership in Palestine is of paramount importance and needs to be done with the greatest of haste. If the movement is destined to failure, God forbid, then it will be the people of Palestine who fail and not the Arab governments and their armies. So long as the position of the Kings and Amirs is one of caution and plots, this is the only sound policy.[fn]

As Mardam makes clear, he knew the Syrian army could not withstand an attack by the Haganah; he knew his Arab allies were undependable; and he did not want to risk the "loss of reputation" that would inevitably ensue. That is why he and Quwatli were determined to limit their own involvement in Palestine to the ALA.

When Hashimi spoke to the President a few days later about Mardam's plan, President Quwatli reiterated Mardam's concern that the government could not withstand the Syrian army's defeat in Palestine. As he had explained to Hashimi before, "the real problem is with reforming the Syrian army and solving the problem of its leadership."[59] Because of these concerns, he said, "it is imperative that we restrict our efforts to the popular movement in Palestine. We must strengthen it and organize its affairs as quickly as possible. The trouble is that the Mufti [Hajj Amin al-Husayni] will not permit Fawzi al-Qawuqji to take the leadership in Palestine."[fn]

The next several weeks of intense negotiations between Quwatli, the Mufti, Qawuqji and other Arab leaders over the question of who would direct the popular resistance in Palestine were a complete failure; agreement was impossible. The Mufti refused to hand control over to Qawuqji. He claimed that Qawuqji would "sell" himself to the English, and added that, "if Qawuqji accepted partition, [I] will kill him with [my] own hands."[fn] The Mufti insisted that Palestine did not need the volunteer army and that all money should be given directly to him.[fn] King Abdullah, in an effort to dismiss the Mufti, claimed he could save Palestine on his own. "Why don't the Arab countries send their armies directly to [me]?" he inquired. Meanwhile, Abdullah was arming his own supporters in Palestine who rejected both the Mufti and Qawuqji.[fn] As for King Faruq of Egypt, he wanted nothing to do with any of them. He said, "The Arabs ought to get rid of all three of them: the Mufti, Abdullah, and Qawuqji."[fn] The question of who would take command of the Arab and Palestinian military campaign and what their objectives would be was never resolved.

== Entry into Palestine ==
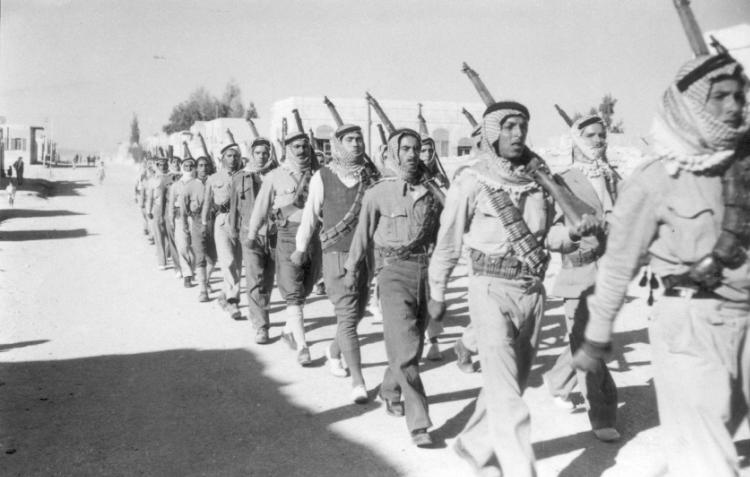
ALA on parade, 1948

On January 8, 1948, the borders of British-held Palestine were breached by a battalion of the ALA – "the Second Yarmuk Battalion" which was 330-soldiers strong and was commanded by Adib Shishakli. Entering from Syria, the battalion set its headquarters near Tarshiha in the Galilee. On January 20, 1948, this battalion attacked Kibbutz Yehiam and failed. The British High Commissioner Alan Cunningham asked his government to pressure Syria to stop the invasion of the mandate territory by the ALA by threatening that the British Army would take action. On January 20, 1948, a second ALA Battalion, a 630-soldier-strong First Yarmuk battalion, led by the Syrian officer Mohammed Safa, entered Palestine. It crossed the Damia Bridge over the Jordan River in a long convoy. An attempt by the British police to prevent their entry failed because of the intervention of the Arab Legion, and so the invasion was not stopped by the British in spite of protests from the Jewish Agency. Fawzi al-Qawuqji joined this regiment, which was parked near Tubas. On February 15, 1948, the battalion attacked Kibbutz Tirat Zvi but failed to overtake it. The Hittin Battalion, led by the Iraqi Madlul Abbas, crossed the Jordan River on the Damia bridge on 29 January 1948 and dispersed in the mountains of Samaria. The two battalions that had come from Transjordan split into smaller units and deployed throughout Samaria. Their task was to maintain order in the area and allow Abdullah I of Jordan to annex the area to his kingdom. Attempts by the Arab Higher Committee to sow discord between the units of the ALA were unsuccessful. Paradoxically, Samaria remained one of the quieter areas in Palestine during this period thanks to the ALA. The move was made in coordination with Ernest Bevin who approved of Abdullah's plan to deploy the ALA through Samaria without the knowledge of the High Commissioner, provided it does not provoke intervention by the UN Security Council or accrue criticism from other Arab countries against the United Kingdom. According to Levenberg, this disposition of forces, away from the main warfare areas and close to the Syrian border, where it could create a buffer between Syria and Transjordanian forces, indicates their real objectives and missions.

Qawuqji returned to Syria to organize further forces and in March 1948 re-entered Palestine from Syria with the "Al Hussein," and "Al Qadsia" battalions, numbering 360 soldiers each. A final "Jabal al-Arab" battalion manned by 500 Druze soldiers and commanded by Shakib Wahab settled in Shfar'am.

The Druze forces took part in the battle of Ramat Yohanan. Following the fierce battle that inflicted many casualties on both sides, the battalion commanders reached an agreement with the Haganah to withdraw. Some members of the battalion, led by Ismail Qabalan, later fled from Syria and volunteered to the IDF to form the basis of its Druze forces.

On 5 March 1948 Qawuqji returned to Palestine and set his headquarters in the Jaba village between Nablus and Jenin. He also set up a radio station broadcasting propaganda in Hebrew, Arabic and English. On April 4, 1948, the ALA forces attacked Kibbutz Mishmar Haemek in order to take it and join forces with the Arabs of Haifa. The campaign lasted for ten days and ended in defeat for the ALA. In Parallel, the battalion led be Sishakli was defeated in the battle for Safed during Operation Yiftach. In addition to these battles, ALA units fought in other areas, such as the battle of Jerusalem and the road leading to it, the Sharon, and urban fighting in mixed-population cities such as Jaffa. In some places these forces showed firm opposition to Jewish militias, such as at the battle of Nabi Samuel and Tel Arish. Regardless, on May 27, 1948, Qawuqji led his northern forces back to Syria to regroup.

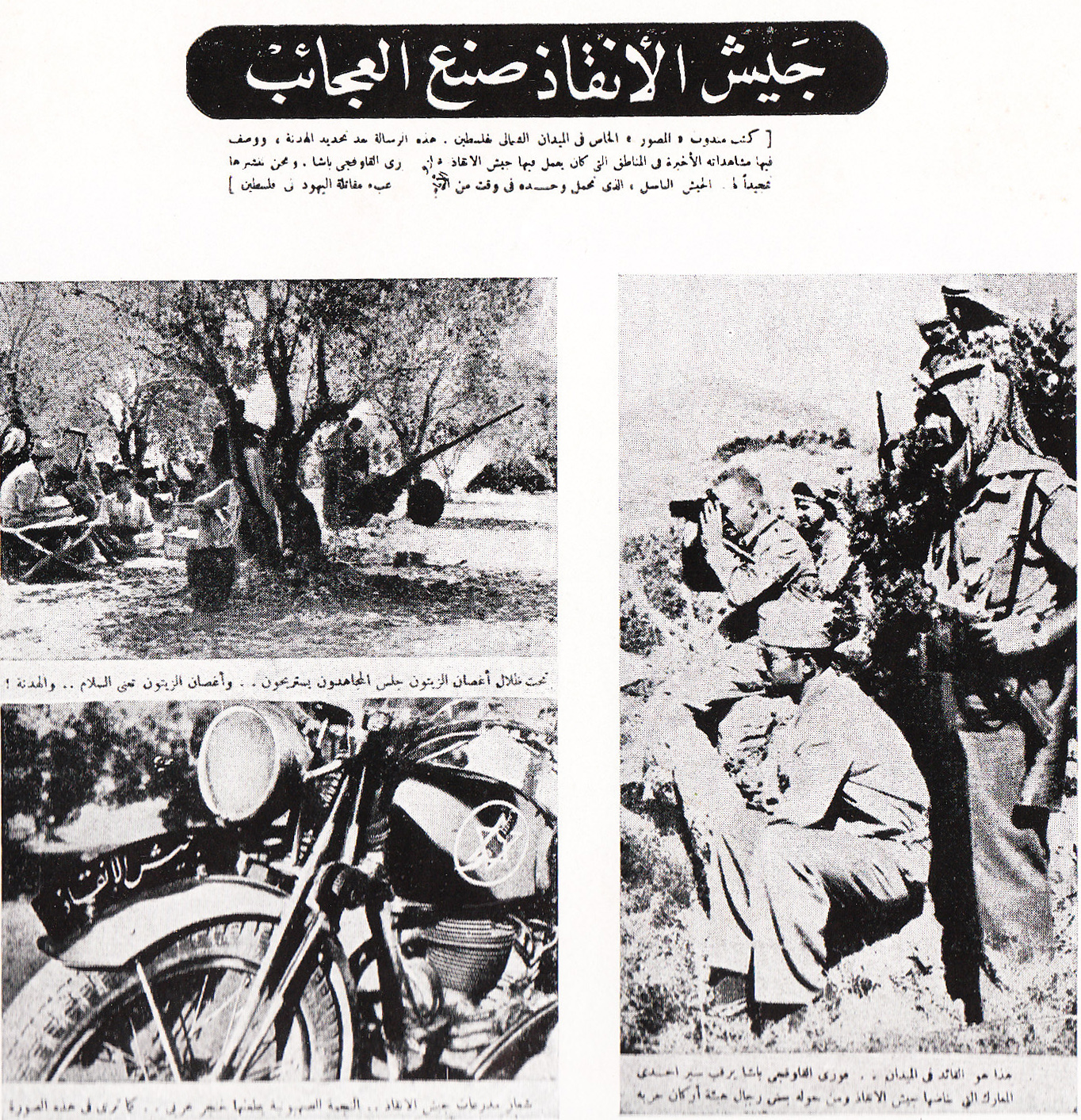

=== The last stages of the war ===
In June 1948 the ALA returned to the Galilee and took part in retaking Malkiya, on June 5. During the "ten days battles" ALA forces based in Tarshiha attacked Jewish forces in Sejera but had to retreat when Nazareth was occupied by the IDF. During the second truce the ALA remained active taking, for example, several outposts near Moshav Manof. In October 1948 the ALA succeeded in taking the post of Sheikh Abed near Manara and a counterattack by the Carmeli Brigade failed. In response, the IDF initiated Operation Hiram to rout the ALA from its strongholds in the Galilee. The operation began as the ALA's headquarters at Tarshiha's was attacked and captured by IDF forces, including the newly established Israeli Air Force. Kaukji, though, managed to escape with most of his army. Although the ALA suffered hundreds of casualties it left Palestine to Lebanon largely intact. The ALA never returned to Palestine and was dismantled in the following months.

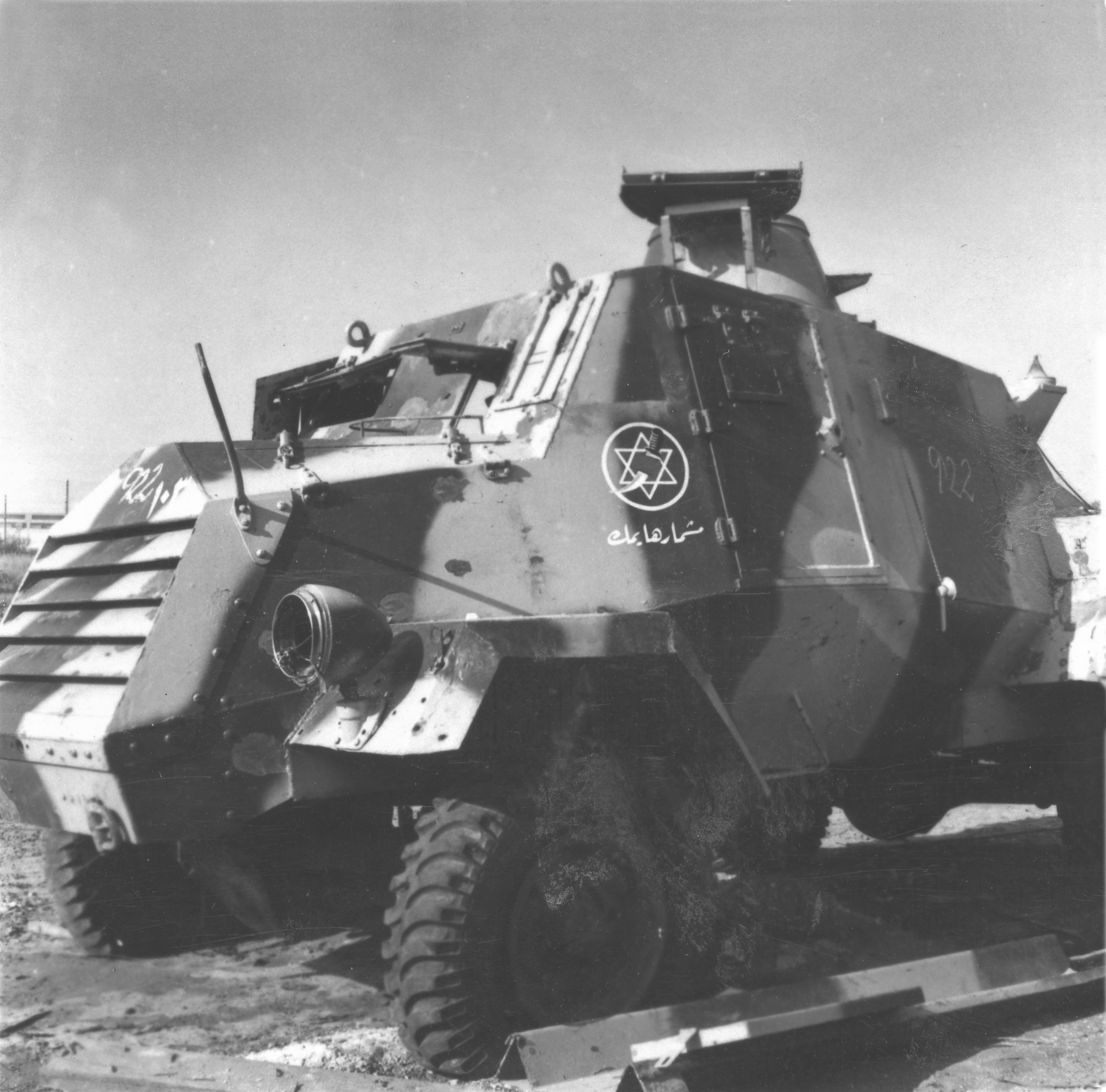
An Otter armored car captured by the Haganah from the ALA (Arab Liberation Army- Kaukji's army) in 1948.

Disposition of Arab Liberation Army Forces, March 1948
Samaria	3,000–4,000
Galilee	1,000, in groups of 50–100 under a central command
Haifa	200–300
Jerusalem city	a few hundreds
Jerusalem district	perhaps 500
Jaffa town	200 or more
Gaza Subdistrict	perhaps 100 Egyptians
Source: Levenberg (1993), p. 200

== The Unit of the Minorities ==
In the early summer of 1948 some Druze fighters, mainly from Syria, along with Druze from the villages of Daliyat al-Karmil and Isfiya on Mount Carmel, defected from the Arab Liberation Army to the Israel Defense Forces. These formed the core of the IDF's only Arabic-speaking unit, the Unit of the Minorities.

== See also ==
- Palestine Liberation Army

== Bibliography ==
- Aruri, Naseer Hasan (1972). Jordan: A Study in Political Development (1923–1965). Springer. ISBN 90-247-1217-3
- Gelber, Yoav (1997). Jewish-Transjordanian Relations 1921–48: Alliance of Bars Sinister. London: Routledge. ISBN 978-0-7146-4675-6
- Gelber, Yoav (2004). Israeli-Jordanian Dialogue, 1948–1953: Cooperation, Conspiracy, or Collusion?. Sussex Academic Press.
- Gelber, Yoav (2004) "Independence Versus Nakba"; Kinneret Zmora-Bitan Dvir Publishing, ISBN 965-517-190-6
- Gelber, Yoav (2006). Palestine 1948. War, Escape and the Emergence of the Palestinian Refugee Problem. Sussex Academic Press. ISBN 978-1-84519-075-0
- Landis, Joshua, (2001). "Syria in the 1948 Palestine War: Fighting King Abdullah’s Greater Syria Plan,” in Eugene Rogan and Avi Shlaim, (Eds.), "Rewriting the Palestine War: 1948 and the History of the Arab-Israeli Conflict," pp. 178–205. Cambridge: Cambridge University Press. ISBN 0-521-79476-5
- Levenberg, Haim (1993). Military Preparations of the Arab Community in Palestine: 1945–1948. London: Routledge. ISBN 0-7146-3439-5
- Morris, Benny (2008), 1948: The First Arab-Israeli War, Yale University Press, New Haven, ISBN 978-0-300-12696-9
- Oren, Michael, Six Days of War, Random House Ballantine Publishing Group, (New York 2003, ISBN 0-345-46192-4
- Parsons, Laila (2001). The Druze and the birth of Israel. In Eugene L. Rogan and Avi Shalim (Eds.). The War for Palestine (pp. 60–78). Cambridge: Cambridge University Press. ISBN 0-521-79476-5
- Sayigh, Yezid (2000). Armed Struggle and the Search for State: The Palestinian National Movement, 1949–1993. Oxford: Oxford University Press. ISBN 0-19-829643-6
