= Sabalan, Safad =

Sabalan سبلان
- Village
- Etymology: Neby Sebelan; the prophet Sebelan
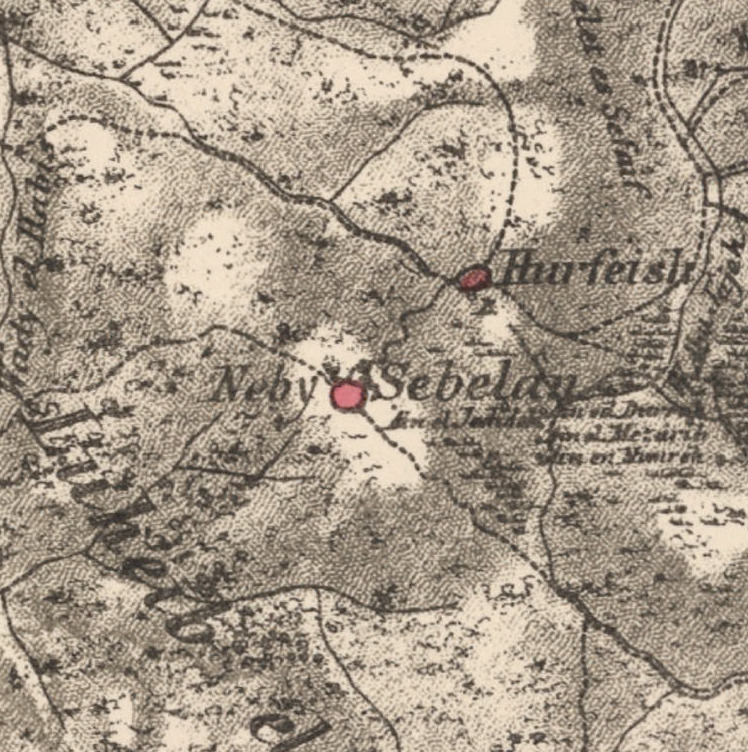
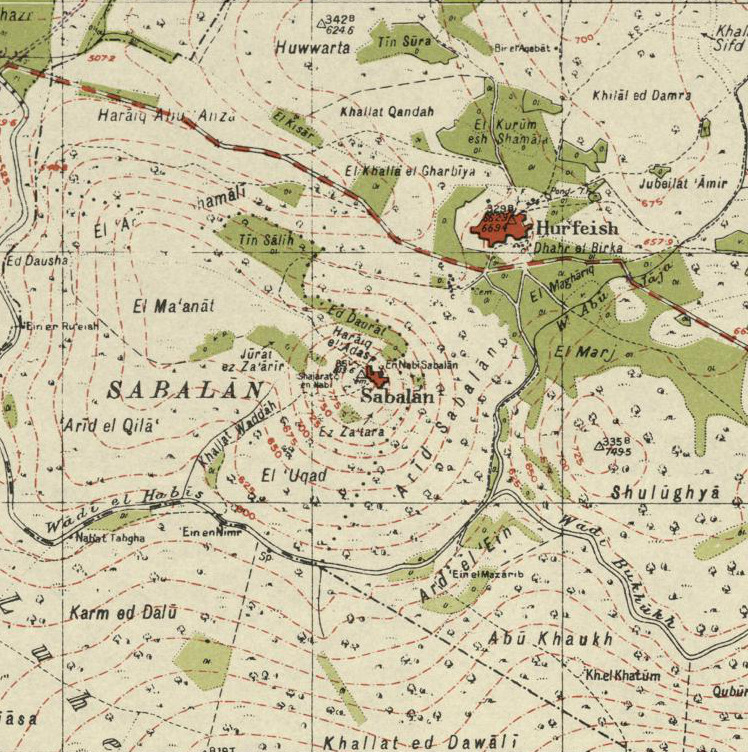
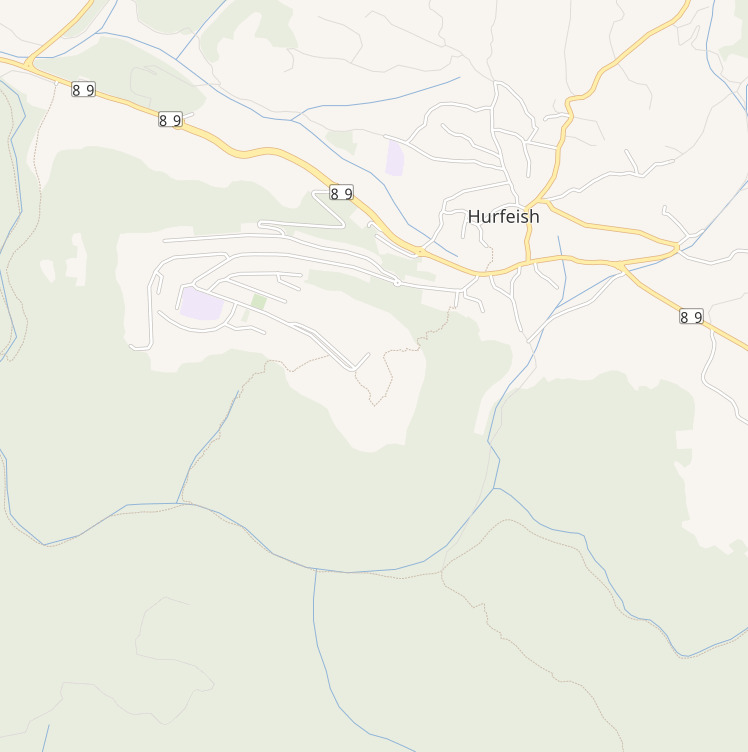
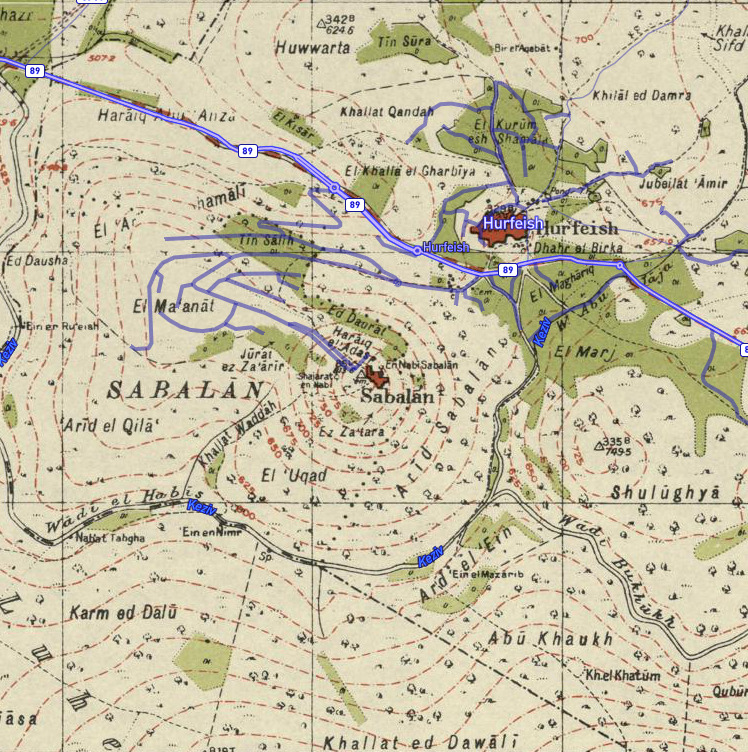
- 1870s map 1940s map modern map 1940s with modern overlay map A series of historical maps of the area around Sabalan, Safad (click the buttons)

- Location within Mandatory Palestine
- Coordinates: 33°0′42″N 35°20′29″E
- Palestine grid: 182/268
- Geopolitical entity: Mandatory Palestine
- Subdistrict: Safad
- Date of depopulation: October 30, 1948

Area
  - Total: 1,798 dunams (1.798 km^{2}; 0.694 sq mi)

Population (1945)
  - Total: 70
- Current Localities: None

Sabalan (Arabic: سبلان, Sabalân) was a Palestinian Arab village in the Safad Subdistrict, located 15.5 kilometers (9.6 mi) northwest of Safad. It stood at an elevation of 800 meters (2,600 ft) above sea level overlooking the Druze village of Hurfeish (now a Druze town). In 1945, Sabalan had a population of 70. It was depopulated during the 1948 Palestine War.

== History ==
According to Muhammad Fahour, a former resident of Sabalan, the village was founded during the French campaign in Syria (1798–1801) when Suleiman al-Bahiri, an Egyptian officer from Egyptian, decided to escape to Palestine after Napoleon declared war on Egypt. Following a recurrent dream he had, he decided to settle on Mount Sabalan.

In 1881, the PEF's Survey of Western Palestine (SWP) described 'Neby Sebelan' as "a village, built of stone, surrounding the tomb of the Neby Sebalan; containing about 100 Moslems; on top of high hill, with figs, olives, and arable land. There are four good springs to the east, besides cisterns." Some believe Sabalan is supposed to be Zebulun, the son of Jacob, while others claim he was a da'i ("missionary") who joined the Druze religion and helped promote it in the region. Archaeological artifacts, namely rock-cut tombs are located near the tomb. A population list from about 1887 showed 'Nebi Abu Sebalan' to have about 75 inhabitants; all Muslims.

=== British Mandate era ===
In the British Mandate period, it had a circular plan with most of its houses being closely clustered together. Because of the steep slopes that surrounded Sabalan, the village was only able to expand on its northwestern end. Although the tomb of Nabi Sabalan was sacred to the Druze, at the centre of the village stood a mosque.

In the 1922 census of Palestine Sabalan had a population of 68; all Muslims, increasing in the 1931 census, to 94 Muslims, living in 18 houses.

By 1945 the population was 70 Muslims, and the village consisted of 1,798 dunams of land, according to an official land and population survey. Of this, a total of 421 dunams were used for cereals; 144 dunams were irrigated or used for plantations, while a 14 dunams were built-up (urban) areas.

=== 1948, aftermath ===
On October 30, 1948, during the Israeli offensive Operation Hiram, Sabalan was captured. Units of Israel's Golani Brigade overran the village with support from the Sheva Brigade as they were advancing along the road leading from Suhmata and Sa'sa'. No Jewish localities were built on village lands, According to Palestinian historian, Walid Khalidi, "Only one village house and a well remain." The remaining house is occupied by the Druze guards and caretakers of the Nabi Sabalan tomb and new buildings were constructed to accommodate pilgrims and visitors. In 1965, Druze youth activists led by the poet Samih al-Qasim protested the confiscation of the lands surrounding the tomb by the Israeli government, which declared them "state lands". The Druze religious leadership established Eid al-Nabi Sabalan (Feast of the Prophet Sabalan) in 1971.

Today, the lands of the village, including the holy shrine, were annexed to the Druze town of Hurfeish. A neighborhood for released soldiers was built there.

== Bibliography ==
- Barron, J. B., ed. (1923). Palestine: Report and General Abstracts of the Census of 1922. Government of Palestine.
- Conder, C.R.; Kitchener, H.H. (1881). The Survey of Western Palestine: Memoirs of the Topography, Orography, Hydrography, and Archaeology. Vol. 1. London: Committee of the Palestine Exploration Fund.
- Department of Statistics (1945). Village Statistics, April, 1945. Government of Palestine.
- Firro, Kais (1999). The Druzes in the Jewish state: a brief history. BRILL. ISBN 90-04-11251-0.
- Hadawi, S. (1970). Village Statistics of 1945: A Classification of Land and Area ownership in Palestine. Palestine Liberation Organization Research Center. Archived from the original on 2018-12-08.
- Khalidi, W. (1992). All That Remains: The Palestinian Villages Occupied and Depopulated by Israel in 1948. Washington D.C.: Institute for Palestine Studies. ISBN 0-88728-224-5.
- Mills, E., ed. (1932). Census of Palestine 1931. Population of Villages, Towns and Administrative Areas. Jerusalem: Government of Palestine.
- Morris, B. (2004). The Birth of the Palestinian Refugee Problem Revisited. Cambridge University Press. ISBN 978-0-521-00967-6.
- Palmer, E.H. (1881). The Survey of Western Palestine: Arabic and English Name Lists Collected During the Survey by Lieutenants Conder and Kitchener, R. E. Transliterated and Explained by E.H. Palmer. Committee of the Palestine Exploration Fund.
- Schumacher, G. (1888). "Population list of the Liwa of Akka". Quarterly Statement - Palestine Exploration Fund. 20: 169–191.
- Swayd, Sami S. (2006). Historical dictionary of the Druzes. Rowman & Littlefield. ISBN 0-8108-5332-9.
