= Fara, Safad =

Fara فارة
- Village
- Etymology: Farah, the highest parts of a mountain
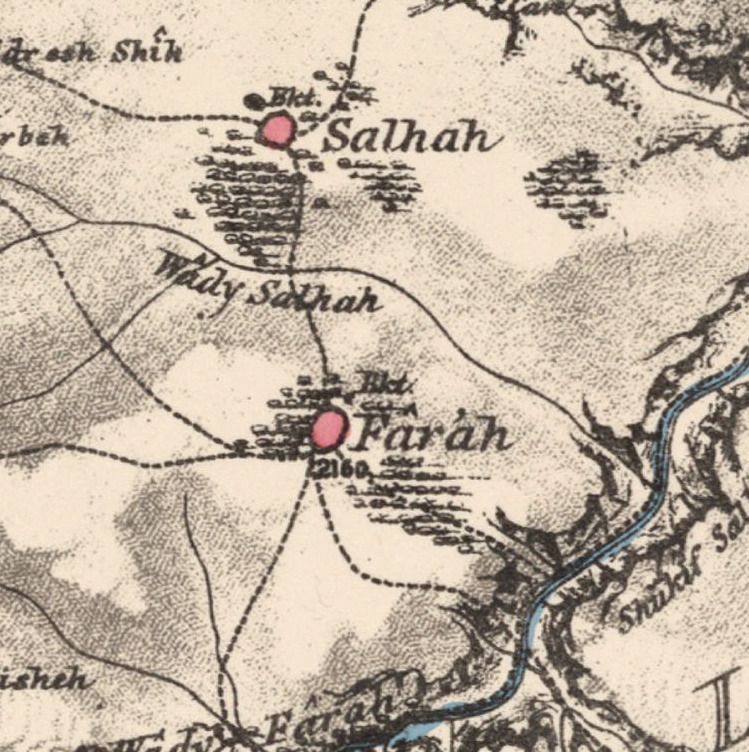
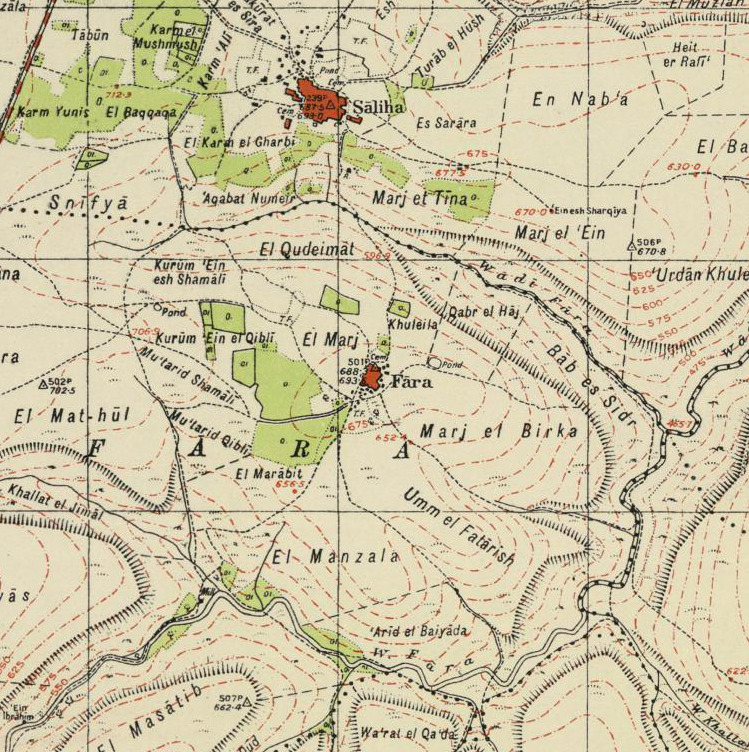
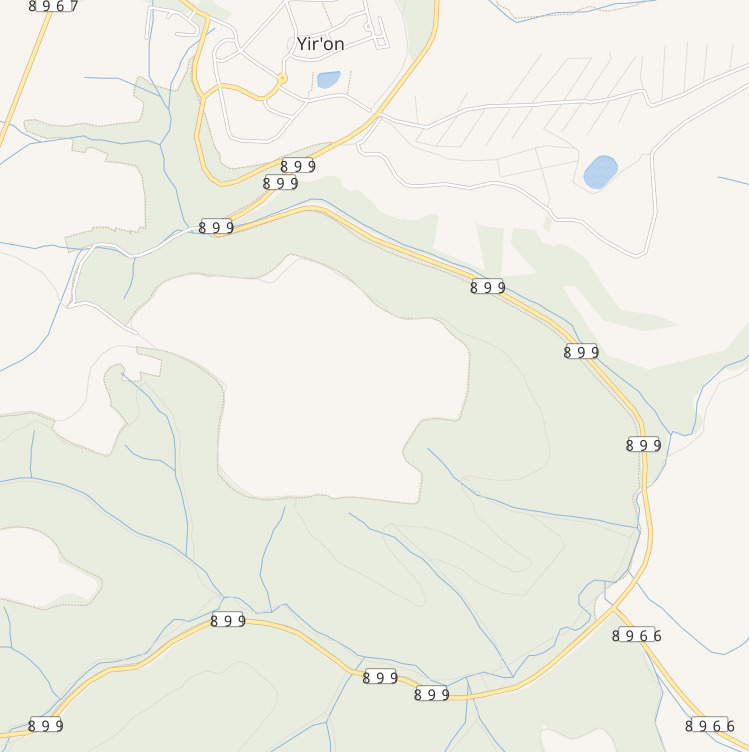
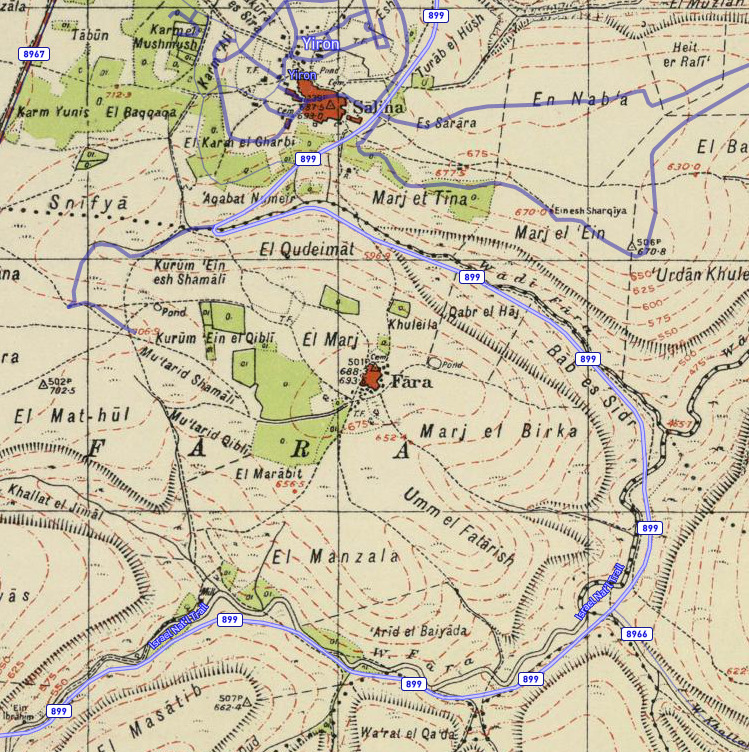
- 1870s map 1940s map modern map 1940s with modern overlay map A series of historical maps of the area around Fara, Safad (click the buttons)

- Location within Mandatory Palestine
- Coordinates: 33°03′57″N 35°27′29″E
- Palestine grid: 193/274
- Geopolitical entity: Mandatory Palestine
- Subdistrict: Safad
- Date of depopulation: October 30, 1948

Area
  - Total: 7,229 dunams (7.229 km^{2}; 2.791 sq mi)

Population (1945)
  - Total: 320
- Cause(s) of depopulation: Military assault by Yishuv forces

Fara (Arabic: فارة) was a Palestinian Arab village in the Safad Subdistrict. It was depopulated during the 1948 Arab-Israeli War on October 30, 1948, under Operation Hiram. It was located 11.5 km north of Safad on the Wadi al-Fara.

== History ==
According to the PEF's Survey of Western Palestine (SWP) this place seems to be the most probable site of Caphar Farara (or Farawa), where was the tomb of R. Nahum of Gimzo, as mentioned in the various Jewish itineraries from 1210 to 1664 CE.

=== Ottoman era ===
During the early Ottoman era in 1596, Fara was part of the nahiyah ("subdistrict") of Jira, part of the Liwa ("district") of Safad. It had a population of 40 households and 11 bachelors; an estimated 281 persons, all Muslim. They paid a fixed tax rate of 25% on agricultural products, including wheat, barley, olive trees, vineyards, goats and beehives, in addition to occasional revenues and a press for olive oil or grape syrup; a total of 3,832 akçe. Half of the revenues went to a waqf.

In 1838 Farah was noted as a village in the Safad district, while in 1881 the SWP described Farah as having "Mud and basalt houses, containing about 100 Moslems. It is situated on a plain, cultivated as arable land. Water from Wady Far'ah and from cisterns and birket." The villagers cultivated olive and fig trees and vineyards.

A population list from about 1887 showed Farah to have an estimated 385 Muslim inhabitants.

=== British Mandate era ===
In the 1922 census of Palestine conducted by the British Mandate authorities, "Fara" had a population of 218, all Muslims except 1 Christian, increasing slightly in the 1931 census to 229, all Muslims, in a total of 42 houses.

In the 1944/5 statistics it had a population of 320 Muslims, with a total of 7,229 dunums of land. Of this, 3,738 were used for cereal, 173 were irrigated or used for orchards, while 38 dunams were classified as built-up (urban), land.

=== 1948, aftermath ===
In 1992 the village site was described: "One stone building (probably a mosque) stands on the site, as well as several stone terraces. On the whole, however, the site is overgrown with grass and fig trees. Less than 1 km north of it lies the settlement of Yir'on. A portion of the land around the village is planted with fruit trees, such as apples, but the land along the valley’s slope is deserted and uncultivated."

== Bibliography ==
- Barron, J.B., ed. (1923). Palestine: Report and General Abstracts of the Census of 1922. Government of Palestine.
- Conder, C.R.; Kitchener, H.H. (1881). The Survey of Western Palestine: Memoirs of the Topography, Orography, Hydrography, and Archaeology. Vol. 1. London: Committee of the Palestine Exploration Fund.
- Government of Palestine, Department of Statistics (1945). Village Statistics, April, 1945.
- Hadawi, S. (1970). Village Statistics of 1945: A Classification of Land and Area ownership in Palestine. Palestine Liberation Organization Research Center.
- Hütteroth, W.-D.; Abdulfattah, K. (1977). Historical Geography of Palestine, Transjordan and Southern Syria in the Late 16th Century. Erlanger Geographische Arbeiten, Sonderband 5. Erlangen, Germany: Vorstand der Fränkischen Geographischen Gesellschaft. ISBN 3-920405-41-2.
- Khalidi, W. (1992). All That Remains: The Palestinian Villages Occupied and Depopulated by Israel in 1948. Washington D.C.: Institute for Palestine Studies. ISBN 0-88728-224-5.
- Mills, E., ed. (1932). Census of Palestine 1931. Population of Villages, Towns and Administrative Areas. Jerusalem: Government of Palestine.
- Morris, B. (2004). The Birth of the Palestinian Refugee Problem Revisited. Cambridge University Press. ISBN 978-0-521-00967-6.
- Palmer, E.H. (1881). The Survey of Western Palestine: Arabic and English Name Lists Collected During the Survey by Lieutenants Conder and Kitchener, R. E. Transliterated and Explained by E.H. Palmer. Committee of the Palestine Exploration Fund.
- Rhode, H. (1979). Administration and Population of the Sancak of Safed in the Sixteenth Century (PhD). Columbia University. Archived from the original on 2020-03-01.
- Robinson, E.; Smith, E. (1841). Biblical Researches in Palestine, Mount Sinai and Arabia Petraea: A Journal of Travels in the year 1838. Vol. 3. Boston: Crocker & Brewster.
- Schumacher, G. (1888). "Population list of the Liwa of Akka". Quarterly Statement - Palestine Exploration Fund. 20: 169–191.
