= Moshe Carmel =

Israeli soldier and politician (1911–2003)

- משה כרמל
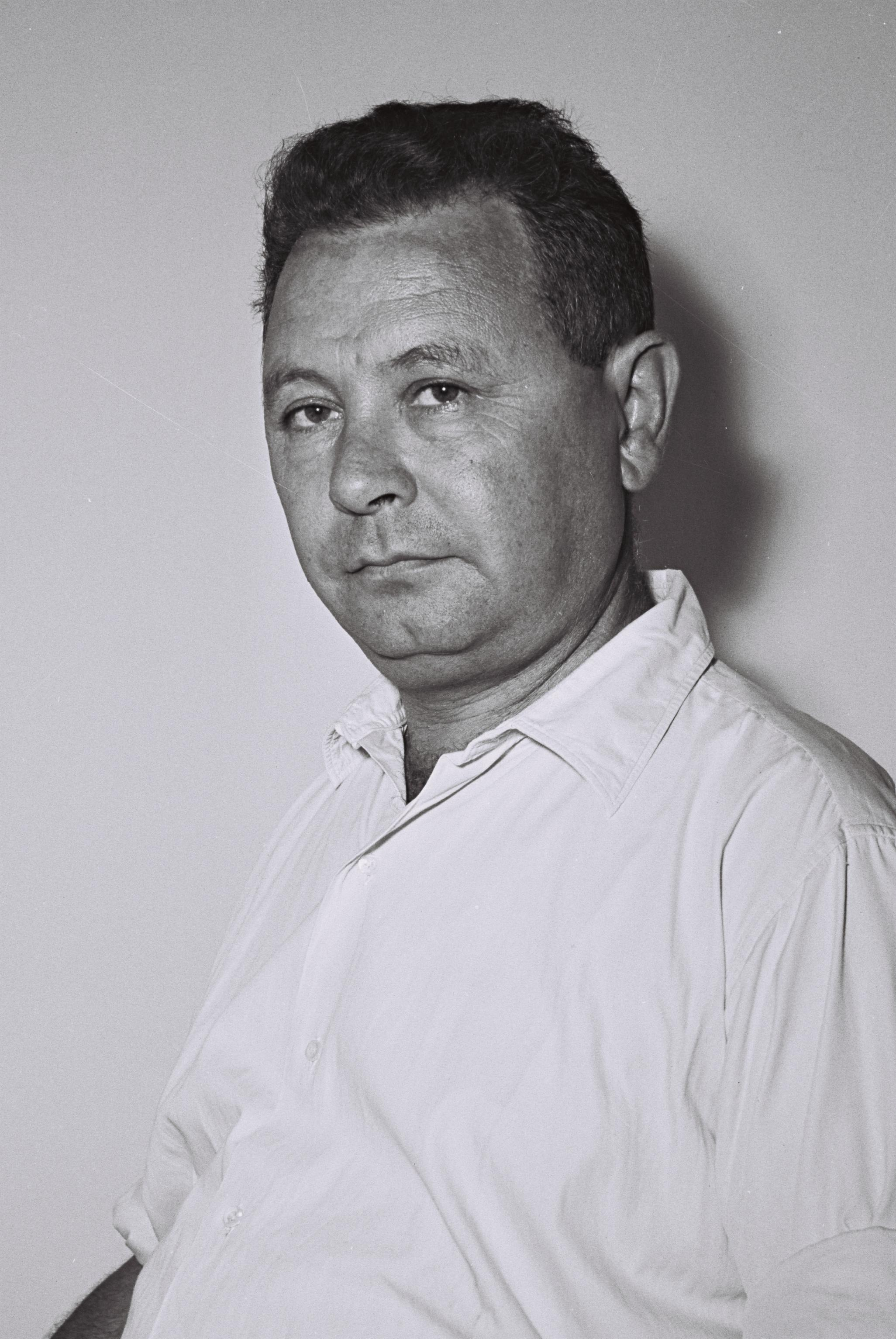

Ministerial roles
- 1965–1969: Minister of Transportation

Faction represented in the Knesset
- 1955–1965: Ahdut HaAvoda
- 1965–1968: Alignment
- 1968–1969: Labor Party
- 1969–1977: Alignment

Personal details
- Born: 17 January 1911 Mińsk Mazowiecki, Russian Empire
- Died: 14 August 2003 (aged 92)

Moshe Carmel (Hebrew: משה כרמל; 17 January 1911 – 14 August 2003) was an Israeli Major-General and politician who served as Minister of Transportation for eight years.

== Biography ==
Born in Mińsk Mazowiecki in the Russian Empire (today in Poland), Carmel emigrated to Mandate Palestine in 1924 when he was 13 years old. He was a founding member of kibbutz Na'an, and was active in the HaNoar HaOved VeHaLomed youth movement. Between 1939 and 1941 he was imprisoned by the British authorities. During the 1948 Palestine war, he was commander of the Carmeli Brigade, participating in the Battle of Haifa and Operation Hiram.

He was elected to the third Knesset in 1955 as a member of Ahdut HaAvoda and was appointed Minister of Transportation. On 28 September 1956 he flew to Paris with Moshe Dayan, Shimon Peres and Golda Meir where they had meetings with French Foreign Minister Christian Pineau. The purpose of the meetings was 'to clarify ... the possibilities of joint action against Egypt'.

On 29 October 1957 he suffered a broken arm after a Mills grenade was thrown into the debating chamber of the Knesset. David Ben-Gurion and Golda Meir were also injured. The attack was carried out by Moshe Dwek, whose motives were attributed to a dispute with the Jewish Agency, though he was also described as 'mentally unbalanced'. He retained his seat in the 1959 and 1961 elections, and was reappointed Minister of Transportation towards the end of the fifth Knesset in 1965. When Ahdut HaAvoda merged with Mapai to form the Alignment, Carmel joined the new party and retained his ministerial post in the sixth Knesset.

Carmel remained a Knesset member until 1977, and published two books; Northern Campaigns (1949) and Between the Walls (1965). He died in 2003 at the age of 92.
