= Operation Hiram =

Battle of the 1948 Arab–Israeli War

- Part of the 1948 Arab–Israeli War
- IDF soldiers in Sa'sa', 30 October 1948
Date	29 October 1948 – 31 October 1948
Location	Upper Galilee, Former Mandatory Palestine and Southern Lebanon
Result	Israeli victory
Territorial changes	Upper Galilee and part of Southern Lebanon incorporated into Israel

Belligerents
Israel; 7th Armoured Brigade; Carmeli Brigade; Golani Brigade; Oded Brigade; Circassian Unit; Druze Unit	Arab Liberation Army; Syria; Lebanon

Commanders and leaders
(Israel) Moshe Carmel	Fawzi al-Qawuqji

Strength
6,000	2,000–4,000

Casualties and losses
Light	400 killed 550 captured
- 50,000 Palestinian refugees

Operation Hiram was a military operation conducted by the Israel Defense Forces (IDF) during the 1948 Arab–Israeli War. It was led by General Moshe Carmel, and aimed at capturing the Upper Galilee region from the Arab Liberation Army (ALA) forces led by Fawzi al-Qawuqji and a Syrian battalion. The operation, which lasted 60 hours (29–31 October), ended just before the ceasefire with the neighboring Arab countries went into effect.

As a result of the operation, the Upper Galilee, originally slated by the United Nations partition plan to be part of an Arab state, would be controlled by the newly formed state of Israel, and more than 50,000 new Palestinian refugees were expelled from their homes.

== Overview ==
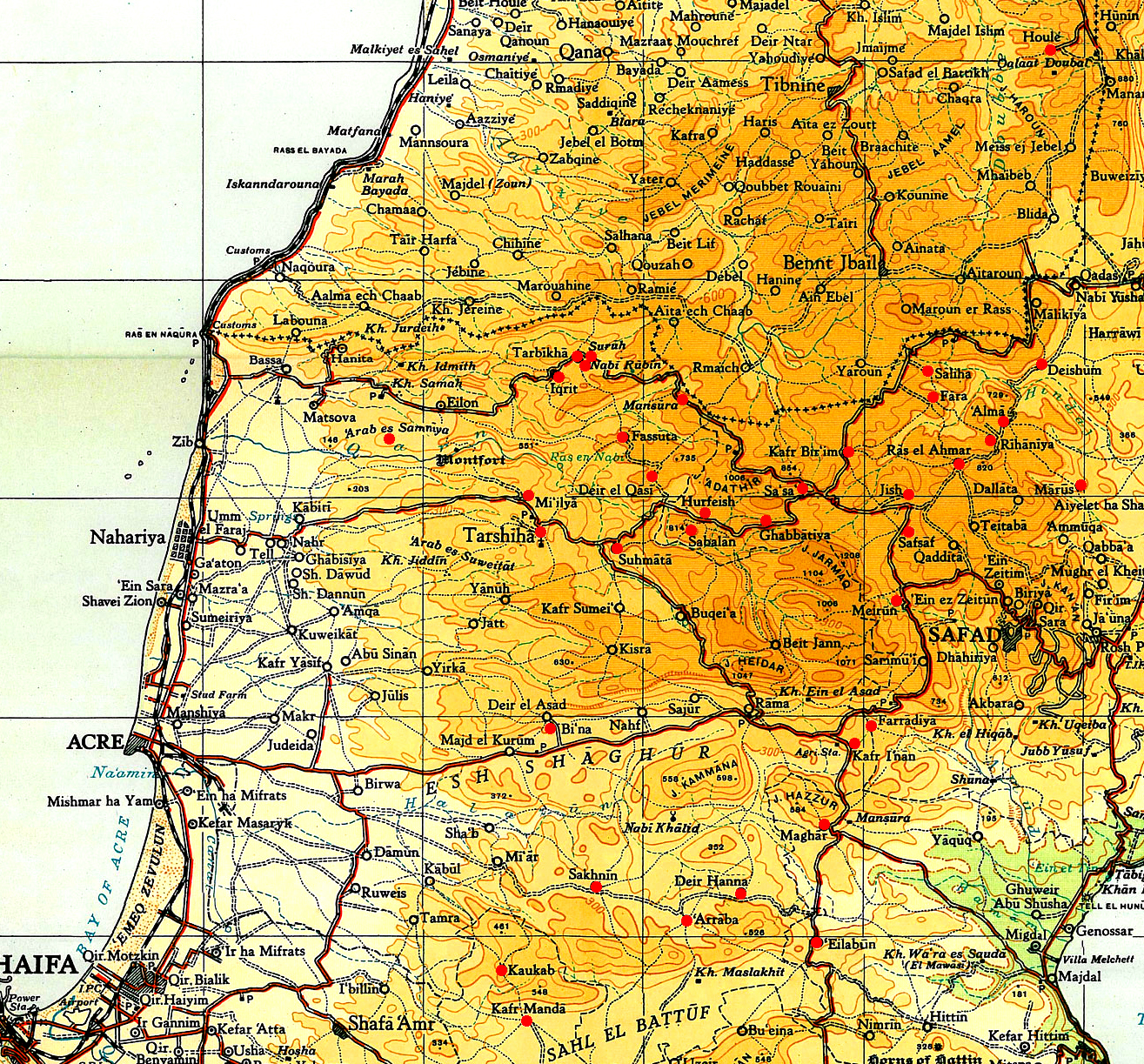
Villages captured during Operation Hiram. Grid = 10 km

On 18 July, the second truce of the conflict went into effect. On 26 September 1948, David Ben-Gurion told his cabinet that if fighting should be renewed in the north, then the Galilee would become "clean" [naki] and "empty" [reik] of Arabs, and implied that he had been assured of this by his generals.

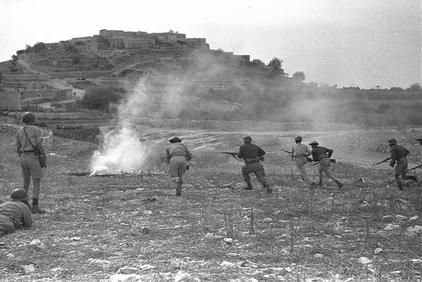
A Palmach unit attacks Sa'sa

Israeli machine gun position during an assault on Sa'sa

Before dawn on 22 October ALA violated the truce when it stormed the IDF hilltop position of Sheikh Abd, overlooking kibbutz Manara from the north. During 24–25 October, ALA troops regularly sniped at Manara and at traffic along the main road. Fawzi al-Qawuqji demanded that Israel evacuate neighboring kibbutz Yiftah and thin out its forces in Manara. Israel, in turn, demanded the ALA's withdrawal from the captured positions and, after a "no" from Qawuqji, informed the United Nations that it felt free to do as it pleased.

The operation was launched on the night of 28–29 October 1948, fielding four IDF brigades, the Seventh, Carmeli Brigade, Golani, and the Oded Brigade. The operational order was "to destroy the enemy in the central Galilee "pocket", to occupy the whole of the Galilee and to establish the defense line on the country´s northern border." On 29 October, Yosef Weitz, learning about the start of the operation, sent Yigael Yadin a note urging that the army should expel the "refugees" from the newly conquered areas.

The Ground offensive was preceded by bombing raids targeting Tarshiha, Jish and Sa'sa from 22 October, using Boeing B-17 Flying Fortresses and Douglas C-47 Skytrains (converted for bombing role). The heaviest night of bombing was 29/30 October when 13 missions dropped 21 tons of bombs on the seven villages. The bombardment of Tarshiha triggered the mass flight after 24 of the inhabitants were killed and approximately 60 were buried under rubble.

The initial thrust was carried out by the Seventh Brigade advancing from Safad. The Seventh Brigade occupied Qaddita on 29 October, Meirun and then Safsaf and Jish. In the 79th Battalion's report, the battles for Safsaf and Jish were described as "difficult" and "cruel" (achzari). One IDF report said "150–200" Arabs, "including a number of civilians" died in the battle for Jish. Other accounts report that 200 bodies were found around Jish and 80 at Meirum.

From Jish, the 72nd and 79th battalions then turned west to take Sa'sa. After taking Sa'sa the Israeli forces then turned northwest taking Kfar Birem, Saliha and by the afternoon of 30 October were at al Malikiya.

Simultaneously, the Golani Brigade engaged in diversionary tactics in the direction of the village of Illaboun. The Carmeli Brigade, which was assigned to counter attacks from Syria and Lebanon, crossed the border into Lebanon, captured 15 villages, and reached the Litani River. General Carmel had received direct permission from Prime Minister Ben-Gurion to enter Lebanon, but only as far as the river. In the final hours of the offensive Carmel's second-in-command, General Makleff, met Ben-Gurion in Tiberias and requested permission to advance and occupy Beirut which he claimed could be reached in twelve hours. Fearing international condemnation, Ben-Gurion refrained from taking action, as Lebanon was neutral in the conflict.

Ceasefire was scheduled to commence at 11:00 hours, 31 October 1948. The same day, at 7:30 in the morning, Major General Moshe Carmel ordered his brigades and district commanders "to continue the clearing operations inside the Galilee". In a cable dated 10:00 hours the same day Carmel ordered his brigades and district commanders: "Do all in your power for a quick and immediate clearing [tihur] of the conquered areas of all the hostile elements in line with the orders that have been issued[.] The inhabitants of the areas conquered should be assisted to leave." This order was apparently issued after Carmel had met with Ben-Gurion the same day.

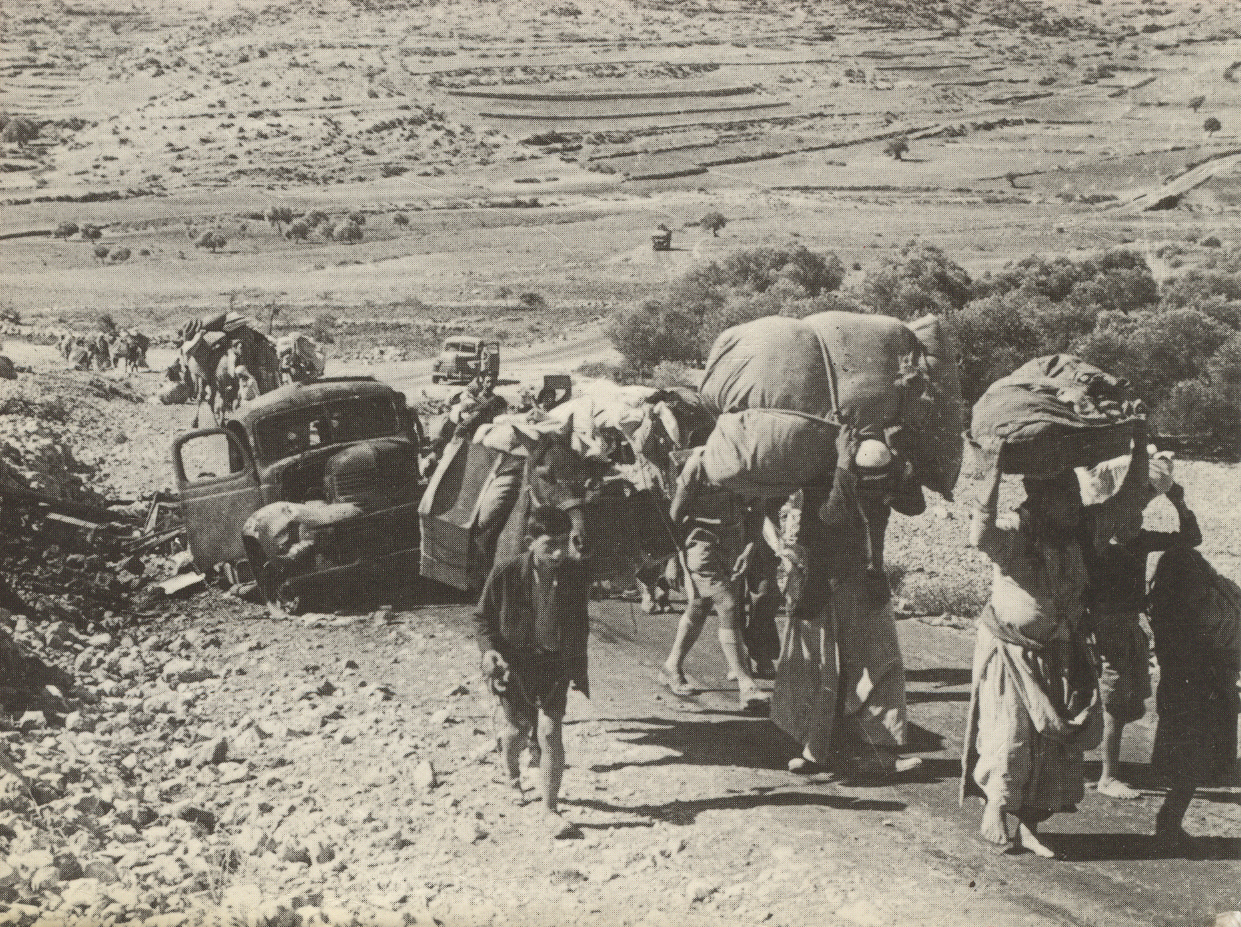
Villagers fleeing Galilee towards Lebanon, October/November 1948

On 31 October and 1 November 1948 the Hula massacre took place at the Lebanese village of Hula (Hule). The village had been captured on 24 October by the Carmeli Brigade without any resistance at all. Between 35 and 58 captured men were reportedly shot down in a house which was later blown up on top of them.

At the end of this lightning attack, Israeli forces reached the Hiram Junction, north of Safed. The siege of Manara was lifted, Qawuqji's army fled to Lebanon, and the roads crossing the Upper Galilee were secured. With the Galilee under Israeli control, the IDF established a defensive line along the Litani before withdrawing to the Lebanese border under the terms of the 1949 Armistice Agreements.

The Israeli Air Force bombings caused considerable damage to the villages in the area. Ilan Pappe gives the example of the four villages: Rama, Suhmata, Malkiyya and Kfar Bir'im. He states that out of the four 'the only village to remain intact was Rama. The other three were occupied and destroyed'. Very few villagers were allowed to stay in their homes and many were imprisoned or expelled to Lebanon and elsewhere. Ilan Pappe claims that the 'Hebrew noun tihur (cleansing) assumed new meanings' during this time period. He argues that although 'it still described, as before, the total expulsion and destruction of a village, it could now also represent other activities, such as selective search and expulsion operations'.

One Israeli estimate gives a total of 400 Arabs killed during the offensive and 550 taken prisoner.

The name is a reference to Hiram I, the Biblical king of Tyre. He was instrumental in the construction of the First Temple of Jerusalem.

== Massacres ==
According to Israeli historian Benny Morris, the atrocities committed during Operation Hiram clearly embarrassed the IDF and Israeli officials who were soon forced to respond to Arab and United Nations charges in various forums. The main official Israeli response was a flat or qualified denial that atrocities had taken place.

== Arab communities captured in Operation Hiram ==
Name	Population 1945 census	Dates	Resistance	Brigade	Notes
Al-Nabi Rubin	1000	Early October	none	n/a	Hamlet depopulated and destroyed
Mirun	290	29 October	militia 'company'	7th Brigade; Carmeli Brigade	Village depopulated and destroyed. 80 defenders killed.
Safsaf	910	29 October	ALA 2nd Battalion	7th Brigade	see Safsaf massacre. Village depopulated and destroyed.
Jish	1,090	29 October	Syrian battalion	7th Brigade	10 POWs + "a number of" civilians executed. Inhabitants, majority Muslim, expelled. The town later re-populated with Christian refugees from neighbouring villages. 200 defenders killed.
Tarshiha	3,840	29 October	Villagers and members of ALA	Oded Brigade	By December around 700 villagers had returned to their homes, over 100 of whom were deported January 1949. Buildings re-populated with Jewish immigrants.
Sa'sa	1,130	30 October	none	7th Brigade; Druze unit	Alleged killings of civilians. However, the relevant files remain closed to historians. Town depopulated and destroyed.
Suhmata	1,130	30 October	none	Golani Brigade	Village depopulated and destroyed.
Dayr al-Qassi	2,300 including Fassuta and al-Mansura	30 October	none	n/a	Town depopulated and destroyed.
Dayshum	590	30 October	some villagers	7th Brigade	Village depopulated and destroyed.
Eilabun	550	30 October	ALA force	Golani	see Eilabun massacre. Town's population expelled but negotiated permission to return during summer 1949.
Fara	320	30 October	N/A	7th Brigade	Village depopulated and destroyed.
al-Farradiyya	670	30 October	N/A	Golani Brigade	Village depopulated and destroyed.
Fassuta	2,300 including Dayr al-Qasi and al-Mansura	30 October			Population allowed to remain in their homes,
Ghabbatiyya	60	30 October	Arab Liberation Army	N/A	Hamlet depopulated and destroyed.
Kafr 'Inan	360	30 October	none	Golani Brigade	Village depopulated and destroyed
Marus	80	30 October	none	7th Brigade	Village depopulated and destroyed.
al Ras al Ahmar	620	30 October	'empty'	7th Brigade	Village depopulated and destroyed.
Sabalan, Safad	70	30 October	N/A	Golani Brigade, 1st Battalion	Hamlet depopulated and destroyed.
Saliha	1,070	30 October	none	7th Brigade	Documented 60–94 killed. Village depopulated and destroyed.
Kafr Bir'im	710	31 October	'surrendered'	N/A	Village depopulated and destroyed.
Arab al-Samniyya	200	30–31 October	none	7th, Carmeli, Golani, Oded	Village depopulated and destroyed.
Iqrit	490	31 October	none	Oded Brigade	Village depopulated and destroyed.
Iribbin, Khirbat	360	31 October	none	Oded Brigade	Village depopulated and destroyed.
Hula		31 October			Village in Lebanon. See Hula massacre
Mi'ilya	900	31 October			On 1 November the local IDF commander allowed the villagers to return to their homes. In March 1949 25 persons deported for passing information to the enemy.
Al-Mansura, Acre	2,300 including Fassuta and Dayr al-Qasi	29–31 October	n/a	n/a	Town depopulated and destroyed.
Hurfeish	Druze	29–31 October			Town's population allowed to remain in their homes.
Tarbikha	1,000	29–31 October	none	Oded Brigade	Town depopulated and destroyed.
Suruh	1,000	29–31 October	none	n/a	Village depopulated and destroyed.
Al Bi'na	830	29–31 October		n/a	Some villagers remained after the war. Town exists today.
Kaukab	490	29–31 October		n/a	Villagers surrender and remained after the war. Town exists today.
Kafr Manda	1,260	29–31 October		n/a	Some villagers remained after the war. Town exists today.
Sakhnin	1,891 (1931 census)	29–31 October		n/a	Some villagers remained after the war. Town exists today.
Arraba	1,800	29–31 October		n/a	Some villagers remained after the war. Town exists today.
Deir Hanna	750	29–31 October		n/a	Some villagers remained after the war. Town exists today.
Maghar	2,140	29–31 October		n/a	Some inhabitants remained after the war. Town exists today.
Rihaniya	n/a Circassian	29–31 October		n/a	Some villagers remained after the war. Town exists today.
Alma	950	29–31 October		n/a	Villagers expelled and buildings demolished.

== Brigades participating in Operation Hiram ==
- Carmeli Brigade
- Golani Brigade
- Sheva' Brigade
- Oded Brigade

== See also ==
- Correcting a Mistake: Jews and Arabs in Palestine/Israel, 1936-1956
- Depopulated Palestinian locations in Israel

== Bibliography ==
- Walid Khalidi (editor), All that remains: the Palestinian villages occupied and depopulated by Israel in 1948. (1992). Institute of Palestine Studies. ISBN 0-88728-224-5.
- Benvenisti, Meron (2000). Sacred Landscape: The Buried History of the Holy Land Since 1948. University of California Press. ISBN 0-520-21154-5,
- Morris, Benny (2004). The Birth of the Palestinian Refugee Problem Revisited Cambridge: Cambridge University Press. ISBN 0-521-00967-7
- Nazzal, Nafez (1978): The Palestinian Exodus from Galilee 1948, The Institute for Palestine Studies, (Safsaf, p. 93–96, 107)
- Ilan Pappé (2006) The Ethnic Cleansing of Palestine Oneworld publications ISBN 978-1-85168-467-0
