= Malkia =

Kibbutz in northern Israel

Malkia: מלכיה (Hebrew)
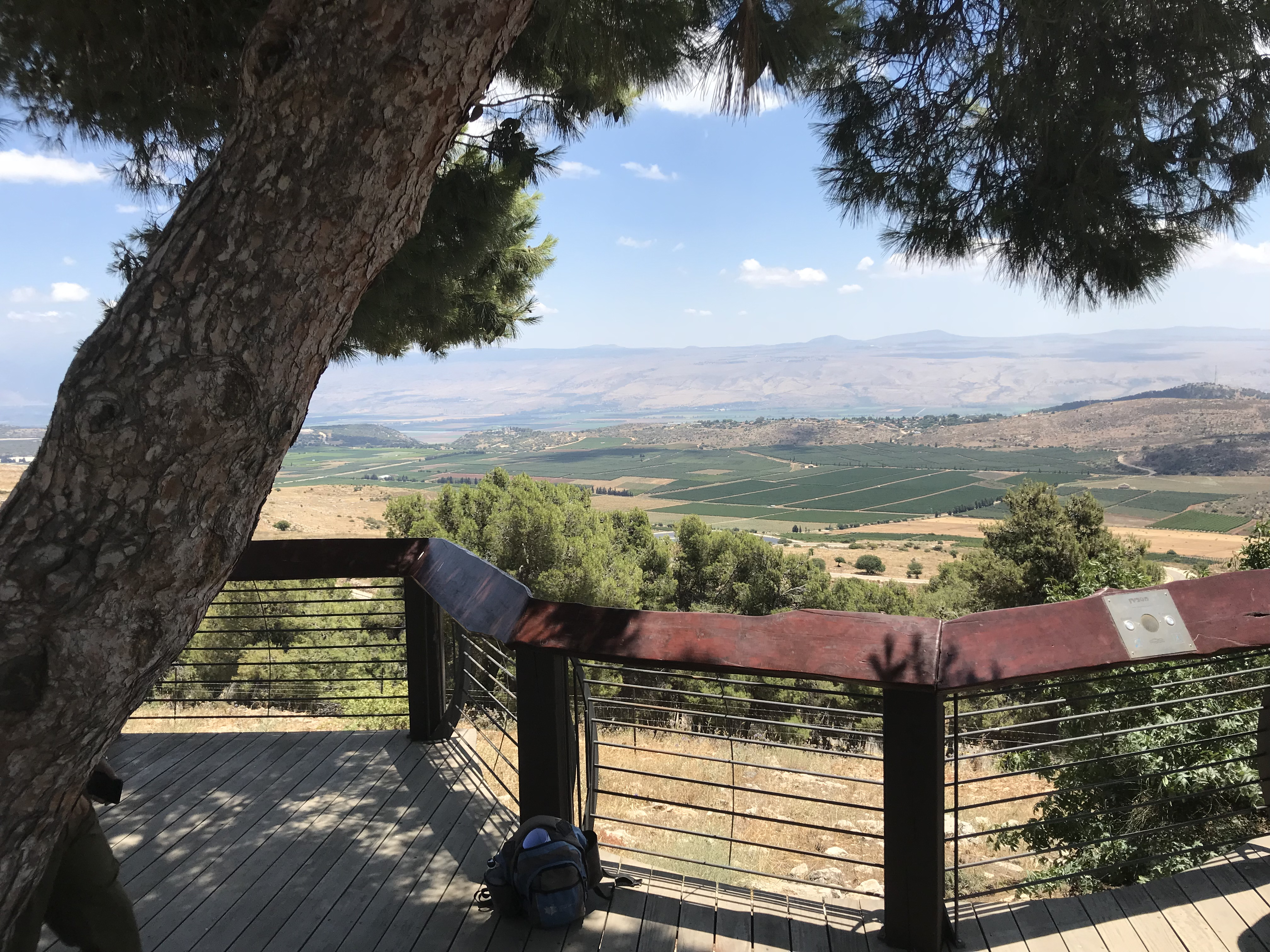

- Location within Northeast Israel Location within Israel
- Coordinates: 33°5′54″N 35°30′40″E
- Country: Israel
- District: Northern
- Subdistrict: Safed
- Council: Upper Galilee
- Affiliation: Kibbutz Movement
- Founded: March 1949
- Founder: Demobilised Palmach soldiers
- Population (2024): 500
- Website: www.malkiya.co.il

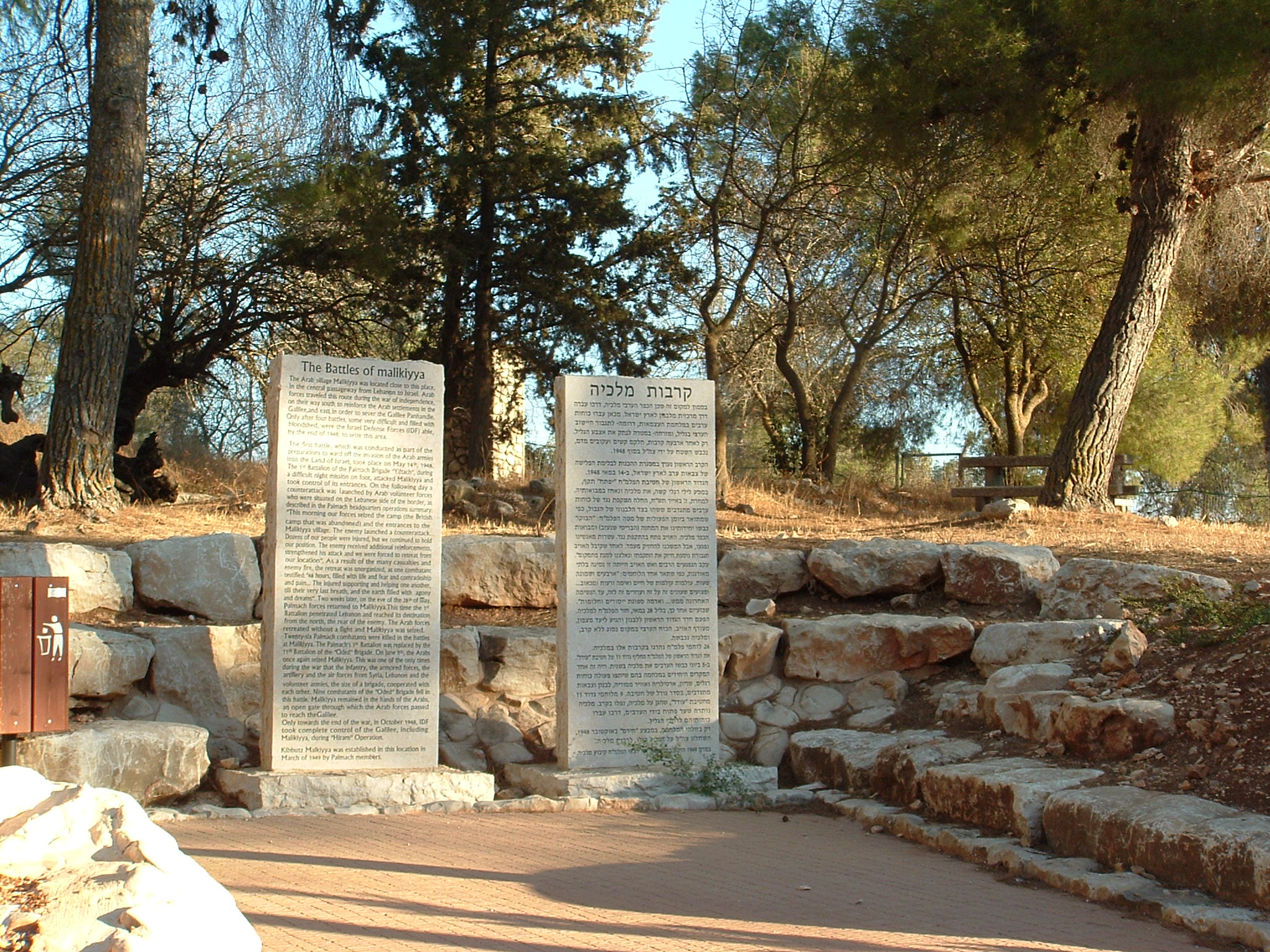
Independence War Memorial in Malkia

Malkia (Hebrew: מלכיה) is a kibbutz in northern Israel. Located near the Lebanese border and Kiryat Shmona, it falls under the jurisdiction of Upper Galilee Regional Council. In 2024 it had a population of 500.

== History ==
The village was established in March 1949 by six former Palmach soldiers who had been demobilised at the end of the 1948 Arab-Israeli War. Located near the depopulated Jabal Amil villages of Qadas and al-Malkiyya, it was named after al-Malkiyya, a holdover name from the biblical village of Malkia, itself the name of a priestly family from biblical times (Nehemiah 10:4) that settled here, on whose lands it was established.

During the 2023 war between Hamas and Israel, northern Israeli border communities, including Malkia, faced targeted attacks by Hezbollah and Palestinian factions based in Lebanon, and were evacuated.

On May 13, 2024,anti-tank missiles fired from Lebanon struck neer Kibbutz Malkia ,wounding four Israel Defense Forces soldiers in the area.

== Notable residents ==
- Micha Bar-Am (born 1930), photographer and photojournalist

== Gallery ==
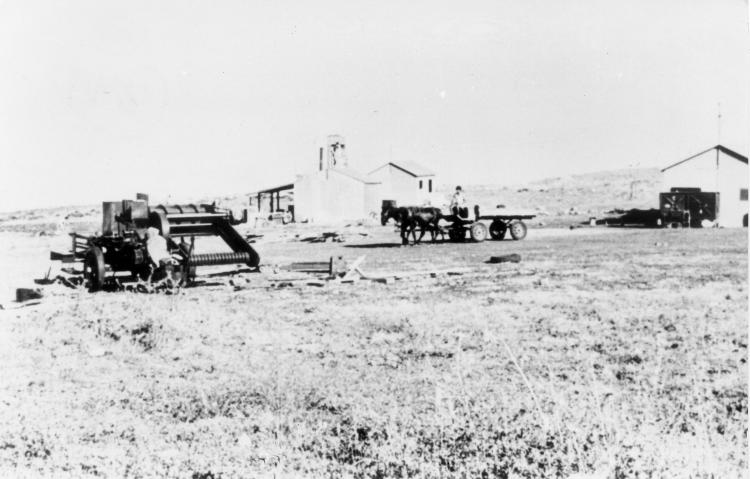
Malkia shortly after its establishment

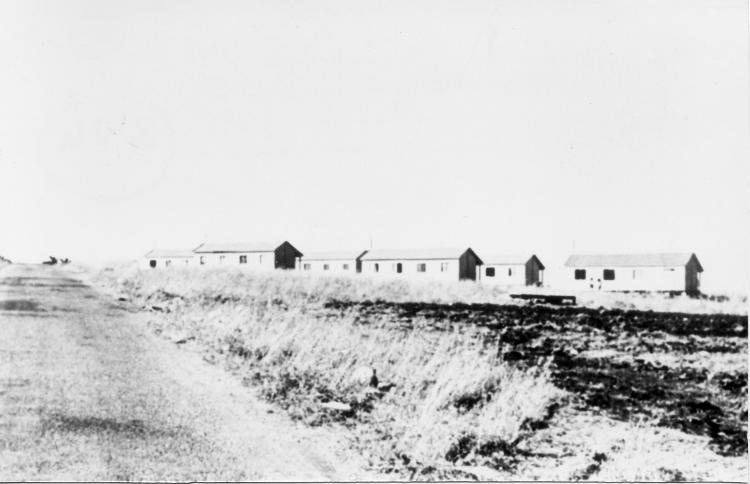
Early view of Malkia

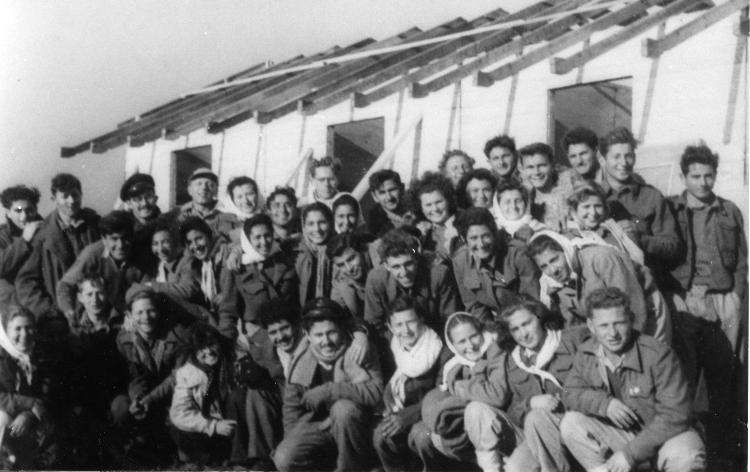
Building of first cabin at Malkia

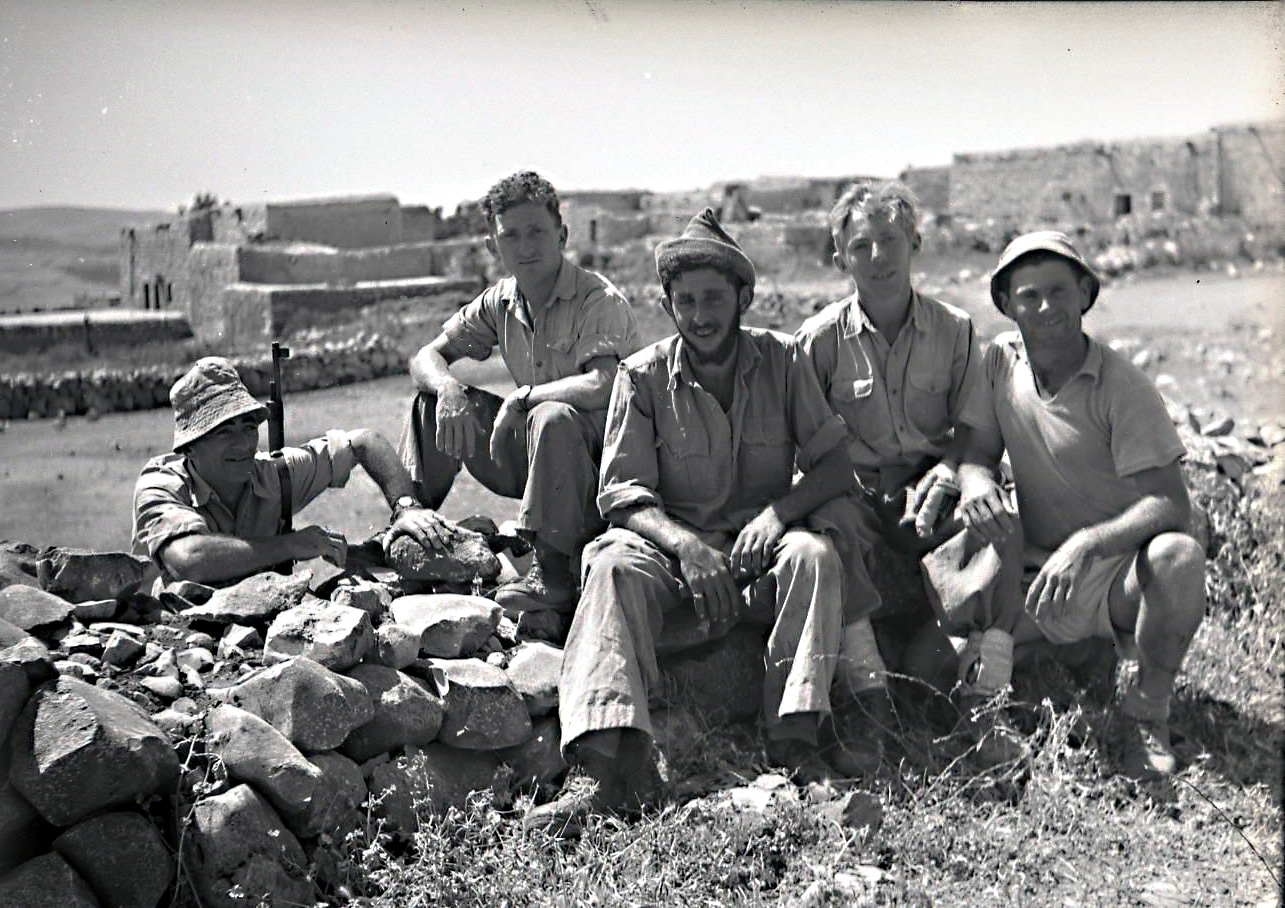
Malkia members 1948

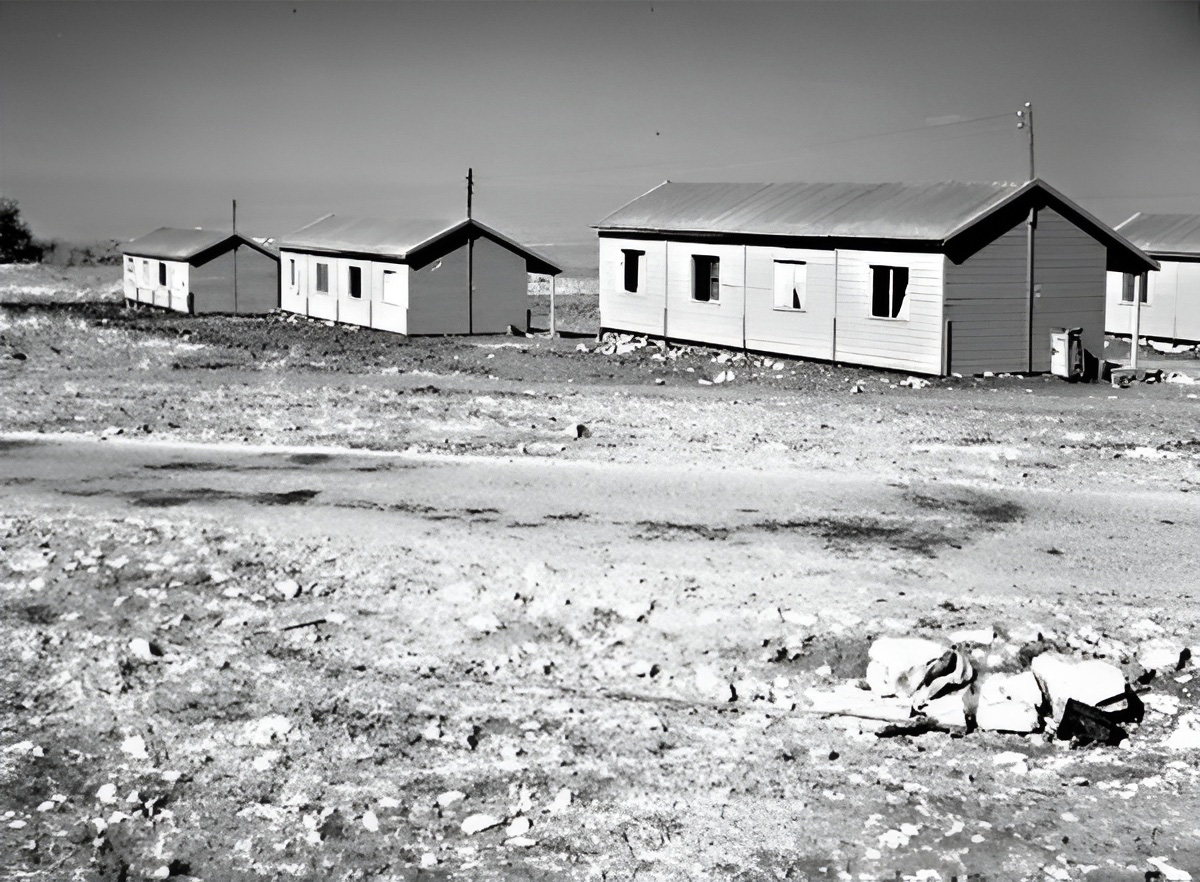
Malkia 1949

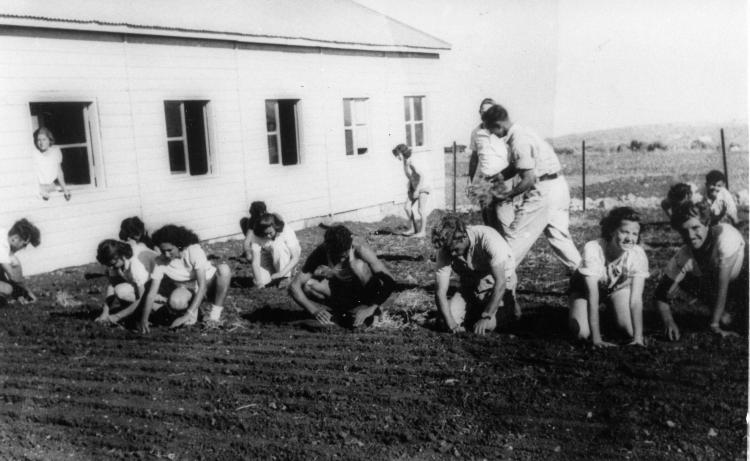
Members of the Harel Brigade planting grass seeds in 1950

== See also ==
- Kedesh
