= Al-Malkiyya =

Al-Malikiyya المالكية Malikiya, al
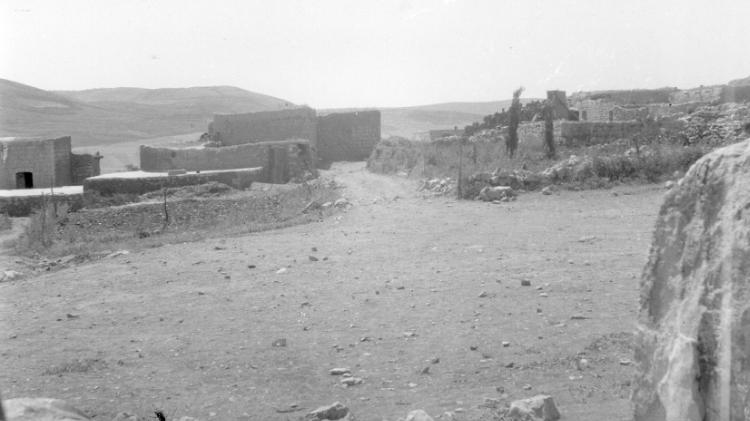
- al-Malikiyya May 1948
- Etymology: from "Malek": to possess, or reign
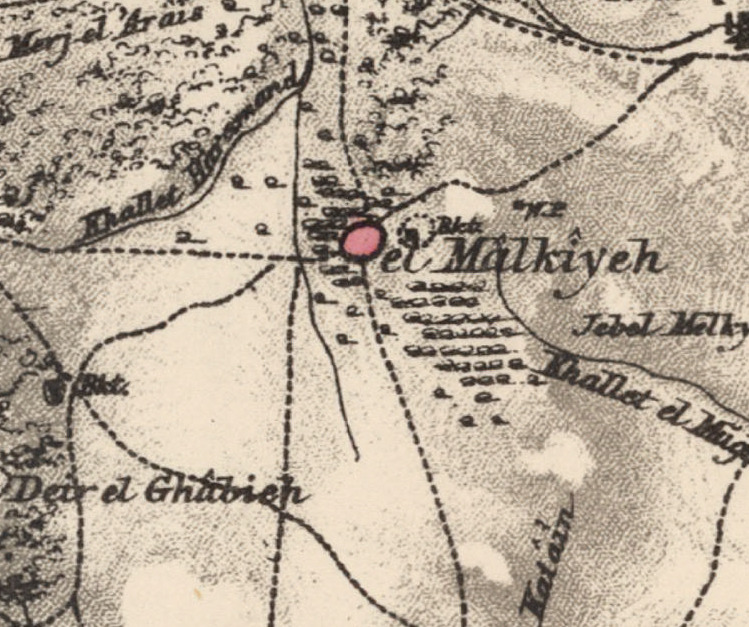
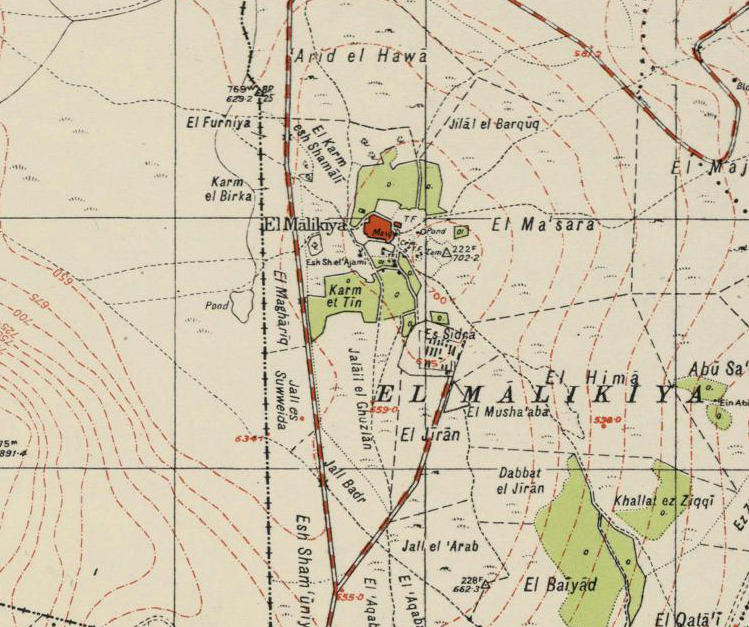
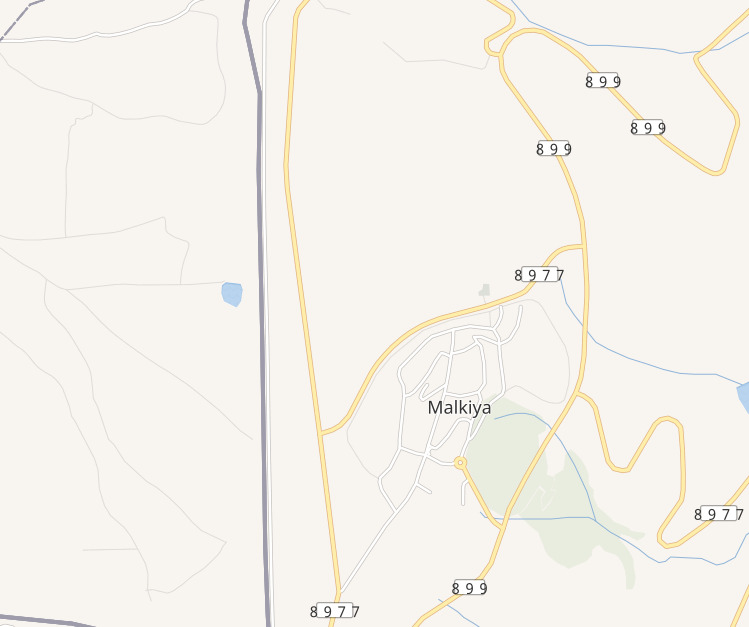
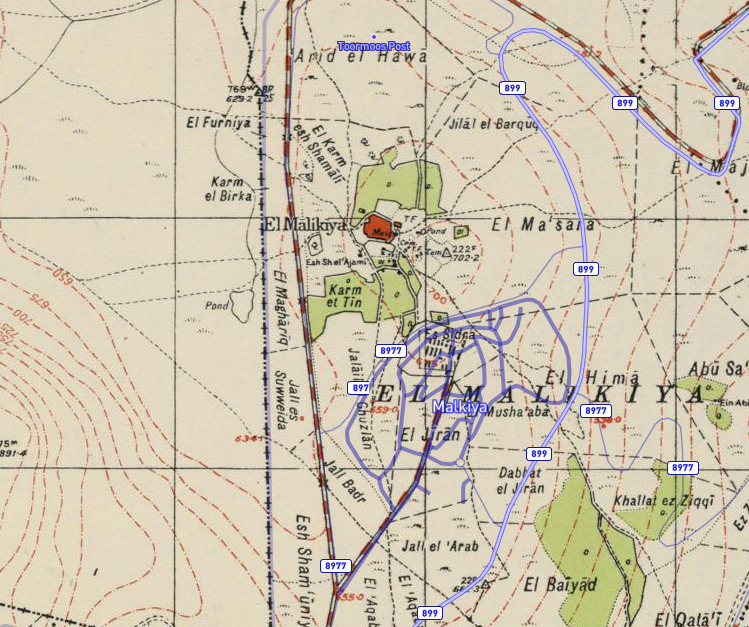
- 1870s map 1940s map modern map 1940s with modern overlay map A series of historical maps of the area around Al-Malkiyya (click the buttons)

- Location within Mandatory Palestine
- Coordinates: 33°06′19″N 35°30′29″E
- Palestine grid: 197/278
- Geopolitical entity: Mandatory Palestine
- Subdistrict: Safad
- Date of depopulation: 28 May 1948

Area
  - Total: 7,328 dunams (7.328 km^{2}; 2.829 sq mi)

Population (1945)
  - Total: 360
- Cause(s) of depopulation: Military assault by Yishuv forces
- Current Localities: Malkiya

Al-Malkiyya (Arabic: المالكية), also known as Al-Malikiyah, was a Palestinian village located in the Jabal Amil region. In a 1920s census, the village was registered as part of Greater Lebanon. It was later placed under the British Mandate of Palestine. Its population was mostly Metawali Shiite.

In a 1930s census, the village was registered as Palestinian and part of the Safed District. The village was depopulated as a result of the 1948 Arab–Israeli War.

== History ==
According to the Arab geographer Yaqut al-Hamawi (died 1228), the people of al-Malikiyya had a wooden platter that they believed was originally owned by the prophet Mohammed.

=== Ottoman era ===
In 1596, al-Malikiyya was a village in the Ottoman nahiya (subdistrict) of Tibnin under the liwa' (district) of Safad, with a population of 369. It paid taxes on a number of crops, such as wheat, barley, as well as goats and beehives.

Victor Guérin visited in 1875, and noted that Al-Malkiyya had 300 Metawali inhabitants. He further noted that the village, which stood upon a lofty summit, was remarkable for possessing neither well nor cistern; the women fetched their water from the spring at Kades. But a birkeh was placed on the map close to the village.

In 1881, the PEF's Survey of Western Palestine (SWP) described Al-Malkiyya as being built of stone and adobe, lying on a plain to the east of a valley. Well supplied with water from a nearby wadi, the village's 200-300 inhabitants cultivated olives.

=== British Mandate era ===
In the 1931 census of Palestine, conducted by the British Mandate authorities, El Malikiya had a population of 254, all Muslims, in 48 houses.

The population was 360 Muslims in the 1945 statistics, with a total of 7,328 dunams of land. A total of 4,225 dunums were allocated to cereals, while 55 dunams were classifies as built-up land.

=== 1948 Arab-Israeli war, aftermath ===
Al-Malikiyya changed hands no fewer than five times between May and October 1948.

A battle was fought in the village on 5–6 June 1948. Combatants were Israelis and the Lebanese army commanded by Said Nasrallah, who would go on to become chief of staff of the Lebanese Armed Forces, along with Colonel El Sheikh Fawaz Kais. The Lebanese army would occupy the village for a month until clashes erupted again with the Israeli army attacking. However, the Lebanese Army were able to hold their positions, until the Lebanese Army was ordered to retreat due to threats from foreign countries. However, Colonel Kais did not adhere to orders and ordered his platoon to hold the position as he believed the situation was under control and his troops were able to defend the town. Other platoons stationed in the town retreated after receiving the order, leaving solely Colonel Kais' platoon to fight against the Israeli Army. After heavy clashes, and the Lebanese Army losing positions quickly due to the retreat of the rest of the platoons, Colonel Kais' ordered the retreat of his platoon to avoid casualties. This was the only time Lebanon directly participated in the war.

As a result of the war, the village was depopulated.

In 1949, a kibbutz, Malkiya, was set up on village lands.

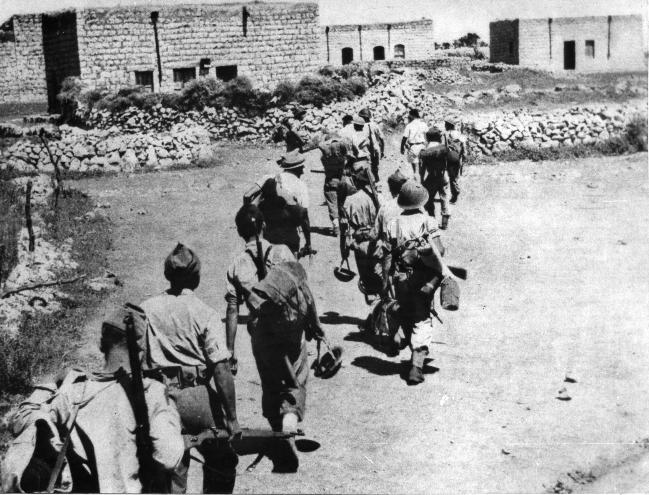
Members of the Yiftach Brigade entering al-Malikiyya, May 1948

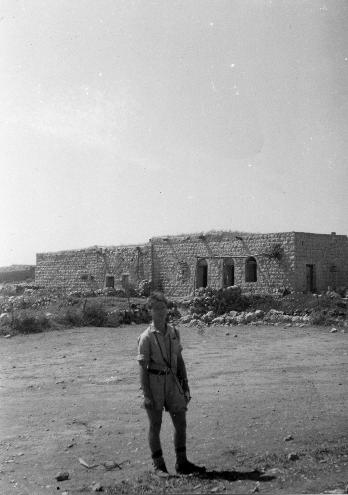
Al Malikiyya, 1948. Medic from Yiftach Brigade in foreground.

== See also ==
- Depopulated Palestinian locations in Israel
- Metawali
- Operation Hiram
- Shia villages in Palestine

== Bibliography ==
- Conder, C.R.; Kitchener, H.H. (1881). The Survey of Western Palestine: Memoirs of the Topography, Orography, Hydrography, and Archaeology. Vol. 1. London: Committee of the Palestine Exploration Fund.
- Department of Statistics (1945). Village Statistics, April, 1945. Government of Palestine.
- Guérin, V. (1880). Description Géographique Historique et Archéologique de la Palestine (in French). Vol. 3: Galilee, pt. 2. Paris: L'Imprimerie Nationale.
- Hadawi, S. (1970). Village Statistics of 1945: A Classification of Land and Area ownership in Palestine. Palestine Liberation Organization Research Center. Archived from the original on 2018-12-08.
- Hütteroth, W.-D.; Abdulfattah, K. (1977). Historical Geography of Palestine, Transjordan and Southern Syria in the Late 16th Century. Erlanger Geographische Arbeiten, Sonderband 5. Erlangen, Germany: Vorstand der Fränkischen Geographischen Gesellschaft. ISBN 3-920405-41-2.
- Khalidi, W. (1992). All That Remains:The Palestinian Villages Occupied and Depopulated by Israel in 1948. Washington D.C.: Institute for Palestine Studies. ISBN 0-88728-224-5.
- Mills, E., ed. (1932). Census of Palestine 1931. Population of Villages, Towns and Administrative Areas. Jerusalem: Government of Palestine.
- Morris, B. (2004). The Birth of the Palestinian Refugee Problem Revisited. Cambridge University Press. ISBN 978-0-521-00967-6.
- Palmer, E.H. (1881). The Survey of Western Palestine: Arabic and English Name Lists Collected During the Survey by Lieutenants Conder and Kitchener, R. E. Transliterated and Explained by E.H. Palmer. Committee of the Palestine Exploration Fund.
- Rhode, H. (1979). Administration and Population of the Sancak of Safed in the Sixteenth Century. Columbia University. Archived from the original on 2020-03-01.
- Stepansky, Yosef (2004-06-02). "Malkiyya (East) Final Report" (116). Hadashot Arkheologiyot – Excavations and Surveys in Israel.
- Strange, le, G. (1890). Palestine Under the Moslems: A Description of Syria and the Holy Land from A.D. 650 to 1500. Committee of the Palestine Exploration Fund.
