= Highway 89 (Israel) =

Highway in Israel

Coordinates: 33°01′22″N 35°19′31″E

Highway 89
- כביש 89
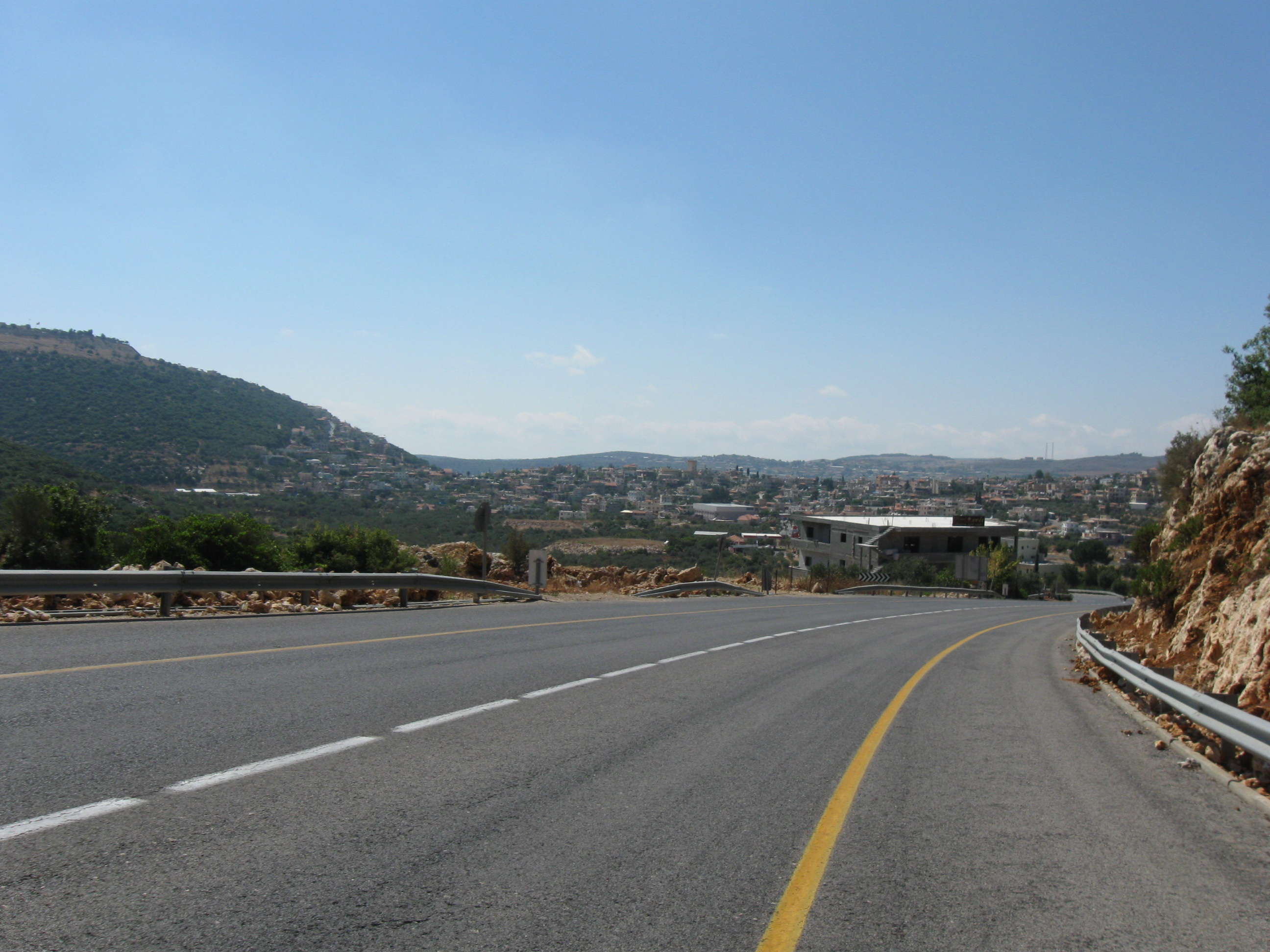
- Highway 89 at the eastern entrance to Hurfeish

Route information
- Length: 58 km (36 mi)

Major junctions
- West end: Nahariya Junction
- East end: Elifelet Interchange

Location
- Country: Israel

Highway system
- Roads in Israel; Highways
← Highway 87	→ Highway 90

Highway 89 is a major east–west highway in the Upper Galilee and Western Galilee in northern Israel. It begins in the west in Nahariya and continues east to Ma'alot-Tarshiha, Safed, Hatzor HaGlilit and Rosh Pina, crossing the entire Galilee. It is 58 km long

The route begins in the west at Nahariya junction with Highway 4 and continues east past several moshavim, kibbutzim and villages until it reaches Ma'alot-Tarshiha. Afterward, the road continues to Meron mountain, where it turns south toward Safed and passes south of the city. It continues east toward its eastern terminus, a junction with Highway 90 at Elifelet

== Junctions & Interchanges ==
Km	Name	Type	Location	Intersecting routes
	Nahariya Junction		Nahariya	Highway 4
	—		Nahariya	HaGilead St.
	—		Nahariya	HaNegev and HaGolan Streets
	—		Nahariya	Yehiam Rd.
	—		Nahariya	HaZeitim Rd.
	(Entrance to Ben Ami)		Ben Ami, Nahariya Western Galilee Hospital	21st Battalion St.
	Kabri Junction		Kabri	Highway 70
	—		HaShayara Spring, Mateh Asher regional school	Local road
	Ga'aton Junction			Road 8833
	—		Armor Hill	Local road
	(Entrance to Neve Ziv)		Neve Ziv	Local road
	—		Mi'ilya	Local road
	—		Mi'ilya	Local road
	—		Me'ona	Road 8835
	—		Ma'alot-Tarshiha	Chaim Herzog Blvd.
	—		Ma'alot-Tarshiha	Road 8835
	—		Ma'alot-Tarshiha	43 Immigrants Blvd.
	Yefe Nof Interchange		Ma'alot-Tarshiha	43 Immigrants Blvd.
	Tefen Junction		Ma'alot-Tarshiha	Road 854
	Hosen Junction		Hosen	Road 864
	(Entrance to Tzuriel)		Tzuriel	Local road
	Elkosh Junction		Elkosh	Road 8944
	—		Hurfeish	Local road
	Sultan Basha al-Atrash Square		Hurfeish	Local road
	—		Hurfeish	Local road
	—		Hurfeish	Local road
	—		Hurfeish	Local road
	—		Hurfeish	Local road
	—		East of Hurfeish	Local road
	—		Near Mount Meron	Local road
	(Entrance to Sasa)		Sasa	Local road
	—		Sasa	Road 899
	Hiram Junction			Road 899
	(Entrance to Tziv'on)		Tziv'on	Local road
	—		Jish	Local road
	—		Jish	Local road
	—		Jish	Local road
	(Entrance to Kfar Hoshen)		Kfar Hoshen	Local road
	(Entrance to Bar Yohai and Or HaGanuz)		Bar Yohai	Local road
	Meron Junction		Meron	Road 866
	Ein Zeitim Junction		South of Ein Zeitim	Road 886
	—		Safed	Local road
	(Entrance to Akbara)		Safed (Akbara neighborhood)	Local road
	Elifelet Interchange		Elifelet	Highway 90

== See also ==
- List of highways in Israel
- Driving on the highway from west to east (video)
