= Route 864 (Israel) =

Route in Israel

Route 864
- כביש 864
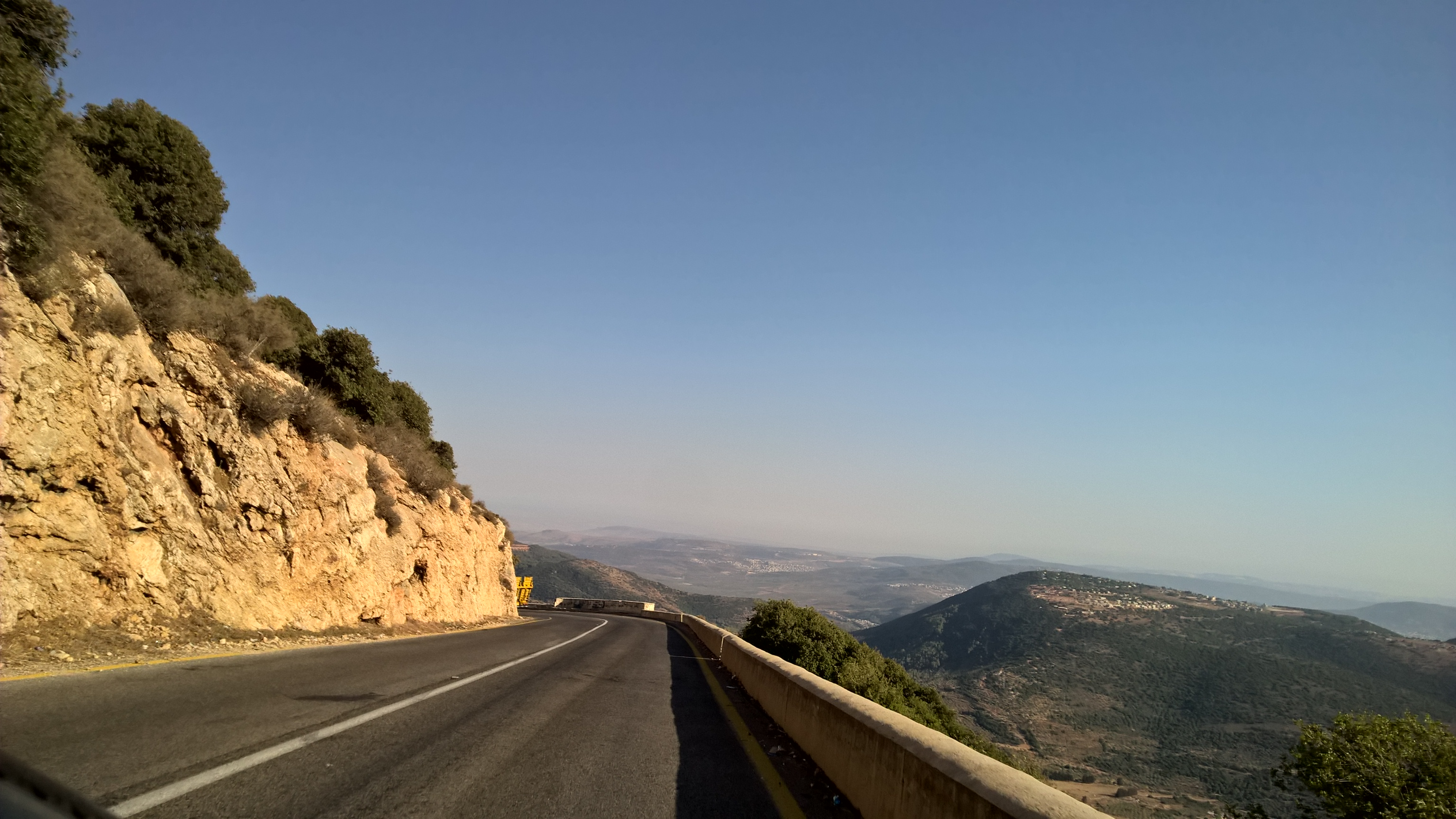

Route information
- Length: 13.8 km (8.6 mi)

Major junctions
- South end: Rameh Junction
- North end: Hosen Junction

Location
- Country: Israel

Highway system
- Roads in Israel; Highways
← Route 859	→ Route 866

Route 864 is a north-south regional highway in the Galilee in northern Israel. It begins in the south at Rameh junction with Highway 85 and ends in the north at Hosen junction with Highway 89.

== Junctions (South to North) ==
District	Location	km	mi	Name	Destinations	Notes
Northern	Rameh	0	0.0	צומת ראמה (Rameh Junction)	Highway 85	
Northern	Beitegen	5	3.1	צומת בית ג'ן (Beitegen Junction)	Road 8643	
Northern	Harashim	5.5	3.4	צומת חרשים (Harashim Junction)	Road 8641	
Northern	Peki'in	9.7	6.0	כיכר פקיעין (Peki'in Square)	Entrance to Peki'in	
Northern	Peki'in HaHadasha	11	6.8	צומת פקיעין (Peki'in Junction)	Road 8655	
Northern	Hosen	13	8.1	מסעף חוסן (Hosen Branch)	Entrance to Hosen	
Northern	Hosen	13.8	8.6	צומת חוסן (Hosen Junction)	Highway 89	
1.000 mi = 1.609 km; 1.000 km = 0.621 mi

== See also ==
- List of highways in Israel
