= Mixed cities =

Eight multi-ethnic metropoles in Israel

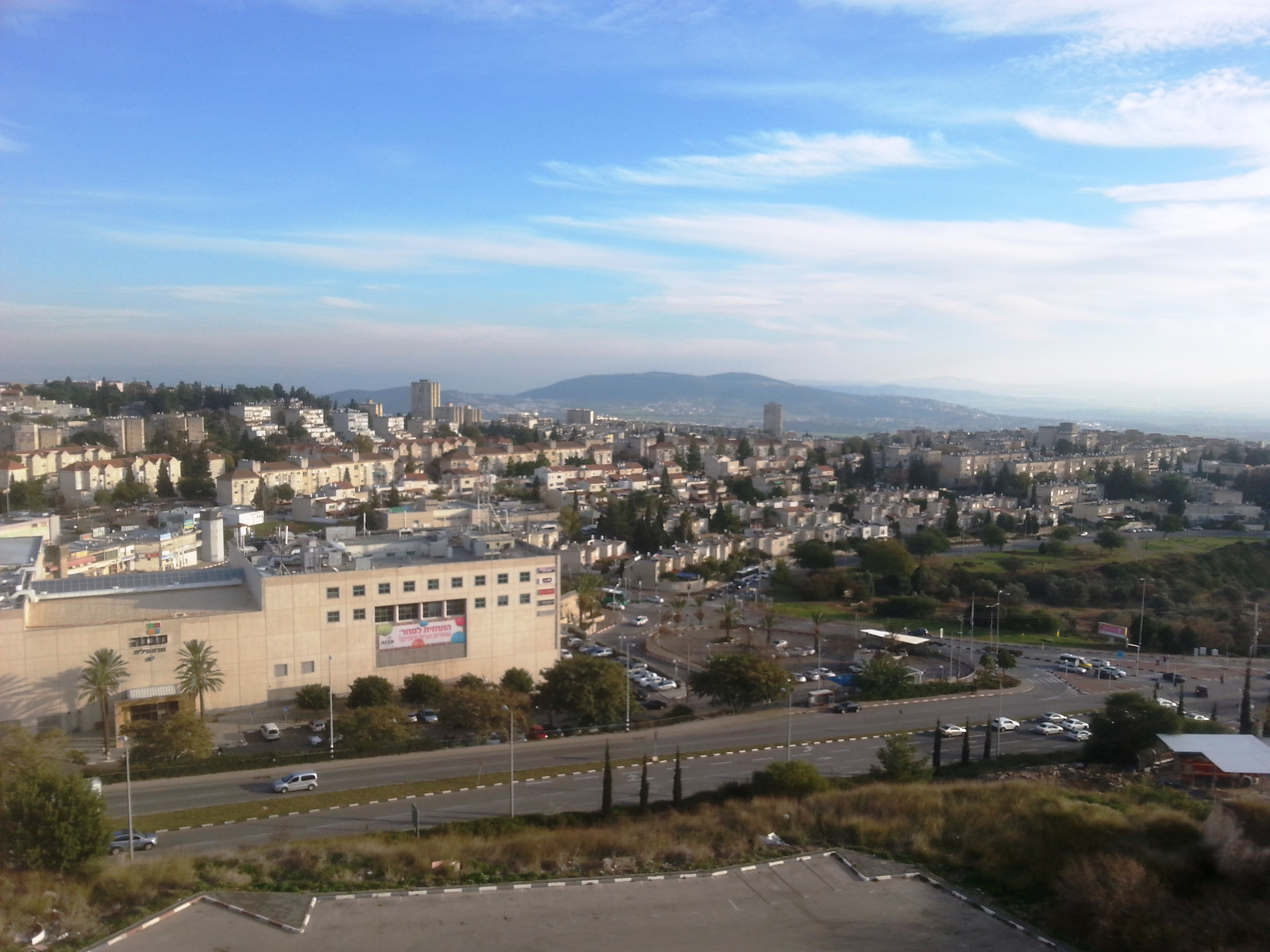
Nof HaGalil, a mixed city adjacent to the Arab-Israeli city of Nazareth

In Israel, the mixed cities (Hebrew: ערים מעורבות, romanized: 'arim me'oravot, Arabic: المدن المختلطة, romanized: al-mudun al-mukhtalita) or mixed towns are the eight cities with a significant number of both Jews and Arabs. The eight mixed Jewish-Arab cities, defined by the Israel Central Bureau of Statistics as those with more than 10% of the population registered as "Arabs" and more than 10% of the population registered as "Jews", include the following seven Israeli cities: Haifa, Lod, Ramle, Jaffa (now a part of Tel Aviv), Acre, Nof HaGalil (formerly Nazareth Illit), and Ma'alot Tarshiha. Approximately 10% of the Arab citizens of Israel live in these seven cities. The eighth city is Jerusalem, in which the Arab part of the city, East Jerusalem, has been annexed by Israel but is not recognized as such under international law.

The term "mixed cities" should not be confused with multicultural cities, nor understood to necessarily imply social integration. The eight mixed cities are the main places in which Jews and Arabs encounter each other, and very limited population mixing exists in Israel outside of these eight cities. As a result the topic has attracted significant scholarly focus over many years, and since the Second Intifada (2000–2005) it became the crux of social science scholarship in Israel.

== History ==
Cities in the 1922 census of Palestine, at the start of Mandatory Palestine. Most cities were 96–100% Palestinian Arab; only five cities were significantly "mixed": Jerusalem, Jaffa, Haifa, Safad and Tiberias.

Mixed cities shown in 1944

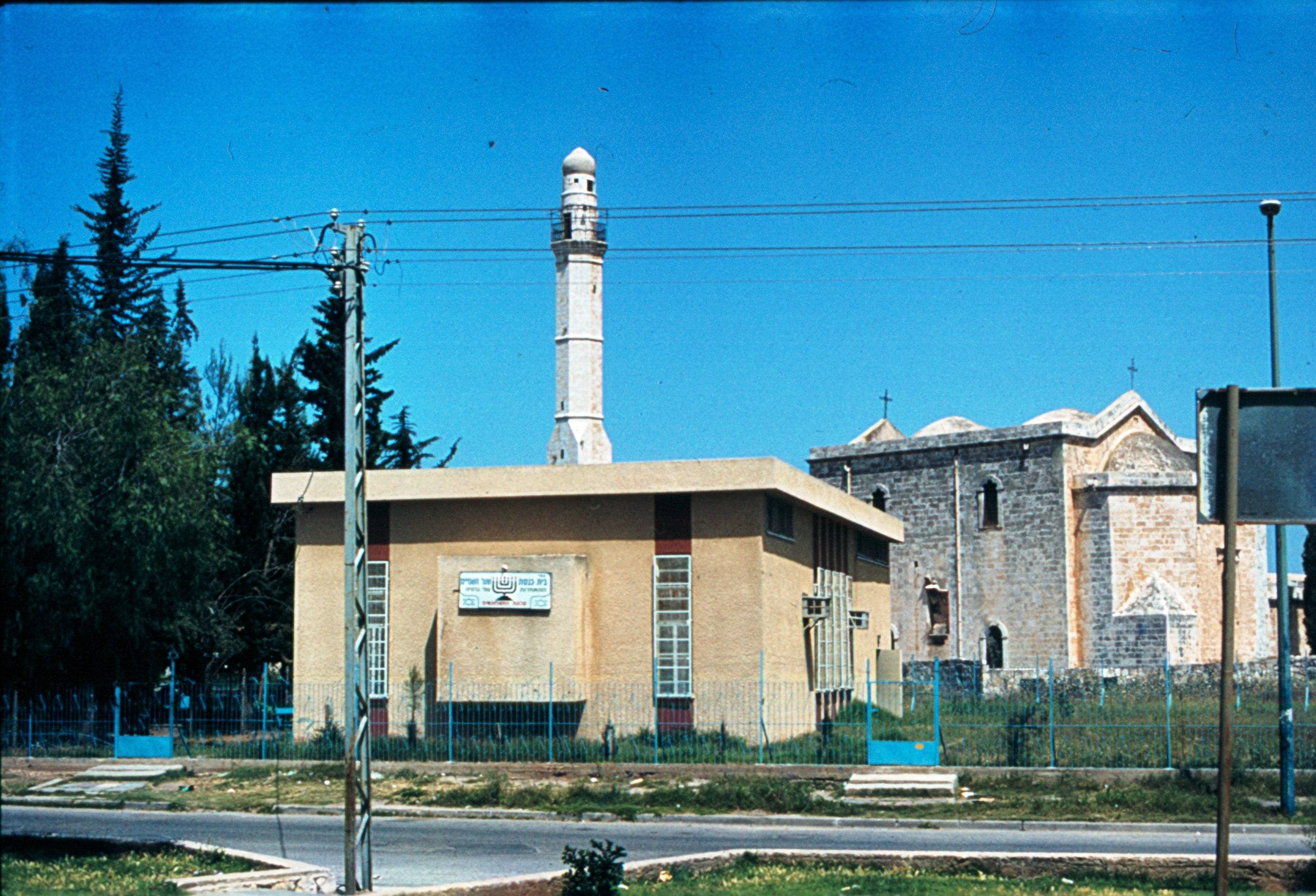
A modern Georgian synagogue, adjacent to the historic Church of Saint George and Mosque of Al-Khadr, Lod

In the early 19th century, only Jerusalem, Safed and Tiberias had small yet significant minority Jewish populations living alongside the majority Arabs. These populations grew to become about half the cities' populations by the start of the British Mandate. Immigration and settlement also took place on the outskirts of the cities of Jaffa (these outskirts later became known as Tel Aviv) and Haifa during the same period. As a result of the Palestinian expulsions and fleeing of violence during 1948, Safed and Tiberias were depopulated of all Palestinian Arabs and became exclusively Jewish, whilst Jerusalem was split into Jewish West Jerusalem and Palestinian Arab East Jerusalem. Of those "original" mixed cities, only Haifa remained mixed after the war. However, after 1948 only about 3,000 of its 70,000 Palestinian Arab residents remained in Haifa; these remaining Palestinian Arabs were then moved into small areas of the city by the new Israeli authorities. Today, about 12% of Haifa's residents are Palestinian Arab.

Ramla, Lod, Jaffa and Acre became mixed as a result of the 1948 Palestinian expulsion and flight. These cities had almost 100% Palestinian Arab populations prior to 1948, but after the war only about 1,000 Palestinian Arabs remained in Ramla and Lod, and 13,000 in Acre, mostly in the poorest segments of society and initially restricted to segregated compounds under Israeli martial law. Internally displaced Palestinians from other areas moved to the cities in subsequent decades; today Palestinian Arabs account for c.30% of Lod's population, c.25% of Ramle's, c.30% of Acre's, and c.5% of Tel Aviv-Jaffa.

The unique cities of Nof Hagalil and Ma'alot-Tarshiha became mixed through Israeli Arab influx and a municipal merger, respectively. In Nof Hagalil, the population is almost 30% Arab, but the municipality has refused to allow the building of any churches, mosques or Arabic-speaking schools.

== Integration ==
The term "mixed cities" should not be confused with multicultural cities, nor understood to necessarily imply social integration. Yara Hawari describes significant geographical segregation and social exclusion within each of the eight cities, which contradicts "Israel's self-image as a pluralist and democratic society" and the "narrative of continuous historical coexistence". Most Arabs in mixed cities live in predominantly Arab neighborhoods, and studies have shown significant inequality in municipal resource allocation, and wide socio-economic gaps in welfare, housing and education between the two communities. According to the New York Times, even towns "portrayed as models of peaceful coexistence fester with resentments born of double standards."

In October 2021, following the May 2021 racial riots centered in the mixed cities, the Israeli government approved a new five-year plan aimed at reducing years of state neglect of the inequalities between Jewish and Arab citizens, with an emphasis on addressing Israel's mixed city problems.

== Education ==
Religious affiliation is a significant determinator in school designation. Christians, Muslims, and Jews are the main populations integrated in mixed cities. This religious segregation makes it hard for teachers to create multicultural experiences in schools. Religiously mixed educational institutions face similar challenges to integration in mixed cities. Teachers in mixed schools create ceremonies that emphasize multiple cultures. These ceremonies fail to address essential narratives about religious and racially diverse identities. Mixed schools teach Arabic as well as Hebrew, however Jewish students do not always acquire Arabic speaking skills. Recent data show that Arab kindergarten teachers in Jewish schools have a positive impact on the student's multicultural acceptance. The same goes for Jewish teachers in Arab schools. In most mixed cities, Arabs and Jews are not geographically segregated. Most schools in mixed cities are segregated. Jewish students go to Jewish schools, Arab students go to Arab schools. These schools have different curriculums. Schools are divided by language (Hebrew or Arabic), race, religion, and nationality.

== Demographics ==
=== Mixed cities ===
	Percentages												Population			Index of dissimilarity
	Ottoman Syria		Mandatory Palestine				Israel									Index of dissimilarity
	1872		1922		1945		1951		1990		Current					Index of dissimilarity
	Jews	Arabs	Jews and Others	Arabs	Jews	Arabs	Jews	Arabs	Jews	Arabs	Jews and others	Arabs	Jews and others	Arabs	Total	Index of dissimilarity
Current Mixed Cities																
Jerusalem (including occupied East Jerusalem)	26%	74%	55%	45%	62%	38%	n.a.	n.a.	72%	28%	61%	39%	584,352	366,797	951,149	96%
Jaffa	0%	100%	42%	58%	30%	70%	98%	2%	96%	4%	63%	37%	29,000	17,000	46,000	82% (Tel Aviv-Yafo)
Acre	1%	99%	3%	97%	0.4%	99.6%	73%	27%	77%	23%	67%	33%	33,331	16,171	49,502	2%
Nof HaGalil (formerly Nazareth Illit)	n.a.	n.a.	n.a.	n.a.	n.a.	n.a.	n.a.	n.a.			70%	30%	29,209	12,730	41,939	25%
Lod	0%	100%	0.1%	99.9%	0.1%	99.9%	93%	7%	79%	21%	70%	30%	56,789	24,142	80,931	73%
Ramla	0%	100%	0.5%	99.5%	0%	100%	89%	11%	83%	17%	76%	24%	58,292	18,694	76,986	71%
Ma'alot-Tarshiha	0%	100%	0%	100%	0%	100%	0%	100%			78%	22%	17,251	4,870	22,121	79%
Haifa	2%	98%	26%	74%	55%	45%	95%	5%	91%	9%	88%	12%	249,773	33,963	283,736	74%
Historical Mixed Cities																
Safed	48%	52%	34%	66%	20%	80%	100%	0%			98%	2%	36,692	781	37,473	n.a.
Tiberias	64%	36%	64%	36%	54%	46%	100%	0%			98%	2%	45,981	717	46,698	n.a.

=== Other mixed areas ===
According to publicist Afif Abu Much, the eight mixed cities are the main places in Israel in which Jews and Arabs encounter each other, and very limited population mixing exists outside of these eight cities.

According to Ha'aretz in 2015, only 16,000 Arabs are thought to be living in the 16 localities not officially defined as mixed cities, or in Jewish neighborhoods of Haifa, Jerusalem and Tel Aviv. According to the 2020 population statistics the vast majority of other Jewish- or Arab-majority localities in Israel have between 0% and 1% of the other population group. According to the Israel Central Bureau of Statistics, the only sizeable exceptions are the Jewish majority cities of Eilat (5% Arab), Carmiel (4%), Qiryat Shemona (3%), Arad (3%), Beersheva (3%), Nahariyya (2%), Safed (2%) and Tiberias (2%), and the Arab-majority cities of Mi'elya (3% Jewish) and Jaljulye (2%).

== See also ==
- Arab localities in Israel

== Bibliography ==
=== General ===
- Yacobi, H. (2009). The Jewish-Arab City: Spatio-politics in a Mixed Community. Routledge Studies on the Arab-Israeli Conflict. Taylor & Francis. ISBN 978-1-134-06584-4.
- Klein, M.; Watzman, H. (2014). Lives in Common: Arabs and Jews in Jerusalem, Jaffa and Hebron. Hurst. ISBN 978-0-19-939626-9.
- Monterescu, D.; Rabinowitz, D. (2016). Mixed Towns, Trapped Communities: Historical Narratives, Spatial Dynamics, Gender Relations and Cultural Encounters in Palestinian-Israeli Towns. Taylor & Francis. ISBN 978-1-317-09531-6.
- Shohamy, E.G.; Rafael, E.B.; Barni, M. (2010). "Linguistic Landscape in Mixed Cities in Israel from the Perspective of 'Walkers': The Case of Arabic". Linguistic Landscape in the City. Multilingual Matters. ISBN 978-1-84769-297-9.
- Cohen, E. (1973). Integration Vs. Separation in the Planning of a Mixed Jewish-Arab City in Israel. Levi Eshkol Institute for Economic, Social and Political Research, Hebrew University.
- Tzfadia, Erez (2011). "Mixed Cities in Israel: Localities of Contentions". Israel Studies Review. 26 (1). Berghahn Books: 153–165. doi:10.3167/isr.2011.260114. eISSN 2159-0389. ISSN 2159-0370. JSTOR 41804751.
- Karlinsky, Nahum (9 August 2021). "Revisiting Israel's Mixed Cities Trope". Journal of Urban History. 47 (5). SAGE Publications: 1103–1129. doi:10.1177/00961442211029835. ISSN 0096-1442. S2CID 236980585.
- Tzfadia, E.; Yacobi, H. (2011). Rethinking Israeli Space: Periphery and Identity. Routledge Advances in Middle East and Islamic Studies. Taylor & Francis. ISBN 978-1-136-72605-7.
- Rabinowitz, Dan; Monterescu, Daniel (2008). "Reconfiguring the "Mixed Town": Urban Transformations of Ethnonational Relations in Palestine and Israel". International Journal of Middle East Studies. 40 (2). Cambridge University Press: 195–226. doi:10.1017/S0020743808080513. eISSN 1471-6380. ISSN 0020-7438. JSTOR 30069610. S2CID 162633906.
- Falah, Ghazi (1996). "Living Together Apart: Residential Segregation in Mixed Arab-Jewish Cities in Israel". Urban Studies. 33 (6). SAGE Publications: 823–857. Bibcode:1996UrbSt..33..823F. doi:10.1080/00420989650011627. ISSN 0042-0980. S2CID 153654851.
- Yiftachel, Oren; Yacobi, Haim (2003). "Urban Ethnocracy: Ethnicization and the Production of Space in an Israeli 'Mixed City'". Environment and Planning D: Society and Space. 21 (6). SAGE Publications: 673–693. Bibcode:2003EnPlD..21..673Y. doi:10.1068/d47j. ISSN 0263-7758. S2CID 55728367.
- Shdema, Ilan; Haj-Yahya, Nasreen; Schnell, Izhak (29 January 2018). "The social space of Arab residents of mixed Israeli cities". Geografiska Annaler: Series B, Human Geography. 100 (4). Informa UK Limited: 359–376. doi:10.1080/04353684.2018.1428496. ISSN 0435-3684. S2CID 148677166.
- Diab, Ahmed Baker; Shdema, Ilan; Schnell, Izhak (28 July 2021). "Arab integration in new and established mixed cities in Israel". Urban Studies. 59 (9). SAGE Publications: 004209802110213. Bibcode:2022UrbSt..59.1800D. doi:10.1177/00420980211021346. ISSN 0042-0980. S2CID 237700652.
- Sadeh, Shuki (25 December 2015). "A Growing Arab Middle Class Makes a Home in Jewish Cities". Haaretz.com.
- Shdema, Ilan; Haj-Yahya, Nasreen; Schnell, Izhak (29 January 2018). "The social space of Arab residents of mixed Israeli cities". Geografiska Annaler: Series B, Human Geography. 100 (4). Informa UK Limited: 359–376. doi:10.1080/04353684.2018.1428496. ISSN 0435-3684. S2CID 148677166.

=== Specific locations ===
- Monterescu, D. (2015). Jaffa Shared and Shattered: Contrived Coexistence in Israel/Palestine. Public Cultures of the Middle East and North Africa. Indiana University Press. ISBN 978-0-253-01683-6.
- Shtern, Marik (2016). "Urban neoliberalism vs. ethno-national division: The case of West Jerusalem's shopping malls". Cities. 52. Elsevier BV: 132–139. doi:10.1016/j.cities.2015.11.019. ISSN 0264-2751.
- Zubi, Himmat (2018). "The Ongoing Nakba: Urban Palestinian Survival in Haifa". In Nahla Abdo; Nur Masalha (eds.). An Oral History of the Palestinian Nakba. Bloomsbury Publishing. pp. 182–208. ISBN 978-1-78699-351-9.
- Karlinsky, Nahum (2012). "The Limits of Separation: Jaffa and Tel Aviv before 1948: The Underground Story" (PDF). In Maoz Azaryahu; S. Ilan Troen (eds.). Tel-Aviv at 100: Myths, Memories and Realities. Bloomington & Indianapolis: Indiana University Press. pp. 138–164.

=== Population data ===
- Israel Central Bureau of Statistics, "Settlements"
