= Route 899 (Israel) =

Road in Israel

Route 899
- כביש 899
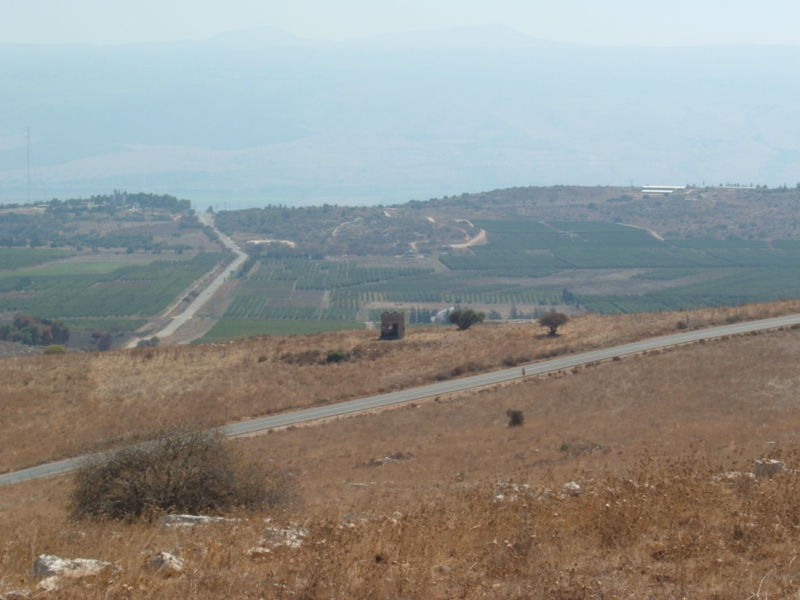

Route information
- Length: 63 km (39 mi)

Major junctions
- West end: Betzet junction
- East end: Ko'ah junction

Location
- Country: Israel

Highway system
- Roads in Israel; Highways
← Route 888	→ Route 918

Route 899 is an east-west regional highway in the Upper Galilee in northern Israel. For almost its entire length of 63 km, it proceeds parallel to the nearby border between Israel and Lebanon. In Israel, Route 899 is commonly known as the "northern route" (Hebrew: כביש הצפון, Kevish HaTzafon).

== History ==
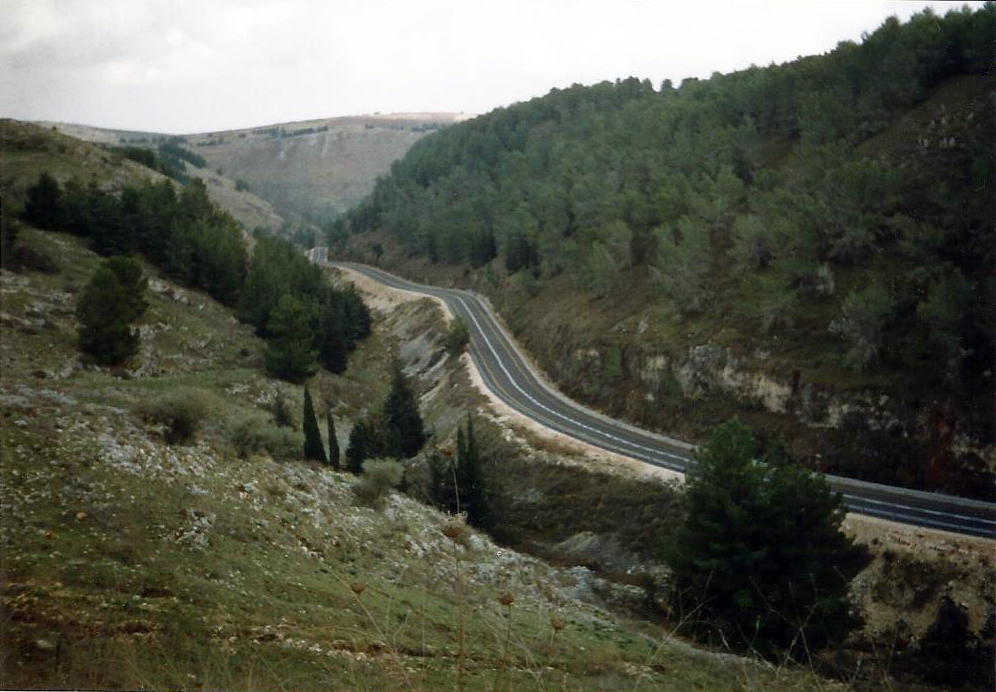
Scenic Route 899

The road was paved in 1937 as part of the efforts to suppress the Arab revolt. After the road was paved, a fence was placed alongside it called the "northern fence" or "Tegart's wall," which was completed in July 1938. This fence continued south from the area of Metzudat Koach toward Lake Kinneret. On the side of the road were placed Tegart fortresses, which are now located in Ya'ara, Shomera, Sasa, Avivim and Metzudat Koach. Sixteen pillboxes were built alongside the road between the fortresses. Under the control of the British Mandate in Palestine, access to the road was not open, requiring special permission. The road began alongside the village Basa, what is now Betzet and the city Shlomi, and ended at the point next to Metzudat Koach, while it passed near the large Arab settlements. The road was paved several kilometres from the border with Lebanon. The northern fence was taken down in 1942, but the fortresses and pillboxes remained along the length of the road.

== The Road Today ==
The present-day path of the road is primarily parallel to the old British Mandate road, but it differs in a number of locations. The road underwent many renovations and improvements. In several places on the route, signs point to the "old northern road" to sections of a few kilometres that pass just north of the present-day road and return to merge into the same one. The national transportation authority sometimes prepares new segments that pass along the backsides of the northern settlements, making the road more distant from the border between Israel and Lebanon. This enables access to the communities from the south, away from it and toward most of Israel's area.

The "northern route" is numbered 899 in the national highway numbering system. It begins in the west at Betzet junction, next to the Mediterranean shore between Rosh HaNikra and Akhziv, where it meets Highway 4. The road climbs via Shefa Valley and turns south to Even Menachem and Netu'a. It meets Highway 89 at Hiram junction near Sasa and afterward follows the path of Nahal Dishon. After Malkia, the road descends into Kadesh Valley and splits away from the international border with Lebanon. After Metzudat Koach, the road slopes precipitously downward toward the Hula Valley and ends at Ko'ah junction, where it meets Highway 90.

== Junctions (West to East) ==
District	Location	km	mi	Name	Destinations	Notes
Northern	Betzet	0	0.0	צומת בצת (Betzet Junction)	Highway 4	
Northern	Shlomi	2.5	1.6	צומת שלומי (Shlomi Junction)	Road 8990	
Northern	Shlomi	3	1.9	צומת חניתה (Hanita Junction)	Highway 70	
Northern	Adamit	6	3.7	צומת אדמית (Adamit Junction)	Road 8993	
Northern	Ya'ara	7	4.3	צומת יערה (Ya'ara Junction)	Entrance to Ya'ara	
Northern	Elion	10	6.2	צומת אילון (Eilon Junction)	Bein HaNehalim Road	
Northern	Goren	12	7.5	צומת גורן (Goren junction)	Entrance to Goren	
Northern	Gornot HaGalil	13	8.1	צומת גרנות הגליל (Gornot HaGalil Junction)	Road 8996	
Northern	Shomera	16.5	10.3	צומת שומרה (Shomera Junction)	Road 8998	
Northern	Even Menachem	17.5	10.9	צומת אבן מנחם (Even Menachem Junction)	Road 8933	
Northern	Netu'a	22	14	צומת נטועה (Netu'a Junction)	Road 8999	
Northern	Biranit	24.5	15.2	מחנה בירנית (Biranit Camp)	Road 8944	
Northern	Biranit	25.5	15.8	מחנה בירנית (Biranit Camp)	Road 8933	
Northern	Mattat	27.5	17.1	צומת מתת (Mattat Junction)	Road 8935	
Northern	Sasa	33	21	צומת סאסא (Sasa Junction)	Highway 89	
Northern	Sasa	33.5	20.8	צומת חירם (Hiram Junction)	Highway 89	
Northern	Dovev	35.5	22.1	צומת דוב"ב (Dovev Junction)	Road 8967	
Northern	Bar'am	37.5	23.3	צומת ברעם (Bar'am Junction)	Road 8963	
Northern	Rehaniya	40.5	25.2	צומת ריחאניה (Rehaniya Junction)	Road 8966	
Northern	Yir'on	43.5	27.0	צומת יראון (Yir'on Junction)	Entrance to Yir'on	
Northern	Avivim	46	29	צומת אביבים (Avivim Junction)	Road 8967	
Northern	Malkia	52	32	צומת מלכיה (Malkia Junction)	Entrance to Malkia	
Northern	Ramot Naftali	57.5	35.7	צומת האלה (Ha'Ela Junction)	Route 886 (northbound)	
Northern	Ramot Naftali	58	36	צומת ישע (Yesha Junction)	Route 886 (southbound)	
Northern	Hula Valley	63	39	צומת כ"ח (Ko'ah Junction)	Highway 90	
1.000 mi = 1.609 km; 1.000 km = 0.621 mi: Concurrency terminus

== See also ==
- List of highways in Israel
