= Amal Bishara =

Israeli Arab immunogeneticist

- أمل بشارة
- Education: Hebrew University of Jerusalem
- Scientific career
- Fields: Immunogenetics
- Workplaces: Hadassah Medical Center in Jerusalem

Amal Bishara (Arabic: أمل بشارة) is an Israeli Arab doctor, and the director of Bone Marrow Registry Outreach, Hadassah Medical Center, which is associated with the Hebrew University of Jerusalem. There she runs the only bone marrow transplant registry in the world for unrelated Arab donors. Dr. Amal has published and presented internationally on her research into immunogenetics. She serves on the Accreditation Committee of the European Federation for Immunogenetics.

== Early life and education ==
Amal Bishara is an Arab Israeli . She was born in Tarshiha near Ma’alot in the region of Galilee.

In 1976, she became a member of the tissue typing lab at Hadassah Medical Center, which is associated with The Hebrew University. There she obtained a post-graduate degree, followed by a doctorate in microbiology and immunology. After post-doctoral work in Boston, she accepted a position at Hadassah Medical Center in 1988. There she enjoys “the combination of clinical practice and clinical research, she published more than 40 papers and participated in many national and international meeting.”

== Career ==
In 2008, Dr. Bishara established the only bone marrow transplant registry in the world for unrelated Arab donors, the Bone Marrow Registry Outreach, at Hadassah Medical Center. She works closely with Prof. Chaim Brautbar, who founded Hadassah's tissue typing laboratory, and Dr. Shoshana Israel, who currently directs the unit.

In the case of stem cell transplants, the HLA tissue type of the patient and the donor must be a match. Inheritance of HLA types tends to occur within ethnic groups, making it particularly difficult to find a match in some populations. As a result of genetic homogeneity, Arabs are much more likely to find a related bone marrow donor (60%). However, approximately 40% of all Arab patients do not find a match within their families. Such patients are unlikely to find unrelated matches from the usual international bone marrow registries (10%). The vast majority (90%) of Arab cases requesting matches for bone marrow transplants involve children with genetic diseases due to genetically close intermarriage.

Beginning in 2008, Dr. Amal and her volunteers have provided educational programs and carried out donor recruitment campaigns in Arab towns. In spite of restrictions on travel between Israel and the territories, Dr. Bishara has been able to match donors and patients from the West Bank, including Ramallah, Beit Sahour, and Hebron. By 2016, Dr. Bishara's project listed over 34,000 possible donors. The donors from the Arab registry are also listed in the American National Marrow Donor Program (NMDP) and the World Marrow Donor Association (WMDA). She runs the Arab bone marrow registry, with over 15,000 members.

== Awards ==
Dr. Bishara presented to the organization Bone Marrow Donors Worldwide (BMDW) in 2010, and was recognized by them with an award in 2013. She also has been recognized as an outstanding female scientist in the Women in Science Hall of Fame. The award was presented by US Ambassador to Israel HE Daniel Shapiro at the Embassy of the United States in Cairo, Egypt.
