= Route 886 (Israel) =

Route in Israel

Route 886
- כביש 886

Route information
- Length: 39.5 km (24.5 mi)

Major junctions
- South end: Ein Zeitim Junction
- North end: Misgav Am Junction

Location
- Country: Israel

Highway system
- Roads in Israel; Highways
← Route 869	→ Route 888

Route 886 is a regional north-south highway in the far north of Israel. It begins in the south at Highway 89 and ends in the north at Route 899.

== Junctions (South to North) ==
District	Location	km	mi	Name	Destinations	Notes
Northern	Ein Zeitim	0	0.0	צומת עין זיתים (Ein Zeitim Junction)	Highway 89	
Northern	Dalton; Jish	4	2.5	צומת דלתון (Dalton Junction)	Road 8865; Road 8867	
Northern	Rehaniya	9	5.6	צומת דלתון (Rehaniya Junction)	Road 8966	
Northern	Dishon	17.5	10.9	צומת דישון (Dishon Junction)	Road 8975	
Northern	Ramot Naftali	19.5	12.1	צומת רמות נפתלי (Ramot Naftali Junction)	Road 8977	
Northern	Ramot Naftali	22	14	צומת ישע (Yesha Junction)	Route 899	
Northern	Ramot Naftali	22.7	14.1	צומת האלה (Ha'Ela Junction)	Route 899	
Northern	Manara	32.5	20.2	צומת מנרה (Manara Junction)	Road 9771	
Northern	Margaliot	37	23	צומת מרגליות (Margaliot Junction)	Road 9977	
Northern	Misgav Am	39.5	24.5	צומת משגב עם (Misgav Am Junction)	Entrance to Misgav Am	
1.000 mi = 1.609 km; 1.000 km = 0.621 mi: Concurrency terminus

== See also ==
- List of highways in Israel
