= Route 888 (Israel) =

Route in Israel

Route 888
- כביש 888
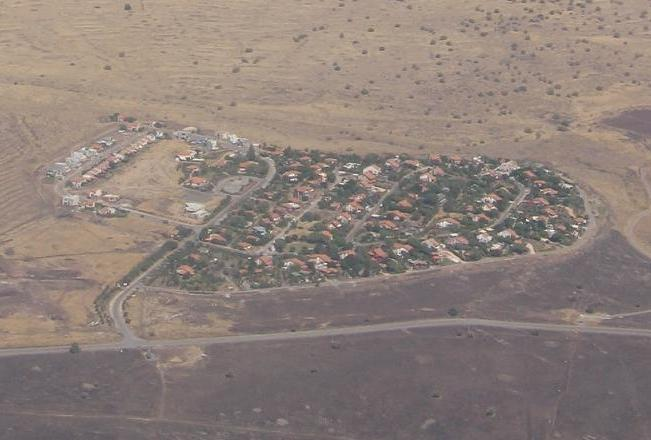
- Route 888 at the entrance to Had Ness

Route information
- Length: 13 km (8.1 mi)

Major junctions
- South end: Highway 87
- North end: Highway 91

Location
- Country: Israel

Highway system
- Roads in Israel; Highways
← Route 886	→ Route 899

Route 888 is a north-south regional highway in northern Israel. It begins at Beit Tzida junction with Highway 87 and ends at Beit HaMekhes junction with Highway 91.

== Junctions (South to North) ==
District	Location	km	mi	Name	Destinations	Notes
Northern	Bethsaida	0	0.0	צומת בית צידה (Bethsaida Junction)	Highway 87	
Northern	Had Ness	3	1.9	צומת חד נס (Had Ness Junction)	Kineret Street	
Northern	Customs office	13	8.1	צומת בית המכס (Customs House Junction)	Highway 91	
1.000 mi = 1.609 km; 1.000 km = 0.621 mi

== See also ==
- List of highways in Israel
