= Hosen =

Hosen: חֹסֶן (Hebrew)
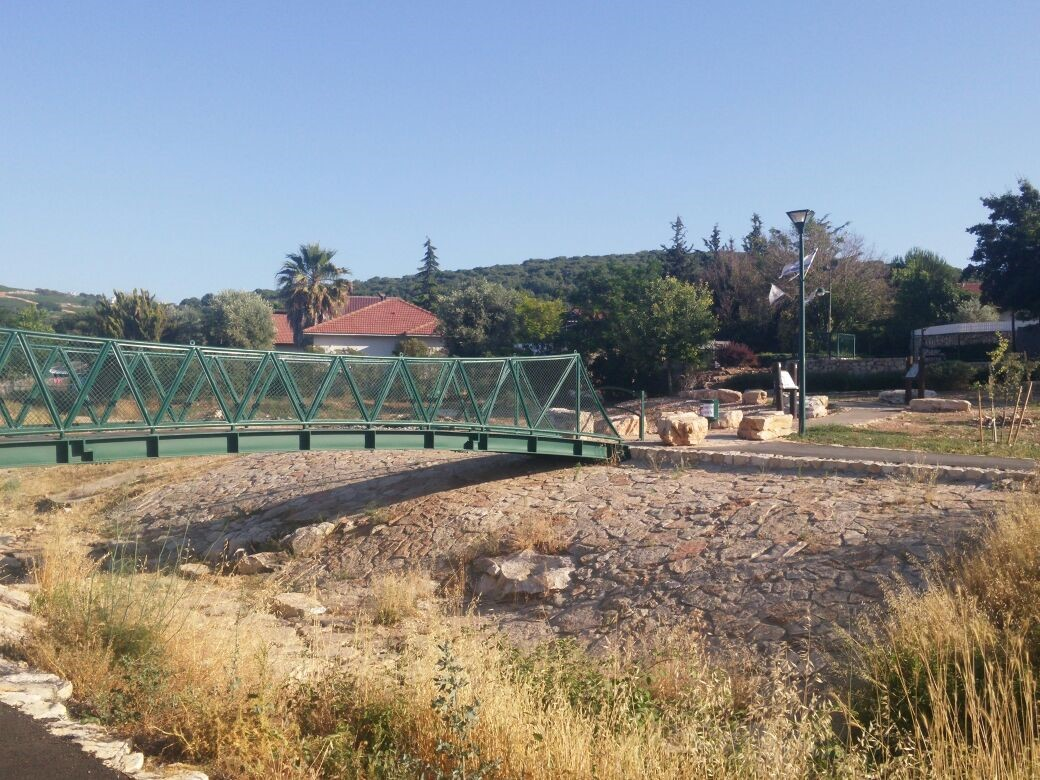

- Location within Northwest Israel Location within Israel
- Coordinates: 32°59′54″N 35°17′51″E
- Country: Israel
- District: Northern
- Subdistrict: Acre
- Council: Ma'ale Yosef
- Affiliation: Mishkei Herut Beitar
- Founded: 1949
- Founder: Herut members
- Population (2024): 1,284

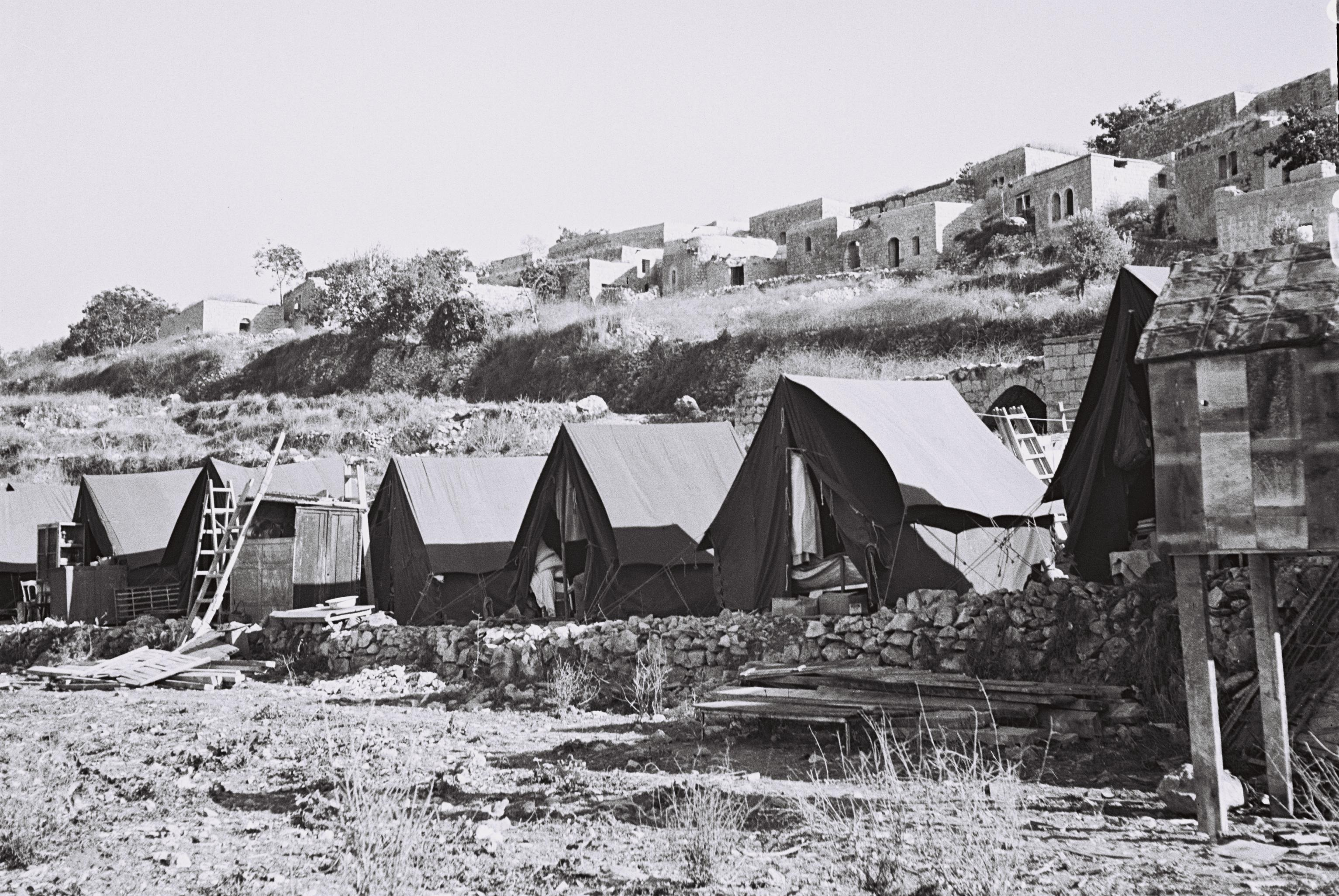
Hosen in 1949. Caption describes first inhabitants as being from North Africa

Hosen (Hebrew: חֹסֶן, חוסן, lit. 'Strength') is a moshav in northern Israel. Located near Ma'alot-Tarshiha, it falls under the jurisdiction of Ma'ale Yosef Regional Council. In 2024 it had a population of 1,284.

== History ==
The village was established in 1949 by members of Herut on land which had belonged to the depopulated Palestinian village of Suhmata.
