= Mi'ilya =

Mi'ilya: מִעִלְיָא; معليا
- Local council (from 1957)

Hebrew transcription(s)
  - ISO 259: Miˁilyaˀ
  - Also spelled: Malia (unofficial)
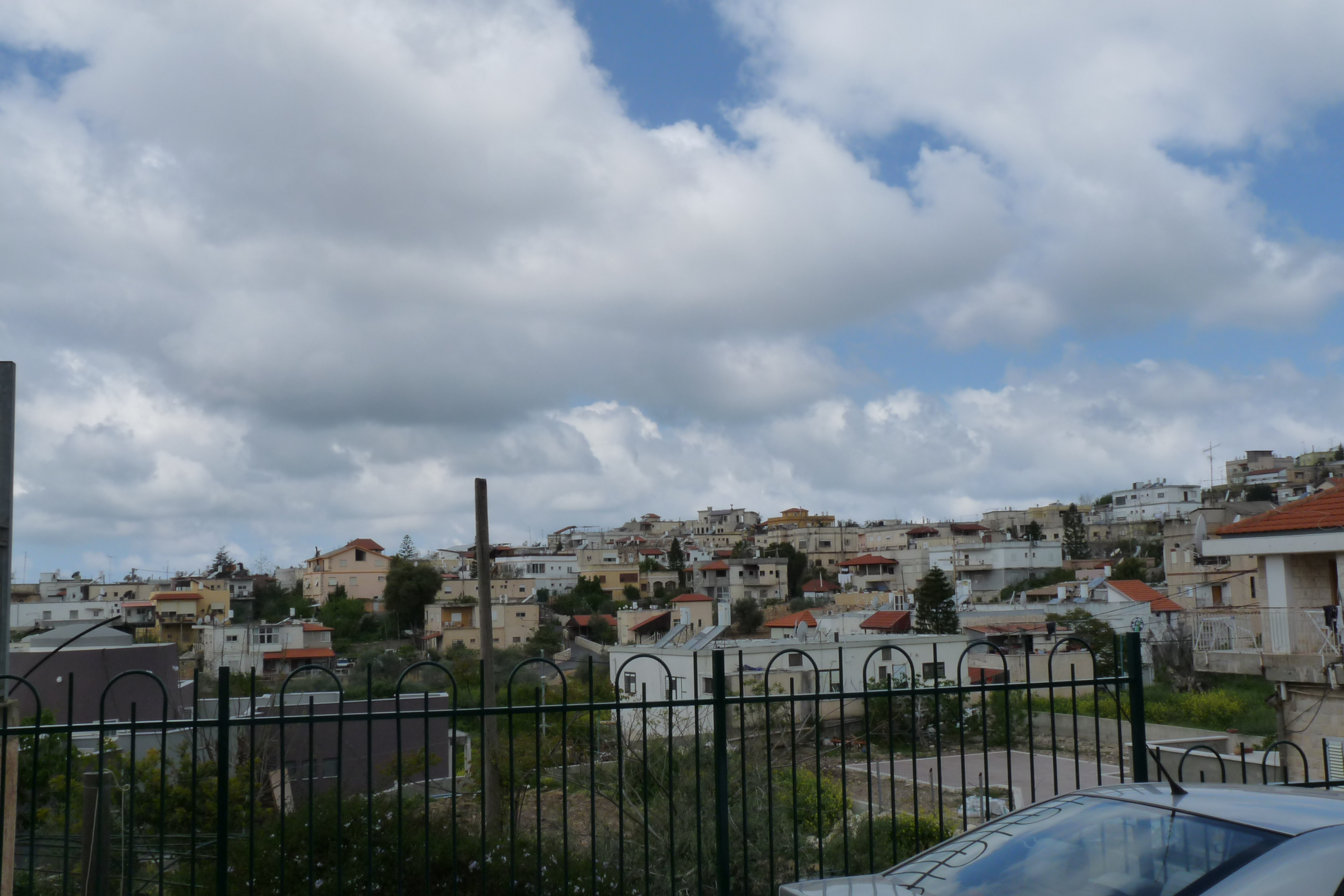

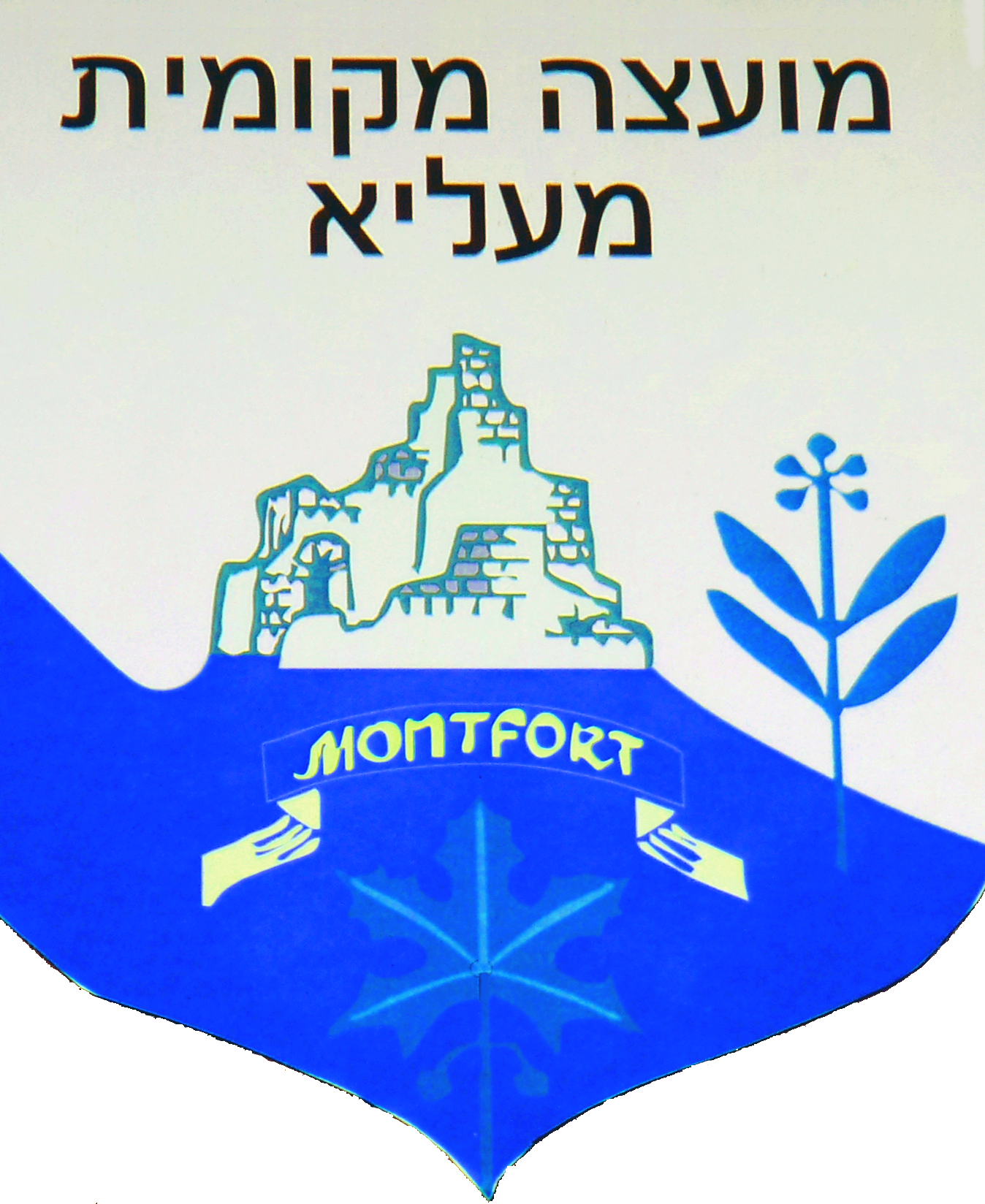

- Location within Northwest Israel Location within Israel
- Coordinates: 33°1′31″N 35°15′34″E
- Grid position: 174/269 PAL
- Country: Israel
- District: Northern
- Subdistrict: Acre
- Natural Region: Yehi'am
- Founded: Prior to 1160

Area
  - Total: 1,365 dunams (1.365 km^{2}; 0.527 sq mi)

Population (2024)
  - Total: 3,323
  - Density: 2,434/km^{2} (6,305/sq mi)

Ethnicity
  - Arabs: 97.5%
  - Jews and others: 2.5%
- Name meaning: "The High place"

Mi'ilya (Arabic: معليا; Hebrew: מִעִלְיָא), also called Mi'elya, is an Arab local council in the western Galilee in the Northern District of Israel. Its name during the Kingdom of Jerusalem era in Galilee was Castellum Regis. In 2024 it had a population of 3,323, all of whom are Melkite Greek Catholics. The town is located immediately to the northwest of Ma'alot-Tarshiha. Archaeological excavations have found remains from the Late Bronze Age through to the Ottoman period.

== History ==
Archaeological excavations in Mi'ilya gives indication of inhabitation from the Late Bronze Age and Iron Age, as well as Hellenistic, Roman, Byzantine, Crusader, Mamluk and Ottoman periods. Remains include a mosaic carpet with a Greek inscription, dating from the fifth or early sixth century CE.

=== Crusader period ===
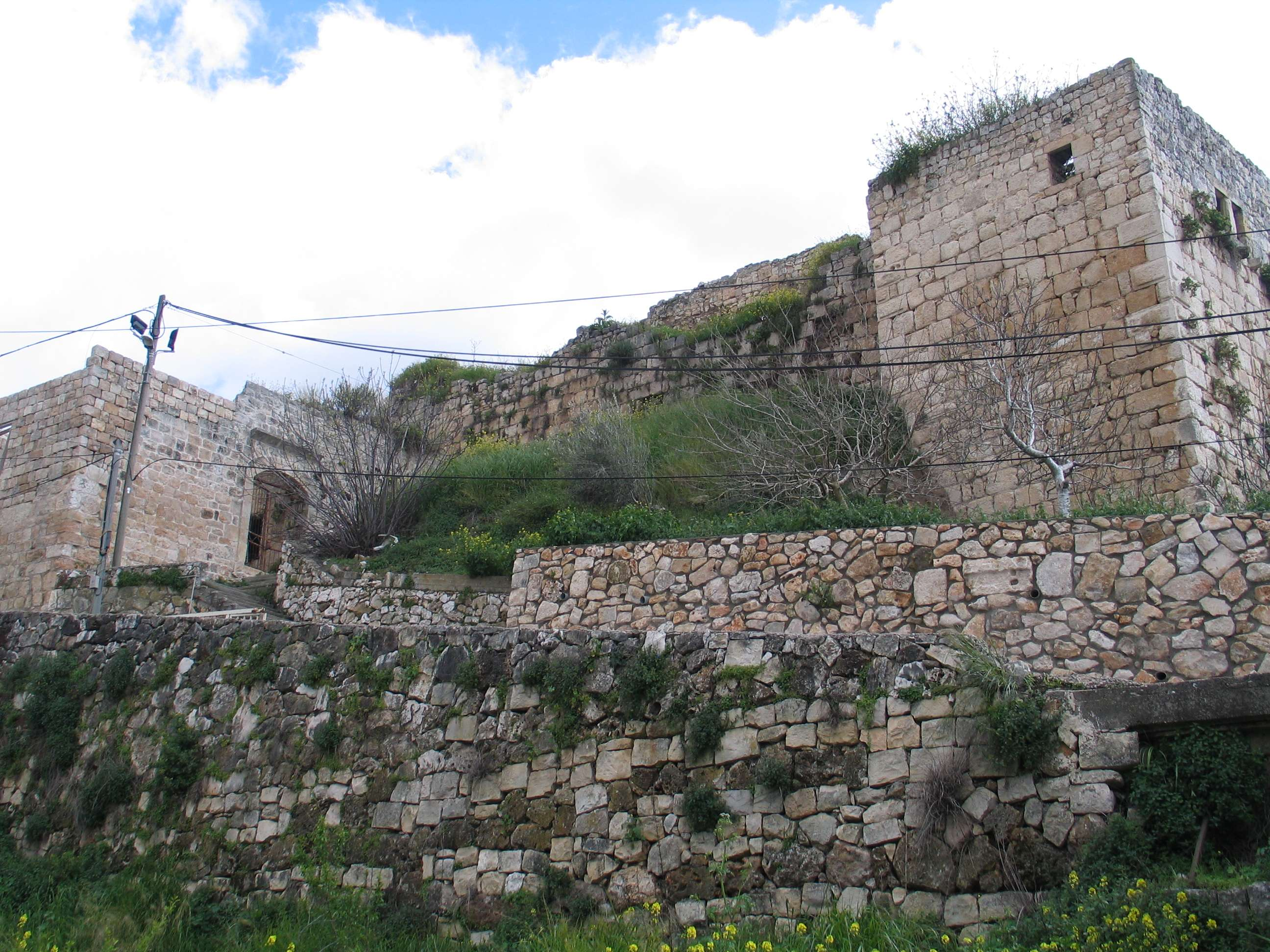
King's castle, 2009

In the Crusader period, Mi'ilya and its castle, Castellum Regis ('King's Castle') were first mentioned in 1160, when they and several surrounding villages were transferred to a Crusader named Iohanni de Caypha (Johannes of Haifa). It was probably built during King Baldwin III's reign and possessed one of the largest wineries in the Crusader states.

By 1179 the castle had apparently been rebuilt, as it was then called Castellum Novo ('New Castle'). That year, Viscountess Petronella of Acre sold the houses, vineyards and gardens of Mi'ilya to Count Jocelyn III, uncle of King Baldwin IV.. In 1182, Baldwin IV granted the castle to his uncle, Jocelyn III. At this time it was called "The new castle in the mountains of Acre". In 1183, Baldwin IV transferred a house that he had bought in Mi'ilya from the scribe, John of Bogalet, in addition to other possessions in the vicinity of Mi'ilya to the same uncle, Jocelyn III.

In 1187 Mi'ilya and its castle fell to the Ayyubid sultan Saladin. In 1188 it was granted by Conrad of Montferrat to the Pisans who were defending Acre, but it is unclear if they ever took control of it.

In 1220 Jocelyn III's daughter Beatrix de Courtenay and her husband Otto von Botenlauben, Count of Henneberg, sold Mi'ilya to the Teutonic Knights on 31 May, for the sum of 7,000 marks of silver. This included Mi'ilya with its dependencies, and a third of the fief of St. George de la Beyne (see Deir al-Asad and Bi'ina). By then, the castle of Mi'ilya was superseded by the Teutonic-built Montfort Castle. In 1228, Jocelyn III's grandson James of Mandale sold his part to the Teutonic Knights. Between 1220 and 1243, the Teutonic Knights bought a number of properties from private owners around the castle. Another document from the year 1257 mentions a house and other property in Mi‘ilya that belonged to the Bishop of Acre.

=== Mamluk period ===
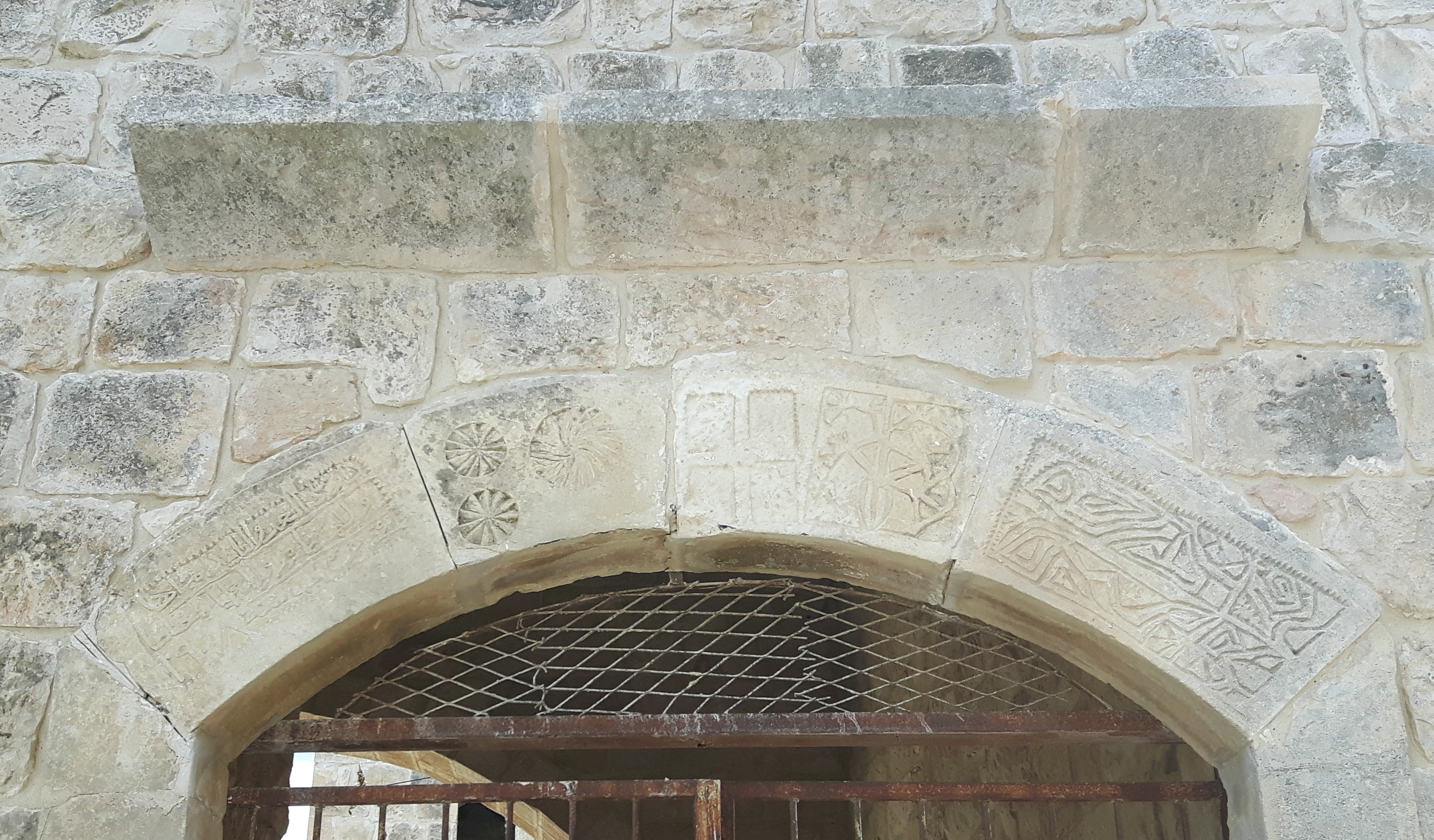
Inscription on the Mamluk gate

By 1268–1271 Mi'ilya was conquered by the Mamluk sultan Baybars. The Mamluks founded a mosque out of the Crusader church in Mi'ilya. The Syrian geographer al-Dimashqi noted Mi'ilya's "fine castle", and that close to it was a very pleasant valley, where musk-pears and large citrons were grown. The castle village became the seat of a qadi (Islamic judge) and in 1372 was noted as the administrative center of a district, 'Ma'ilya wa Shaghurayn' (Mi'ilya and the two Shaghurs).

=== Ottoman period ===
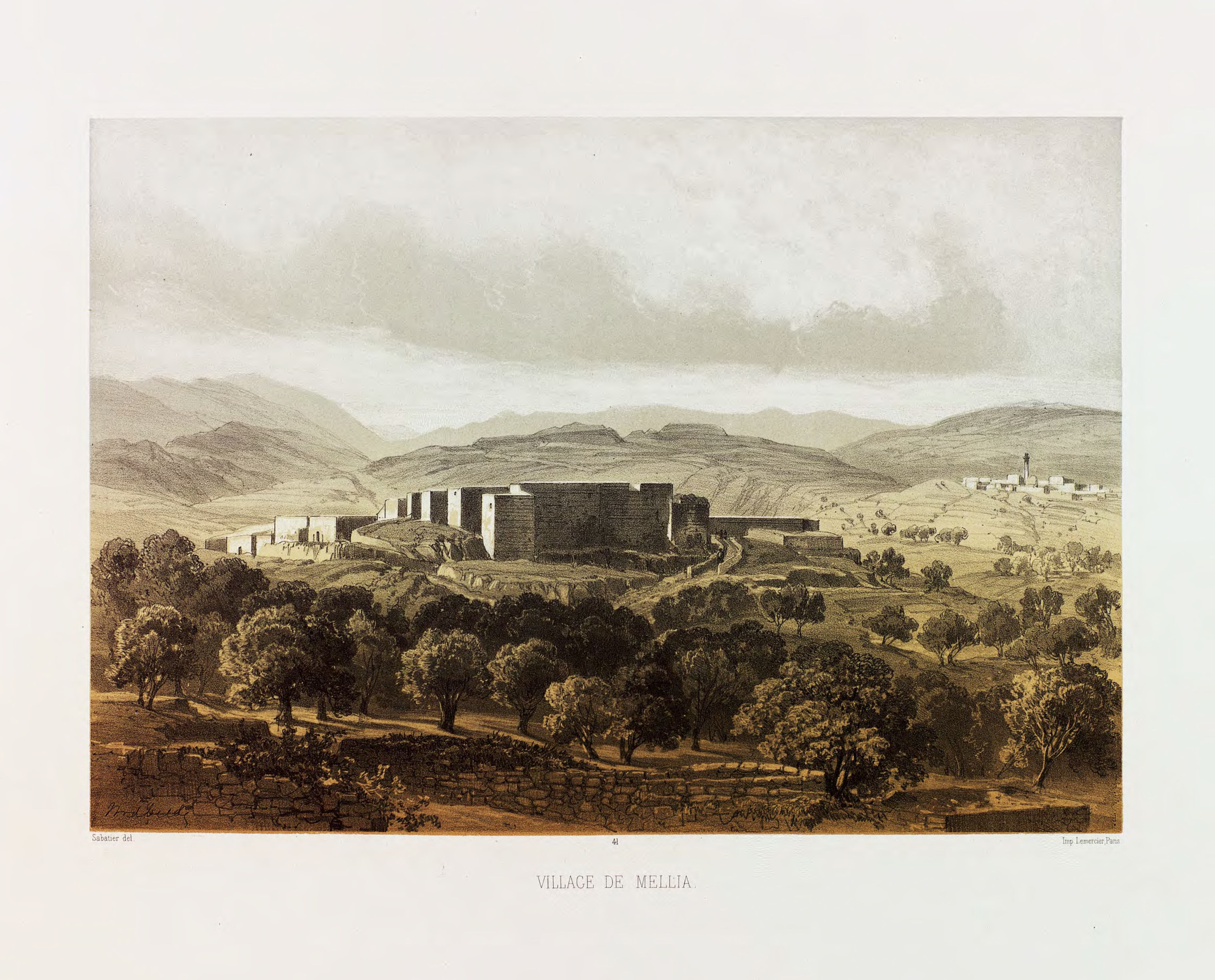
Mi'ilya, in 1851, by van de Velde

The Ottoman Empire conquered Palestine from the Mamluks in 1516. In 1548/1549 or 1596, Mi'ilya appeared in Ottoman tax registers as being in the nahiye of Acre, part of Liwa Safad (district of Safed), with a population of 15 Muslim households and 2 Christian households. The villagers paid a fixed tax-rate of 25% on various agricultural products, including wheat, barley, olives, and goats or beehives, a total of 2,151 akçe. In 1555/1556, the registers listed Mi'ilya as a mazra'a (farm).

The Melkite denomination was founded in 1724 when it broke away from the Greek Orthodox Church of Antioch. Melkites began moving to northern Palestine in great numbers during the 18th century under the auspices of regional strongman Sheikh Daher al-Umar. Daher captured the Jiddin fortress in Mi'ilya's vicinity in 1738 and gained control of its dependencies, including nearby Tarshiha. In the 1740s, Daher invited the Shufani family, Melkites from the Shuf area of Mount Lebanon, to farm silkworms in Tarshiha. The Shufanis were patronized by a leading family of that village and when they successfully defended them against another family, they were granted residency in Mi'ilya's castle. The conventional oral histories attribute Mi'ilya's establishment as a Melkite village to the Shufanis' settlement at that time. A 1753 correspondence to Pope Pope Benedict XIV concerning disputes between the Melkites and the Franciscans in the parish of Acre includes three signatories from Mi'ilya, the priest Sulayman Sa'ada, Ilyas Sa'ada, and Isa Sammur. According to historian Rabei Khamisy, this suggests the Sa'ada and Sammur families were earlier established Melkite families, perhaps living alongside Mi'ilya's handful of Muslim residents. The Shufanis likely joined them in the 1740s but the two families disappear from the record sometime after 1753 while Mi'ilya's Muslims moved to Tarshiha; thus, the Shufanis are more accurately the earliest of Mi'ilya's extant families.

Over a roughly ten-year period from the time that the Shufanis settled in Mi'ilya's castle, more Melkite families joined them there, namely the Abu Uqsa, Assaf, Qassis and Arraf. Each of these families gained property within the castle walls or clustered around it, until the village gradually expanded beyond the walls. The Shufanis possessed the bulk of the castle precincts, while the Abu Uqsa possess the northeastern interior space of the castle. The Assaf own the northeastern tower and the areas bordering it outside the castle walls; the Qassis own the northwestern tower and the areas west of it along the walls; the Arraf's area is near the southern entrance to the castle. (Note: The Assafs are purportedly related to the Haddadin–Ghassanid family of al-Karak and the Kisrawan and the Farhud family in Jordan. The first member to settle in Mi'ilya was Abd Allah, probably in the 1750s, and the family present in the village today descend from two of his four sons, Ibrahim and Yusuf.) Mi'ilya was mentioned by the Italian Giovanni Mariti, who described it as a hamlet where Greek Catholics sometimes used its ancient church. Not long after 1820, the Sabbagh family moved to Mi'ilya and gained possession of the southwestern corner of the castle precincts, which Khamisy assumes they purchased from the Shufanis, who continue to own most of the castle area. In 1838, Mi'liya was noted as a village in the al-Jabal district west of Safed. Referring to Mi'ilya, Victor Guérin found in 1875 that "on the highest part of the hill we remark the remains of an ancient fortress, flanked by four square towers; considerable portions remain, showing that it was built of regular blocks, some levelled plane and some embossed; the latter were reserved for the angles. The ruins and interior of this fortress are now inhabited by about twenty families, which have built their little habitations in the midst of the debris."

A population list from about 1887 showed Mi'ilya to have about 775 inhabitants, all Christians. In the 1881 PEF's Survey of Western Palestine Mi'ilya was described as being a large and well-built village of stone, containing 450 Christians, surrounded by olives and arable land. In 1890, Missionary Père Angelil requested the help of the nuns from the Lebanese village of Ain Ebel to teach the people of neighboring Mi'ilya for eight days. Following this, two nuns from Ain Ebel stayed behind to oversee the operation of the newly established school.

=== British Mandate ===
In the 1922 census of Palestine conducted by the British Mandatory authorities, Mi'ilya had a population of 442 inhabitants; 429 Christians and 13 Muslims. Of the Christians, 3 were Orthodox, 2 Catholics and 424 Greek Catholic (Melkite). The population had increased in the 1931 census to 579; 553 Christians, 25 Muslims and 1 Druze, in a total of 138 houses.

In the 1945 statistics, the population had increased to 900; 790 Christians and 110 Muslims, while the total land area was 29,084 dunams, according to an official land and population survey. Of this, 1,509 dunams were allocated for plantations and irrigable land, 2,883 for cereals, while 123 dunams were classified as built-up areas.

=== Israel ===
In the early part of 1948 the village suffered from food shortages and harassment from neighbouring Jewish areas. It was captured by the Israel Defense Forces during Operation Hiram at the end of October. After a short fight, most of population fled into the countryside. The following day the local IDF commander allowed them to return to their homes. This was one of the few occasions when villagers were allowed back into their villages after they had left. The Ministry for Minority Affairs reported that a further 25 villagers were expelled in March being suspected of passing information to the enemy.

Mi'ilya became a local council in 1957. It was connected to the national electricity network in 1962. Mi'ilya remained under martial law until 1966.

== Demographics ==
In 2022, 99.8% of the population was Christian, 0.1% was Druze and 0.1% was Muslim.

== Voting Patterns ==
In the 2026 election, 73 percent of voters in Mi'ilya voted for the Arab parties, while 25 percent voted for the parties of the center-left coalition led by Gadi Eisenkot and 1 percent voted for the parties of the right-wing coalition led by Benjamin Netanyahu. Among the voters for the Arab parties, 93 percent voted for the Joint List, while 7 percent voted for Ra'am. Voter turnout increased 27 percent from the 2022 election.

== Transportation ==
Mi'ilya is located on Highway 89 which connects Nahariya with Elifelet via Safed.

== Church of St Mary Magdalen ==
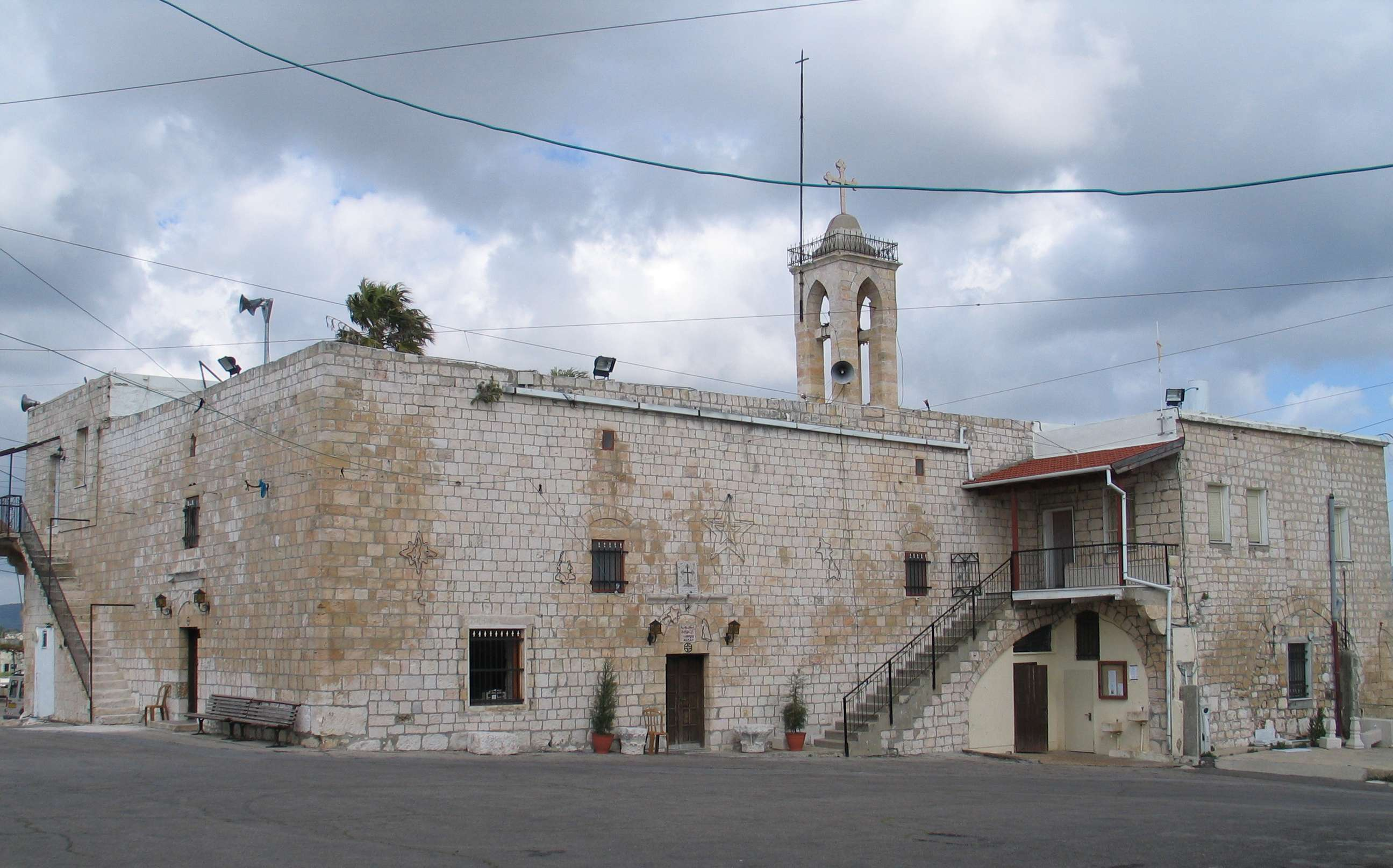
Mi'ilya church

Giovanni Mariti passed by in 1761, and noted "an ancient church, in which the Catholic Greeks perform divine service."

Victor Guérin visited in 1875, and noted that "The Greeks had just rebuilt their church on the foundations of another much more ancient, which was decorated with monolithic columns with capitals imitating Corinthian columns.“

== See also ==
- Arab localities in Israel
- Arab Christians
- Archaeology of Israel

== Bibliography ==
- Abu-‘Uqsa, Hanaa (2005-06-23). "Mi'ilya Final Report". Hadashot Arkheologiyot – Excavations and Surveys in Israel (117).
- Barron, J.B., ed. (1923). Palestine: Report and General Abstracts of the Census of 1922. Government of Palestine.
- Conder, C.R.; Kitchener, H.H. (1881). The Survey of Western Palestine: Memoirs of the Topography, Orography, Hydrography, and Archaeology. Vol. 1. London: Committee of the Palestine Exploration Fund.
- Dauphin, C. (1998). La Palestine byzantine, Peuplement et Populations. BAR International Series 726 (in French). Vol. III : Catalogue. Oxford: Archeopress. ISBN 0-860549-05-4. (P. 634)
- Department of Statistics (1945). Village Statistics, April, 1945. Government of Palestine.
- Ellenblum, R. (2003). Frankish Rural Settlement in the Latin Kingdom of Jerusalem. Cambridge University Press. ISBN 9780521521871.
- Guérin, V. (1880). Description Géographique Historique et Archéologique de la Palestine (in French). Vol. 3: Galilee, pt. 2. Paris: L'Imprimerie Nationale.
- Hadawi, S. (1970). Village Statistics of 1945: A Classification of Land and Area ownership in Palestine. Palestine Liberation Organization Research Center.
- Hütteroth, W.-D.; Abdulfattah, K. (1977). Historical Geography of Palestine, Transjordan and Southern Syria in the Late 16th Century. Erlanger Geographische Arbeiten, Sonderband 5. Erlangen, Germany: Vorstand der Fränkischen Geographischen Gesellschaft. ISBN 3-920405-41-2.
- Khamisy, Rabei G. (2013-11-21). "Mi'ilya". Hadashot Arkheologiyot – Excavations and Surveys in Israel (125).
- Khamisy, Rabei G. (November 2018). "The ʿAssāf family of Miʿilya: An Example of a Greek Catholic Family in the Western Upper Galilee, Eighteenth-Twenty-First Centuries". Middle Eastern Studies. 54 (6): 917–935.
- Le Strange, G. (1890). Palestine Under the Moslems: A Description of Syria and the Holy Land from A.D. 650 to 1500. London: Committee of the Palestine Exploration Fund.
- Mariti, G. (1792). Travels Through Cyprus, Syria, and Palestine; with a General History of the Levant. Vol. 1. Dublin: P. Byrne.
- Mills, E., ed. (1932). Census of Palestine 1931. Population of Villages, Towns and Administrative Areas. Jerusalem: Government of Palestine.
- Morris, B. (1987). The Birth of the Palestinian refugee problem, 1947-1949. Cambridge University Press. ISBN 0-521-33028-9.
- Palmer, E.H. (1881). The Survey of Western Palestine: Arabic and English Name Lists Collected During the Survey by Lieutenants Conder and Kitchener, R. E. Transliterated and Explained by E.H. Palmer. Committee of the Palestine Exploration Fund.
- Porat, Leea (2009-03-09). "Mi'ilya, the Church Square Preliminary Report". Hadashot Arkheologiyot – Excavations and Surveys in Israel (121).
- Pringle, D. (1993). The Churches of the Crusader Kingdom of Jerusalem: A-K (excluding Acre and Jerusalem). Vol. I. Cambridge University Press. ISBN 0-521-39036-2.
- Pringle, D. (1997). Secular buildings in the Crusader Kingdom of Jerusalem: an archaeological Gazetteer. Cambridge University Press. ISBN 0521-46010-7.
- Pringle, D. (1998). The Churches of the Crusader Kingdom of Jerusalem: L-Z (excluding Tyre). Vol. 2. Cambridge University Press. ISBN 0-521-39037-0.
- Rhode, H. (1979). Administration and Population of the Sancak of Safed in the Sixteenth Century (PhD thesis). Columbia University.
- Robinson, E.; Smith, E. (1841). Biblical Researches in Palestine, Mount Sinai and Arabia Petraea: A Journal of Travels in the year 1838. Vol. 3. Boston: Crocker & Brewster.
- Röhricht, R. (1893). (RRH) Regesta regni Hierosolymitani (MXCVII-MCCXCI) (in Latin). Berlin: Libraria Academica Wageriana.
- Schumacher, G. (1888). "Population list of the Liwa of Akka". Quarterly Statement - Palestine Exploration Fund. 20: 169–191.
- Smithline, Howard (2008-12-17). "Mi'iliya Final Report". Hadashot Arkheologiyot – Excavations and Surveys in Israel (120).
- Stern, Edna J. (2012). "Mi'ilya: Evidence of an early Crusader Settlement". 'Atiqot. 70: 63–76.
- Strehlke, E., ed. (1869). Tabulae Ordinis Theutonici ex tabularii regii Berolinensis codice potissimum. Berlin: Weidmanns.
