= Ma'alot-Tarshiha =

Ma'alot-Tarshiha מעלות-תרשיחא (Hebrew) معالوت ترشيحا (Arabic)
- City

Hebrew transcription(s)
  - ISO 259: Maˁlot Taršiḥaˀ
  - Translit.: Maʻalot-Tarshiḥa
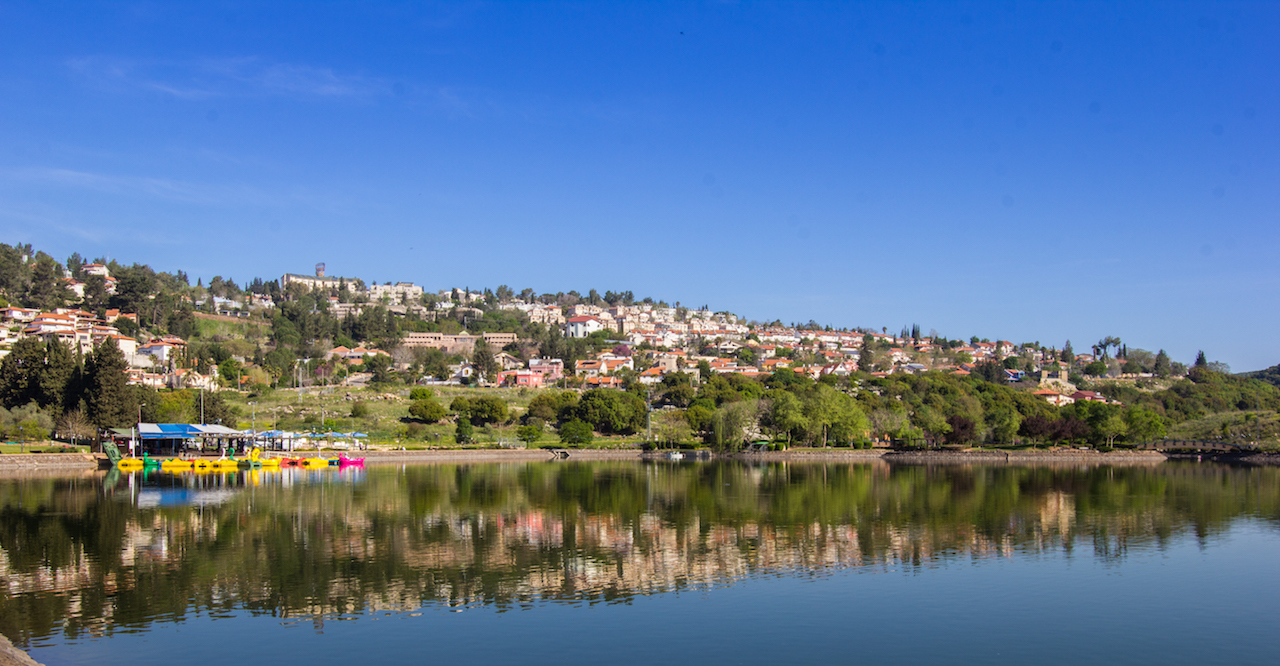
- View of Ma'alot-Tarshiha

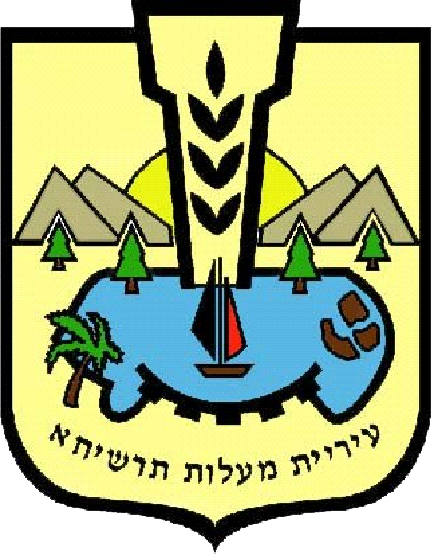
- Coat of arms

- Location within Northwest Israel Location within Israel
- Coordinates: 33°1′0″N 35°16′15″E
- Grid position: 175/268 PAL
- Country: Israel
- District: Northern
- Subdistrict: Acre
- Natural Region: Yehi'am
- Founded: 12th century

Government
  - Type: Mayor–council
  - Body: Municipality of Ma'alot-Tarshiha
  - Mayor: Moti Ben David

Area
  - Total: 9,220 dunams (9.22 km^{2}; 3.56 sq mi)

Population (2024)
  - Total: 23,042
  - Density: 2,500/km^{2} (6,470/sq mi)

Ethnicity
  - Jews and others: 77.4%
  - Arabs: 22.6%
- Name meaning: Teir Shiha: Teir, a fortress. Shih is a fragrant herb.
- Website: maltar.org.il

Ma'alot-Tarshiha (Hebrew: מעלות-תרשיחא; Arabic: معالوت ترشيحا) is a city in the Northern District in Israel, about 20 kilometres (12 miles) east of Nahariya, and about 600 metres (1,969 feet) above sea level. The city was established in 1963 through a municipal merger of the Arab town of Tarshiha and the Jewish town of Ma'alot, creating a unique type of mixed city. In 2024, it had a population of 23,042.

== History ==
=== Tarshiha ===
Excavations of a 4th-century burial cave in the village unearthed a cross and a piece of glass engraved with a menorah.

Crusader sources from the 12th and 13th century refer to Tarshiha as Terschia, Torsia, and Tersigha. The King had initiated the settlement of Crusader (Latin, Frankish) people in nearby Mi'ilya ("Castellum Regis"), and from there settlement spread out to Tarshiha. In 1160, Torsia and several surrounding villages were transferred to a Crusader named Iohanni de Caypha (Johannes of Haifa). By 1217, the village was probably inhabited by Crusader ("Frankish") people. In 1220 Joscelin III´s daughter Beatrix de Courtenay and her husband Otto von Botenlauben, Count of Henneberg, sold their land, including Tersyha, to the Teutonic Knights. In 1266, Tarshiha was raided by Crusader troops.

According to popular Arabic etymology, the name may have meant "Artemisia Mountain" in the Canaanite language, where Arabic ṭūr for "mountain" and shīḥ for Artemisia vulgaris (mugwort, or common wormwood) could be identified. E. H. Palmer (1881) explains the name as Teir meaning "a fortress", and Shīḥ, "a fragrant herb".

==== Ottoman era ====
Incorporated into the Ottoman Empire in 1517 with the rest of Palestine, the village of Tarshiha was raided by the Lebanese feudal chief, Mansur ibn Furaykh in 1573. The daftar of 1596 show the village to be under the administration of the nahiye of Akka, with a population of 107 households ("khana") and 3 bachelors, all Muslim. The inhabitants paid taxes on "occasional revenues", bees and goats. The village was also taxed for a press, used either of olives or for grapes. Total revenue was 17,660 akçe.

In the early 18th century, the village was under control of Sheikh Husayn who was based in the Jiddin fortress, while later in the Ottoman period it became one of the major cotton-producing villages of Galilee, and the administrative center of the nahiya. Mariti visited the village (which he called Terschia) in 1761, and wrote that it "abounds with water; which adds greatly to the fertility of its cotton plants, its fruit-trees, and above all its tobacco".

In the early 19th century (pre-1859), William McClure Thomson visited the village, which was still a subdistrict center, and noted its residents numbered about 3,000, the majority Muslims and one-fifth Christians. He opined that Tarshiha's Muslim inhabitants were "uncommonly profane, boorish and insolent" but their manners had improved from the past due to the influence of its resident reformist sheikh, Ali al-Maghrebi ('Aly el Mughraby'), who preached a "sort of Moslem Protestantism" and promoted charity and respect for Christians. Victor Guérin, who visited in 1875, found that Tarshiha "consists of four quarters, under the jurisdiction of as many different sheikhs. There are 2,000 Moslems, who have their mosques. The Christians occupy their own quarters: with the exception of a few families they are all Uniate Melkite Greeks, and number about 500."

In 1881 the Palestine Exploration Fund's Survey of Western Palestine described Tarshiha as: "a very large village, containing about 1,500 Moslems and 300 Christians; there is a fine mosque with minarets newly built, also an old one; the houses are well-built; a new and handsome church has been built in the Christian quarter". In 1883, Laurence Oliphant visited and wrote that Tershicha was home to around 2,000 people, most of whom were followers of Ali Al-Mughrabi, an Islamic sheikh and reformer who immigrated from North Africa. A population list from about 1887 showed Tarshiha to have about 4,855 inhabitants; 4,000 Muslims and 855 Christian.

==== British Mandate era ====
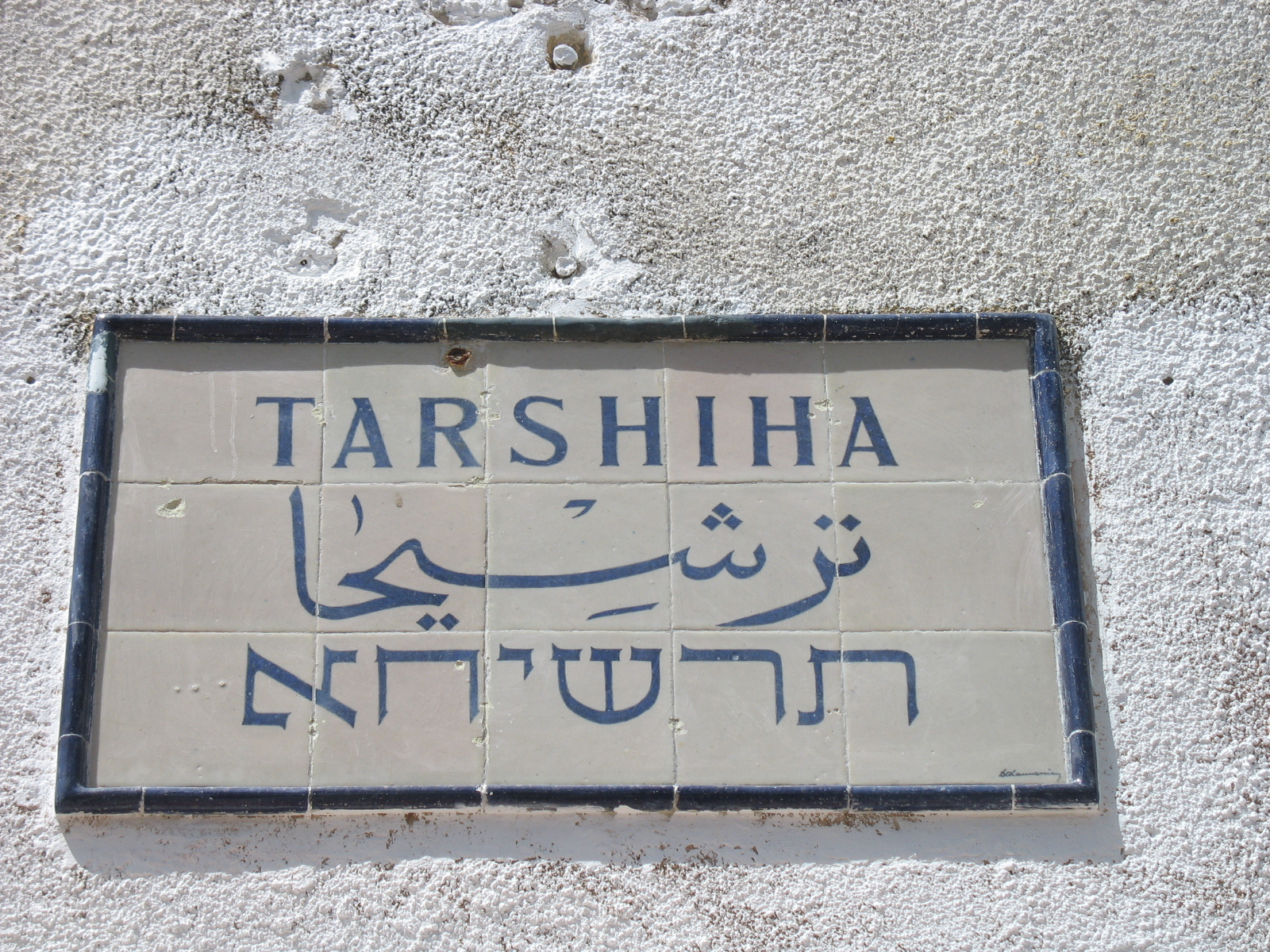
Tarshiha sign on Mandatory police station

In the 1922 census of Palestine conducted by the British Mandate authorities, Tarsheha had a population of 1,880 residents; 1,521 Muslims, 358 Christians and 1 Druze, where the Christians were 298 Melkite, 53 Orthodox and 7 Church of England. The population had increased in the 1931 census to a total of 2522; 2047 Muslims and 475 Christians, in a total of 584 houses.

In the 1945 statistics the population of Tarshiha was 3,840; 3140 Muslims and 690 Christians. The total population of Tarshiha combined with Al-Kabri was 5,360 Arabs, with 47,428 dunams of land. Of this, a total of 743 dunums of land in the two places was used for citrus and bananas, 5,301 were plantation and irrigable land, 14,123 for cereals, while 252 dunams were built-up (urban) land.

Residents of Ma'alot-Tarshiha interviewed in early 1980s recalled Tarshiha as being the leading village in the area with a population of 3,000 including 700 Christians. The Christians had established a successful handcrafts industry. The villages main crop was tobacco. There was a tobacco growers union which ran a trucking cooperative. In the mid-1930s it was learnt that the Sursock family were going to sell land in the Jaqtoun valley. A delegation from the village travelled to Beirut and was able to buy the land. After clearing and draining it was divided into plots which were distributed by lottery to the participating families. Tarshiha was the first Palestinian village to establish a development fund by collecting £1 a year from each adult male resident.

Tarshiha played a role in the Syrian campaign or operation Exporter during World War II, which was the invasion of the Allies of the Grand Syria (currently Syria and Lebanon), at the time controlled by the Vichy government, between June and July 1941 when the region of Grand Syria served as a base for supporting the Nazis during the Anglo-Iraqi War. On the day of the liberation of Tyre, 8 June 1941, the advance of the Australians "took place from the ground early in the morning on Sunday. The main push was in the direction of Tarshiha from the north. It started at 6 in the morning and Tyre was occupied at 16.30."

==== 1948 Palestine war ====
Tarshiha was in the territory allotted to the Palestinians under the 1947 UN Partition Plan.

Following the establishment of the state of Israel Tarshiha was surrounded on three sides by the Israeli army and the border with Lebanon to the North. Tarshiha and sixteen smaller villages established a regional committee which organised the reopening of schools, regulated imports from Lebanon as well as attending to security and defence.

In the 1948 Arab-Israeli War, Tarshiha was attacked by the newly formed Israel Defense Forces (IDF) during Operation Hiram. Three Israeli planes bombed Tarshiha on the evening of 29 October, killing at least 24 and causing a flight of the population, forming a part of the broader 1948 Palestinian expulsion and flight. (Note: Morris 2004 "The bombing of Tarshiha that night killed 24 and buried 60 more under rubble, and triggered mass flight.") This was followed by a prolonged artillery barrage and a further air raid the following morning. The village defenders and most of the inhabitants retreated north into Lebanon. By the end of the day the IDF had captured the town. A UN observer reported that on 1 November 1948 the Arab villages around Tarshiha were deserted and extensively looted by Israeli forces. The New York Times added that the looting appeared systematic, as Israeli army trucks were used carrying off the looted goods.

By December 1948 around 700 villagers, mostly Christians, had returned to the village. Families from Tarshiha began arriving in Beirut shortly after the conquest of the village and lived in rented rooms around Bourj el Barajneh which at that time was a suburb on the fringe of the city. About half of the 3,000 villagers arriving in Lebanon settled there in what became Bourj al Barajneh refugee camp. They took on most of the leadership roles and remained the majority population for many years. In 1981 it was estimated 4–5,000 Tarshihans were living in the camp. Those villagers who were unable to reach Beirut in 1948 were rounded up and sent by train to Aleppo were they became the largest group in al-Neirab Camp.

Any Arab who had not registered, as of November 1948, was regarded as illegal and if caught deported. An American Quaker relief worker with the American Friends Service Committee described a raid on Tarshiha on 15 January 1949. All males over sixteen were questioned by a panel of eight Israelis. 33 heads of families and 101 family members, aged 1 year to 79 years, were selected for deportation. They were robbed and expelled via 'Ara to Jenin. A UN observer in Jenin reported that their homes were being re-populated by large numbers of Jewish refugees from Austria.

=== State of Israel ===
The abandoned houses in Tarshiha were initially taken over by Jews from Romania. When they were moved on to new settlements the houses were demolished. Around 600 villagers remained after 1948. They were joined by others expelled from nine other local villages. In December 1949 the Israeli Foreign Ministry blocked an IDF plan to clear Tarshiha and five other villages along the Lebanon border of their remaining Arab populations to create an 5 to 10 kilometres (3 to 6 miles) Arab-free zone. Arabs in the Galilee remained under Martial Law until 1966.

==== Ma'alot-Tarshiha merger ====
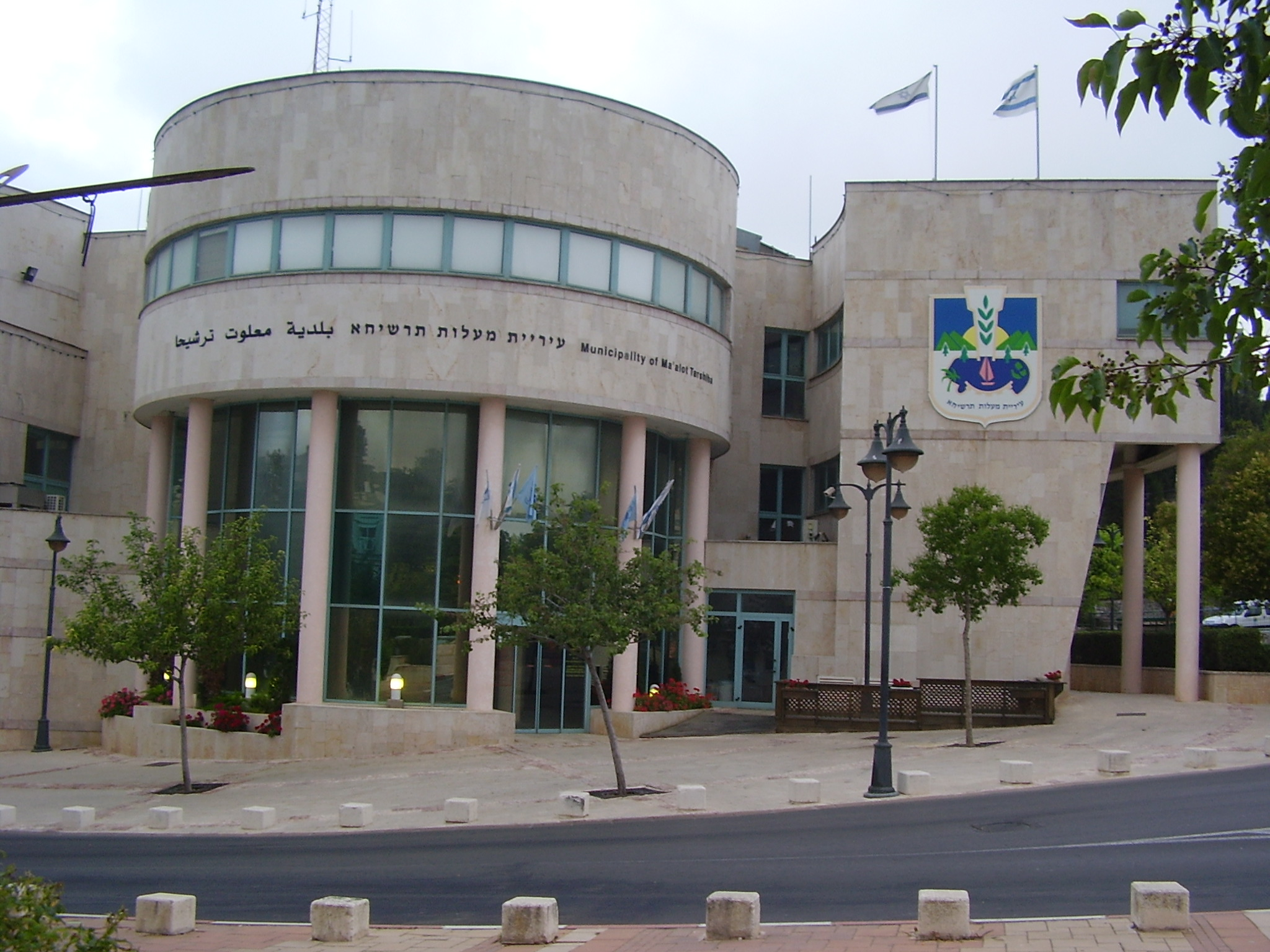
Ma'alot-Tarshiha City Hall

In 1963, Tarshiha was merged with Ma'alot, a development town for Jewish immigrants from Romania, Iran and Morocco, established in 1957.

On 15 May 1974, an elementary school in Ma'alot was attacked by terrorists of the Democratic Front for the Liberation of Palestine in what became known as the Ma'alot massacre. Twenty-two teenagers and three teachers from Safed on a class trip were murdered in the attack. They had been sleeping on the floor inside the building. In addition, three Israeli women, one of them seven months pregnant, one four-year-old child, and two men were killed by the same terrorists in the events before the murder of the school children.

A visitor in 1980 estimated that half of the 2,400 Arabs living in the town originated from Tarshiha. 70% of those with jobs worked in the building trade, none of them were farmers. The 3,500 Jewish residents were mostly Moroccan. Few of whom stayed for long periods. During the 1990s post-Soviet aliyah in the 1990s, many immigrants settled in the city. Ma'alot-Tarshiha was officially recognized as a city in 1996.

Nearly 700 Katyusha rockets landed in the vicinity of Ma'alot-Tarshiha during the Second Lebanon War. Three Arab residents of the city were killed in a rocket attack.

== Demographics ==
Historical population
| Year | Pop. | ±% |
|---|---|---|
| 1972 | 5,100 | — |
| 1983 | 7,800 | +52.9% |
| 1995 | 15,800 | +102.6% |
| 2008 | 20,600 | +30.4% |
| 2022 | 22,720 | +10.3% |
| 2024 | 23,042 | +1.4% |

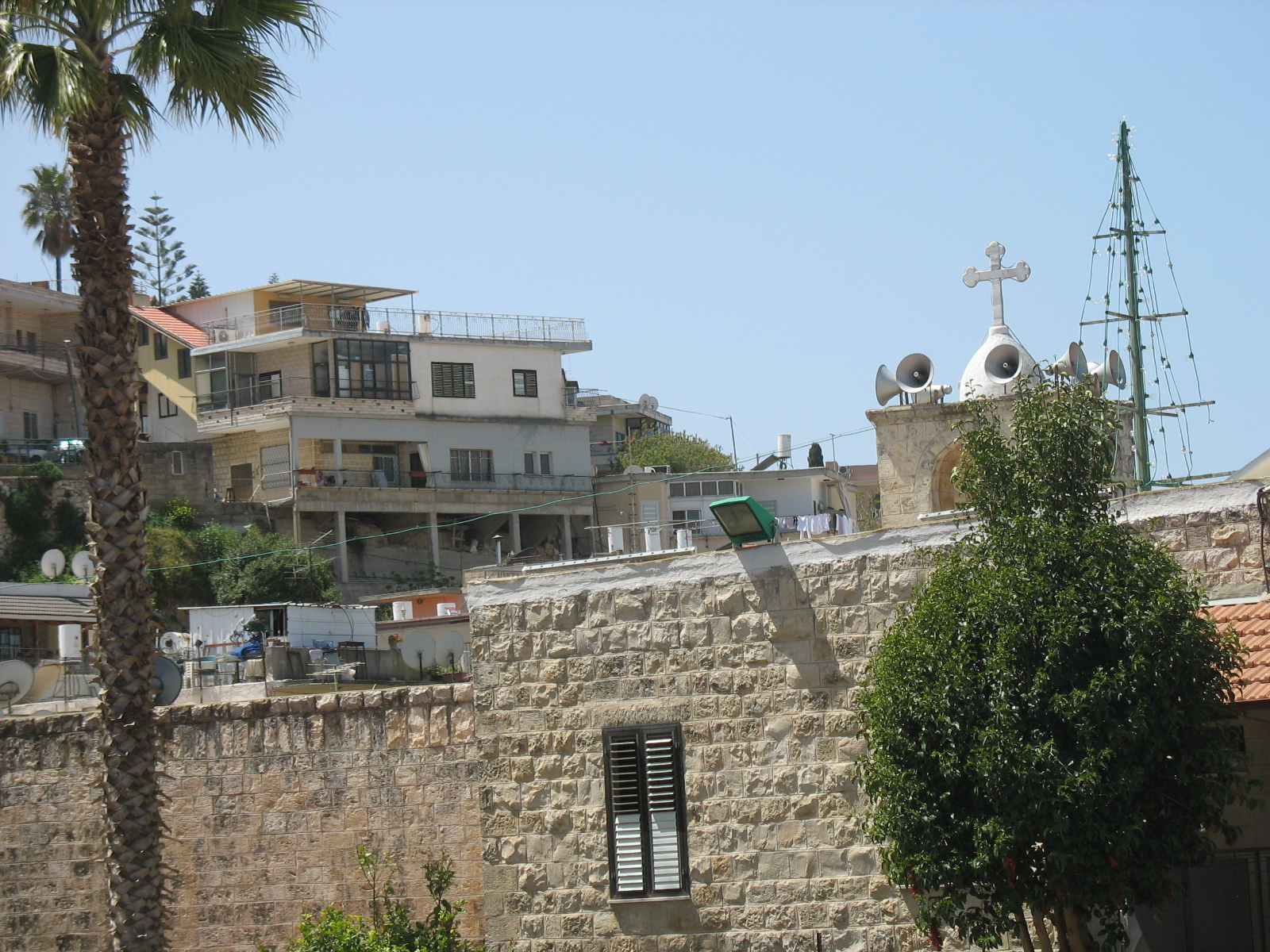
St. George Church, Tarshiha

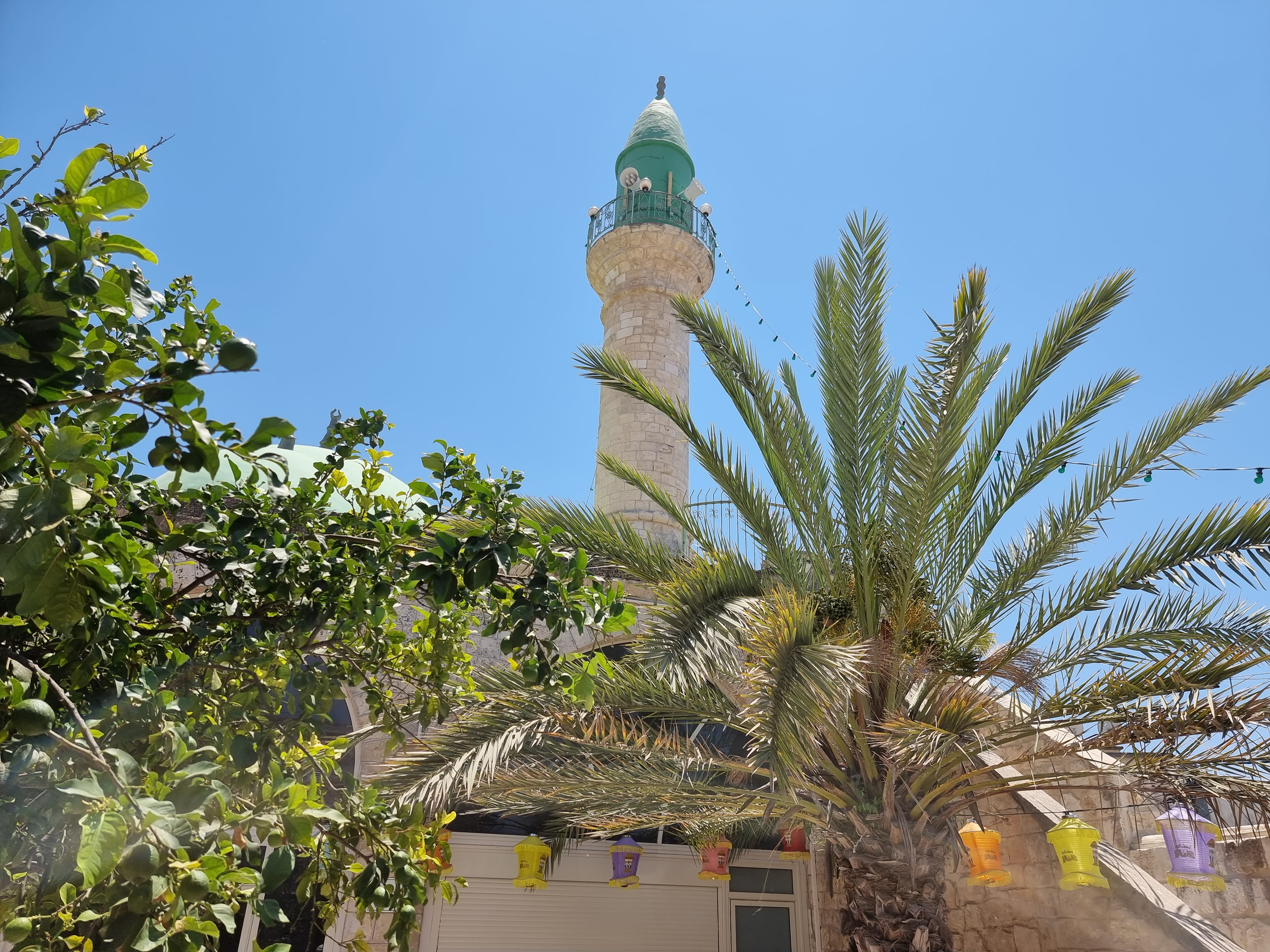
Sheik Abd Allah Pasha Mosque

In 2016, ethnic and religious makeup of the city was 79.2% Jewish and other non-Arabs, and 20.8% Arab (10% Muslim, 9.9% Christian, and 0.3% Druze). In 2016, there were 10,600 males and 10,500 females. The population of the city was diverse in age with 30.8% 19 years of age or younger, 14.2% between 20 and 29, 18.1% between 30 and 44, 18.2% from 45 to 59, 5.5% from 60 to 64, and 13.1% 65 years of age or older. The population growth rate in 2016 was −0.4%.

As of 2016, there were 10,503 salaried workers and 564 self-employed persons in the city. The mean monthly wage in 2016 for a salaried worker was NIS 7,745 (USD 2397.83). Salaried men had a mean monthly wage of NIS 9,360 versus NIS 6,005 for women. The average income for the self-employed was NIS 8,929. Some 37% of the working population worked for minimum wage, 269 people received unemployment benefits, and 940 people who received an income guarantee.

Following Israel's withdrawal from Lebanon in 2000 some ex-South Lebanon Army soldiers and officers who fled from Lebanon settled in Ma'alot with their families. In 2022, 64.5% of the population was Jewish, 13.4% was Muslim, 10.8% was Christian, 0.3% was Druze and 11.1% was counted as other.

== Economy ==
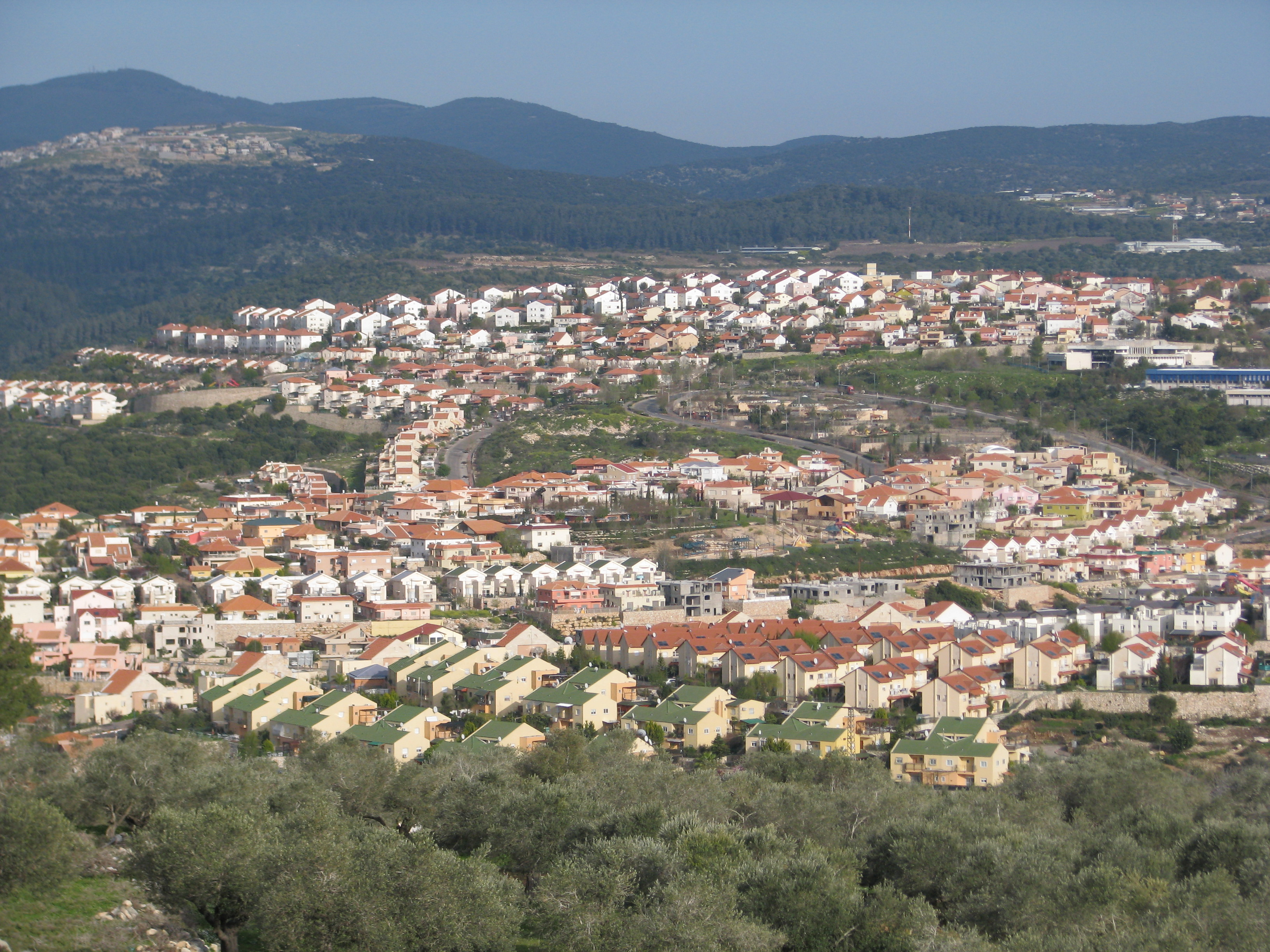
View of Ma'alot

The Tefen Industrial Zone, which includes famous companies such as the Iscar plant was built in the vicinity of Ma'alot-Tarshiha by Stef Wertheimer and is major source of employment for the city's residents. In 2007, the jobless rate in Ma’alot-Tarshiha was 5.5 percent, compared to 7.9 percent nationally.

== Education ==
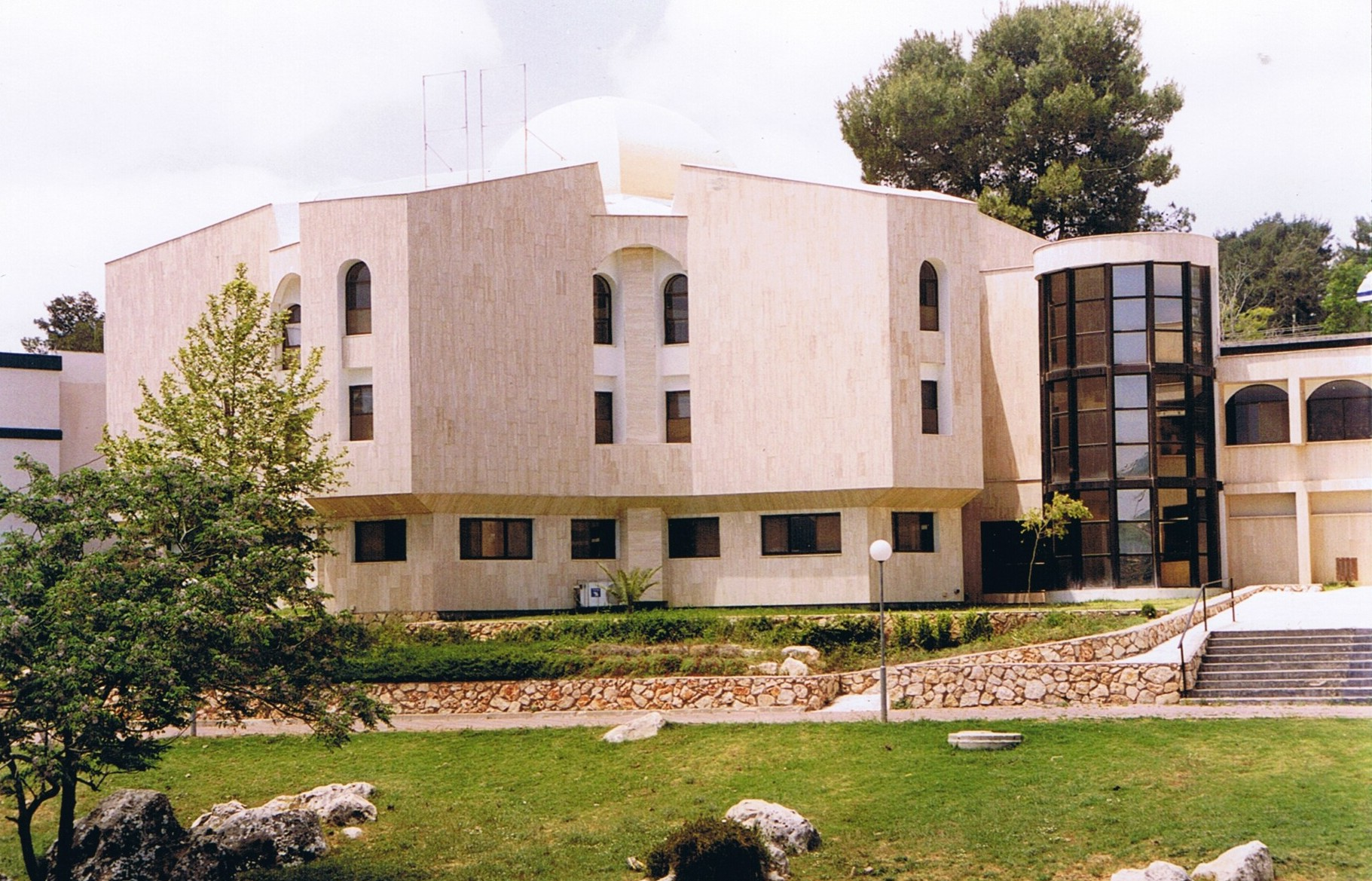
Yeshivat Ma'alot

In 2001, there were 11 schools and 4,272 students in the city, including 7 elementary schools with an enrollment of 2,000, and 7 high schools with 2,272 students. 58.5% of the city's 12th graders earned a matriculation certificate in 2001. In August 1975, Yeshivat Ma'alot, a Hesder yeshiva, was established, attracting students from all over the world. In recent years the Yeshiva has estimated 300 students per year. There is nine schools in Maalot Tarshiha. Three elementary schools, two datish schools, two Talmud Torah schools, one middle school, and one high school. The middle school and the high school are jointed.

== Landmarks and culture ==
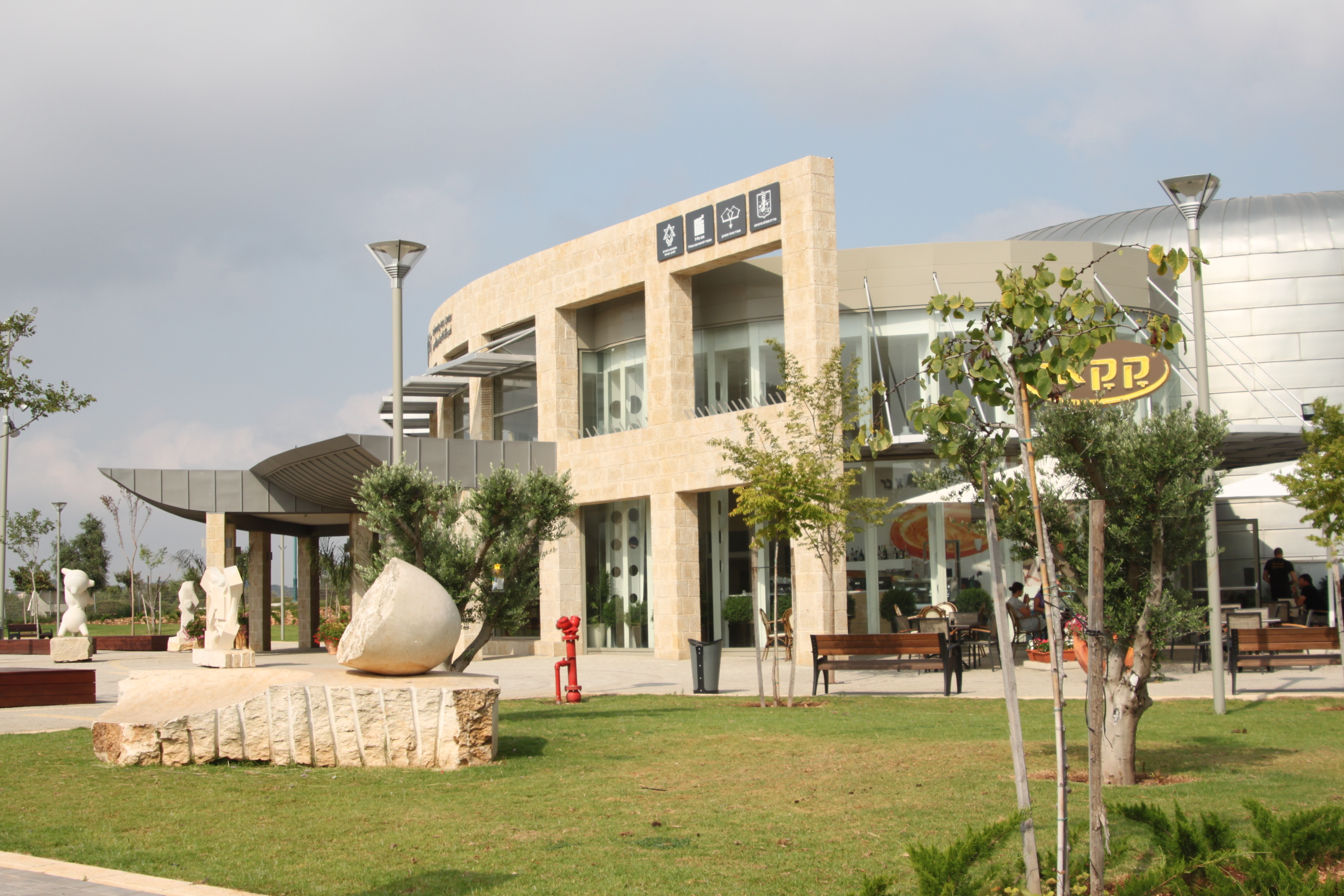
Performing arts center, Ma'alot

Victor Guérin, after his 1875 visit, wrote that the principal mosque in Tarshiha had been built by Abdullah Pasha, (the Governor of Acre at the time.) He further noted that it was "preceded by a court, then by a porch; surmounted by a cupola, above which springs an elegant minaret." Andrew Petersen, who inspected the mosque in 1993, noted that it was built in "classical Ottoman style with four main elements: a courtyard, an arcade, a domed prayer hall, and a minaret."

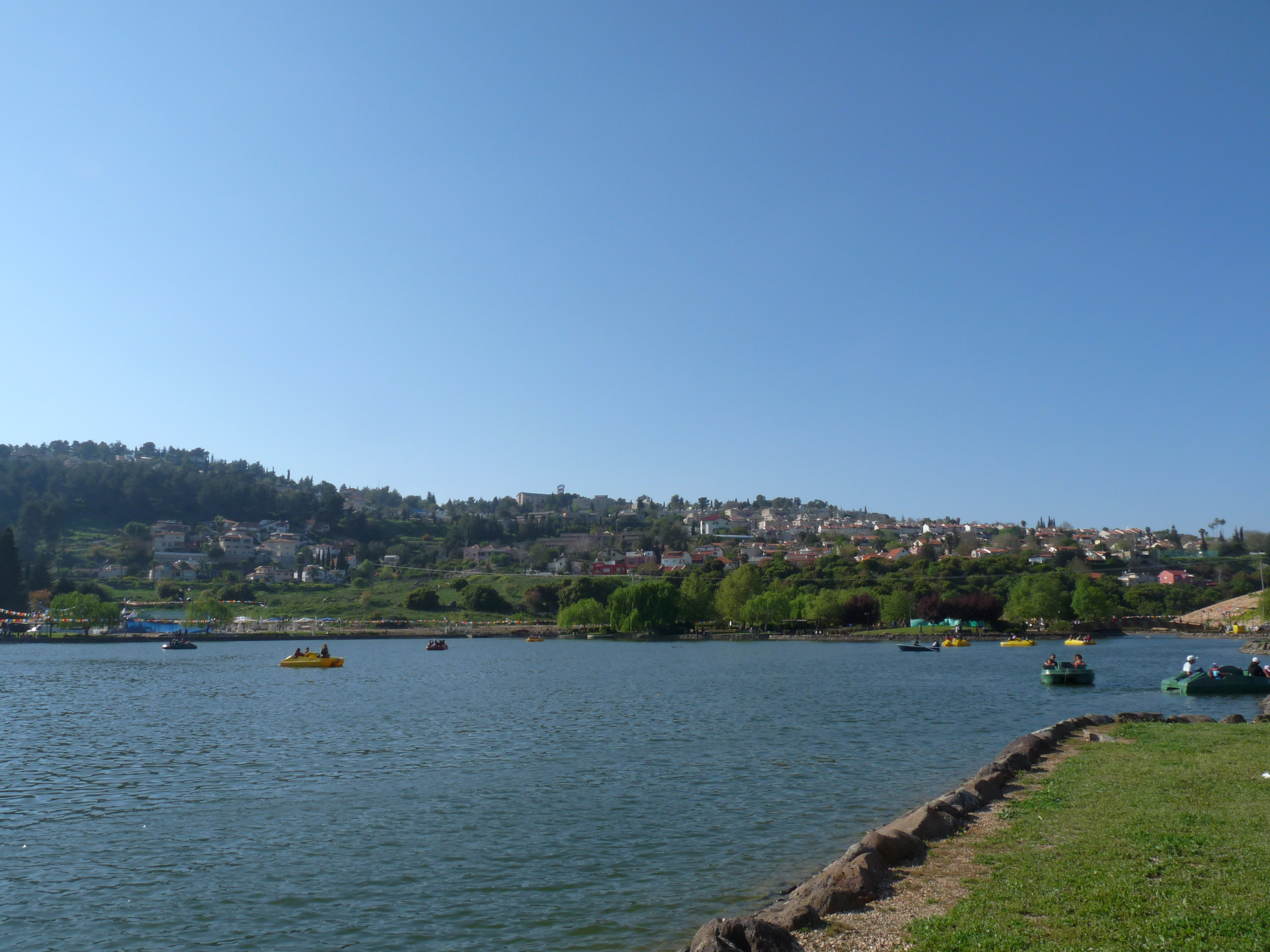
Monfort Lake, Ma'alot

Lake Monfort, an artificial lake to the east of Ma'alot-Tarshiha, has become a local tourist attraction. It was previously known as the Hosen Reservoir. The lake is featured in the city's emblem.

In January 2008, Ma'alot-Tarshiha hosted the Israel International Chess Championship. The tournament, held at the community center, carried a prize of $20,000. The city has also hosted other international events, among them an international fencing tournament. The "Stone in the Galilee" International Sculpture Symposium has been held annually in Ma'alot-Tarshiha since 1991. In this 10-day springtime event, sculptors from Israel and around the world convene at Montfort Lake to create stone sculptures from huge blocks of stone.

In 2009, the non-profit Docaviv established an annual documentary film festival in the city in an effort to bring "high quality cultural activity to the Israeli periphery."

== Voting patterns ==
In the 2022 election, 45 percent of voters in Ma'alot-Tarshiha voted for the parties of the right-wing coalition led by Benjamin Netanyahu, while 30 percent voted for the parties of the center-left coalition led by Yair Lapid and 22 percent voted for the Arab parties.

In the 2026 election, 42 percent of voters in Ma'alot-Tarshiha voted for the parties of the right-wing coalition led by Benjamin Netanyahu, while 29 percent voted for the parties of the center-left coalition led by Gadi Eisenkot and 24 percent voted for the Arab parties. An additional 2.3 percent voted for the Reservists, and 1.4 percent voted for Amcha Yisrael. Voter turnout increased 20 percent from the 2022 election.

== Notable people ==
- Ashraf Barhom (born 1979), actor
- Amal Bishara, doctor, and the director of Bone Marrow Registry Outreach in Hadassah Medical Center
- Nisreen Faour (born 1972), actress
- Mahmoud Hawari (born 1953), archaeologist and academic
- Jake Marlowe (1997–2023), British-Israeli musician, killed in the Nova music festival massacre
- Simon Shaheen (born 1955), musician and composer

== Twin towns – sister cities ==
Ma'alot-Tarshiha is twinned with:

- Birobidzhan, Russia
- Harrisburg, Pennsylvania, United States
- Asti, Italy
- Reichenbach im Vogtland, Germany
- Perpignan, France
- Quba, Azerbaijan
- (Czech Republic) Český Krumlov, Czechia

== Bibliography ==
- Barron, J.B., ed. (1923). Palestine: Report and General Abstracts of the Census of 1922. Government of Palestine.
- Cohen, A. (1973), Palestine in the Eighteenth Century: Patterns of Government and Administration, Hebrew University, Jerusalem. Cited in Petersen, (2001)
- Conder, C.R.; Kitchener, H.H. (1881). The Survey of Western Palestine: Memoirs of the Topography, Orography, Hydrography, and Archaeology. Vol. 1. London: Committee of the Palestine Exploration Fund.
- Department of Statistics (1945). Village Statistics, April, 1945. Government of Palestine.
- Ellenblum, R. (2003). Frankish Rural Settlement in the Latin Kingdom of Jerusalem. Cambridge University Press. ISBN 9780521521871.
- Frankel, Rafael (1988). "Topographical notes on the territory of Acre in the Crusader period". Israel Exploration Journal. 38 (4): 249–272.
- Guérin, V. (1880). Description Géographique Historique et Archéologique de la Palestine (in French). Vol. 3: Galilee, pt. 2. Paris: L'Imprimerie Nationale.
- Hadawi, S. (1970). Village Statistics of 1945: A Classification of Land and Area ownership in Palestine. Palestine Liberation Organization Research Center.
- Hütteroth, W.-D.; Abdulfattah, K. (1977). Historical Geography of Palestine, Transjordan and Southern Syria in the Late 16th Century. Erlanger Geographische Arbeiten, Sonderband 5. Erlangen, Germany: Vorstand der Fränkischen Geographischen Gesellschaft. ISBN 3-920405-41-2.
- Khalidi, W. (1992). All That Remains:The Palestinian Villages Occupied and Depopulated by Israel in 1948. Washington D.C.: Institute for Palestine Studies. ISBN 0-88728-224-5.
- Mariti, G. (1792). Travels Through Cyprus, Syria, and Palestine; with a General History of the Levant. Vol. 1. Dublin: P. Byrne.
- Mills, E., ed. (1932). Census of Palestine 1931. Population of Villages, Towns and Administrative Areas. Jerusalem: Government of Palestine.
- Morris, B. (1993). Israel's Border Wars, 1949 – 1956. Arab Infiltration, Israeli Retaliation, and the Countdown to the Suez War. Oxford University Press. ISBN 0-19-827850-0.
- Morris, B. (1987). The Birth of the Palestinian refugee problem, 1947-1949. Cambridge University Press. ISBN 0-521-33028-9.
- Morris, B. (2004). The Birth of the Palestinian Refugee Problem Revisited. Cambridge University Press. ISBN 978-0-521-00967-6.
- Palmer, E.H. (1881). The Survey of Western Palestine: Arabic and English Name Lists Collected During the Survey by Lieutenants Conder and Kitchener, R. E. Transliterated and Explained by E.H. Palmer. Committee of the Palestine Exploration Fund.
- Petersen, Andrew (2001). A Gazetteer of Buildings in Muslim Palestine (British Academy Monographs in Archaeology). Vol. I. Oxford University Press. ISBN 978-0-19-727011-0. (Tarshiha:293-296)
- Rhode, H. (1979). Administration and Population of the Sancak of Safed in the Sixteenth Century. Columbia University. Archived from the original on 1 March 2020.
- Robinson, E.; Smith, E. (1841). Biblical Researches in Palestine, Mount Sinai and Arabia Petraea: A Journal of Travels in the year 1838. Vol. 3. Boston: Crocker & Brewster. (p. 376)
- Röhricht, R. (1893). (RRH) Regesta regni Hierosolymitani (MXCVII-MCCXCI) (in Latin). Berlin: Libraria Academica Wageriana.
- Shammas, A. (1988), The Retreat from Galilee, Granta 23, Spring 1988. ISBN 014-00-8603-X
- Schumacher, G. (1888). "Population list of the Liwa of Akka". Quarterly Statement – Palestine Exploration Fund. 20: 169–191.
- Strehlke, E., ed. (1869). Tabulae Ordinis Theutonici ex tabularii regii Berolinensis codice potissimum. Berlin: Weidmanns.
- Thomson, William McClure (1882). The Land and the Book: Central Palestine and Phoenicia (Popular ed.). New York: Harper and Brothers.
