= Baram =

Baram may refer to

== Places ==
=== India ===
- Baram, Meerut a village in Meerut district, Uttar Pradesh, India

=== Iran ===
- Baram Seh, a village in Iran

=== Malaysia ===
- Baram Dam, a dam in Malaysia
- Baram District, a district of Sarawak, Malaysia
- Baram (federal constituency), represented in the Dewan Rakyat, Malaysia
- Baram River, a river in Malaysia

== Other ==
- Baram, a name for the Sacred fig
- Baram language, an endangered Newaric (Sino-Tibetan) language spoken in Nepal
- Baramue Nara or simply Baram (바람의 나라), Korean game known in the US as Nexus: The Kingdom of the Winds
- Baram tteok, a Korean dessert

== See also ==
- Bar'am (disambiguation)
- Kfar Bar'am (disambiguation)
