= Kfar Bar'am (disambiguation) =

Bar'am may refer to:

- Kafr Bir'im, a historic village, depopulated in the 1948 Palestinian exodus
  - Kfar Bar'am synagogue (or Kafar Ber'im or Berem synagogue), the ruins of two synagogues from the Talmudic period
- Kibbutz Bar'am, a modern kibbutz in the Upper Galilee, north of the historic village
