= Yosef Shenberger =

Israeli architect (1912–1982)

Yosef Shenberger יוסף שנברגר
- Born: 1912; Frankfurt, Germany
- Died: 13 June 1982 (aged 69–70); Jerusalem
- Other names: Yosef Schenberger
- Occupation: Architect
- Practice: Yosef Shenberger – Tuvia Katz Ltd.
- Buildings: Mayanei Hayeshua Medical Center; Shaare Zedek Medical Center; Kol Torah
- Projects: Kfar Bar'am synagogue; Western Wall Plaza; Cave of the Patriarchs; Tomb of Rabbi Shimon Bar Yochai; Rachel's Tomb

Yosef Shenberger (Hebrew: יוסף שנברגר, also Schenberger; 1912 – 13 June 1982) was an Israeli architect. He designed many public buildings in the newly independent State of Israel including yeshivas, synagogues, hospitals and nursing homes, many of them in Jerusalem. Among his more notable projects are Mayanei Hayeshua Medical Center in Bnei Brak and, along with David Anatol Brutzkus, the new campus of Shaare Zedek Medical Center in Jerusalem. He was involved in the restoration of many ancient ruins and religious sites, including the Kfar Bar'am synagogue, Western Wall Plaza and the Cave of the Patriarchs in Hebron.

== Early life ==
Yosef Shenberger was born in Frankfurt, Germany to Yehuda, a member of the Orthodox Jewish community founded by Samson Raphael Hirsch.

== Career ==
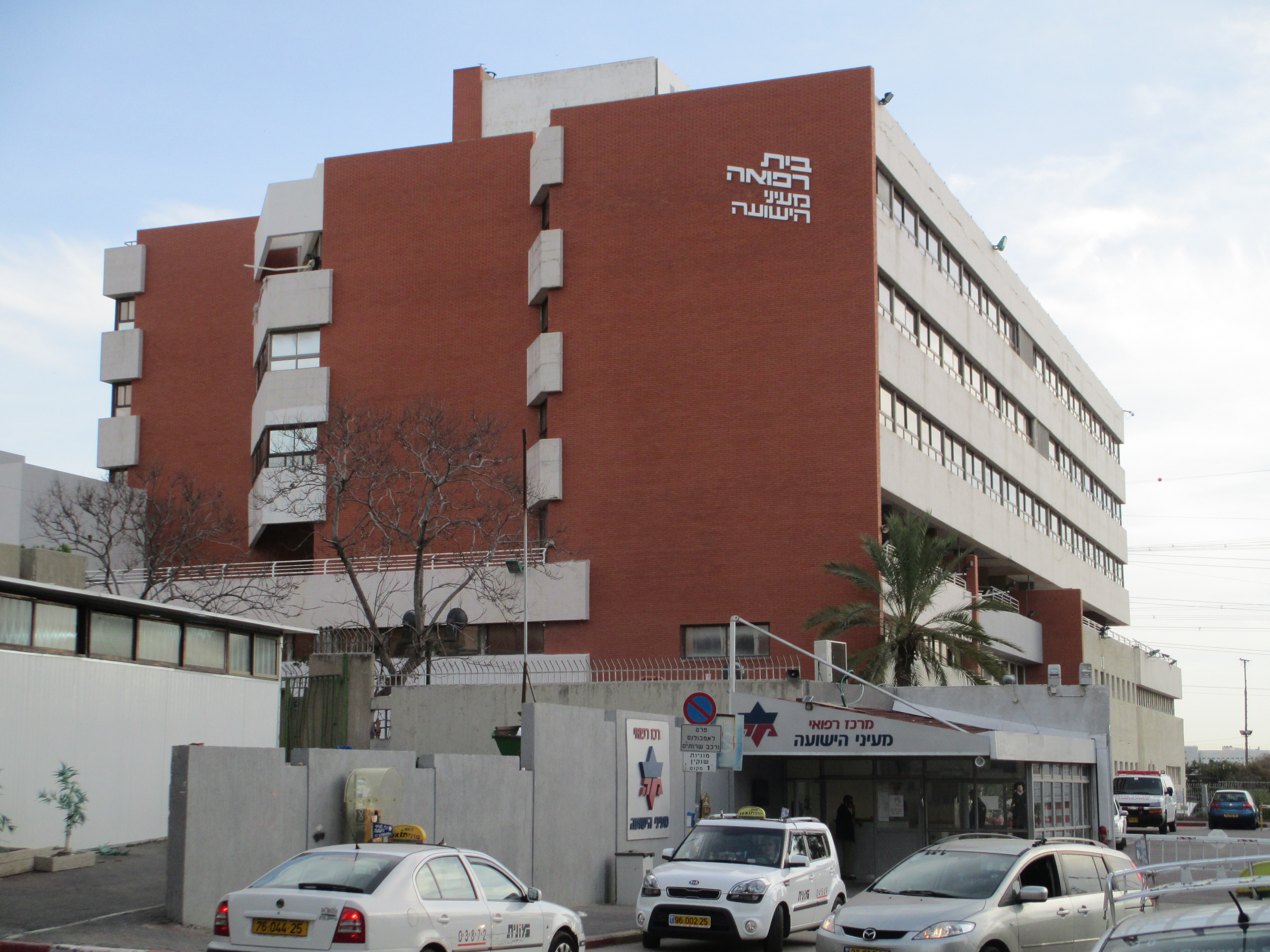
Mayanei Hayeshua Medical Center in Bnei Brak

As a result of Adolf Hitler's rise to power, Shenberger emigrated to Mandatory Palestine in 1935, where he found work as an architect at Ma'atz, the Public Works Department of the Ministry of Transportation, which ultimately became the National Roads Company of Israel. In the 1940s, he designed the dormitory of the Mekor Haim yeshiva, and an industrial complex in Tel Arza on behalf of PAGI (not to be confused with Poalei Agudat Yisrael – PAI) a Haredi workers' organisation.

After the State of Israel was established in 1948, Shenberger served as deputy director of the Jerusalem Development Department at the Jewish Agency. After 1950, he started to work as an independent architect in Jerusalem, and became a member of the Planning and Construction Committee of the Jerusalem Municipality. In 1963, he was a panel member on the committee in charge of the competition to procure a design for the Jerusalem Municipality building. He designed Mayanei Hayeshua Medical Center in Bnei Brak and, along with David Anatol Brutzkus, the new campus of Shaare Zedek Medical Center in Jerusalem.

In 1954, Shenberger was on the panel that was tasked with selecting which exhibits would be shown at an applied arts exhibition in Italy. It was the first time that Israel had been invited to participate in such a venue. In 1959, he was involved in a project to establish sebils (water fountains) for the Arab sector at Abu Ghosh, Tayibe and Meron. At a press conference together with Zev Vilnay that announced the initiative, Shenberger said that he had previously renovated a dilapidated sebil that had been established by Suleiman the Magnificent on Mount Zion.

In 1970, Shenberger took on his friend Tuvia Kätz as a colleague and business partner.

== Synagogues and yeshivas ==
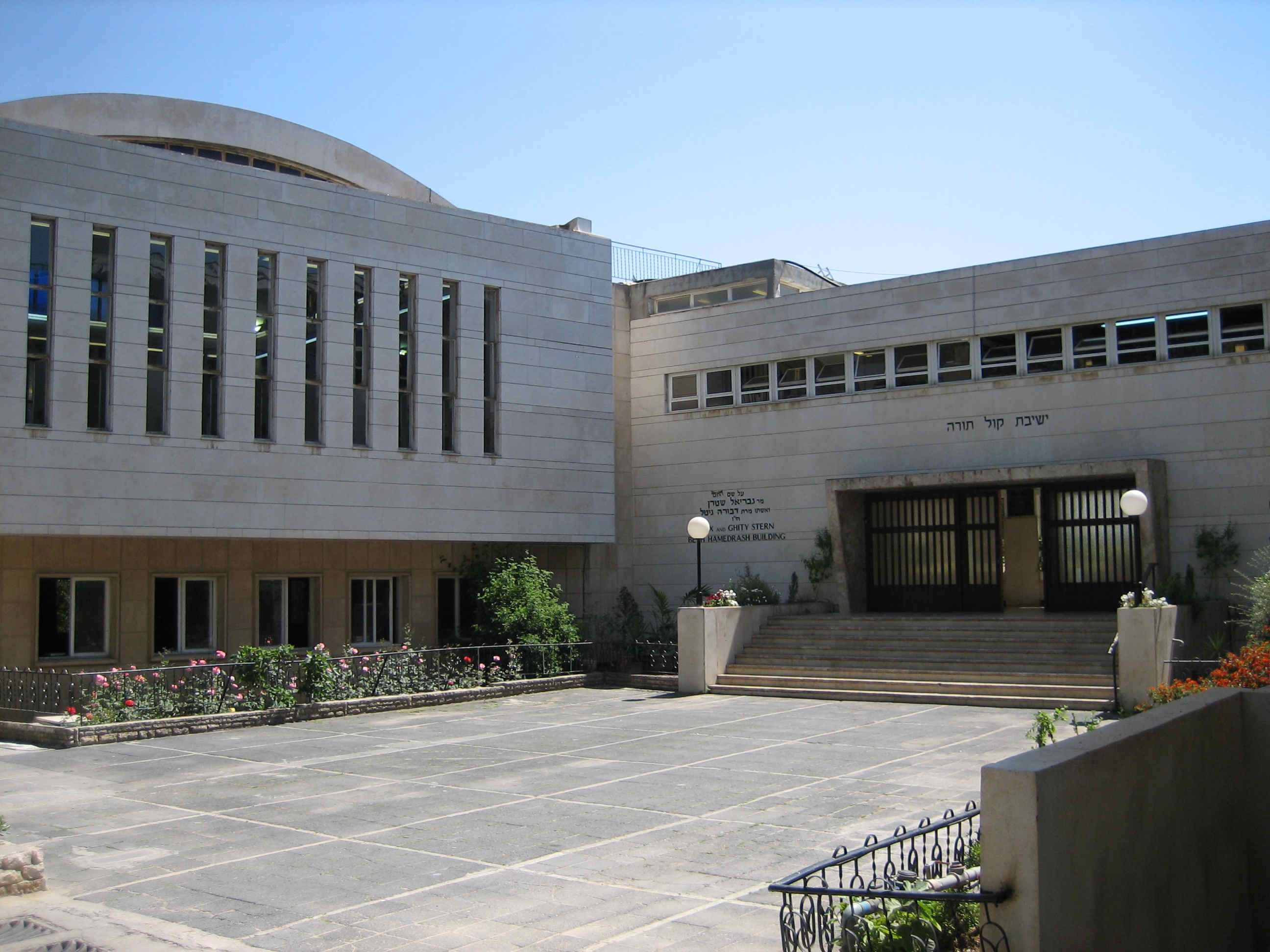
Kol Torah yeshiva in Jerusalem

Shenberger was well-versed in the principles of synagogue building, and designed many of them, including those of Lavi and Shluhot—two religious kibbutzim. The latter was built to the width instead of to the depth, as is more typical, in order to allow the hazzan's voice to reach every congregant. At a symposium held in December 1966 at the Jerusalem branch of the Association of Engineers in Israel, Shenberger advocated for an institute dedicated to the study of synagogues. Deriving inspiration from ancient ruins in Dura-Europos and Kfar Bar'am, he articulated his preference for adding stained glass and other decorative elements to synagogues, in contrast to others who saw these things as distractions for worshipers. He believed that a minimum of 300 square metres was a requirement for the main hall in order to accommodate a congregation comfortably.

Shenberger designed many Israeli yeshivas during the 1960s, including the Tchebin yeshiva (Kokhav MiYaakov) in Tel Arza, Kol Torah in Bayit VeGan, Grodno yeshiva in Ashdod, Ofakim yeshiva and Midreshet Noam seminary in Pardes Hanna. He carried out all of his plans according to the instructions of senior rabbis. Among them were his mentor Shlomo Zalman Auerbach, Yitzchok Zev Soloveitchik, Dov Berish Weidenfeld, Bezalel Zolty and Sholom Noach Berezovsky. As an example of this fealty, when Shenberger wanted to design the Grodno yeshiva as an octagon because the building was situated on a street not in alignment with the direction of prayer to Jerusalem, he first asked Yosef Shlomo Kahaneman whether this was allowed. Later, Kahaneman had a dream wherein he was told to look up the Noda BiYehuda. Upon waking up, he found that this exact scenario was discussed in the book; and while it was technically permitted, it was not advisable, so the progressive idea was scuttled.

According to HaTzofe, Shenberger had connections with Neturei Karta, a Haredi anti-Zionist group.

== Antiquities ==
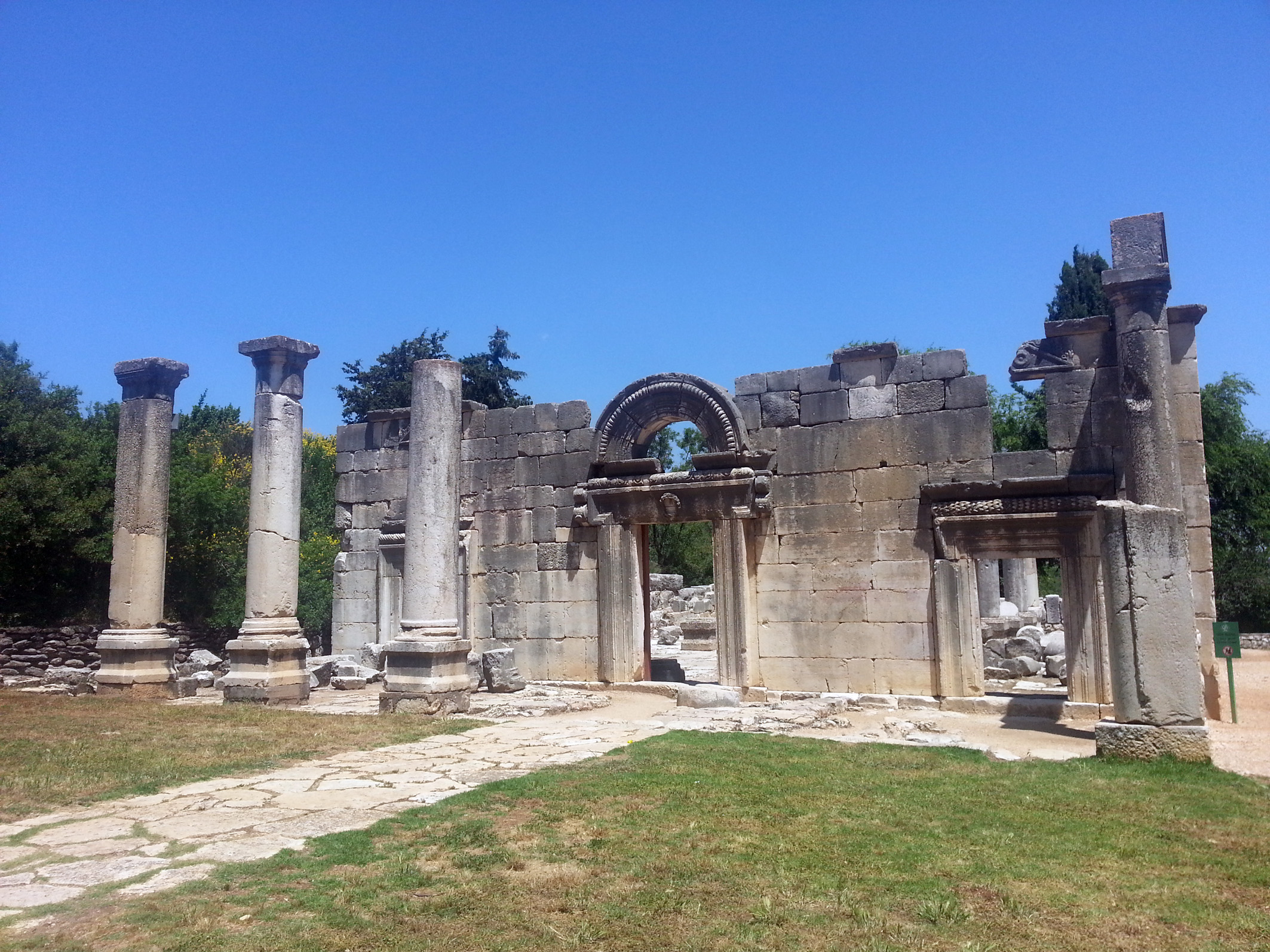
Kfar Bar'am synagogue

Shenberger was deeply interested in the design and artistry of ancient ruins. He was impressed with the frescos and carvings unearthed at the Dura-Europos synagogue. From his restorative work carried out at heritage sites all over Israel, including the Kfar Bar'am synagogue, he noted the ancient builders' usage of decorative elements and local materials, such as mosaics, and integrated some of these ideas into his own plans. In 1956, he won a competition to renovate the tomb of Rabbi Shimon Bar Yochai in Meron.

In 1964, Shenberger's expertise was sought at the Safed cemetery, where the chevra kadisha (burial society) members were having a difficult time reaching the new section due to the sloping terrain. He drafted a plan for an earthen ramp that would straddle the mountain, in this way granting easier access. However, a clerk in the technical department of the mayor's office scuttled the plan in favor of a bridge, under the rationalisation that the ramp would be washed away in the first rain. After work got underway, and after an investment of IL50,000, it was determined that the bridge could not be made wide enough for a pickup truck (12 metres) while still remaining stable. When Shenberger was called back, he declared that the bridge was useless and should be dismantled. Subsequently, he tried to use what he could of the half-completed bridge, with a suggestion that stone arches be looked into as a way to mask the ugly cement pillars used. When the city went ahead and started building the first arch, a very annoyed Shenberger said, "I only made a suggestion that requires intense scrutiny – and you already come and build again on your own?"

After the Six Day War, Shenberger was tasked with planning the grounds of both the Cave of the Patriarchs and Rachel's Tomb. In his capacity as advisor to the Ministry of Religious Affairs, he was the architect in charge of directing the initial planning work on the Western Wall Plaza, supervising the work of Shlomo Aronson and Arthur Kutcher. In February 1970, he gave a guided tour of the Western Wall Tunnel to the Knesset's legislative committee. One of the Knesset members was so impressed with Shenberger's knowledge, that he joked that if ever the architect needed a new job, he would be well-suited to be a tour guide.

== Personal life and legacy ==
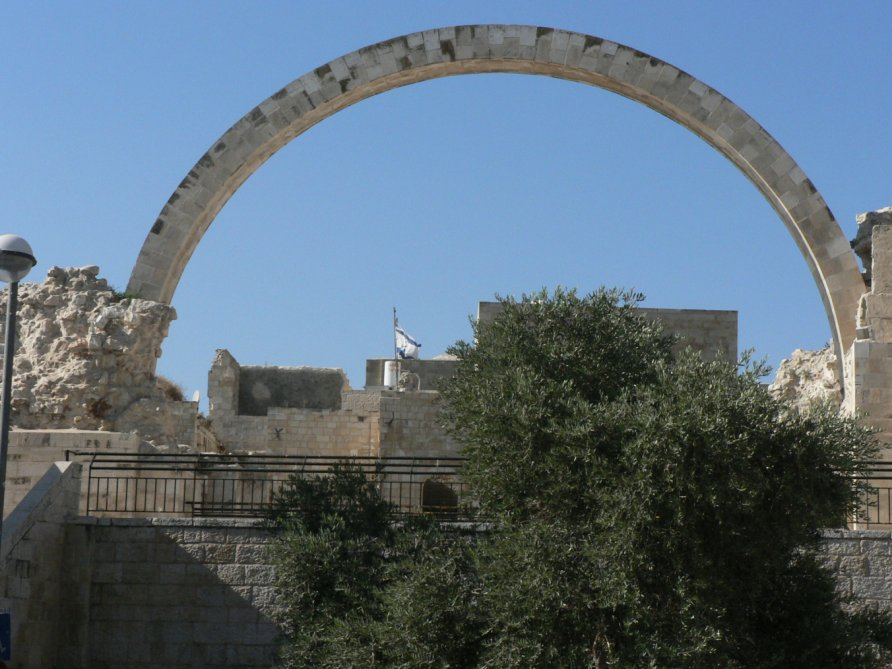
Hurva Synagogue in the Jewish Quarter of Jerusalem. Shenberger carried out its initial rehabilitation.

Shenberger was an Orthodox Jew. During his later years, he lived in the Jewish Quarter of Jerusalem until his death in 1982. He was buried in the Mount of Olives Jewish Cemetery. His daughter Rachel (1942 – 2019) was married to Yisrael Gans, a rosh yeshiva (dean) of Kol Torah, one of the yeshivas that Shenberger designed.

The Jerusalem Municipality named a street after Shenberger in the Ramot neighborhood.

== Published works ==
- Mikvaot, combines historical, halakhic and technical knowledge of mikvaot (ritual baths) suitable for both architects and poskim. (1974)
