= Bar'am National Park =

Park in Israel

- גן לאומי ברעם
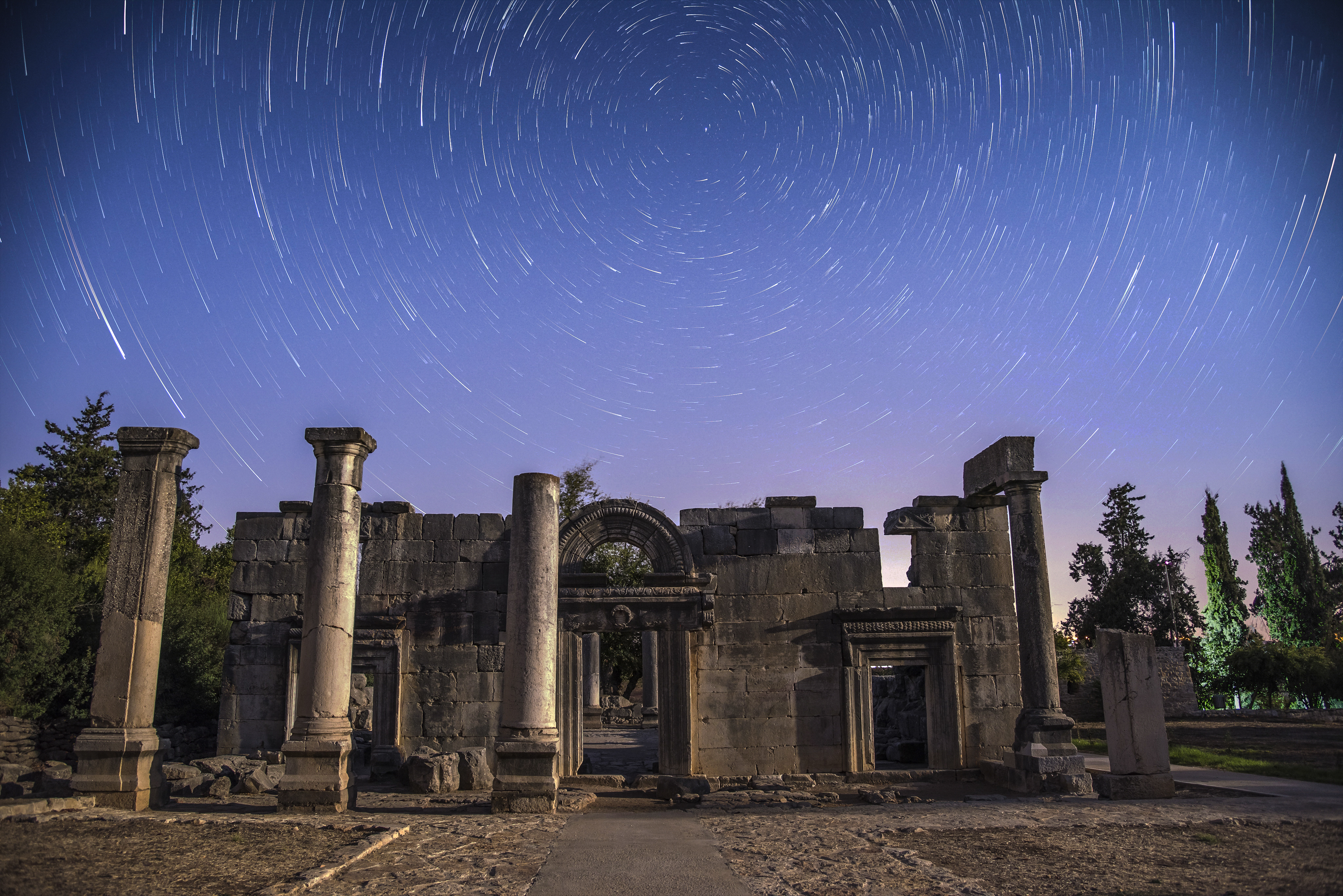
- Kfar Bar'am synagogue

- Location within Israel
- Coordinates: 33°2′38″N 35°24′51.04″E
- Website: Bar'am National Park

Bar'am National Park (Hebrew: גן לאומי ברעם) is a national park in Israel, between kibbutz Sasa and moshav Dovev, near the Lebanese border. On the grounds of the park is a two ancient Jewish synagogues from the Talmudic period, and the ruins of the depopulated Palestinian village of Kafr Bir'im, after which the park is named.

The original name of the village in which the synagogue was found is unknown, but it is indicative of the existence of an established Jewish community in the area where it was found.

== See also ==
- Kfar Bar'am synagogue
- Kfar Bar'am
