= Bar'am (disambiguation) =

Bar'am may refer to:

- A kibbutz in Northern Israel called Bar'am
- A village, now in a National Park, in Northern Israel, where remnants of two synagogues from Talmudic times were found. Called Kfar Bar'am, and also called Kafar Bir'im or Berem
- A section of the city of Jerusalem. Called Kfar Bar'am
- Kafr Bir'im, a Christian Arab village in Northern Israel, depopulated in 1948
