= Hila Lulu Lin =

Israeli multi-disciplinary artist (born 1964)

Hila Lulu Lin הילה לולו לין
- Born: 1964 (age 61–62); Afula, Israel
- Education: Bezalel Academy of Arts and Design
- Known for: Painting
- Movement: Israeli art

Hila Lulu Lin (Hebrew: הילה לולו לין; born November 6, 1964) is an Israeli multi-disciplinary artist, engaged in painting, cinema, poetry, sculpture, visual arts, photography, performance and video art.

== Biography ==
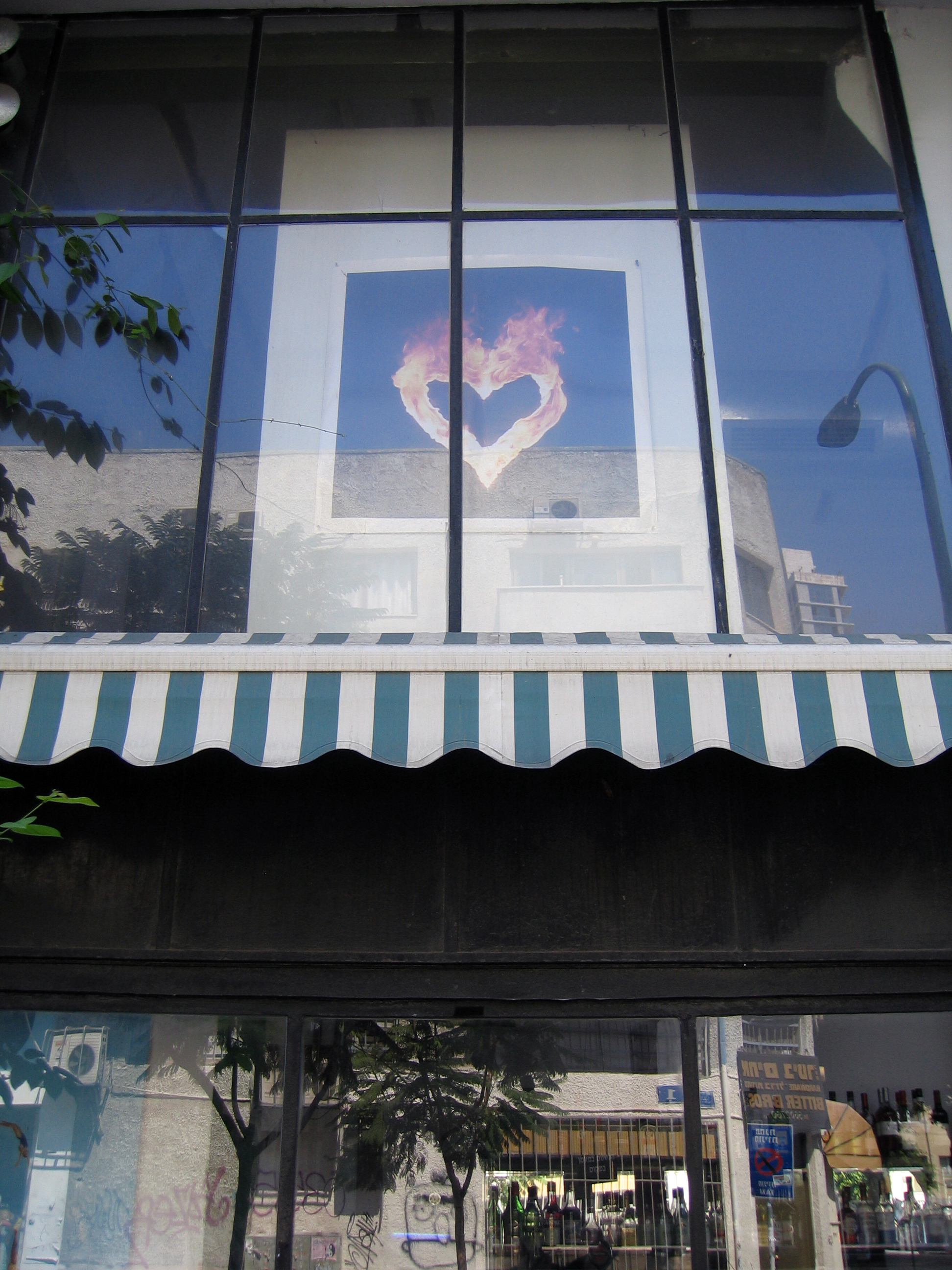
Photograph by Hila Lulu Lin

Hila Lin (later Lulu Lin) was born on Kibbutz Mishmar HaEmek. When she was two years old, her parents were sent to Qazvin, Iran for three years as aliyah emissaries. When the family returned to Israel they moved to Kfar Bilu. Lulu Lin studied at Bezalel Academy of Arts and Design in Jerusalem in 1986–1989.

She lives and works in Tel Aviv. Her partner is the artist Hanna Farah-Kufer Bir'im.

== Art career ==
Lin works in various artistic areas in local culture and her works has had a remarkable effect in Israeli art. Until Lin, in Israeli art, it was rare to deal with internal organs of body or connect them to architecture or transformation processes as they performed. She continually deals with body, sexuality, alienation, and detachedness, and the body of her works are sculpture, poetry, drawings, photographs, video works, and her later works - express a personal aesthetic that breaks normative boundaries.

Her artistic-surrealistic language is expressed in crossbreeding and manipulations that she creates in her body in front of a camera, processes computer simulations or expresses words in her poems, with rhetoric that combines erotica, fear, distress and rejection.

Her work echoes the trend of surrealism and Dada of the first half of the 20th century, but at the same time her artistic language speaks out beyond the trends of the era.

Lynn emerged in the scene in the late 1980s, with self-documentation video art including brusque images. She used her body as a way of presenting a body that is an infinite creative space that allows us to point to 'polar' tension between strangers and sellers, clean and impure, life and death, external and internal, large and small.

Her first solo, "The Voice of the Right" (1992), Lin presented sculptural objects made of various items, it was not conventional leave, but rather interrupting breaks between organic and synthetic, concrete and fictional, pleasurable and delightful. Her aesthetics get deeper into more physical direction later on, which already used as objects.

In "No More Tears" (1994), video work which was shown in the exhibition "Metasex 94: Identity, Body and Sexuality" (1994) sensuously expressed the experience of female embodiment in an erotic way. Lin manipulated an egg yolk on her body: the artist slowly rolls an egg yolk along her arm and into her mouth; then, gently easing it out of her mouth and repeated on other side. "Cold Blood" (A Poem in Three Parts), in 1996 created a moment before of Prime Minister Yitzhak Rabin's assassination. The hedonistic character of Tel Aviv's seashore was juxtaposed with the sacredness of the Dome of the Rock, the most sacred Muslim site in Jerusalem. Both iconic landscapes were depicted under raw, bloody skies.

At that time, Lin refused to give any interpretation to her work, and insisted on her right of movement and definition of identity without belonging to any art group. Nevertheless, she was characterized as: "A provocative challenge to the limited notion of women as mothers and nurturers, this sensuous back-and-forth demonstrated an embodied continuity between inside and outside, linking the passions and pleasures of food with those of sex."

Around the year 2000, Lin expanded the range and size of her works which also became more political, with materials from the public sphere entering and affecting her style.

In her art and poetry, Lin uses her own designed font for her work.

== Awards and recognition ==
- 1988-1994 America-Israel Cultural Foundation
- 1992 Prize for a Young Artist, Yad Lebanim Museum, Petah Tikvah and Ministry of Education
- 1995 Kadishman Young Artist Award on behalf of the American-Israel Cultural Foundation
- 1998 Minister of Education and Culture Prize for Visual Arts
- Arthur Goldreich Prize winner
- 2002 Isracard Award, Tel Aviv Museum of Art for an Israeli artist

== Selected exhibitions ==
=== Solo exhibitions ===
- 2012 – Wonderful World, N&N Aman Gallery, Tel Aviv-Yafo
- 2008 – She, Nelyi Aman Gallery, Tel Aviv-Yafo
- 2005 – Mole, Tel Aviv Museum of Art
- 2002 – Crying in Eight Minutes, Noga Gallery of Contemporary Art, Tel Aviv
- 2002 – I Need Some Money Honey, Ray Gun Gallery, Valencia, Spain
- 2000 – Absolute Naked, Noga Gallery of Contemporary Art, Tel Aviv
- 1999 – Sunny Side Up, Hallwalls Contemporary Arts Center, Buffalo, NY
- 1998 – Miles I Would Go, Haifa Museum of Art, Haifa
- 1998 – I Am the Queen in the Slave's Palace, The Artists' Studios Gallery, Tel Aviv
- 1997 – Pure & Wild, Ambrosino Gallery, Miami, Florida
- 1995 – The Air has a Sweet Taste, Nicole Klagsbrun Gallery, New York
- 1995 – A Cow, a Fish, and a Goldturtle, Ambrosino Gallery, Coral Gables, Florida
- 1995 – Everything is Six Times Lighter on the Moon, Artifact Gallery, Tel Aviv
- 1993 – Still Lifeless with Cub, Artifact Gallery, Tel Aviv
- 1992 – The Voice of Days, Bograshov Gallery, Tel Aviv
- 1992 – Never Dirty, The Art Workshop Gallery, Yavneh, Israel

=== Selected group exhibitions ===
- 2011 – New on Paper: Recent Acquisitions in the Prints and Drawings Collection, Israel museum, Jerusalem
- 2011 – Kaf Be'september, the Spaceship, Tel Aviv-Yafo
- 2011 – Lesbit Katlaneet, Hen Cinema, Tel Aviv-Yafo
- 2010 – Susan Hiller: a work in Progress, Israel Museum, Jerusalem
- 2010 – Stop Makin Sense, Oslo Kunstforening/Oslo Fine Art Society, Oslo, Norway
- 2010 – Israeli Art from the collection of Gaby and Ami Brown, Mishkan LeOmanut, Museum of Art, Ein Harod, Israel
- 2010 – More Then One, Jerusalem Print Workshop, Jerusalem
- 2009 – Rite Now: Sacred and Secular in Video, the Jewish Museum, NYC
- 2009 – Landsc®ape: Representation Matrixes, Petach Tikva Museum of Art, Petach Tikva
- 2006 – The Raft of the Medusa: Israeli Art and the Monster of Identity, Krolikarnia, The National Museum, Warsaw
- 2006 – Portfolios: From the Gottesman Etching Center, Kibbutz Cabri, The Israel Museum, Jerusalem; Tel Aviv Museum of Art
- 2006 – Far and Away: The Fantasy of Japan in Contemporary Israeli Art, The Israel Museum, Jerusalem
- 2004 – Seven Sins, Museo d'arte moderna e contemporanea, Bolzano, Italy
- 2004 – Love is in the Air, Time for Art – Israeli Art Center, Tel Aviv
- 2004 – Shame, The Israeli Center for Digital Art, Holon, Israel
- 2003 – Banquete, Centre of Contemporary Art, Palau de la Virreina, Barcelona; Zentrum für Kunst und Medientechnologie (ZKM), Karlsruhe; Conde Duque Cultural Centre, Madrid
- 2000 – Exposure: Recent Acquisitions, the Doron Sebbag Art Collection, O.R.S. Ltd., Tel Aviv Museum of Art
- 2000 – A Wall of My Own: Israeli Art, A Selection from the Benno Kalev Collection, Tel Aviv Museum of Art
- 2000 – The Vera, Silvia and Arturo Schwarz Collection of Contemporary Art, Tel Aviv Museum of Art
- 2000 – Local Time 1: New Video Works by Israeli Artists, Tel Aviv Cinematheque
- 1998 – To the East: Orientalism in the Arts in Israel, The Israel Museum, Jerusalem
- 1998 – Double Rivage, Centre Regional d'Art Contemporain, Sete, France
- 1997 – Delicious Art Exhibition, Tempozan Contemporary Art Museum, Osaka, Japan
- 1996 – Desert Cliché: Israel Now – Local Images, Mishkan Le'Omanut, Museum of Art, Ein Harod, Israel; Herzliya Museum of Art, Israel; Bass Museum of Art, Miami Beach, Florida; Grey Art Gallery, New York University; Nexus Contemporary Art Center, Atlanta; Yerba Buena Center for the Arts, San Francisco
- 1994 – Meta-Sex 94: Identity, Body and Sexuality, Mishkan Le'Omanut, Museum of Art, Ein Harod, Israel
- 1993 – Antipathos: Black Humor, Irony and Cynicism in Contemporary Israeli Art, The Israel Museum, Jerusalem
