= Aharon Leib Shteinman =

Israeli Haredi rabbi

HaRav Aharon Leib Shteinman
- אהרן לייב שטינמן
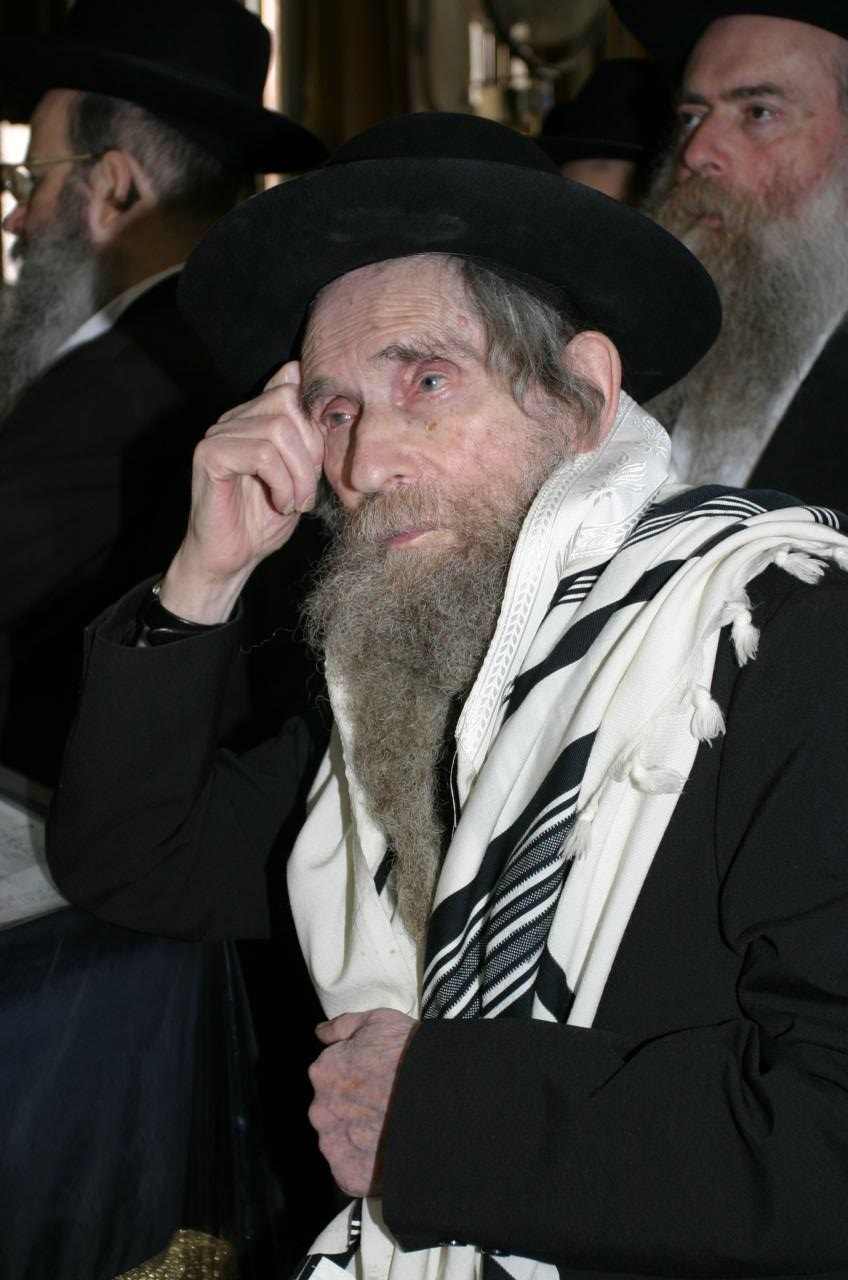

Personal life
- Born: Aharon Yehuda Leib Shteinman; November 3, 1914 Kamyenyets, Grodno Governorate, Russian Empire
- Died: December 12, 2017 (aged 103) Mayanei Hayeshua Medical Center, Bnei Brak, Israel
- Spouse: Tamar Kornfeld (died 2002)
- Children: 4
- Education: Yeshivas Etz Chaim
- Occupation: Rabbi; rosh yeshiva

Religious life
- Religion: Judaism
- Denomination: Haredi Judaism

Jewish leader
- Position: Rosh yeshiva
- Yeshiva: Ponevezh Yeshiva L'Tzi'irim
- Organization: Degel HaTorah
- Began: 1955
- Yahrtzeit: 24 Kislev 5778
- Residence: Bnei Brak

Aharon Yehuda Leib Shteinman (Hebrew: אהרן יהודה לייב שטינמן), also Shtainman or Steinman (November 3, 1914 – December 12, 2017), was a Haredi rabbi in Bnei Brak, Israel. Following the death of Yosef Shalom Elyashiv in 2012, he was widely regarded as the Gadol HaDor (Leader of the Generation), the leader of the non-Hasidic Lithuanian Haredi Jewish world. Along with several other rabbis, Shteinman is credited with reviving and expanding the appeal of European-style yeshivas in Israel.

== Early life ==
Aharon Yehuda Leib Shteiman was born in Kamyenyets (Kaminetz), the son of Noach Tzvi and Gittel Faiga, and raised in Brest (Brisk), then part of the Russian Empire. He studied in Yeshivas Toras Chessed in Brest, headed by Moshe Sokolovsky a rabbi known as the Imrei Moshe. He attended shiurim (Torah lectures) given by Yitzchok Zev Soloveitchik (the Brisker Rav). He also studied in Kletzk under Aharon Kotler.

Upon reaching draft age in 1937, Shteinman was subject to the Polish draft, as Brest had come under the control of the newly established Polish state in the aftermath of the First World War. He and his close friend, Moshe Soloveitchik (a grandson of Chaim Soloveitchik), tried to evade the draft by starving themselves, but they were declared fit to serve by the draft officer. The two then fled with other Brisk students to Montreux, Switzerland, where they returned to Torah study in Yeshivas Etz Chaim. With the outbreak of World War II, the two became war refugees, and were incarcerated in the Schonenberg labor camp near Basel, where nearly all the inmates were Torah-observant. Shteinman and his friend were put to work laying roads, but due to his thin frame and short stature, he was released from manual labor and assigned to a desk job. Shteinman was the only member of his family to survive the war.

Shteinman was known for his extremely modest lifestyle. His apartment, on Chazon Ish Street 5, was sparsely furnished, and had not been painted in many years. Until 2014, he slept on the same thin mattress that he had received from the Jewish Agency upon his arrival in Israel in the early 1950s.

== Rabbinic career ==
During his first years in Israel, Shteinman and his family lived in Kfar Saba; his sons were sent to a cheder in Petah Tikva. Eventually, they relocated to Bnei Brak, where he headed the Ponevezh Kollel. In 1955, the Ponevezher Rav, Yosef Shlomo Kahaneman, opened the yeshivah ketanah of Ponevezh, called Ponevezh L'Tzi'irim, and asked Shteinman to serve as rosh yeshiva (dean), together with Michel Yehuda Lefkowitz. Shteinman stopped giving his regular shiur in 1998, but retained the title of rosh yeshiva. He was also rosh yeshiva of Yeshivas Gaon Yaakov, which is led by his son-in-law, Zev Berlin.

Despite publicly supporting life-long Torah study and discouraging education that focused on secular learning, Shteinman's private positions were perceived as more nuanced and accommodating. This made him a target of criticism from both right-wing elements of the Haredi world, as well as reformists. He supported the idea of Charedim who are not learning and eligible to be drafted into the IDF being drafted to the Netzah Yehuda Battalion, a religious section of the Israel Defense Forces. Rabbi Shteinman is widely cited as ruling, that bochurim who are not fit for full-time Torah study will benefit from being in Netzah Yehuda.

== Political career ==
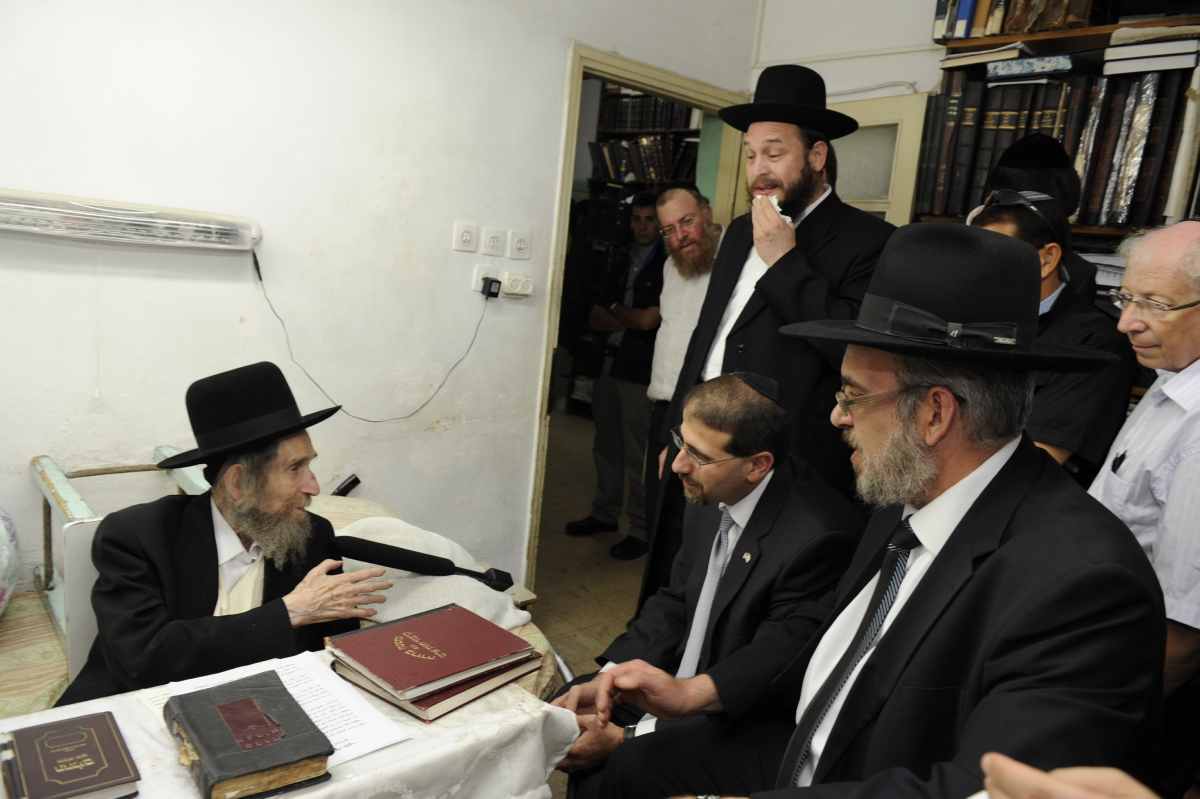
United States Ambassador to Israel Dan Shapiro visits Shteinman in his home, 2011

When Elazar Shach, the founder of the Haredi Degel HaTorah political party, would be consulted for advice, he would sometimes refer people to Shteinman. Shteinman was a leader of Degel HaTorah, and exerted much political power in the United Torah Judaism political coalition. He was close with Yaakov Aryeh Alter (the Gerrer Rebbe), a major supporter of Agudat Yisrael.

== Travels abroad ==
When he was in his nineties, Shteinman undertook to visit and strengthen key Haredi and other religious Jewish communities outside of Israel. In 2005, he visited a number of cities in North America with significant Haredi populations or institutions, including Brooklyn, Lakewood, New York City, and Passaic. He met with many American Haredi rabbis, including Aharon Schechter of Yeshiva Rabbi Chaim Berlin. In 2006, he traveled to the Jewish community of Los Angeles on Lag Ba'omer, where over 5,000 individuals attended the gathering. He planned to travel together with Yaakov Aryeh Alter (the Gerrer Rebbe) to Montreal in May 2006, but they delayed their trip to avoid protests from the Neturei Karta. After visiting Montreal, the rabbis parted ways. The Gerrer Rebbe continued to New York, and then returned to Jerusalem, while Shteinman went on to visit the Jewish communities in several South American cities, including Mexico City and Buenos Aires.

In May 2007, Shteinman visited France, followed by England, where he addressed large gatherings in Manchester and Gateshead. In June 2010, Shteinman visited the Jewish communities of Odessa, Berlin, and Gibraltar. In 2012, he traveled to Paris to deliver talks to the French Jewish community.

== Personal life ==
While still in Switzerland, Shteinman married Tamar (Tema) Kornfeld (d. 2002), the daughter of Shammai Shraga Kornfeld of Antwerp. She had been sent to Switzerland from Poland to cure her respiratory problems, and had also become a refugee when World War II broke out. The couple had four children.

== Death ==
In December 2016, Shteinman was hospitalized with pneumonia at Mayanei Hayeshua Medical Center in Bnei Brak. He eventually recovered, but doctors said at the time that they were "very concerned", and that a "general decline" in his physical condition had begun. In January 2017, at 102 years of age, Shteinman was again hospitalized. The Jerusalem Post reported that he was suffering from shortness of breath and an infection-related fever. He was released after two weeks in intensive care. He was again hospitalized in October 2017 for fever and weakness, and was released after several days in intensive care. Two weeks later, while he was at the hospital for testing, there was an unexpected deterioration of his health. Shteinman died on December 12, 2017, at age 103. His funeral was attended by an estimated 400,000 Jews.

== Published works ==
Shteinman was the author of a popular series of kuntresim (pamphlets) on Torah subjects such as emunah (faith), chinuch (education), and hashgacha (Divine providence). The pamphlets are based on shiurim that he began giving to Ponevezh Kollel students in his home in 1994, and on shmuessen (ethical talks) that he began giving to students in Yeshivas Gaon Yaakov in 1978. Ranging in size from 24 to 100 pages, the pamphlets quickly sold out. An English-language translation of many of these subjects was published in 2013 by Israel Book Shop under the title Leading with Love: Guidance for Our Generation from Maran HaRav Aharon Yehudah Leib Shteinman shlit"a on Torah, Emunah, Chinuch, the Home, and More.

Shteinman originally published his main works on the Talmud anonymously under the name Ayelet HaShachar (alluding to his initials and those of his wife, Tamar [AYeLeT = Aharon Yehuda Leib Tamar], in Hebrew, as well as the "morning star" of Psalms 22).

Ayeles HaShachar al HaTorah (on the Pentateuch)

- Breishis
- Shmos
- Vayikra
- Bamidbar
- Devarim

Ayeles HaShachar on Shas (Talmud)

- Bava Metziah
- Bava Kama
- Gittin
- Yevamos
- Makkos and Shevuos
- Nedarim
- Kiddushin
- Zevachim 1 2 3

Chessed Umishpat on Maseches Sanhedrin

Yimaleh Pi Tehilasecha 1 2 - Mussar shmusen (ethical talks)

Mipekudecha Esbonan - Talks on Yomim Noraim (days of awe)
