= Mayanei Hayeshua Medical Center =

Hospital in Israel

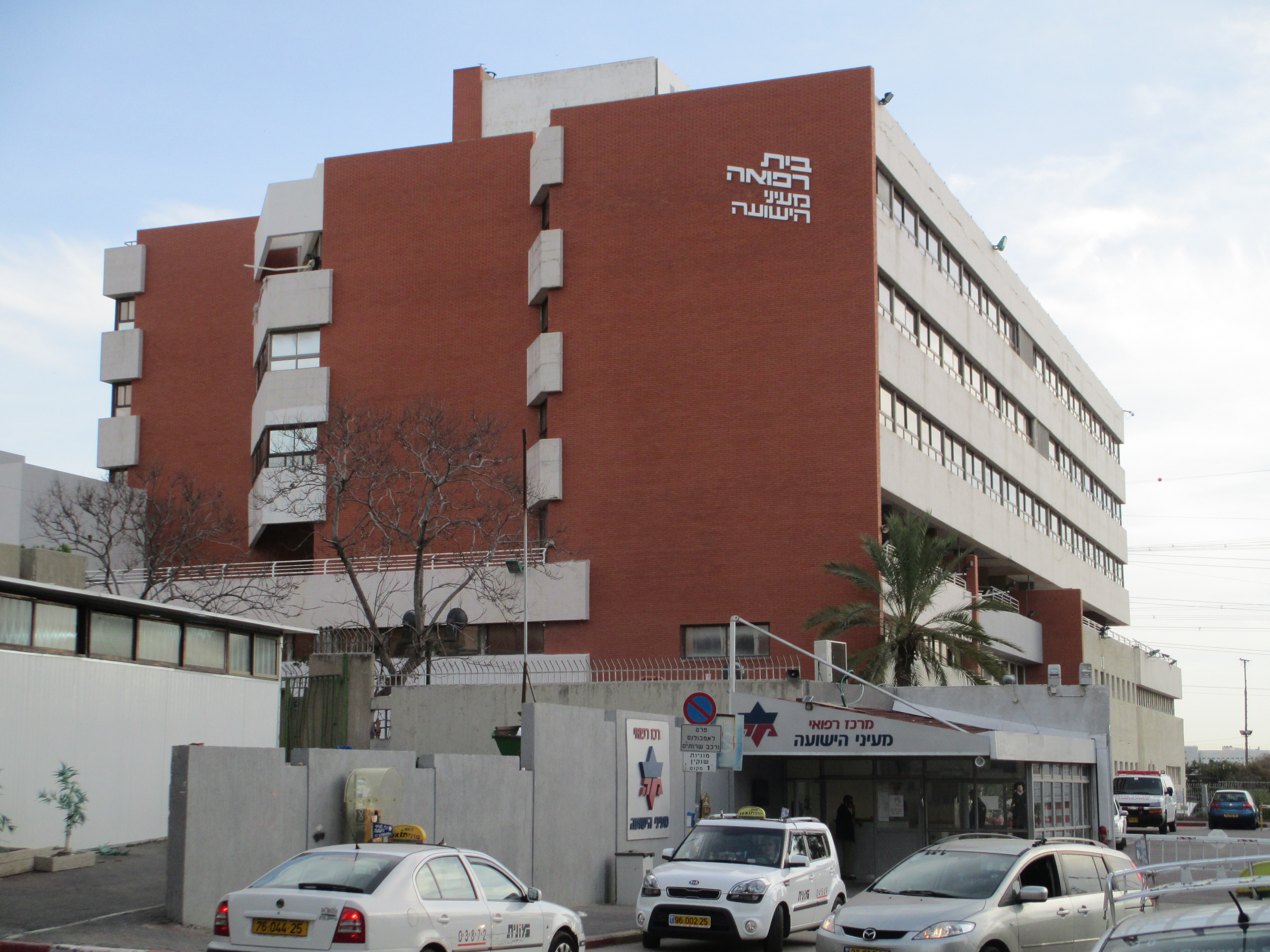
- West side of Maayanei Hayeshuah Medical Center

Geography
- Location: Bnei Brak, Israel
- Coordinates: 32.085°N 34.8441°E

Organisation
- Type: Independent
- Religious affiliation: Haredi Judaism
- Affiliated university: None
- Patron: Yehoshua Frishwasser

Services
- Beds: 320

History
- Opened: 1990

Links
- Website: www.mymc.co.il

Mayanei Hayeshua Medical Center (MHMC) is a Haredi hospital in Bnei Brak, Israel. Initially focusing on maternity, it is now a general hospital. MHMC's affairs are managed in strict accordance with halakha (Jewish law).

== History ==
Mayanei Hayeshua Medical Center (MHMC) was established by Moshe Rothschild, a doctor who was concerned that the distance of the two closest hospitals to Bnei Brak, Beilinson Hospital and Sheba Medical Center, was creating a health hazard for its residents. He was also interested in providing the Haredi residents of Bnei Brak and Gush Dan with a hospital run according to halakha (Jewish law). Rothschild was encouraged by a number of rabbis to build the hospital, including Yaakov Yisrael Kanievsky, Elazar Shach and the Baba Sali.

Rothschild founded the "Hospital Association", which worked to realise its establishment. It took him about 14 years to plan the project and raise the funds worldwide, which totaled about US$20M. During one visit to the United States, Rothschild went in to see Menachem Mendel Schneerson, who produced an open cheque and said, "Fill in any amount that you decide"; Rothschild wrote down $1,000. He purchased a tract of rocky land that had been designated according to the zoning plan (Taba) for a municipal pool, and did not hesitate even after the city engineer sent him a warning letter that he might be wasting all his money for nothing.

MHMC was designed by Yosef Shenberger and his partner, Tuvia Kätz. The cornerstone was laid on 7 December 1978, but construction only commenced during the 1980s, and took five and a half years to build. The hospital was inaugurated in March 1990 with thousands in attendance, including government officials such as Shimon Peres. MHMC commenced operations on 23 August 1990 with the opening of a maternity ward. At first, the hospital included only this ward, but within a few years, many more were opened, including a six-story Mental Health Center,which features an eating-disorder clinic.

== Leadership ==
Historically, MHMC has been managed by three distinct groups: A board of directors, an association of rabbis and public servants, and most influential of all, the "Halakhic Supervision Committee", a rabbinical committee consisting of Shmuel Wosner, Nissim Karelitz and Yitzchok Zilberstein, with Yisrael Rand, a confidant of Aharon Yehuda Leib Shteinman, serving as its secretary. Starting around 2010, some controversy arose as to who would take over the reins of control from the founder and director. Rothschild wanted his son Shlomo to become director, while the rabbinical committee thought him to be a poor choice. In 2013, Chaim Kanievsky wrote a letter of recommendation for Shlomo, with Shteinman and Wosner signing on. One year later, Kanievsky was persuaded to join the board of directors, and all remaining opposition to Shlomo dissipated.

== Location ==
MHMC is located on the east side of Bnei Brak, on the outskirts of the Ramat Aharon and Or Haim neighborhoods. It also serves the residents of nearby Giv'at Shmuel, Petah Tikva and Ramat Gan.

== Mission ==
As an independent Haredi community hospital, MHMC's uniqueness is in the fact that it is strictly managed according to halakha. If during any medical procedure there might arise some halakhic doubt, the medical staff will activate the halakhic team, which is headed by the hospital's rabbi. Only after the halakhic ruling is issued can the medical activity be carried out. MHMC has its own beth midrash (Jewish study hall) on the premises.

== Departments ==
MHMC consists of 18 medical departments and 32 outpatient clinics, including 12 dialysis units. Starting out as a maternity hospital, the center now features a high-risk pregnancy ward and a neonatal intensive care unit. With a 500 bed capacity, it handles 13,000 births per year, and carried out more than 12,000 surgical procedures in 2025.
