= Dovev =

Moshav in northern Israel

Dovev: דּוֹבֵ״ב (Hebrew)
- Location within Northeast Israel Location within Israel
- Coordinates: 33°3′8″N 35°24′27″E
- Country: Israel
- District: Northern
- Subdistrict: Acre
- Council: Merom HaGalil
- Affiliation: Moshavim Movement
- Founded: 1963
- Founder: Moroccan and Iranian Jews
- Population (2024): 515

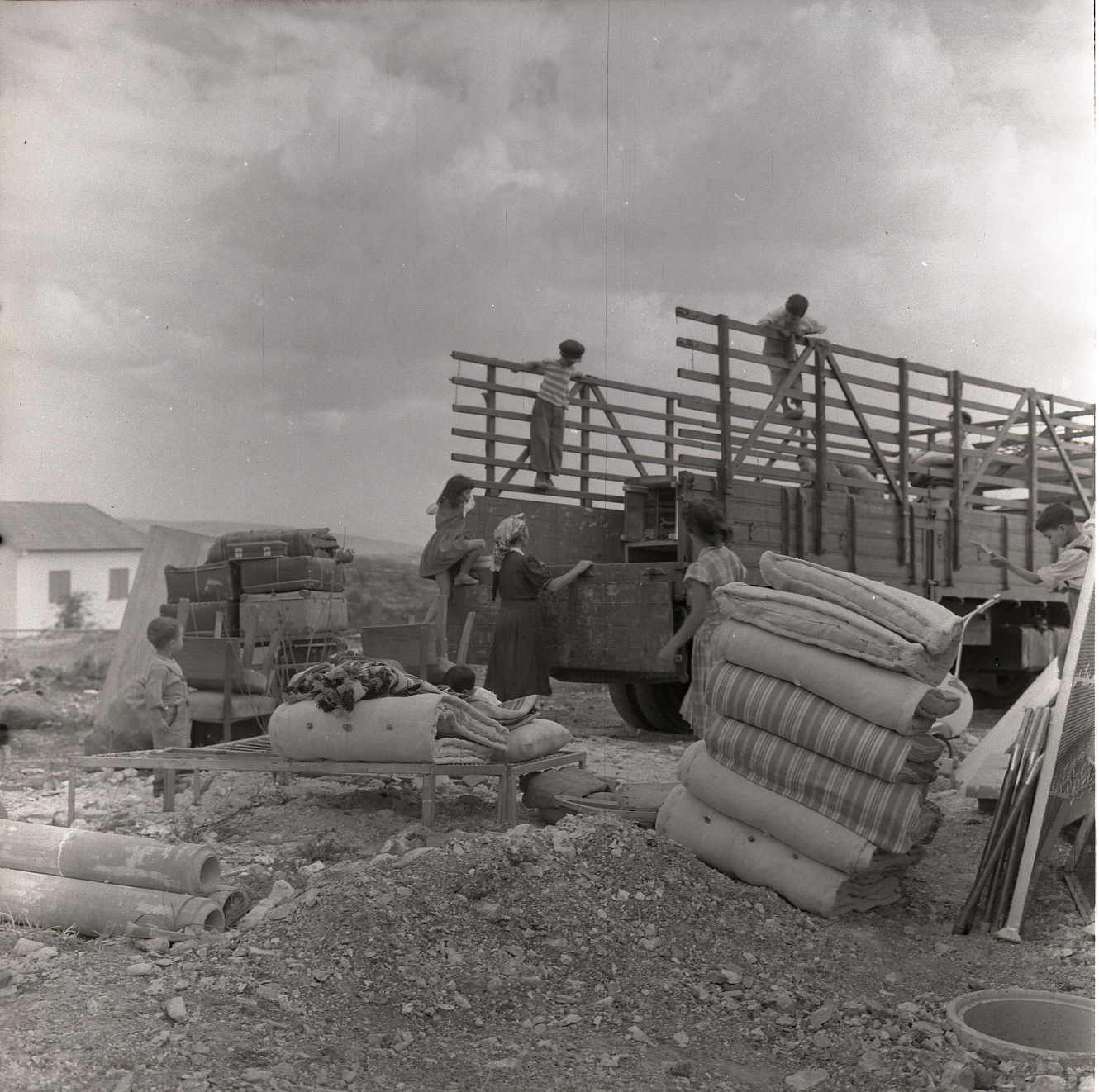
Immigrants coming to Dovev, 1958. Boris Carmi, Meitar collection, National Library of Israel

Dovev (Hebrew: דּוֹבֵ״ב) is a moshav in northern Israel. Located in the Upper Galilee around 7 km north of Har Meron near Israel's border with Lebanon, it falls under the jurisdiction of Merom HaGalil Regional Council. As of 2024 it had a population of 515.

== History ==
The moshav was founded in 1958 by immigrants and refugees to Israel from Morocco and Iran on land near the depopulated Palestinian Arab village of Kafr Bir'im, northwest of the village site. It was named after David Bloch-Blumenfeld (Dovev is an acronym of his initials), one of the leaders of the Labor Movement in the land of Israel, who was a mayor of Tel Aviv. East of the moshav is a nature reserve, the pond of Dovev.

Most residents of Dovev were evacuated due to safety concerns during the 1982 Lebanon War and again in Operation Grapes of Wrath in 1996. In 2006, four Katyusha rockets landed on the outskirts of the moshav, damaging fruit trees.

During the Gaza war, northern Israeli border communities, including Dovev, faced targeted attacks by Hezbollah and Palestinian factions based in Lebanon, and were evacuated.

On 1 November 2023, an anti-tank missile attack launched by Hezbollah operatives killed a 56-year-old Israeli civilian, an employee of the Israel Electric Corporation, and injured five workers who were repairing electric lines damaged in a prior assault.

== See also ==
- Baram National Park
