= Barm-e Siah Rudtalkh =

Barm-e Siah Rudtalkh برم سياه رودتلخ
- Village
- Location within Iran
- Coordinates: 31°10′54″N 50°01′29″E
- Country: Iran
- Province: Kohgiluyeh and Boyer-Ahmad
- County: Bahmai
- Bakhsh: Bahmai-ye Garmsiri
- Rural District: Bahmai-ye Garmsiri-ye Shomali

Population (2006)
  - Total: 36
- Time zone: UTC+3:30 (IRST)
  - Summer (DST): UTC+4:30 (IRDT)

Barm-e Siah Rudtalkh (Persian: برم سياه رودتلخ, also Romanized as Barm-e Sīāh Rūdtalkh; also known as Baram Seh and Barm-e Sīāh) is a village in Bahmai-ye Garmsiri-ye Shomali Rural District, Bahmai-ye Garmsiri District, Bahmai County, Kohgiluyeh and Boyer-Ahmad Province, Iran. At the 2006 census, its population was 36, in 8 families.
