= Association of Engineers in Israel =

Engineering organization of Israel

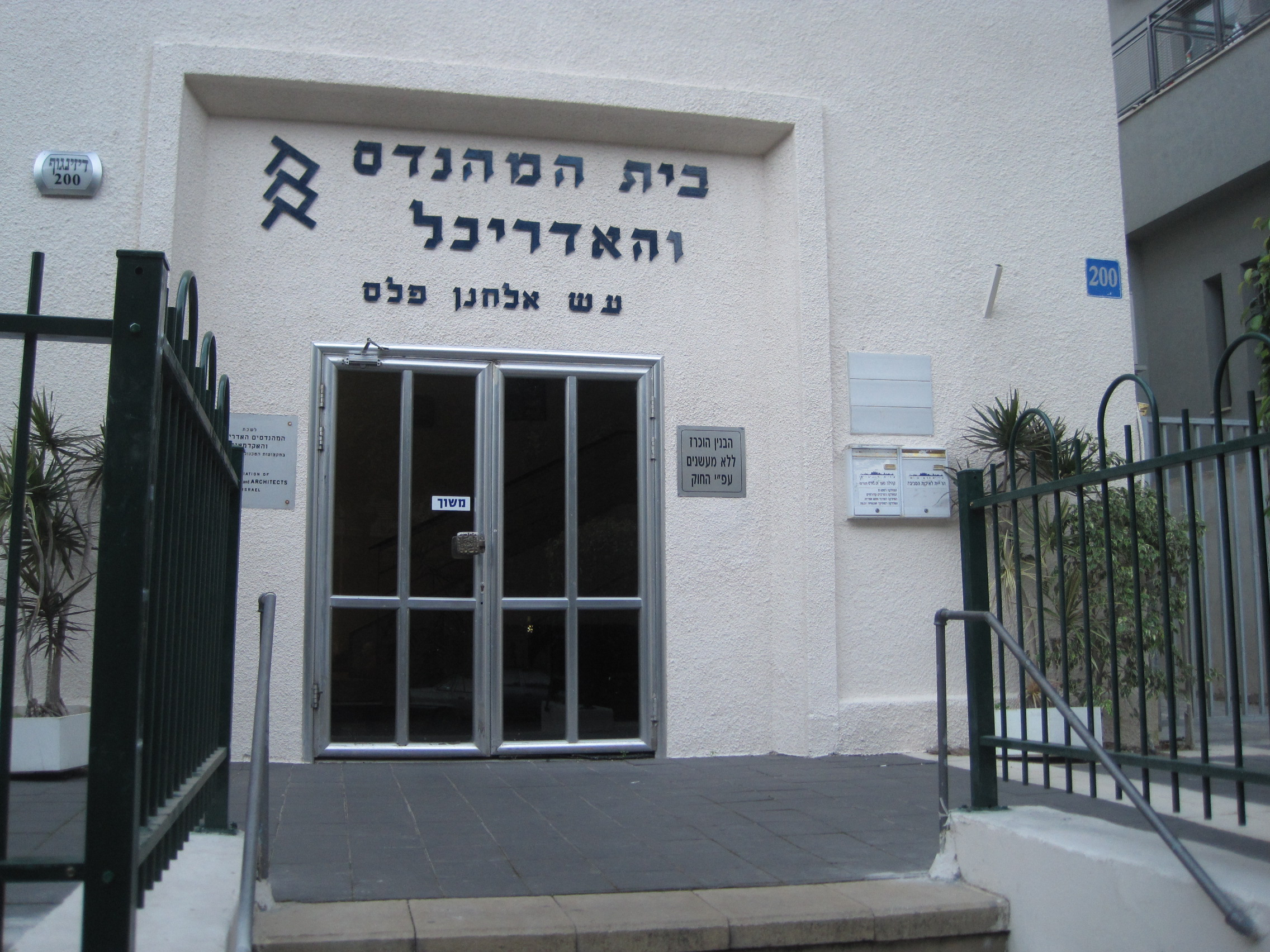
A building for the Association of Engineers in Israel

The Association of Engineers, Architects and Graduates in Technological Sciences in Israel (AEAI) is the professional representative body of these sectors in the country. The association aims to be a national center, which cultivates and promotes the engineering, architecture and technology economy, as well as works to promote the professional status of the engineers and architects in Israel.

== History ==
The Association of Engineers, Architects and Graduates in Technological Sciences in Israel was established in 1922, for the engineers and architects communities and built in Tel-Aviv in 1936 the "Engineer and Architect House" for its activities. Over the course of the years, the AEAI established professional public institutions such as the Standards Institution of Israel, Israel Institute of Productivity and The Israeli Building Center. In 1985 the AEAI expended, adding up graduates in the technological sciences.

The association led to the legislation of the Engineers and Architects Law in the Knesset in 1958. The law regulates the professions of engineering and architecture, and ensures that the public receives professional services (planning, counseling, supervision and performance) only from those authorized for that purpose. This law has been modified, the last of which was in 1992.

== Legal status ==
The association is acknowledged in the Engineers and Architects law, in the Planning and Building law, in the Standards law and in the Free Production Zone law. The association is also acknowledged by the Ministry of Industry (responsible by the government for the Engineers and Architects law), as the representative organization for engineering and architecture professions in Israel.

The association has a "representative on the government body overseeing infrastructure safety."

== Institutes ==
There is a National Congress in the AEAI, chosen by all its members in a proportional representation election. The senior positions, such as the president, the chairman, the professional societies chairmen etc., are voluntary. The AEAI current president is Eng. Yitzhak Raz. The association chairman is Eng. Ehud Noff, who also serves as chairman of the Federation of Engineers (the labor union). Within the Association of Engineers there are professional societies in various technological fields:Civil Engineering, Mechanical Engineering, Chemical Engineering and Chemistry, Electrical and Electronics Engineering, Industrial and Management Engineering, Safety Engineering, Computer Science and Software, Construction and Infrastructure Engineering, Architecture and City planning and Municipal Engineering. The branches within the professional societies operate on specific or multi-disciplinary issues. - There are four regional centers: Tel Aviv and the Center, Haifa and the North, Beer Sheva and the south and Jerusalem. Recently the AEAI had also activated branches in workplaces employing a large number of engineers, such as: Israel Aircraft Industries, the Military Industry, Bezeq and the IDF Employees.

== Activities within the association ==
- Professional updates via courses, national and international conferences, seminars, professional tours, professional lectures, etc., in order to regularly expose the engineers to innovations in their fields, and thus improve and promote their professional level. Members enjoy significant discounts in these activities. - Initiating and changing legislation in the fields of engineering and technology, in order to make sure that the general public will receive services only from those authorized for that purpose. - Representation of the engineering professions in public and statutory institutions: the Association of Engineers has nine representatives in the Engineering and Architecture Council. The association has also representatives in other important institutions, such as: the Israeli Standards Institution, the Higher Education Institution, Knesset committees, regional and local construction committees etc., allowing a direct influence on the economy. - Appointing arbitrators and experts as a service to the Israeli courthouse and the general public. - Relationships with parallel organizations in Israel and abroad. - Relationships with academic institutions, in which the engineering, architecture, science and technology subjects are studied, as well as establishing and maintaining connections with the industry. - Integration of engineering students and young graduates in the associations' professional activities, in order to nurture the next generation. - Publications of relevant information via the Association Website and newsletters.

== Former key figures ==
Name	Years	Title	Years under title
Yosef Levi	1885-1949	President	1922-1923
Yosef Berlin	1877-1952	President	1923-1924
M. Burger	-	President	1924-1925
Yaacov Riser	1893-1974	President	1935-1928
Moshe Lidezhinski	-	President	1941-1942
Yaacov Ben-Sira (Shiffman)	1899-1994	President	1943-1945
Mordechai Stern	1914-1975	President	1948-1949
Isaac Vilentchuk	-	President	1950-1952
Elhanan Peles	-	CEO & chairman	CEO-1952-1972; chairman-1984-1986
Uriel Shalon	-	Chairman	1953-1956, 1960-1963
Arnold Moshe Arnan	-	Chairman	1958-1957
Alexander Chechik	-	Chairman	1963-1966
Arieh Sharon	1900-1984	Chairman	1966-1970
Uriel Shtok	-	Chairman	1978-1981, 1982-1983
Uri Harmal	-	Chairman	1981-1982
Avraham Yaski	1927-2014	Chairman and president	Chairman-1984-1987; president-1987
Yitzhak Raz	-	Chairman and president	Chairman 1987-1990, 2002-2015; president 2016-
Yaakov Hai	-	Chairman	1997-2001
Amos Berkowits	-	Chairman	2001-2002
Eli Cohen Kagan	-	CEO	1997-2002
Yuval Ne'eman	-	President	1998-2002
Dr. Yoav Sarne	-	President	2005-2013
Ehud Menipaz	-	Chairman	Unknown - present
