= Kfar Bar'am synagogue =

Ancient synagogue ruins in northern Israel

Kfar Bar'am Synagogue
- Hebrew: כְּפַר בַּרְעָם
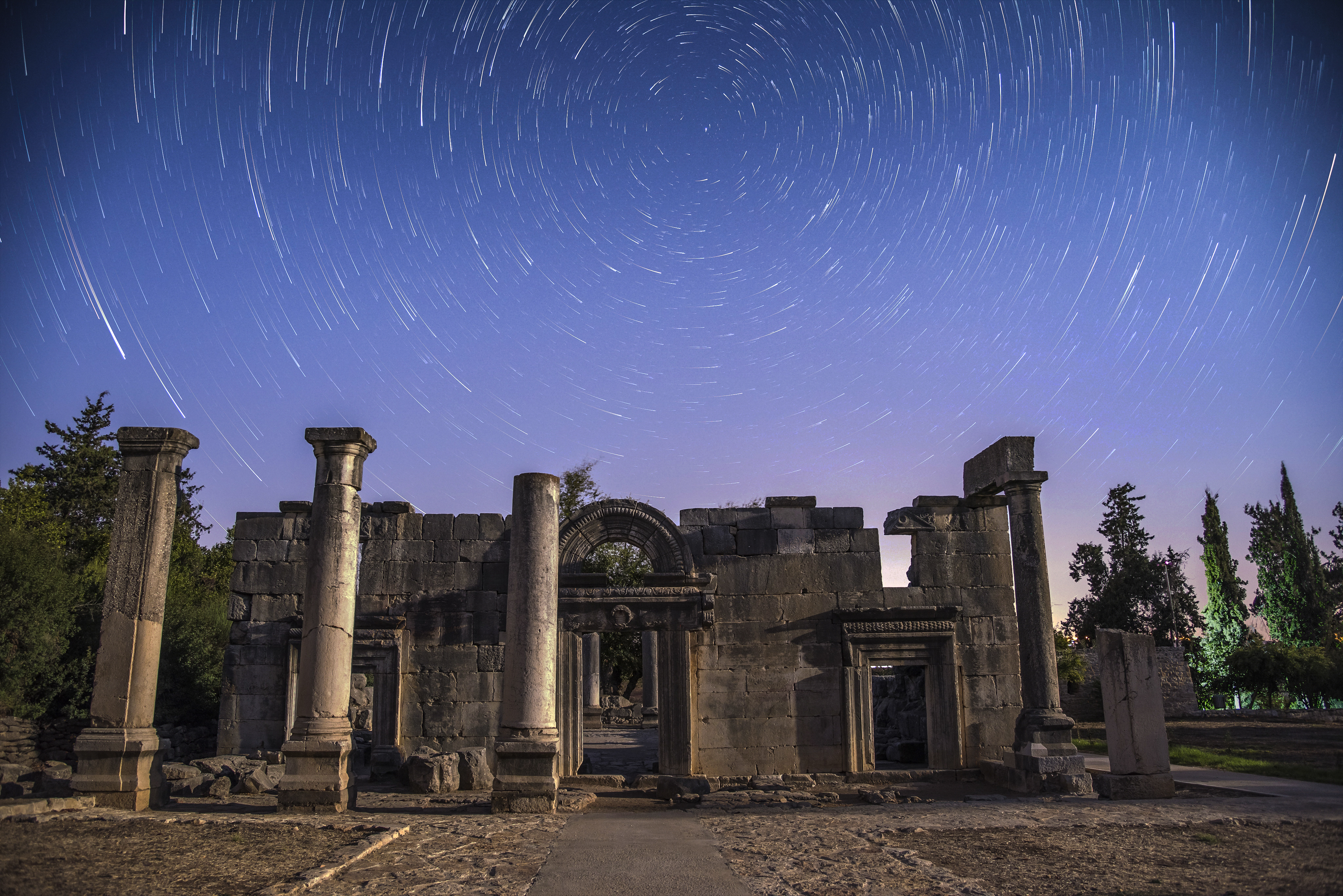
- A long-exposure photograph of the ruins of the former synagogue, in 2017

- Location of the ruins of the former synagogue, in modern-day Israel

Religion
- Affiliation: Judaism (former)
- Ecclesiastical or organizational status: Synagogue
- Status: Archaeological site

Location
- Location: Bar'am National Park, Galilee, Northern District
- Country: Israel
- Interactive map of Kfar Bar'am Synagogue
- Coordinates: 33°02′37″N 35°24′51″E

Architecture
- Completed: c. 220 CE
- Direction of façade: South

The Kfar Bar'am Synagogue (Hebrew: כְּפַר בַּרְעָם), also known as the Kafar Berem Synagogue, is the archaeological ruins of two former ancient Jewish synagogues, located at the site of Kafr Bir'im, a former Palestinian Christian village, in what is today the Bar'am National Park. The synagogue is in the Galilee region of the Northern District of Israel, approximately 3 kilometres (1.9 mi) from the border with Lebanon. It is estimated that the former synagogue was completed in the 3rd century, during the Roman period, likely by c. 220 CE, and was located in the medieval Jewish village of Kfar Bar'am.

The façade of the 3rd-century synagogue faces south, towards Jerusalem, as the custom of most synagogues, and was replete with a covered portico containing six stone columns.

It was first identified as a synagogue in modern times in 1852 – along with other similar remains in Galilee – by Edward Robinson in his Biblical Researches in Palestine.

== Etymology ==
The name is often assumed to mean "Son of the People," incorporating the Aramaic word bar בר, meaning "son" and the Hebrew word am עם meaning "people". However, if like at Shfar'am, both elements are Hebrew, the name could derive from a literary Hebrew word בר indicating cleanliness, purity, pristineness and wholesomeness - "The wholesome people" or "wholesomeness of the people".

== History ==
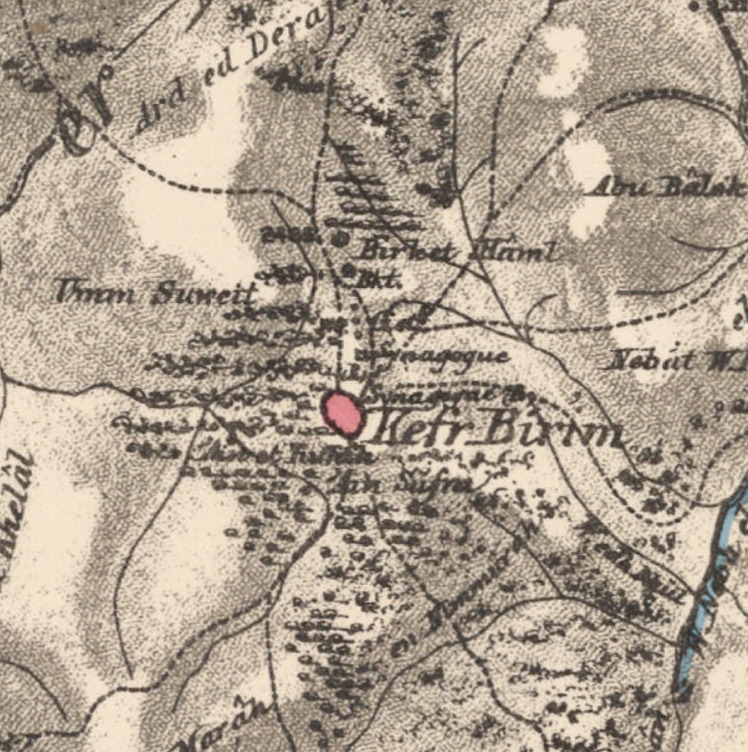
Kafr Bir'im village on PEF Survey of Palestine map from the 1870s, with the two synagogue ruins labelled.

Kafr Bir'im was established in ancient times, during the Roman period, in Talmudic times, most likely by c. 220 CE. According to Jewish tradition, Pinchas ben Yair (2nd-century CE) was buried in Kfar Bir'im. It was inhabited by Jews until the 13th century, if not later. After a period of Muslim inhabitation, by the 19th century the village was entirely Christian, comprising Maronites and Melkites. A church on the site, the Maronite church, was in regular use.

The village was badly damaged in the Galilee earthquake of 1837. The local church and a row of columns and other standing remains of the ancient synagogue were thrown to the ground.

Along with other such structures in the Galilee, the ruins were first identified as a synagogue in modern times in 1852 by Edward Robinson in his Biblical Researches in Palestine. Robinson wrote of his visit to Kafr Bir'im:

As these remains were the first of the kind that we had yet seen; and were of a style of architecture utterly unknown to us; we were at a loss for some time what to make of them. They were evidently neither Greek nor Roman. The inscription, if authentic, obviously marks both structures as of Jewish origin; and as such, they could only have been synagogues. We were, however, not satisfied on this point, until we found at Meirôn the same species of architecture, in the acknowledged remains of an ancient Jewish synagogue. We afterwards found the ruins of like structures at Irbid, Tell Hum, Kedes, and perhaps other places in Galilee; all marked with the same architectural peculiarities. The size, the elaborate sculptured ornament, and the splendour of these edifices, do not belong to a scattered and down-trodden people; such as the Jews have been in these regions ever since the fourth century. These costly synagogues, therefore, can be referred only to the earlier centuries of the Christian era; when Galilee was the chief seat of the Jews; and Jewish learning and schools flourished at Tiberias. All these circumstances would seem to mark a condition of prosperity and wealth and influence among the Jews of Galilee in that age, of which neither their own historians, nor any other, have given us any account.

The village was captured October 31, 1948 by the Israel Defense Forces during operation Hiram and the villagers forced to leave. On June 16, 1949, Kibbutz Bar'am was founded nearby by demobilized Palmach soldiers.

== Archaeology ==
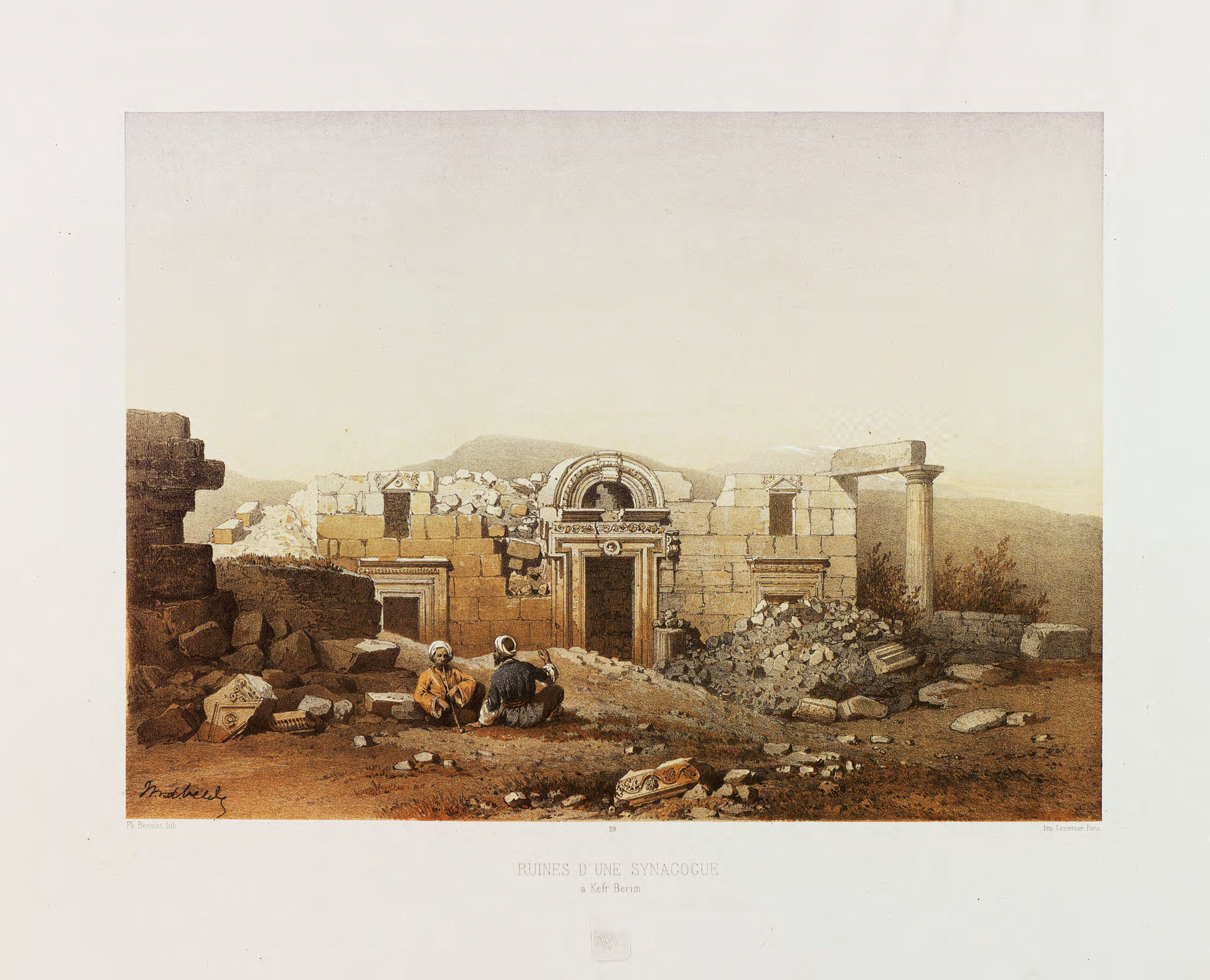
Ruins of the ancient synagogue, by Van de Velde, 1857

The Kfar Bar'am synagogue is preserved up to the second story and has been restored. The architecture is similar to that of other synagogues in the Galilee built in the Talmudic period. In 1522, Rabbi Moses Basula wrote that the synagogue belonged to Simeon bar Yochai, who survived the Second Jewish War in 132–135 CE (the Bar-Kochba revolt). Archaeologists, however, have concluded that the building was built at least a century later. According to another tradition, the synagogue was built in honor of Rabbi Shimon bar Yochai, and bore his name. Israeli archaeologist Lipa Sukenik (1889–1953), who was instrumental in establishing the Department of Archaeology at the Hebrew University, excavated a relief in one of the synagogues in 1928, and dated the Bar’am synagogue to the 3rd century CE.

The synagogue is made of basalt stone, standard for most buildings in the area, and its façade faces south, towards Jerusalem, as the custom of most synagogues. The six-column portico is unusual. The front entrance of the synagogue has three doorways that face Jerusalem. In front of the entrance are some of the (originally eight) columns with Attic bases which supported a porch. There is an inscription under the right window on the facade, which reads: "Banahu Elazar bar Yodan", which means "Elazar bar Yodan built it". Elazar bar Yodan is a Jewish Aramaic name. The interior of the synagogue was divided by rows of columns into three aisles and an ambulatory.

An unusual feature in an ancient synagogue is the presence of three-dimensional sculpture, a pair of stone lions. A similar pair of three-dimensional lions was found at Chorazin. A carved frieze features a winged victory and images of animals and, possibly, human figures.

There was a second, smaller synagogue, but little of it was found. A lintel from this smaller synagogue is at the Louvre. The Hebrew inscription on the lintel reads, "Peace be upon the place, and on all the places of Israel." A replica of the lintel is exhibited at the Bar-Dor Museum on Kibbutz Bar'am.

In 1901, publication of photos of the ancient synagogue led the Jewish Hospital of Philadelphia, (now the Albert Einstein Medical Center,) to erect a synagogue, the Henry S. Frank Memorial Synagogue, inspired by Bar'am and other ancient Israeli synagogues. The hospital's synagogue replicated the round arch of the door of the standing ruin and the lintel from the smaller synagogue that is now in the Louvre.

== See also ==
- Ancient synagogues in the Palestine region
  - Ancient synagogues in Israel
- Archaeology of Israel
- Bar'am National Park
- History of the Jews in Israel
- List of synagogues in Israel
- Oldest synagogues in the world
