= Bar'am =

Kibbutz in northern Israel

Bar'am: ברעם (Hebrew)
- Kibbutz
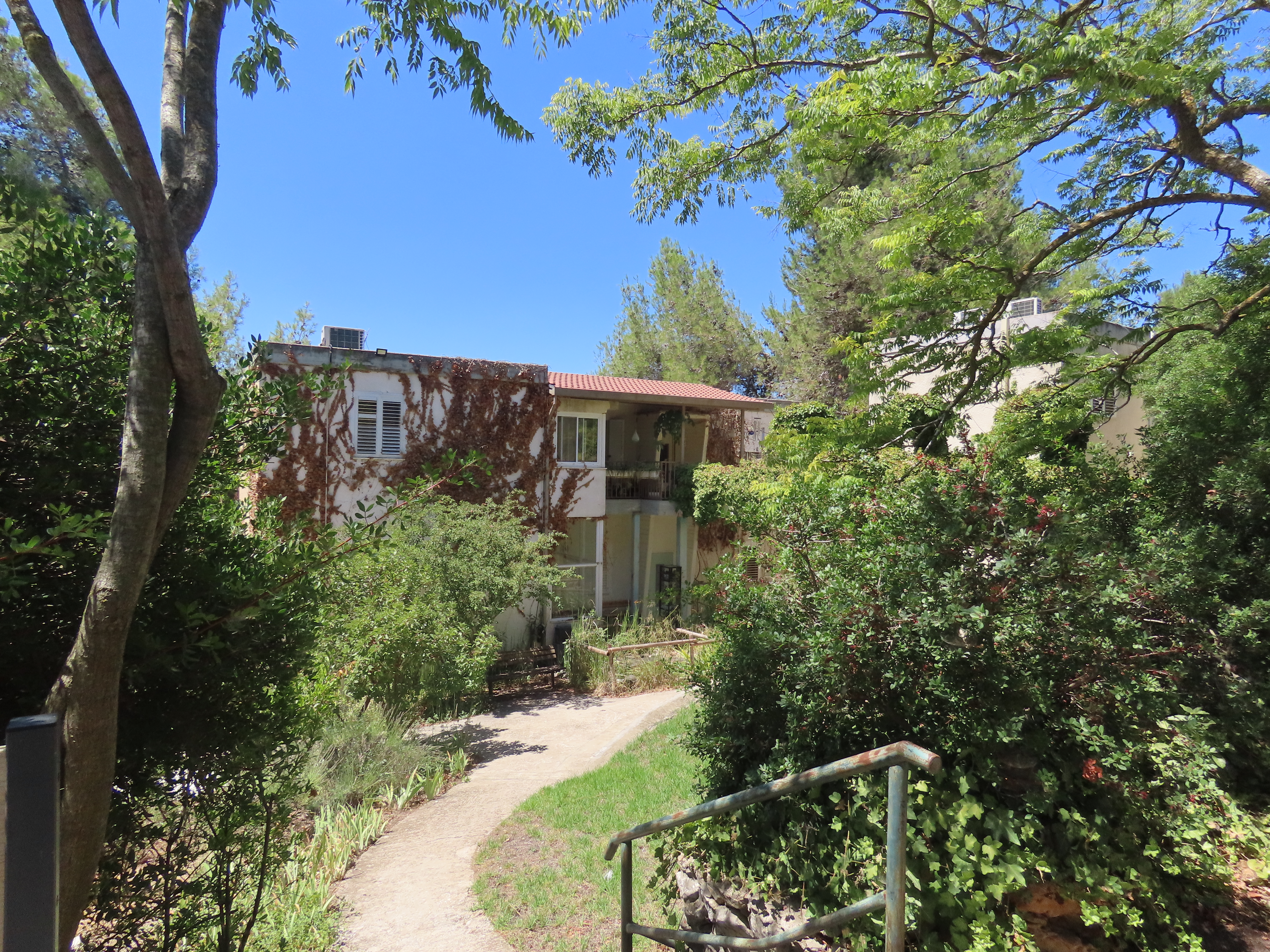
- Etymology: Son of the People
- Location within Northeast Israel Location within Israel
- Coordinates: 33°03′30″N 35°26′00″E
- Country: Israel
- District: Northern
- Subdistrict: Acre
- Council: Upper Galilee
- Affiliation: Kibbutz Movement
- Founded: 16 June 1949
- Founder: Demobilized Palmach soldiers
- Population (2024): 690
- Website: www.baram.org.il

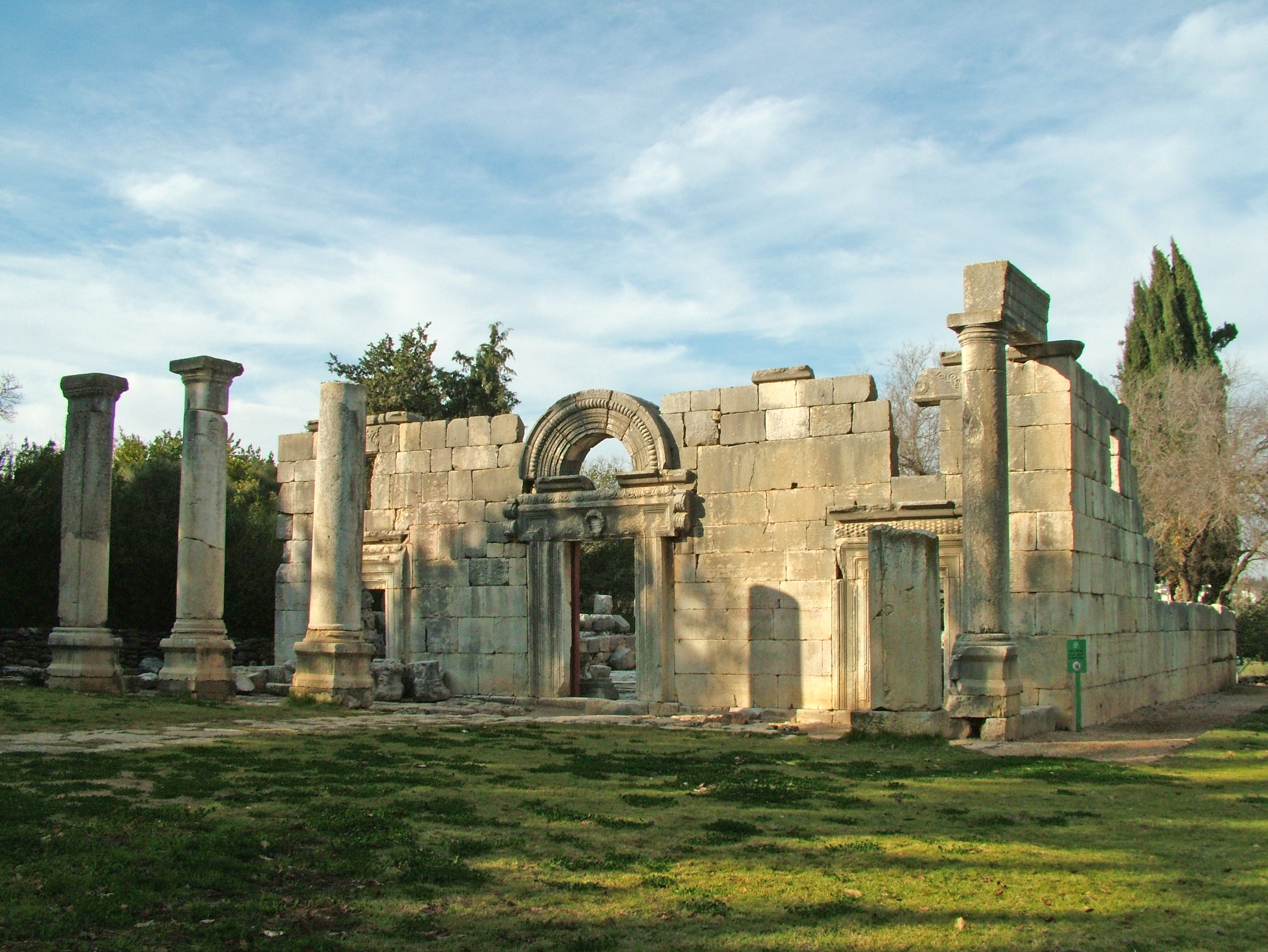
Ruins of the ancient synagogue at Kfar Bar'am

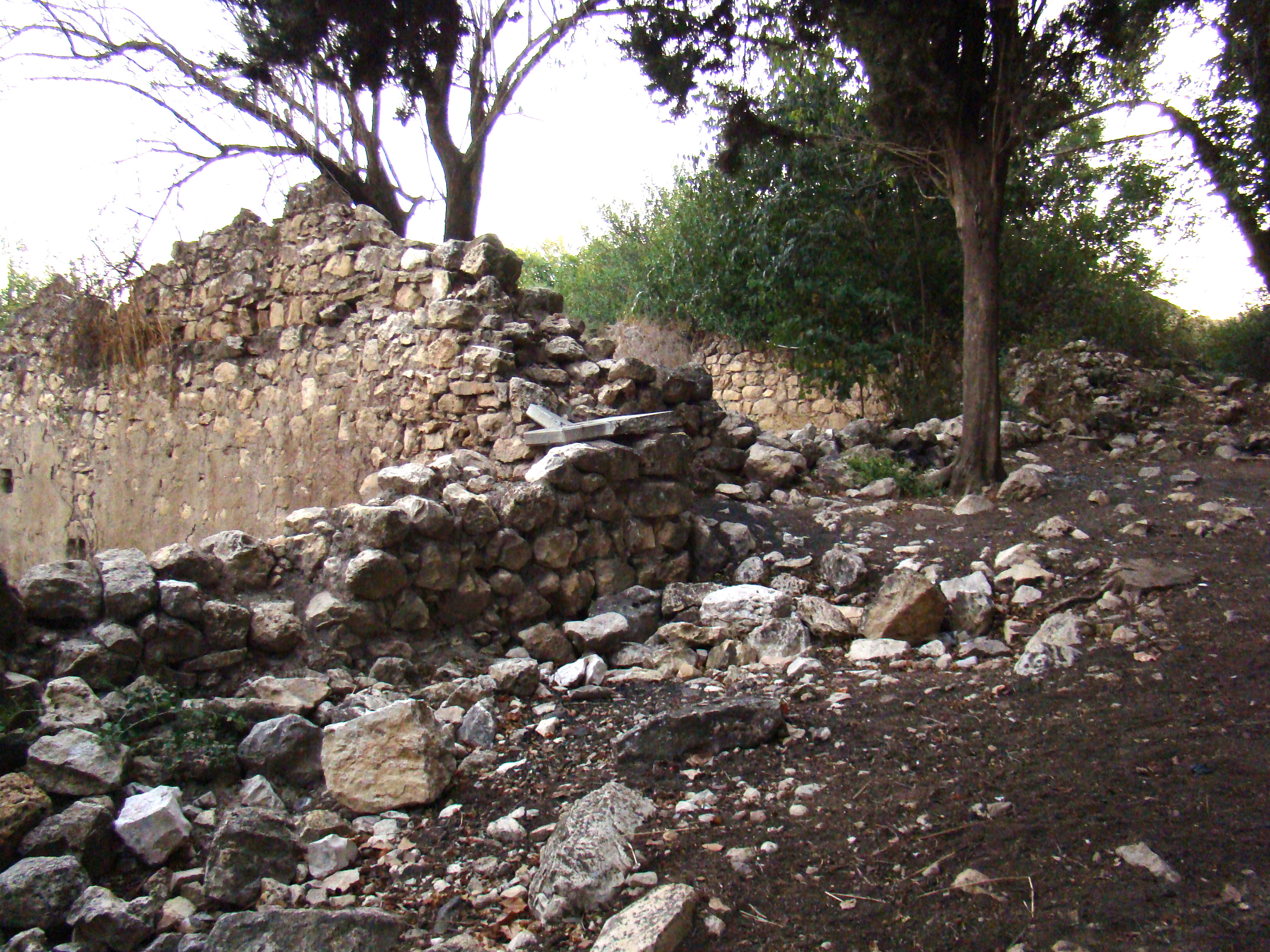
Ruins of the depopulated Maronite village

Bar'am (Hebrew: ברעם, lit. 'Son of the People') is a kibbutz in northern Israel. Located approximately 300 meters from Israel's border with Lebanon near the ruins of the ancient Jewish village of Kfar Bar'am. Bar'am National Park is known for the remains of one of Israel's oldest synagogues. The kibbutz falls under the jurisdiction of Upper Galilee Regional Council and had a population of 690 in 2024.

== History ==
The site of Bar'am has been inhabited by the Jews and their ancient ancestors the Israelites, since ancient times. The ancient Jewish village of Bar'am existed from the 3rd century BCE at its earliest with Jews maintaining a continuous presence in the village until sometime after the 13th century CE. The village and its Jewish population is referenced in several historic accounts, In 1210 CE, Rabbi Shmuel bar Shimshon wrote of two beautiful synagogues that were in use in the Village of Baram in Galilee. These synagogues still stand today, and on the window over the right hand entrance of the larger synagogue, there is an engraving in Aramaic which reads "Built by Elazar son of Yuden (or Yudan)". Later in 1210, Rabbi Yehiel of Paris recorded his visit to the village in his writings. However by 1522, the Italian Rabbi Moshe Basula writes of the Bar'am's apparent abandonment, as did Rabbi Moshe of Jerusalem in 1769. The Maronite Christians from Lebanon built their village atop the Jewish ruins on the site sometime in the 19th century. Their church stands on top of the hill opposite the large synagogue. the Jewish population left Kfar Bar'am, which became a mainly Christian village called Kafr Bir'im on the Lebanese border, which was bulldozed by Israel in 1949. The Christian Arab inhabitants of the town were evicted from their homes due to the Israel Defense Forces insistence that the border area with Lebanon be empty of Palestinians.

=== Kibbutz Bar'am ===
Modern Bar'am is a secular kibbutz established by members of the socialist Hashomer Hatzair movement on 14 June 1949 to guard and hold the border with Lebanon by demobilized Palmach soldiers. In the initial olive harvests, the kibbutz employed Palestinians who were displaced from Kafr Bir'im.

In 1995, the Israeli government established the Liba'i Commission, in part, to resolve claims of the displaced Kafr Bir'im residents. The Committee for the Uprooted of Kafr Bir'im presented a proposal for coexistence of a reconstructed village and the kibbutzim. While some Bar'am residents fully rejected the proposal, architect Deeb Maron and artist Hanna Farah-Kufer Bir'im expanded on the vision in their work.

Baram was the last kibbutz to dispense with the communal child rearing system that was once typical of kibbutzes in 1997, is looked upon by many as a sort of "nature reserve." A few kibbutzim have remained faithful to the original utopian ideology of everybody on the kibbutz being equal regardless of how long their tenure, and still provide three square meals a day in a communal dining room and hold general meetings to discuss and vote on important issues relating to Baram. Life in Bar'am centers around agriculture as well as tourism related to the nearby ancient synagogues and ruins, and the kibbutz has one of the largest volunteer programs.

Bar'am is one of the most popular kibbutzes for volunteers. Every Tuesday and Friday the kibbutzniks and volunteers can party at the local town pub. Volunteers hail from South Africa, Denmark, Sweden, the US, Japan, South Korea, Canada, Britain, Brazil, Columbia, Ecuador, Mexico and Burma.

In 2004, Zochrot began an initiative pairing Bar'am and displaced Kafr Bir'im residents to map possibilities of return and coexistence.

In 2006, during the Second Lebanon War, the kibbutz came under attack from Hezbollah forces and suffered heavy shelling and missile fire which damaged the agricultural fields. The kibbutz is located mere metres away from the Lebanese border, and the Hezbollah flag flying in front of homes across the border is a common sight. In July 2006, several Katyusha missiles exploded in nearby fields.

In the 2023 conflict between Hamas and Israel, Hezbollah targeted northern Israeli border communities, forcing evacuations, including in Bar'am.

On October 21, Hezbollah launched anti-tank fire towards Bar'am, resulting in the injury of three IDF soldiers, one of them in serious condition.

== Economy ==
The economy of Kibbutz Bar'am is centered around agriculture, as Bar'am is home to numerous orchards where a variety of fruits including apples, pears, nectarines, plums, kiwi, and Chinese gooseberries are grown and harvested. The fields are tended by Jewish volunteers who live on the kibbutz. Some of the volunteers are from Israel, while most of them are Jews from abroad from countries such as Mexico, Canada, Australia, Columbia, the USA, and more. The kibbutz is also home to a packing plant, where the fruit is sorted, packed and kept in cold storage until it is delivered to markets throughout Israel. Other crops include corn, peanuts and sunflower seeds. In addition, the kibbutz has ponds for fish farming. The kibbutz also has land holdings cultivated with cotton in the Hula Valley, near Ne'ot Mordehai.

The kibbutz also has a factory that manufactures plastics for medical purposes.

== Culture ==
Bar'am operates the Bar David Museum which houses bi-annual exhibitions from the large permanent collection of paintings and Jewish ritual objects, plus temporary exhibitions of fine art, sculpture and photography, and a small Archeology Room that exhibits objects from the region, such as ceramic and glass artefacts, jewellery and statuettes.

== See also ==
- Oldest synagogues in the world
- Nahal Bar'am

== Bibliography ==
- Khalidi, W. (1992). All That Remains: The Palestinian Villages Occupied and Depopulated by Israel in 1948. Washington D.C.: Institute for Palestine Studies. ISBN 0-88728-224-5.
- Morris, B. (2004). The Birth of the Palestinian Refugee Problem Revisited. Cambridge University Press. ISBN 978-0-521-00967-6.
