= Hanna Farah-Kufer Bir'im =

Palestinian visual artist, builder, and architect (born 1960)

Hanna Farah-Kufer Bir'im (Arabic: هانا فراح-كوفير بئرٍم; born 1960) or Hanna Fuad Farah, is an Israeli visual artist, builder, and architect. He lives in Tel Aviv-Yafo, and in the village of Bir'im.

== Early life and education ==
Hanna Farah was born in village of Alijiah in 1960, to an Arab family who displaced from Kafr Bir'im. He received a Bachelor of Science in 2001, and a bachelor of architecture in 2002 from WIZO Haifa Academy of Design and Education.

== Work ==
Many of his works, photograph, print and sculpture which deal with the history of the village and attempts to resettle it. He is an artist but, also engaged in architecture and design at the same time, between 1996 and 2008 he worked on the "New Kufer Bir'im" project, and designed the exhibition of Hila Lulu Lin at the Tel Aviv Museum of Art (2005).

The name of the Kufer Bir'im was added to his signature as a second family name, in order to tie his identity to the village of his family, whose residents were expelled from it in 1948. The affair of the displaced people of Akrit and Bir'im was discussed extensively in the government, the Supreme Court and the Knesset, but has not yet been implemented to fulfill the promise given to the residents that they will be able to return to their villages. The addition of the name symbolizes the "indivisible identity between his geographical and physical origins and his mental location."

=== Art career ===
Farah deals with the idea of the biography of the place as a distorted, irregular and detached narrative, which no retrospective look can reconstruct or correct. "Disrupted" (2003) series, in which he created a biographical mosaic of geographically disintegrated spaces that lies between the Kfar Bi’ram and the city of Tel Aviv-Yafo, where the Farah lives now.

In his co-operated work with artist Dina Shoham, Block (2002), the two artists appear in their work restraints, facing each other and building gray blocks, each around himself, like a fence or a wall that is rising around them. The two walls become two buildings that bury and imprison the artists. The background soundtrack of the work includes a conversation between the two artists who reflect on the Jewish-Arab and Israeli-Palestinian question as local narratives, so that the dissonance between the walls that are visible on the video and the relaxed conversation that is heard in the background is felt more strongly.

In the early photo work of a flower, there is a typical point of view: it is low, as foot-level of observer, trying to trace the place from which material and information were taken or to reveal hidden content or deviate from the agreed logic.

In later photographs, the perspective expanded - it embraces an outside or an inside of space, looking horizontally or diagonally, in a way that draws inspiration from the catalog or police photography genre.

In his solo exhibition "Concerns (חששות)" (2014), a flower presented as photographs taken randomly, documenting his daily life, events and scenes from the social and material environment in his life, thus forming a kind of personal visual biography of the artist.

In the exhibition, he brought photographs of different times and types together - a kind of re-activation of the works through cross-language cross-word making and a matchmaking of photographs placed side by side as an unresolved puzzle. Despite his meticulous aesthetics, Farah's works transverse categories and undermine the boundaries between media, bodywork and performance, conceptual documentation and photography.

Another feature of Farah's work is the cross-referencing between what is in the case and what is intentionally created. For example, in "Shelter 5-1" (2007), Farah was asked to take refuge in the building and prepare him for daily use. After the evacuation of the place and during its cleaning, one of the walls revealed the inscription "Palestine" apparently written by a Palestinian worker who was present at the site. In the framework of the work he painted the wall and painted it white while simultaneously documenting the process of doing all its stages.

As part of his temporary invitation to work for the exhibition (2007), he was asked to return and reveal the inscription on the wall. The study raises questions such as the issue of the labor force in Israel in general and especially in the field of construction, and the fact that it is impossible to disconnect the political from the public sphere.

=== Repairing model ===
Bar'am is a fundamental experience for Farah, he testified that "I often start out as a simple cube, reminiscent of my grandfather's house." In his work, "A Model for Repair" (2010), Farah builds Bar’am on its ruins by models, etchings, various actions, video works and photographs, creating an imagined space that simultaneously coexists as memory and dream and as an explicit and practical proposal for return. Farah 's move joins a long list of community, private, artistic and legal projects initiated and initiators by the people of Kfar Bar’am in order to fight the displacement of the village' s remains and promote to return to it.

In this work, Farah analyzes the remains of the historic village and proposes planning for the future development of the place, attesting to a certain utopian dimension in his work and his perception. In the first stage of the work - mapping - Farah observes British and Israeli aerial photographs made for intelligence and military purposes and extracts the movement of the village, as well as its continuation, from a statement that "I see a photograph of life, I see the life there was and the life that can be."

Later, from the aerial photographs and the testimonies he collected, Farah reconstructs the village structure - an intimate core of houses built close to each other, mostly around a common courtyard, with plots of land owned by the residents scattered around the village at different distances. In the model that he built for the future development of the village, he reconstructs the route of the village and the relationship between the buildings and the agricultural lands, and locates the future residential area around the historical village center, so that the remnants of the old village exist within and as part of the new village.

The agricultural lands and the industrial buildings appear in the model in the second and third circles around the built-up circle of the village. According to the proposal in the village nucleus it is suggested to place the community and cultural center of the new village. Despite the circumstances of the limiting reality, Farah's proposal marks a concrete possibility both for the construction of a village and for a political settlement in which refugees will return to the places from which they were ejected or to other places to which they would return.

== Prizes and awards ==
- 2007 – Prize to Encourage Creativity, The Ministry of Education, Culture and Sport
- 2003 – Pais Lottery grant for Kufer Birim Project

== Group exhibitions ==
- 2011 – Towards Return of Palestinian Refugees, Zochrot Gallery, Tel Aviv- Jaffa
- 2010– Stop Making Sense, Oslo, Oslo Kunstforening/Oslo Fine Art Society
- 2009 – For the tree of the field is man's life,
- 2009 – Espace culturel Memoire de I'Avenir, Paris
- 2009 – The Thousand and One Nights, Postmasters Gallery, NYC, NY
- 2009 – Landsc®ape: Representation Matrixes, Petach Tikva Museum of Art, Petach Tikva
- 2008 – Correspondence Contemporary Arab Artists, Revealing another Reality,
- 2008 – The Museum for Islamic Art, Jerusalem
- 2008 – The Jerusalem show, Al Ma'mal Foundation for Contemporary Art, Jerusalem
- 2008 – Prizes in Art and Design from the Ministry of Science' Culture and Sport, 2007,
- 2008 – Haifa Museum of Art
- 2007 – Temporally, The Israeli Center for Digital Art, Holon
- 2007 – Wanderings in the Print Space, The Print Workshop, Jerusalem
- 2007 – Desert Generation, The Kibbutz Art Gallery, Tel Aviv
- 2007 – See Not\ Fear Not, Umm el- Fahem Art Gallery, Umm el- Fahem
- 2006 – Bread, The Israel Museum, Jerusalem
- 2006 – Mini Israel, The Israel Museum, Jerusalem
- 2006 – Biographies, Six Solo Exhibitions, Hagar Art Gallery, Jaffa
- 2005 – Play- Ground, ‘Beit Hagefen’ The Arab-Jewish Center, Haifa
- 2004 – Utopia, ‘Beit Hagefen’ The Arab-Jewish Center, Haifa
- 2003 – Officespace: Art on Site 2, 16 Ha Arba’ah Street, Tel Aviv
- 2003 – Israeli Object - A Matter of Time, Artists’ House, Jerusalem; Science Museum, Haifa
- 2003 – Black/White, Beit Hagefen, Haifa; Artists’ House, Jerusalem; Science Museum, Haifa
- 2003 – The Situation Now - the book, 40 authors’ and artists’ perspective on the
- 2003 – current events in Israel, Kinneret Publication
- 2003 – Platform Against the War, Jaffa Cultural Center, Jaffa
- 2003 – Young Graduates/Veteran Graduates, The New Gallery, WIZO College of Design, Haifa
- 2001 – Improvisation, The Escola Design Gallery, Tel Aviv
- 2000 – Israeli Design, Ganei Hata’arucha [Exhibition Grounds], Tel Aviv
- 1998 – The Shadow, The Ministry of Culture and Education, Jerusalem
