= Kellman =

Kellman is a surname. Notable people with the surname include:

- Anthony Kellman (born 1955), Barbados-born poet, novelist, and musician
- Barnet Kellman, television and film director, television producer and film actor
- David Kellman, a triplet profiled in the 2018 documentary film, Three Identical Strangers
- Edith Kellman (1911–2007), noted American astronomer, worked on the Yerkes system of stellar classification
- Frank A. Kellman, politician in the State of Wisconsin
- Joel Kellman (born 1994), Swedish ice hockey player
- Joseph Kellman (1920–2010), American businessman and philanthropist
- León Kellman (1924–1981), Panamanian professional baseball player and manager
- Moshe Kelman member of the Palmach
- Norris J. Kellman, politician in the State of Wisconsin
- Peter Kellman (born 1945), anti-war activist, author, and American labor union leader
- Philip Kellman, Distinguished Professor of Psychology at University of California, Los Angeles
- Richard Kellman or Ricky Kelman, (born 1950), former child actor and young adult actor
- Steven G. Kellman (born 1947), American critic, academic and author

== See also ==
- Kellerman
- Kellermann
- Kelman
- Kjellman (disambiguation)
