= Kellermann =

Kellermann is a German surname. Notable people with the surname include:

- Arthur Kellermann (born 1955), American physician, epidemiologist and academic
- Barbara Kellermann (born 1959), a British actress, known for her film and television roles
- David Kellermann (1969–2007), Freddie Mac acting chief financial officer
- Ernie Kellermann (1943–2025), American National Football League player
- Ernst Walter Kellermann (1915–2012), German-British physicist
- François Christophe de Kellermann (1735–1820), 1st Duc de Valmy, one of Napoleon's officers, a Marshal of France
- François Christophe Edmond de Kellermann (1802–1868), 3rd Duc de Valmy, French politician, political historian and diplomat, son of François Étienne
- François Étienne de Kellermann (1770–1835), 2nd Duc de Valmy, French general in the Napoleonic Wars, son of François Christophe
- Georgine Kellermann (born 1957), German journalist
- Henry J. Kellermann (1910–1998), German-American lawyer and diplomat
- Kenneth Kellermann (born 1937), American astronomer
- Marcelle Kellermann (1919–2015), French-British writer and teacher, and a member of the French Resistance
- Matthew Kellermann (born 1971), United Kingdom politician
- Susan Kellermann (born 1944), American actress

== See also ==
- Kellerman
