= Taytaba =

Taytaba طيطبا Teitaba
- Etymology: "Watchtower"
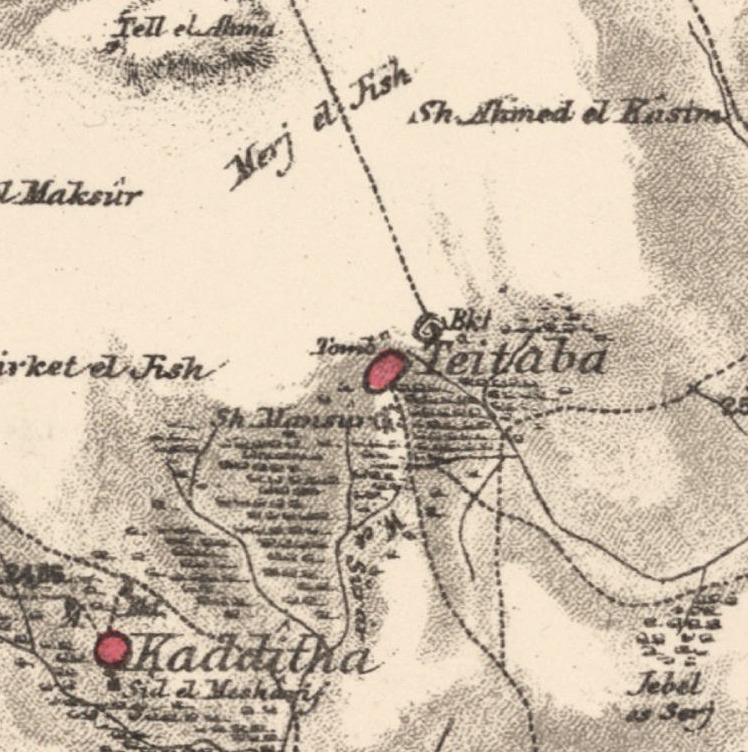
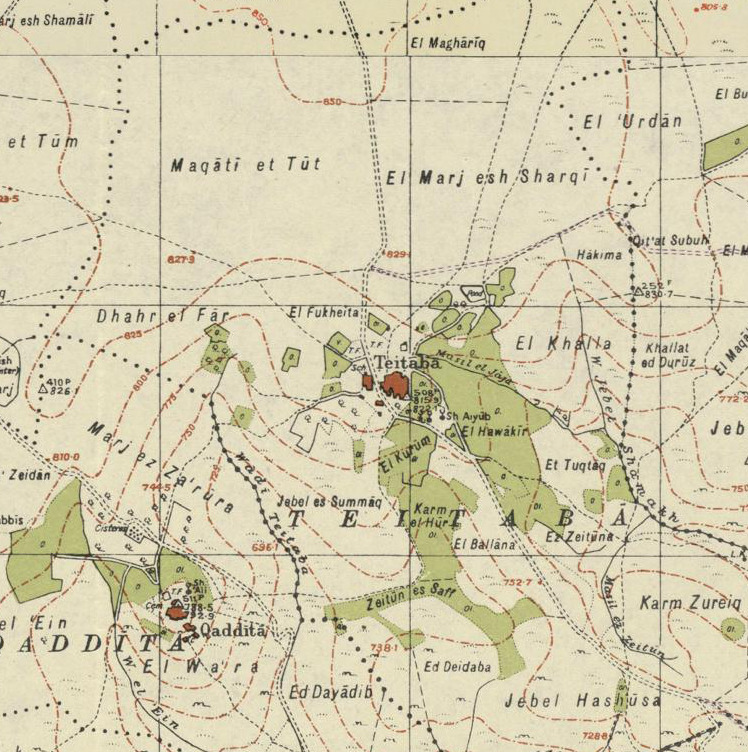
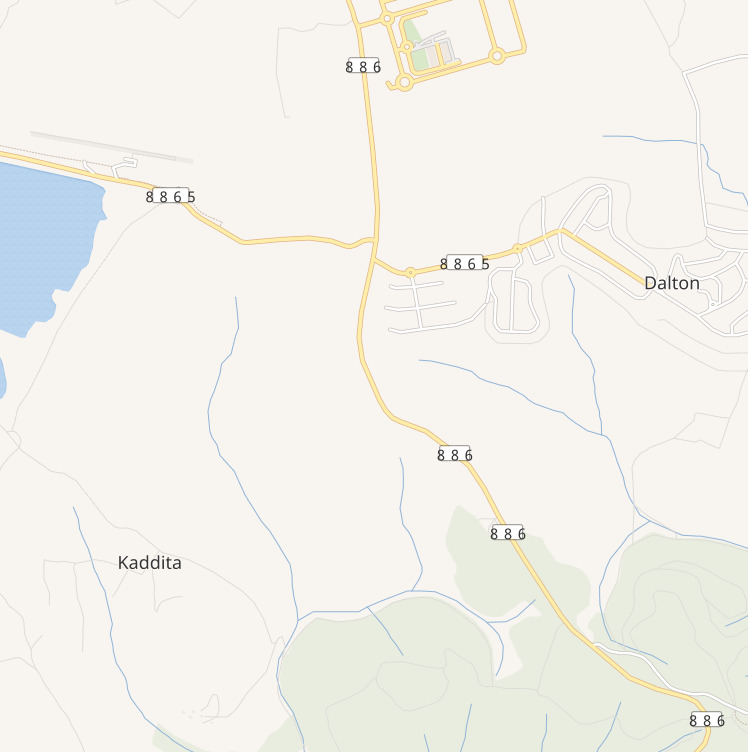
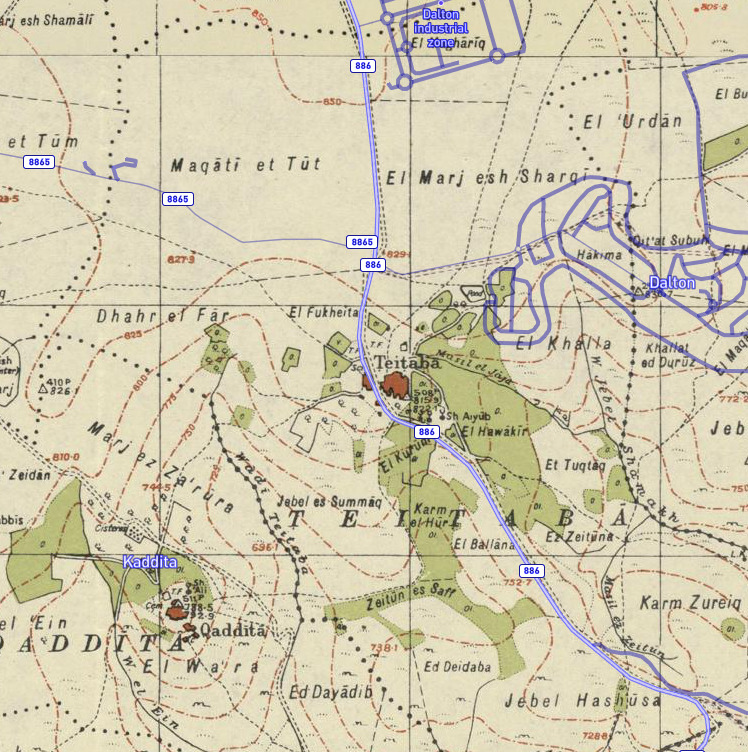
- 1870s map 1940s map modern map 1940s with modern overlay map A series of historical maps of the area around Taytaba (click the buttons)

- Location within Mandatory Palestine
- Coordinates: 33°00′48″N 35°28′35″E
- Palestine grid: 194/268
- Geopolitical entity: Mandatory Palestine
- Subdistrict: Safad
- Date of depopulation: May 1948

Area
  - Total: 8,453 dunams (8.453 km^{2}; 3.264 sq mi)

Population (1945)
  - Total: 530
- Cause(s) of depopulation: Fear of being caught up in the fighting
- Current Localities: None

Taytaba (Arabic: طيطبا, also spelled Teitaba) was a Palestinian-Arab village in the Safad Subdistrict, located 5 kilometers north of Safad. It was depopulated during the 1947–1948 Civil War in Mandatory Palestine in May 1948 under Operation Hiram. In 1945 it had a population of 530 and a total area of 8,453 dunams, 99.8% of which was Arab-owned.

It was situated in a rocky area located along the crest of a basaltic hill that overlooks Wadi Taytaba, a tributary of Wadi Waqqas, to the southeast. It was connected to a highway leading to Safad via a secondary road and connected to many of the surrounding villages through secondary roads as well.

== History ==
Taytaba has been suggested as the Biblical site where Elijah received his patronymic of "Tishbite".

=== Ottoman era ===
During the early Ottoman era in 1596, Taytaba was part of the nahiyah ("subdistrict") of Jira, part of Safad Sanjak, and paid taxes on goats and beehives, in addition to a fixed amount; a total of 5,220 akçe. It had a population of 73 households and 6 bachelors, an estimated 434 persons. All were Muslims.

In 1838, Robinson noted the village when he travelled in the region, as a village located in the Safad district.

Its population decreased to roughly 200, all Muslims, by the late Ottoman era when French explorer Victor Guérin visited in 1870. The houses were made of basalt and there was a plantation of figs. An Islamic shrine stood on a nearby hill, with blocks of basalt apparently carved by hand. At that time, Taytaba's inhabitants cultivated gardens to the west of the village site.

A population list from about 1887 showed Teitaba to have about 455 inhabitants; all Muslims.

=== British Mandate era ===
During the British Mandatory period in the early 20th-century, the houses of the village were built from stone and adobe brick. The inhabitants main source of income and sustenance was from agriculture. A mosque and a boys' elementary school (the latter was built during the British period) was located in the southern section of Taytaba.

In the 1922 census of Palestine Taitaba had a population of 269; all Muslim, increasing in the 1931 census to 364, still all Muslims, in a total of 60 houses.

In the 1945 statistics, its population was 530 Muslims, with a total of 8,453 dunams of land. 585 dunams were cultivated for orchards and 5,175 dunams for cereals; a total of 5,763 dunams were cultivable, while the built-up areas of the village amounted to 61 dunams.

=== 1948 War and aftermath ===
In February 1948 Taytaba reportedly hosted Arab volunteers participating in the 1948 Arab-Israeli War according to the New York Times. The newspaper stated that on 18 February a British Army patrol approaching Taytaba was attacked by Arab fighters prompting the dispatch of British reinforcements. British forces eventually withdrew and no casualties were reported. On 15 February a unit from the Haganah (precursor to the Israeli Army) attacked Taytaba following a mass killing they committed at the nearby Palestinian-Arab village of Sa'sa'. No details of the attack on Taytaba were mentioned the Associated Press report.

It is not known exactly when Taytaba was captured by Israel or emptied of its residents, but most likely fell in May during the later stages of the Israeli offensive Operation Yiftach. According to Palestinian historian Walid Khalidi, as such its residents probably evacuated or were expelled between the capture of Safad on 11 May or the end of the operation on 25 May. The Palestinian historian Nafez Nazzal contends that most of Taytaba's inhabitants left the village in early May as a result of the massacre at Ein al-Zeitun. Following the news of the massacre, many families fled to temporarily camp in the fields between the village and nearby Ras al-Ahmar. However, armed men remained in Taytaba until retreating after Jewish forces attacked in October.

In 1992 Khalidi noted about Taytaba: "The village site contains the stone rubble of razed houses. A few olive trees still stand, growing among the thorny plants and grass. Part of the surrounding land is used by the settlement of Dalton for agriculture and pastures; other parts are wooded."

== Archaeology ==
To the east of Taytaba lies the ruins (khirba) of al-Tasarif.

== Bibliography ==
- Barron, J.B., ed. (1923). Palestine: Report and General Abstracts of the Census of 1922. Government of Palestine.
- Conder, C.R.; Kitchener, H.H. (1881). The Survey of Western Palestine: memoirs of the topography, orography, hydrography, and archaeology. Vol. 1. London: Committee of the Palestine Exploration Fund.
- Department of Statistics (1945). Village Statistics, April, 1945. Government of Palestine.
- Esber, R. (2008). Under the Cover of War: The Zionist Expulsion of the Palestinians. Arabicus Books & Media. ISBN 978-0981513171.
- Guérin, V. (1880). Description Géographique Historique et Archéologique de la Palestine (in French). Vol. 3: Galilee, pt. 2. Paris: L'Imprimerie Nationale.
- Hadawi, S. (1970). Village Statistics of 1945: A Classification of Land and Area ownership in Palestine. Palestine Liberation Organization Research Center.
- Hütteroth, W.-D.; Abdulfattah, K. (1977). Historical Geography of Palestine, Transjordan and Southern Syria in the Late 16th Century. Erlanger Geographische Arbeiten, Sonderband 5. Erlangen, Germany: Vorstand der Fränkischen Geographischen Gesellschaft. ISBN 3-920405-41-2.
- Khalidi, W. (1992). All That Remains:The Palestinian Villages Occupied and Depopulated by Israel in 1948. Washington D.C.: Institute for Palestine Studies. ISBN 0-88728-224-5.
- Mills, E., ed. (1932). Census of Palestine 1931. Population of Villages, Towns and Administrative Areas. Jerusalem: Government of Palestine.
- Morris, B. (2004). The Birth of the Palestinian Refugee Problem Revisited. Cambridge University Press. ISBN 978-0-521-00967-6.
- Palmer, E.H. (1881). The Survey of Western Palestine: Arabic and English Name Lists Collected During the Survey by Lieutenants Conder and Kitchener, R. E. Transliterated and Explained by E.H. Palmer. Committee of the Palestine Exploration Fund.
- Rhode, H. (1979). Administration and Population of the Sancak of Safed in the Sixteenth Century (PhD). Columbia University. Archived from the original on 2020-03-01.
- Robinson, E.; Smith, E. (1841). Biblical Researches in Palestine, Mount Sinai and Arabia Petraea: A Journal of Travels in the year 1838. Vol. 3. Boston: Crocker & Brewster.
- Schumacher, G. (1888). "Population list of the Liwa of Akka". Quarterly Statement - Palestine Exploration Fund. 20: 169–191.
