= Sasa Software =

Israeli cybersecurity firm

- Type: Private
- Industry: Cybersecurity
- Founded: 2013
- Headquarters: Kibbutz Sasa, Upper Galilee, Israel
- Products: GateScanner
- Owner: Kibbutz Sasa
- Website: sasa-software.com

Sasa Software is an Israeli cybersecurity firm founded in 2013 and based in Kibbutz Sasa in the Upper Galilee region. It originated as a cybersecurity initiative within Plasan, a defense manufacturer owned by Kibbutz Sasa, and specializes in content disarm and reconstruction (CDR) technology that neutralizes file-based malware threats.

== History ==
Sasa Software's foundations trace back to the mid-2000s, when Plasan Sasa, the kibbutz’s armor and survivability company, was required to comply with strict U.S. Department of Defense IT security standards under International Traffic in Arms Regulations (ITAR) while supporting American military operations in Iraq. At the time, Plasan could not find an off-the-shelf software to meet these cybersecurity requirements, leading its IT team to develop an content filtering and sanitization system later named GateScanner. This system served as a buffer between Plasan's internal network and external data, disassembling incoming files and removing malicious code before allowing data through.

By 2013, Kibbutz Sasa established Sasa Software as an independent company. In June 2014, the kibbutz announced an investment of approximately US$5 million to expand Sasa Software’s operations. Around the same time, the kibbutz invested in a separate security firm, Safe-T, whose secure data exchange technology complemented Sasa Software’s services.

== Operations ==
Sasa Software is the developer of CDR platform, GateScanner. It was developed to preemptively neutralize malware in files and data streams without requiring prior detection or signatures. GateScanner acts as a secure content gateway by stripping embedded malicious code, converting file formats, and deeply scanning archives to ensure only sanitized data enters an organization’s network.
