= Sa'sa' massacre =

1948 killing of Palestinians by Israeli forces

Coordinates: 33°1′42.9″N 35°23′40.5″E

During the 1948 Palestine war, two massacres were perpetrated by Zionist forces in the Palestinian village of Sa'sa'. The first occurred on the night of 14-15 February 1948, when Palmach forces attacked the village killing approximately 60 people. (Note: Morris 2004 gives "the night of 15-16", but Benvenisti 2000, Pappé 2006, and Saleh Abdel Jawad all give Feb 14 or Feb 14-15) The second massacre occurred on 30 October 1948 when the village was conquered by the Israeli military as part of Operation Hiram.

== Background ==
One history of 1948 asserts that the reason for the attack was to restore Jewish public confidence in their fighting forces following the deaths of all the members of a platoon attempting to take supplies to Kfar Etzion a month previously.

According to Efraim Karsh, on January 20-21 some 400 armed Arab fighters from 2nd Yarmuk Regiment of Arab Liberation Army based in Sa'sa' carried out attacks on isolated kibbutz Yechiam in western Galilee.

Moshe Kelman was deputy commander of the attack on Al-Khisas of 18 December 1947.

== 14-15 February massacre ==
In February 1948, Yigal Allon, commander of the Palmach in the north, ordered an attack on Sa'sa'. The order was given to Moshe Kelman, the deputy commander of Third Battalion. The order read: "You have to blow up twenty houses and kill as many warriors as possible". According to Ilan Pappé, "warriors" should be read as "villagers" to properly understand the order.

On February 15, 1948, a Palmach unit entered the village during the night and, without resistance, planted explosives against some of the houses. It was reported at the time that ten or more houses were totally or partially destroyed and 11 villagers were killed (5 of them small children). According to the official history of the Haganah, the village had been used as a base for Arab fighters. However, press reports at the time cited by Khalidi belie this, since the Palmach units met "without opposition" in the village. Moshe Kelman himself wrote that "We left behind 35 demolished houses and 60–80 dead bodies", and historians estimate 60 people were killed and 16-20 houses demolished. (Note: Benny Morris, 1948: A History of the First Arab-Israeli War, 2008, "killing some sixty villagers and destroying twenty houses.")

== 30 October massacre ==
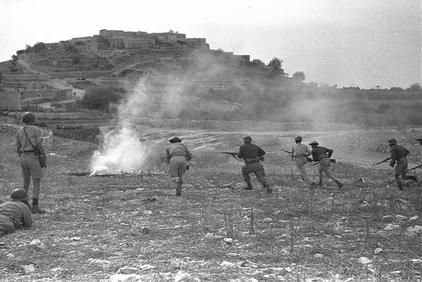
A Palmach unit attacks Sa'sa, October 1948

A second massacre occurred after the conquest of the village on 30 October during Operation Hiram. Historian Saleh Abdel Jawad writes that "many villagers" were killed. (Note: Jawad, S.A. (2007). Zionist Massacres: the Creation of the Palestinian Refugee Problem in the 1948 War. In: Benvenisti, E., Gans, C., Hanafi, S. (eds) Israel and the Palestinian Refugees. Beiträge zum ausländischen öffentlichen Recht und Völkerrecht, vol 189. Springer, Berlin, Heidelberg. https://doi.org/10.1007/978-3-540-68161-8_3. "30 October [...] Indiscriminate killings occur. Many villagers, including cripples, are massacred after the surrender of the village.") (Note: Khalidi 1992, "The second massacre was perpetrated on 30 October, at the time that the village was occupied, during Operation Hiram") Those villagers who had not already fled were expelled. Northern Command OC Moshe Carmel later reported that he had seen evidence of killings, and an official investigation by Major Emanuel Yalan suggested that some villagers, including some with disabilities, may have been killed after the village was occupied. However, the relevant Israeli files remain closed to historians.

"The History of the Haganah" by Ben-Zion Dinur described the attack as "one of the most daring raids into enemy territory."

== Aftermath ==
Currently, there are few remains of the Palestinian village of Sa'sa', with the exception of the village mosque, which has now been converted into the kibbutz cultural center.

In 1992, the Palestinian historian Walid Khalidi described the remains of the village: "Some of the old olive trees remain, and a number of walls and houses still stand. Some of the houses are presently used by kibbutz Sasa; one of them has an arched entrance and arched windows. A large portion of the surrounding land is forested, the rest is cultivated by Israeli farmers."

== See also ==
- Depopulated Palestinian locations in Israel
- Killings and massacres during the 1948 Palestine War

== Bibliography ==
- Barron, J.B., ed. (1923). Palestine: Report and General Abstracts of the Census of 1922. Government of Palestine.
- Berger, Uri (2017-10-16). "Sasa". Hadashot Arkheologiyot – Excavations and Surveys in Israel (129).
- Bron, Hendrik (Enno) (2006-12-10). "Sasa l Report". Hadashot Arkheologiyot – Excavations and Surveys in Israel (118).
- Bron, Hendrik (Enno) (2013-04-02). "Sasa, Final report l Report". Hadashot Arkheologiyot – Excavations and Surveys in Israel (125).
- Benvenisti, M. (2000). Sacred Landscape: The Buried History of the Holy Land Since 1948. Maxine Kaufman-Lacusta (translator). University of California Press. ISBN 0-520-92882-2.
- Cohen, Amnon (1973). Palestine in the Eighteenth Century: Patterns of Government and Administration. Jerusalem: Hebrew University. Cited in Petersen, (2001)
- Cohen, Amnon; Lewis, B. (1978). Population and Revenue in the Towns of Palestine in the Sixteenth Century. Princeton University Press. ISBN 0-691-09375-X.
- Conder, C.R.; Kitchener, H.H. (1881). The Survey of Western Palestine: Memoirs of the Topography, Orography, Hydrography, and Archaeology. Vol. 1. London: Committee of the Palestine Exploration Fund. (p. 256)
- Department of Statistics (1945). Village Statistics, April, 1945. Government of Palestine.
- Gibson, S and Braun, E. (1972) Sa'sa', HA, 63-64, pp 11–12 (in Hebrew). Cited in Petersen, 2002
- Guérin, V. (1880). Description Géographique Historique et Archéologique de la Palestine (in French). Vol. 3: Galilee, pt. 2. Paris: L'Imprimerie Nationale.
- Hadawi, S. (1970). Village Statistics of 1945: A Classification of Land and Area ownership in Palestine. Palestine Liberation Organization Research Center.
- Karsh, Efraim (2008). The Arab-Israeli Conflict: The 1948 War. The Rosen Publishing Group, Inc. ISBN 978-1404218420.
- Khalidi, W. (1992). All That Remains:The Palestinian Villages Occupied and Depopulated by Israel in 1948. Washington D.C.: Institute for Palestine Studies. ISBN 0-88728-224-5.
- Mills, E., ed. (1932). Census of Palestine 1931. Population of Villages, Towns and Administrative Areas. Jerusalem: Government of Palestine.
- Morris, B. (2004). The Birth of the Palestinian Refugee Problem Revisited. Cambridge University Press. ISBN 978-0-521-00967-6.
- Nazzal, Nafez (1978). The Palestinian Exodus from Galilee 1948. The Institute for Palestine Studies. (Sa'sa' pp. 46, 95)
- Palmer, E.H. (1881). The Survey of Western Palestine: Arabic and English Name Lists Collected During the Survey by Lieutenants Conder and Kitchener, R. E. Transliterated and Explained by E.H. Palmer. Committee of the Palestine Exploration Fund.
- Pappé, I. (2007). The ethnic cleansing of Palestine. (reprint). Oneworld Publications Limited. ISBN 978-1-78074-056-0.
- Petersen, Andrew (2001). A Gazetteer of Buildings in Muslim Palestine (British Academy Monographs in Archaeology). Vol. 1. Oxford University Press. ISBN 978-0-19-727011-0.
- Robinson, E.; Smith, E. (1841). Biblical Researches in Palestine, Mount Sinai and Arabia Petraea: A Journal of Travels in the year 1838. Vol. 3. Boston: Crocker & Brewster. (pp. 368-369)
- Schumacher, G. (1888). "Population list of the Liwa of Akka". Quarterly Statement - Palestine Exploration Fund. 20: 169–191.
- Smithline, Howard (1997). "Sasa, West l Report". Hadashot Arkheologiyot – Excavations and Surveys in Israel (16).
- Syon, Danny; Nagar, Yossi (2014-09-08). "Sasa, Final report l Report". Hadashot Arkheologiyot – Excavations and Surveys in Israel (126).
