= Ein al-Zeitun massacre =

1948 Israeli killing of Palestinian villagers

Coordinates: 32°59′14″N 35°29′30″E

- Part of the 1948 Palestine war and the Nakba
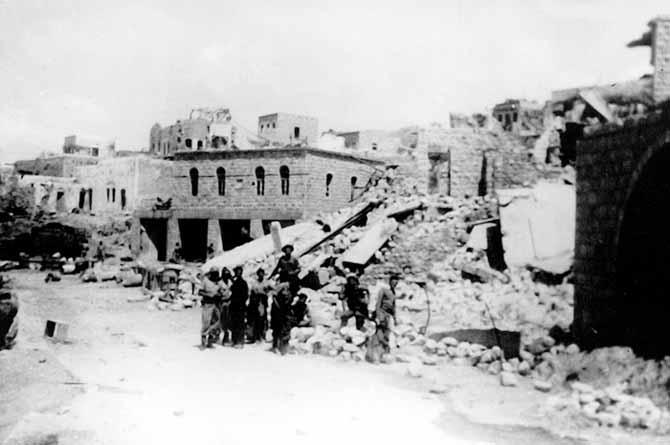
- Ein al-Zeitun after being captured by the Yiftach Brigade
- Location: Ein al Zeitun
- Date: May 1, 1948
- Deaths: 70+
- Victim: Palestinian villagers
- Perpetrator: Palmach: Moshe Kelman

The Ein al Zeitun (Note: Also spelled Ayn al-Zaytun) massacre occurred on May 1, 1948, during the 1948 Palestine war, when forces of the Palmach attacked the Palestinian village of Ein al-Zeitun, then part of the British Mandate for Palestine. 70+ villagers were killed in the attack. (Note: Abbasi 2004, "Morris records that, in the course of that vengeful raid, the Palmach forces were not satisfied with destroying the village; by order of Commander Kelman, they shot and killed seventy or so Arab prisoners") (Note: Pappé 2006, "How many of Ayn al-Zaytun’s villagers were actually executed is hard to tell. The military documents reported that all in all, including the executions, seventy people had been shot; other sources give a much higher number.")

== Background ==
Ein al Zeitun at this time was a Palestinian Arab village of about 800 inhabitants. It was believed by local Jews that Arabs from the village had taken part in a 1929 massacre of Jews in 1929 Palestine riots and the massacre is assumed to be as a point of revenge.

== Massacre ==
The attack on Ein al Zeitun was conducted by the 3rd Battalion of the Palmach under the command of Moshe Kelman, as a preliminary operation to prepare for an assault on the Arab quarter of Safed. Davidka mortar bombs were used for the first time. The village was taken without much difficulty. Most of the villagers fled during the battle, and the remainder, apart from 30 to 100 men aged 20-40 were forcibly expelled afterwards.

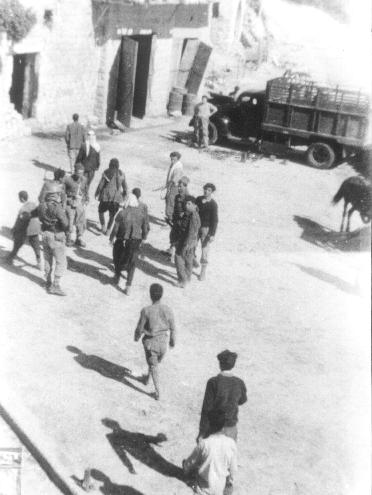
Israeli soldiers with prisoners in Ein al-Zeitun.

The Palmach soldiers then began to destroy the village. Palmach officer Elad Peled recalled that "our men began blowing up the village. The intoxication of victory blinded them and they went berserk, breaking and destroying property. The Jews of Safad saw Ein Zeitun blown up and crushed, and were 'happy', seeing in it vengeance for what the Arabs of Ein Zeitun carried out against the Jews of Safad and Ein Zeitim."

One Yiftah HQ report says that "30" Arab prisoners were "transferred to Golani [Brigade]". But a day or two later two Palmach soldiers, acting on Third Battalion OC Moshe Kelman's orders, murdered several dozen prisoners, probably including young men from Ein al-Zeitun, in the gully between Ein al-Zeitun and Safad. According to Netiva Ben-Yehuda, the captive men were tied up and thrown into the deep gully between Ein al Zeitun and left for two days. Kelman then decided to "get rid of this problem altogether" but most of his men refused. Finally, he found two willing to do it, and the prisoners were killed. Two days later, word of the massacre leaked out, and it was feared that British or UN investigators would arrive, so some soldiers, including Ben-Yehuda, were detailed to untie the corpses and bury them.

According to a testimony Aharon Yo'eli, a soldier present, obtained by Israeli historian Uri Milstein "2 Israelis came from Safad and took 23 men from Ayn Zaytoon, stripped them of watches and wallets, took them to a hill and shot them. Israelis were looking for other Israelis to kill Arabs; many Jews in Safad were Hassidis (strictly observant). Other Arabs were expelled towards Germak mountain".

== Aftermath ==
The Syrians subsequently charged that "women had been raped".

The destruction of Ein al Zeitun and the consequent massacre terrified the Arabs of Safed and probably contributed to their flight in the coming days.

Hans Lebrecht says he was ordered to build a temporary pump station and divert the village stream, Ayn Zaytun, to supply water to his battalion. The village had been destroyed, and among the debris there were many bodies. "In particular, we found many bodies of women, children and babies near the local mosque. I convinced the army to burn the bodies."

== See also ==
- Depopulated Palestinian locations in Israel
- Zionist political violence
