= Moshe Kelman =

Israeli military officer

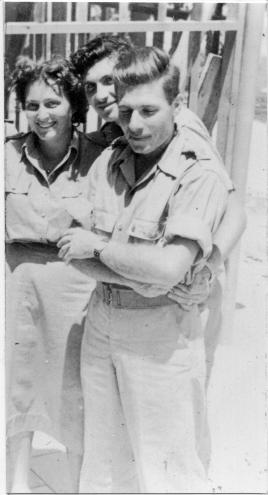
Moshe Kalman, Yiftach Brigade 3rd Battalion commander, "The Wolf". From the Palmach archive

Moshe Kelman (Hebrew: משה קלמן; 2 September 1923 – 19 December 1980) was an Israeli military officer. As the commander of the Palmach's 3rd Battalion, he played a key role in the conquest of the city of Safed in 1948. According to the testimony of numerous fellow soldiers, Kelman was responsible for ordering the Ein al-Zeitun massacre. He was also a key participant in the Palestinian expulsion from Lydda and Ramle.

== Biography ==
Kelman was born in Mazkeret Batya and was raised in Ness Ziona, Rehovot, and Ramat HaSharon. He joined the Haganah at age 15. In 1940 he moved to Ein Harod and joined the Palmach the following year. He became an officer in the Palmach.

In early 1947, Kelman was ordered by the Haganah to supervise the execution and burial of a Jew accused of collaborating with the British. The execution took place at Kibbutz Dafna.

=== 1947-1949 Palestine war ===
With the outbreak of the 1947-48 Civil War in Mandatory Palestine, Kelman was a senior member of the Palmach. Kelman led the Al-Khisas raid (also known as the Al-Khisas massacre) on 18 December 1947. When a woman member of the Palmach refused to throw a grenade into a room in which she could hear a child crying, Kelman argued that women should not be used on front line duties but should be used as "cooks and service people."

On 15 February 1948, Kelman led a force of 60 men which attacked the Arab village of Sa'sa' in the Upper Galilee, perpetrating the Sa'sa' massacre which killed approximately sixty Palestinians and destroyed a number of houses. The operation coincided with a number of other attacks on Arab targets. Its intention was to demonstrate that no village was beyond the reach of the Haganah and to restore Jewish public morale following the deaths of 35 members of the Haganah attempting to reach the outpost of Kfar Etzion a month previously. According to the Haganah's official history, the village was a base for Arab fighters. Kelman had orders to "blow up twenty houses and kill the largest possible number of fighters." During the nighttime attack ten houses where destroyed or damaged and "tens" of people killed. Kelman is quoted as saying 35 houses were demolished and 60 - 80 killed.

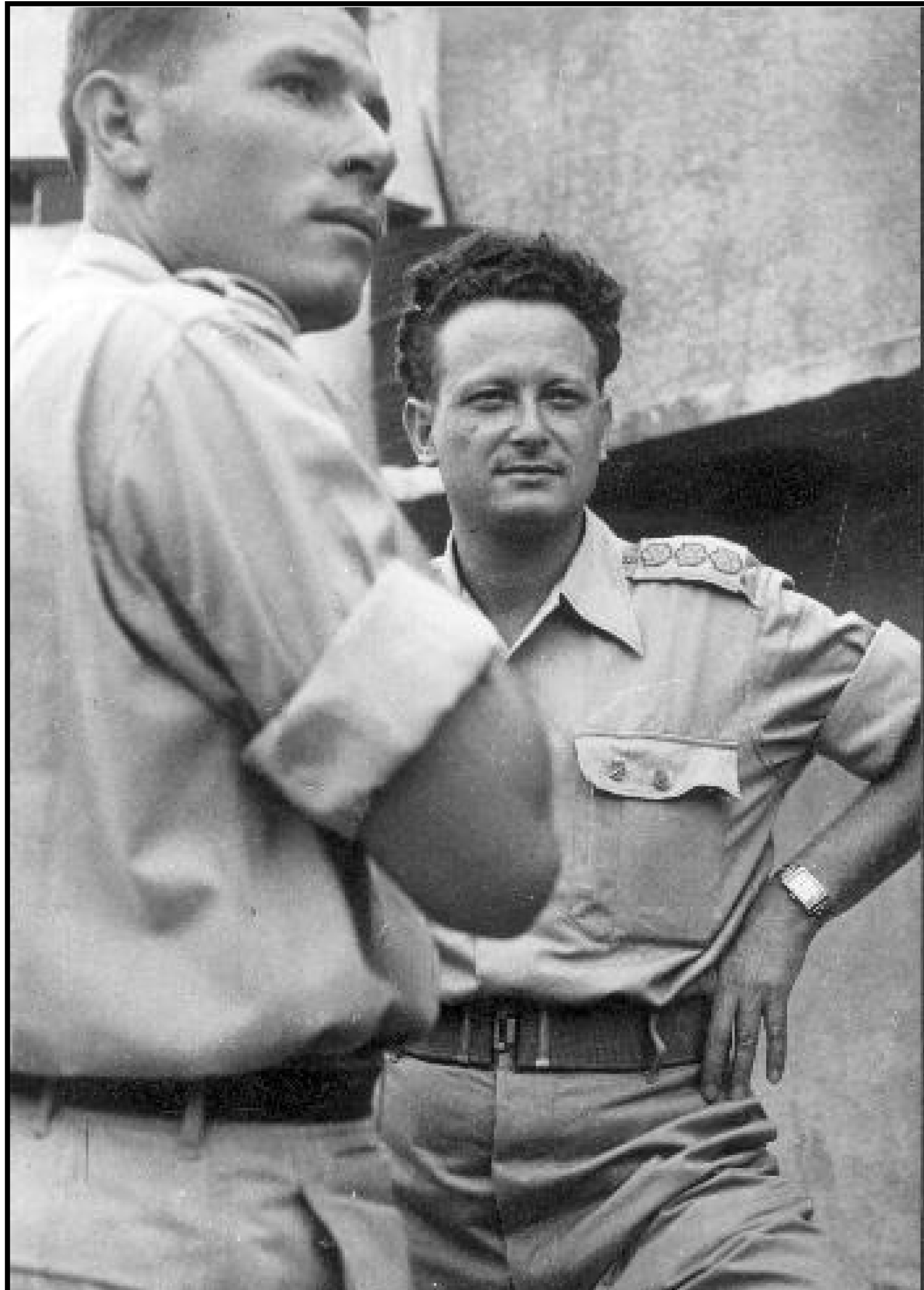
Moshe Kelman (left) with Yigal Allon, 1948.

In April 1948, he became operational commander of the Palmach's Third Battalion.

On 1 May, he commanded the 3rd Battalion's attack on Ein al-Zeitun as part of Operation Yiftach. Two or three days later, Kelman ordered the shooting of "70 or so" Arab prisoners in a gully close to Safed, many of them young men taken prisoner at Ein al-Zeitun. According to a female member of the Palmach, Netiva Ben-Yehuda, the captive men were tied up and thrown into the deep gully between Ein al Zeitun and left for two days. Kelman then decided to "get rid of this problem altogether" but most of his men refused. Finally, he found two willing to do it, and the prisoners were killed. Two days later, word of the massacre leaked out, and it was feared that British or UN investigators would arrive, so some soldiers, including Ben-Yehuda, were detailed to untie the corpses and bury them. Afterwards, Netiva Ben-Yehuda, was ordered, with others, to the untie ropes from the dead when it was feared that the bodies might be discovered by members of the Red Cross who were visiting the area. Ilan Pappe states that one of the reasons for this and "many other mass killings" was that the Haganah did not have facilities for large numbers of prisoners.

On 6 May, Kelman led the first attack on Safed but his troops failed to capture the town. The second attack on May 10th proved to be successful.

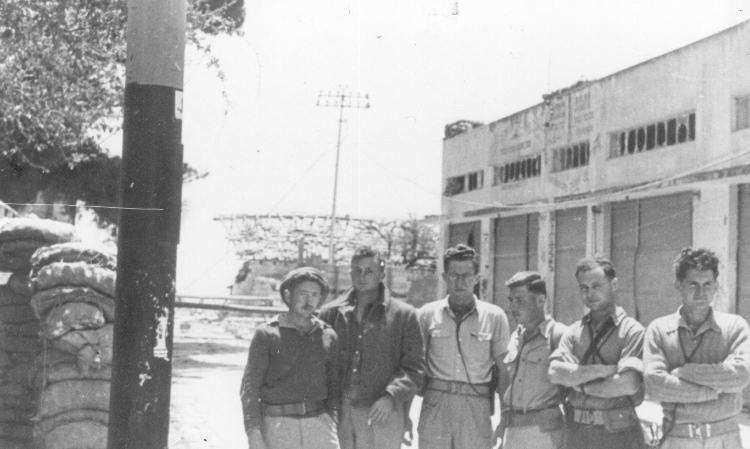
Yiftach Brigade commanders in Safed, 1948. Elad Peled with glasses. Moshe Kelman to his left.

On 8 June 1948, during one of the unsuccessful attacks on Latrun, Kelman led three companies and was forced to retreat under fire. He also commanded troops rounding up members of the Irgun in Tel Aviv during the Altalena revolt.

On 12 July 1948, during Operation Danny, Kelman was in command of the 3rd Battalion in Lydda. After an outbreak of gunfire his troops were ordered to shoot at "any clear target" and at anyone "seen on the streets". In two and a half hours "some 250" people were killed "and many wounded." Kelman subsequently transferred to the Negev Brigade and took part in Operation Yoav.

=== After the 1947-49 war ===
Kelman remained in the army until 1951, eventually reaching the rank of Aluf Mishne, equivalent to Colonel. He then went to the United States to study economics and industrial engineering at Columbia University. After completing a BA, he returned to Israel, where he worked as an investment consultant and in the design and construction of factories and industrial zones. Kalman died of cancer in 1980.
