= The Mad Death =

- No. of episodes: 3

Release
- Original network: BBC1
- Original release: 16 July – 30 July 1983

The Mad Death is a television serial made by BBC Scotland. It was filmed in 1981 and transmitted 2 years later in 1983.

== Plot ==
The three-part series examined the effects of an outbreak of rabies in the United Kingdom and was noted for its occasionally chilling content.

== Production ==
The music for the opening titles consisted of a voice whispering the first four lines of All Things Bright and Beautiful over a montage of animals' faces, distorted by a rippling water effect, symbolising the hydrophobia caused by rabies.

The episodes were filmed around Scotland including inside East Kilbride Shopping Centre.

The series has only ever been repeated once on BBC television, in 1985, although it was later shown on UK Gold in the 1990s. An edited version was made to film length and released on a VHS in the mid-1980s. It was released uncut on DVD on 7 May 2018.

== Cast ==
- Richard Heffer as Michael Hilliard
- Barbara Kellerman as Dr. Ann Maitland
- Richard Morant as Johnny Dalry
- Ed Bishop as Tom Siegler
- Valerie Holliman as Norma Siegler
- Debbi Blythe as Jane Stoddard
- Brenda Bruce as Miss Stonecroft
- Jimmy Logan as Bill Stanton
- Paul Brooke as Bob Nicol

== Releases ==
The Mad Death was released on DVD in 2018 by Simply Media.
