= Kellerman =

Kellerman is a surname. Notable people with the surname include:

- Adam Kellerman (born 1990), Australian wheelchair tennis player
- Annette Kellerman (1887–1975), Australian swimmer, vaudeville star, film actress and writer
- Barbara Kellerman (born 1949), English actress
- Barbara Kellerman (academic), professor of public leadership at Harvard University's John F. Kennedy School of Government
- Brian Kellerman (born c. 1961), American basketball player
- Faye Kellerman (born 1952), American novelist
- François Christophe de Kellermann (1735–1820), French military commander (father, known as Kellermann)
- François Étienne de Kellermann (1770–1835), French cavalry general (son, also known as Kellermann)
- Ivy Kellerman
- Jonathan Kellerman (born 1949), American psychologist and novelist
- Martin Kellerman (born 1973), Swedish cartoonist
- Max Kellerman (born 1973), American boxing commentator and sports talk radio host
- Roy Kellerman (1915–1984), US Secret Service Agent on duty when President John F. Kennedy was assassinated
- Sally Kellerman (1937–2022), American actress
- William Ashbrook Kellerman (1850–1908), U.S. botanist, mycologist and photographer
- Wouter Kellerman (born 1961), South African flautist and music composer

Fictional characters:

- Mike Kellerman, character in the television series Homicide: Life on the Street
- Max Kellerman, owner of Kellerman's Catskills resort in the 1987 film Dirty Dancing
- Paul Kellerman, character in the television series Prison Break

== See also ==
- Kellermann
