= Kelman =

Kelman is a surname. Notable people with the surname include:

- Alfred R. Kelman (born 1936), American film and television documentary producer and director
- Ari Kelman (born 1968), Chancellor’s Leadership Professor of History at University of California, Davis
- Charles Kelman (1930–2004), ophthalmologist and a pioneer in cataract surgery
- Charlie Kelman (born 2001), American professional soccer player
- Emile Kelman, record producer and audio engineer
- Herbert Kelman, the Richard Clarke Cabot Professor of Social Ethics, Emeritus at Harvard University
- James Kelman (born 1946), influential writer of novels, short stories, plays and political essays
- John Kelman (born 1968), Barbadian boxer
- Mark Kelman (born 1951), jurist and vice dean of Stanford Law School
- Moshe Kelman, the operational commander of the Palmach's Third Battalion in 1948
- Naamah Kelman (born 1955), American-born Rabbi, Dean of the Hebrew Union College-Jewish Institute of Religion campus
- Nic Kelman (born 1971), writer of novels, short stories, non-fiction, screenplays, and essays
- Pat Kelman, British director, writer and actor
- Peggy Kelman, Australian pioneer aviator
- Ricky Kelman (born 1950), American actor
- Scott Kelman (born 1981), Canadian ice hockey player
- Stephen Kelman, English novelist, whose debut novel Pigeon English was a shortlisted nominee for the 2011 Man Booker Prize
- Thomas Kelman Fleming, CVO OBE FRSAMD (1927–2010), Scottish actor, director, poet, television and radio commentator for the BBC
- Todd Kelman (born 1975), retired Canadian ice hockey defenceman
- Wolfe Kelman (1923–1990), Austrian-born American Rabbi and leader in the Conservative Judaism in the United States
