= Kjellman =

Kjellman may refer to:

- Cape Kjellman, a cape marking the east side of the entrance to Charcot Bay
- Kjellman machine gun, a machine gun produced in Sweden

People

- Björn Kjellman (born 1963), Swedish actor and singer
- Frans Reinhold Kjellman (1846-1907), Swedish botanist who specialized in marine phycology
- Kristen Kjellman (born 1984), American lacrosse player
