= Henry J. Kellermann =

Henry (Heinz) Joseph Kellermann (January 12, 1910 – May 12, 1998) was a German-American lawyer and diplomat.

== Life ==
Heinz Kellermann was the son of Rabbi and school principal Benzion Kellermann and Thekla Lehmann (1876–1964). His brother Ernst Walter Kellermann, born in 1915, became a physicist. As a teenager, he became a member of the Jewish-Liberal Youth Association in 1926 and in 1928, head of the Working Group of Jewish-Liberal Youth Associations. Beginning in 1928, he studied law in Berlin, Freiburg, and Heidelberg, and began his legal clerkship in 1932. Starting in the same year, he served on the editorial board of the "CV-Zeitung" and the Jewish Liberal Newspaper. He also worked at a law firm in Berlin. After the Nazis came to power in 1933, he was barred from practicing law because he was Jewish. In 1935, he published a manifesto in the "German-Jewish Way" series of the German Vanguard. In 1935–36, he studied at the College for the Study of Judaism and was a member of the Gross Breesen Working Committee. He earned his doctorate in 1937 under Eduard Kohlrausch and Karl Klee at the University of Berlin and then emigrated to the United States, where he studied at Columbia University’s School of Social Work on a scholarship from the Baltimore Jewish community. In 1938, he married Mignon Lunt Pauli, a teacher, in New York; they had three children, including the actress Susan Kellermann, who was born in London in 1944. In 1941, he obtained American citizenship.

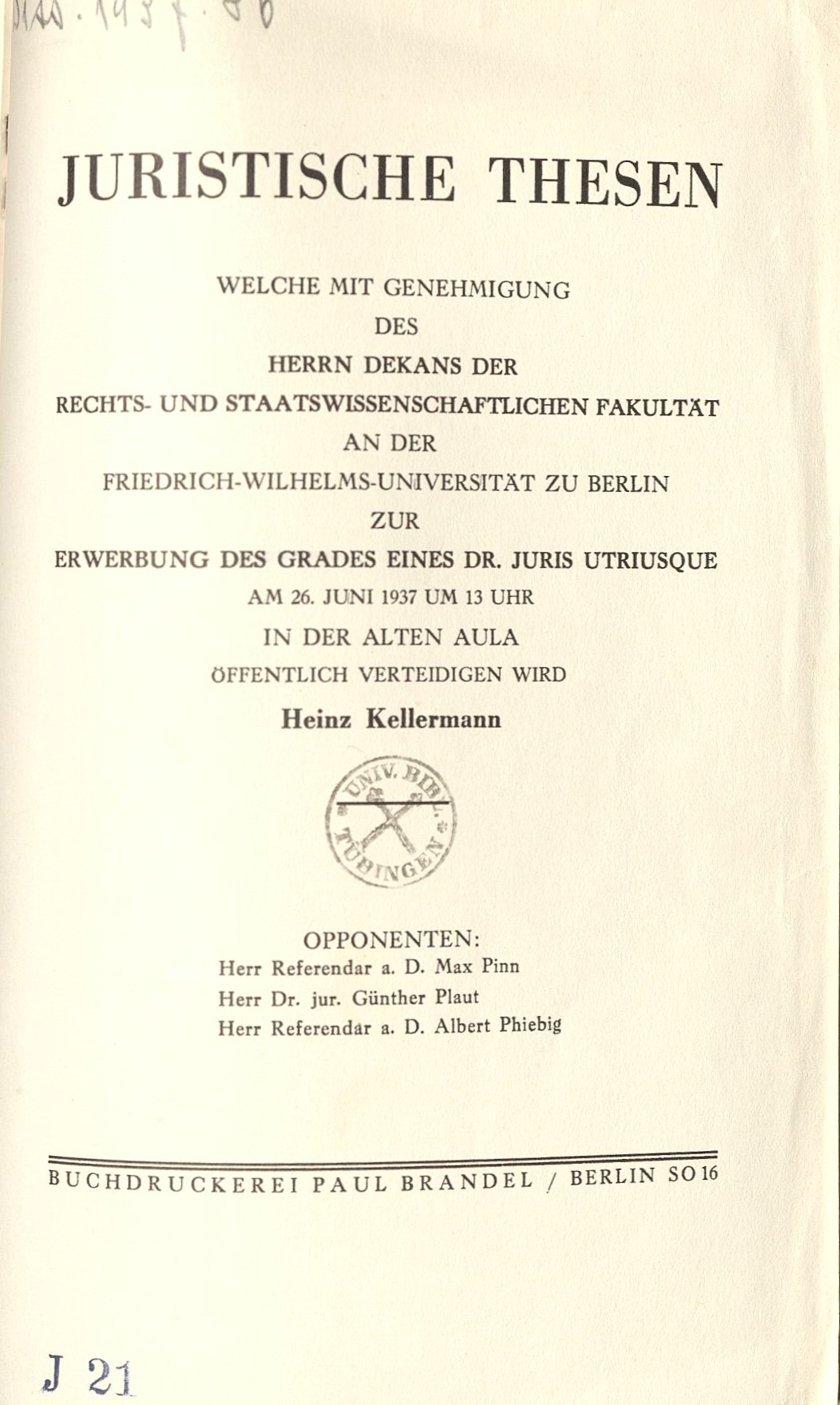
Juristische Thesen Berlin 1937

Henry J. Kellermann worked for the National Refugee Service, then for the Foreign Broadcast Information Service beginning in 1942, and for the Office of Strategic Services (OSS) beginning in 1944. In 1945 it assigned him to the International Military Tribunal (IMT) in occupied Germany, where he gathered evidence and conducted interrogations. Kellermann became a civil servant at the State Department in 1946 and spent the next few years dealing with German issues such as reeducation. He served as a representative to UNESCO in Paris from 1956 to 1961 and as chargé d'affaires in Switzerland from 1961 to 1966.

After his retirement in 1970, he served as an advisor on international environmental law to the National Academy of Sciences and, in the early 1980s, lectured on international environmental protection issues at Georgetown University’s School of Foreign Service. Kellermann received the Superior Honor Award from the State Department and the Grand Cross of the Order of Merit of the Federal Republic of Germany. He spent his final years in Chevy Chase, Maryland.

== Selected Publications ==
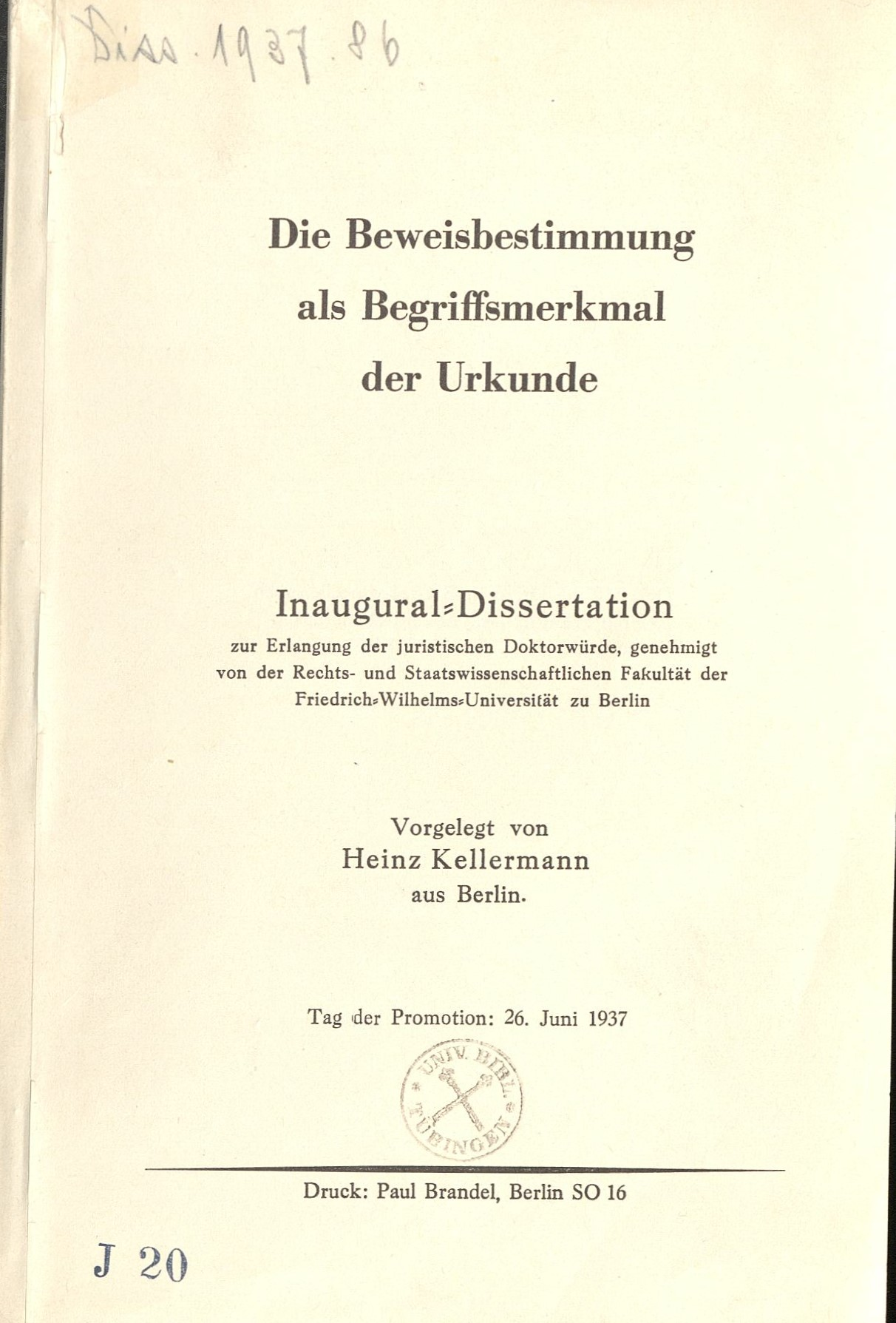
Dissertation 1937

- Der „Bund“. In: Wille und Weg des deutschen Judentums. Berlin: Vortrupp, 1935, pp. 30–45
- Die Beweisbestimmung als Begriffsmerkmal der Urkunde. Berlin : Brandel, 1937
- The present status of German youth. Washington: U.S. Govt. Print. Off., 1946
- Cultural relations as an instrument of U.S. foreign policy : the educational exchange program between the United States and Germany, 1945–1954. Washington: Government Print. Office, 1978.
- From imperial to national-socialist Germany : recollections of a German-Jewish youth leader, in: The Leo Baeck Institute Year Book 39 (1994), S. 305–330.
- Settling accounts - the Nuremberg Trial, in: The Leo Baeck Institute Year Book 42 (1997), S. 337–356.
