= Kjellman machine gun =

- Type: Machine gun
- Place of origin: Sweden

Service history
- In service: Sweden
- Used by: Swedish Army

Production history
- Designer: D.H. Friberg/Rudolf Henrik Kjellman
- Designed: 1870-1907

Specifications
- Cartridge: 6.5×55mm
- Caliber: 6.5 mm
- Action: Recoil operated, cam-locked bolt
- Feed system: Hopper Belt Magazine
- Sights: Iron

The Kjellman LMG was a machine gun produced in Sweden. It is notable for being one of the first automatic weapons ever conceived (if not produced) and one of the first light machine guns as well.

Although the patent dated back to 1870, and prototypes may have existed at least a half a decade before the Maxim was invented, black powder ammunition made the weapon virtually unusable due to rapid residue build up. The weapon was the brainchild of a Lieutenant D.H. Friberg, and was later modified by (and acquired its namesake from) Rudolf Henrik Kjellman, who in 1907, adapted the system to fire smokeless cartridges. Although boasting a reliable and secure breech-locking mechanism (similar to the Russian DP-27), the weapon was prohibitively expensive to manufacture, and only ten were ever made.

== External Image ==
- Kjellman LMG
