= Marcelle Kellermann =

French writer

Marcelle Georgine Kellermann (c.1919 – 6 June 2015) was a French writer and teacher, and a member of the French Resistance during the Second World War.

Kellermann was born in Paris and was studying at the University of Clermont-Ferrand when she left her studies to join the Resistance in 1942. She married Ernst Walter Kellermann, a German Jew whom she met in Paris. Walter became an academic in the UK, where the couple made their home. They had a son and two daughters, one of whom is the actress Barbara Kellerman.

Marcelle Kellermann became a teacher of modern languages in Leeds and at Bingley College of Education in Yorkshire. Her articles on the subject of language teaching included "Two experiments on language teaching in primary schools in Leeds", published by the Nuffield Foundation in 1964. Her monograph in Pergamon Press's Language Teaching Methodology series, The Forgotten Third Skill: Reading a Foreign Language, was published in 1981. She was said to have "pioneered the teaching of French to primary school children".

Later, the couple retired to London, and she wrote a book about her wartime experiences, A Packhorse Called Rachel, published in 2007 by Grosvenor House. The Interpreter, published by CreateSpace in 2014, resulted from her research into the activities of a Nazi officer, "Frank von Heugen", who used his language skills to become an Allied informer.
