= Sa'sa', Palestine =

Sa'sa' سعسع
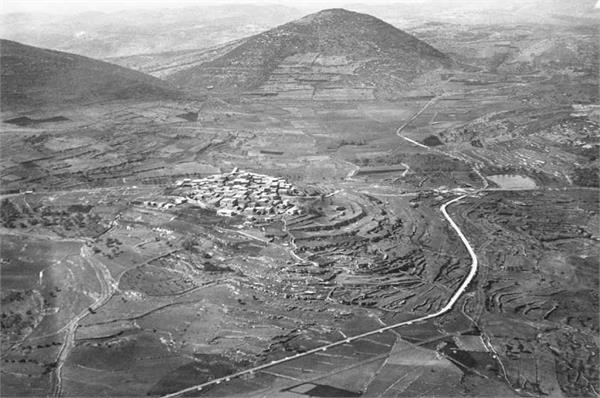
- Sa'sa', 1939
- Etymology: from personal name
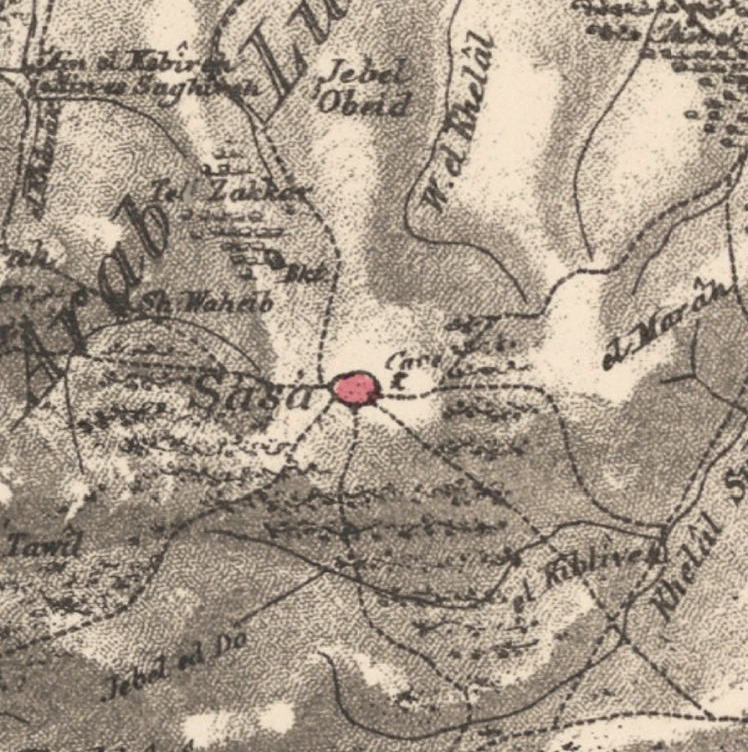
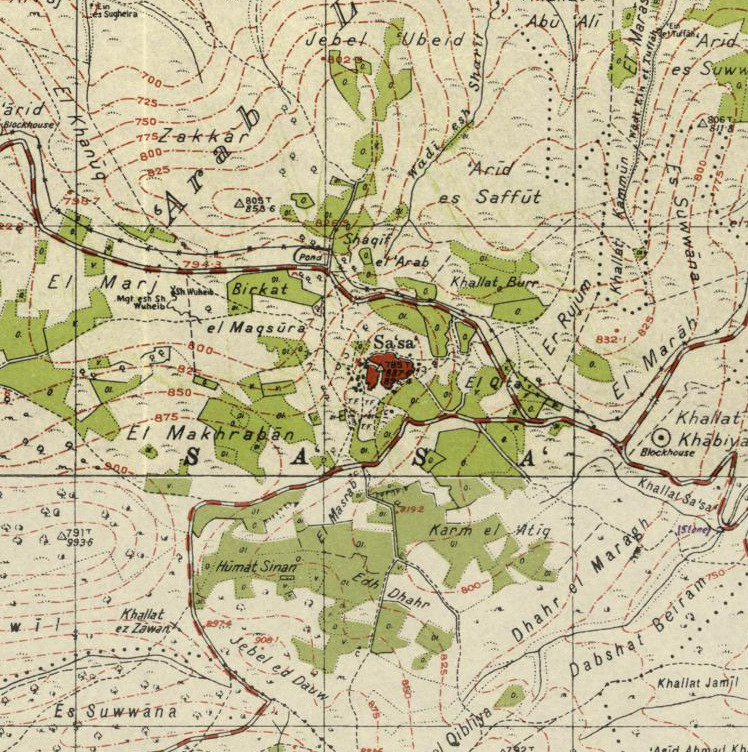
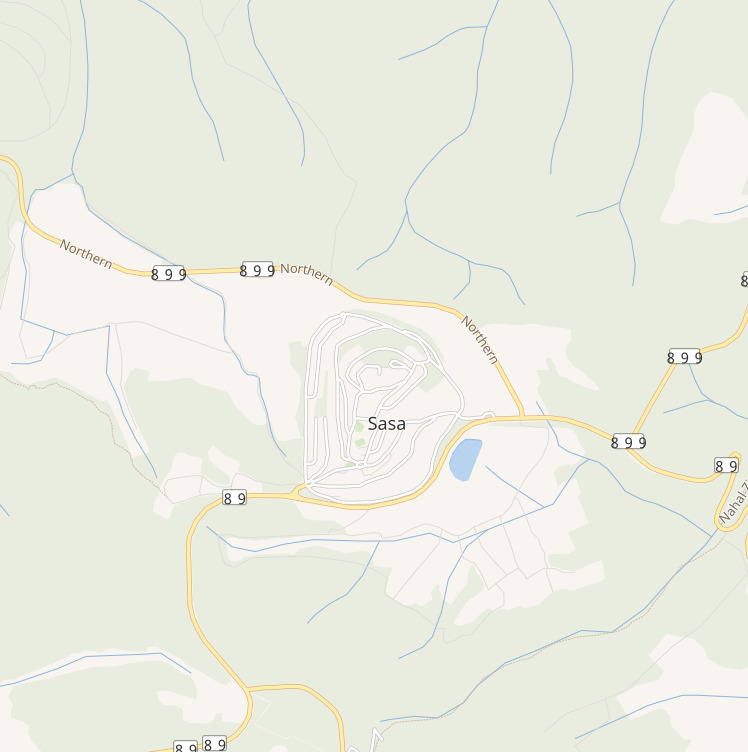
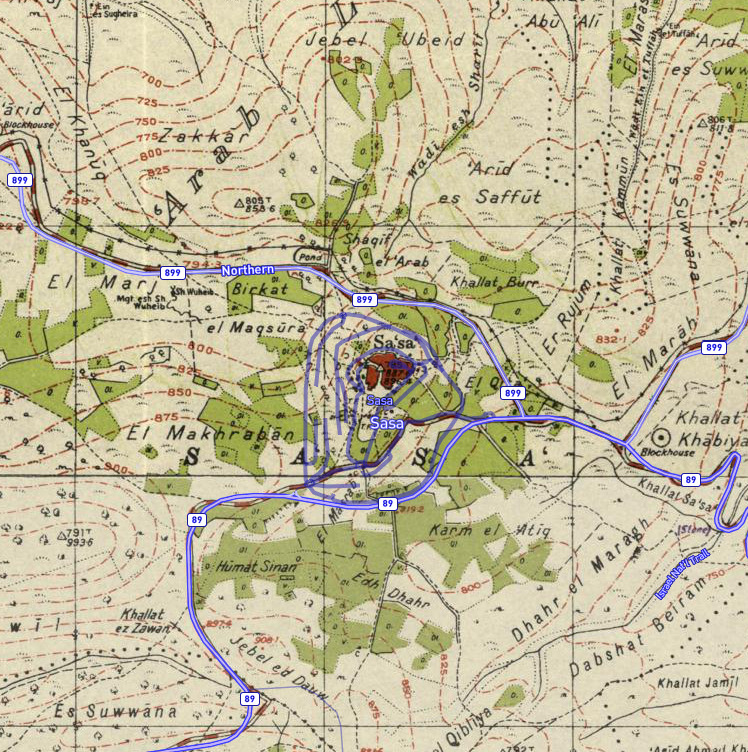
- 1870s map 1940s map modern map 1940s with modern overlay map A series of historical maps of the area around Sa'sa' (click the buttons)

- Location within Mandatory Palestine
- Coordinates: 33°01′43″N 35°23′40″E
- Palestine grid: 187/270
- Geopolitical entity: Mandatory Palestine
- Subdistrict: Safad
- Date of depopulation: 30 October 1948

Area
  - Total: 14,796 dunams (14.796 km^{2}; 5.713 sq mi)

Population (1945)
  - Total: 1,130
- Cause(s) of depopulation: Military assault by Yishuv forces
- Secondary cause: Expulsion by Yishuv forces
- Current Localities: Sasa

Sa'sa' (Arabic: سعسع, Hebrew: סעסע) was a Palestinian village, located 12 kilometres northwest of Safed, that was depopulated by Israeli forces during the 1948 Arab-Israeli war. The village suffered two massacres committed by Haganah forces: one in mid-February 1948 and the other at the end of October the same year. Its place has been taken since 1949 by Sasa, an Israeli kibbutz.

== History ==
Sa'sa' was built on the site of a Bronze Age (early second millennium B.C.) settlement whose remains (walls, tombs, cisterns, and olive and wine presses), have been unearthed. One village house had foundations which has been dated back to fourth century by archaeologists. Architectural fragments of a synagogue from the Late Roman and/or Byzantine period were excavated at the site.

The Arab geographer Abū 'Ubayd 'Abd Allāh al-Bakrī (d.1094) reported that one passed through Sa'sa' when travelling from Dayr al-Qasi to Safad. A house excavated in 2003 yielded ceramics dated to the fourteenth–fifteenth centuries CE, in the Mamluk period.

=== Ottoman period ===
In 1516 Sa'sa', with the rest of Palestine, came under the control of the Ottoman Empire. Shortly afterwards Sa'sa' was made a checkpoint where travellers were charged a toll and tariffs were collected on various goods. The first records of these levies are from 1525/6.

In 1596 Sa'sa' was classified as a village in the nahiya ("subdistrict") of Jira, part of liwa' ("district") of Safad, with a population of 457. It paid taxes on wheat, barley, olives and fruits, as well as on goats, beehives, and vineyards. According to these tax records all the villagers were Muslim. In the eighteenth century Sa'sa' is mentioned as one of the fortified villages of Galilee controlled by Daher al-Umar's son, Ali. After the defeat of Daher al-Umar in 1775, Ali continued to resist the Ottoman authorities and defeated an army sent against him at Sa'sa'.

Excavations in 1972 on the west side of the hill revealed the remains of a large rectangular structure (15m x 41m) with 2m thick walls made out of rubble stone with ashlar facing. At the south-west corner of the building there was a solid semi-circular tower (diameter 7m). The main part of the structure is a rectangular hall divided into two rows of five bays. There was a central row of four piers and two half-piers which would probably have supported a cross-vaulted roof. In a later phase an outer skin (2m wide) was added, making the wall a total of 4m thick. At the same time the round tower was converted into a square plan. According to the excavators, the place was occupied for a "fairly long" period, and suggest that it was probably part of the fortress built by Ali, (son of Daher al-Umar) in the eighteenth century. The design of the building is compatible with other fortresses of the period, like Qalat Jiddin and Dayr Hanna.

In 1875, Victor Guérin found it to be a Muslim village with about 350 inhabitants. In 1881, the PEF's Survey of Western Palestine (SWP) described Sa'sa' as a village with a population of 300, built on a slight hill that was surrounded by vineyards and olive and fig trees. A population list from about 1887 showed Sa'sa' to have about 1,740 inhabitants, all Muslim.

Pottery vessels from the Rashaya al-Fukhar workshops, dating to the late Ottoman and early Mandate eras have been found here.

=== British Mandate era ===
In the 1922 census of Palestine conducted by the British Mandate authorities, Sa'sa had a population of 634; all Muslim, increasing in the 1931 census to 840, still all Muslims, in a total of 154 houses.

The village had a small market-place in the village center with a few shops, as well as a mosque and two elementary schools, one for girls and one for boys.

In the 1944/45 statistics the village had a population of 1,130 Muslims and a total land area of 14,796 dunams. Of this, 4,496 dunums were used for cereals; 1,404 dunums were irrigated or used for orchards, while 48 dunams were built-up (urban) area.

=== 1948 war ===
During the 1948 Palestine war, Sa'sa' was the site of two massacres committed by Israeli forces.

On the night of 14-15 February 1948, Yigal Allon, commander of the Palmach in the north, ordered an attack on Sa'sa'. The order was given to Moshe Kelman, the deputy commander of Third Battalion. The order read: "You have to blow up twenty houses and kill as many warriors as possible". According to Pappé, the quote says which said "warriors" should be read "villagers". Khalidi, referencing "The History of the Haganah" by Ben-Zion Dinur, say they referred to the massacre as "one of the most daring raids into enemy territory." A Palmach unit entered the village during the night and, without resistance, planted explosives against some of the houses. Historians estimate 60 villagers were killed and 16-20 houses demolished. (Note: Benny Morris, 1948: A History of the First Arab-Israeli War, 2008, "killing some sixty villagers and destroying twenty houses.")

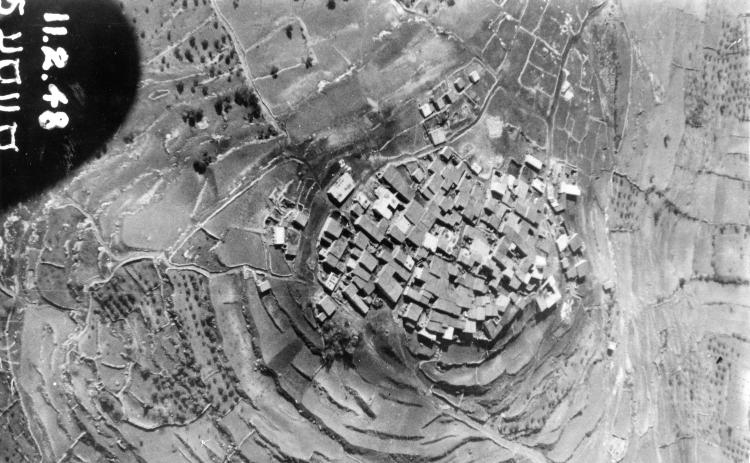
Sa'Sa' February 1948

A second massacre occurred after the surrender of the village on 30 October. Historian Saleh Abdel Jawad writes that "many villagers" were killed. (Note: Jawad, S.A. (2007). Zionist Massacres: the Creation of the Palestinian Refugee Problem in the 1948 War. In: Benvenisti, E., Gans, C., Hanafi, S. (eds) Israel and the Palestinian Refugees. Beiträge zum ausländischen öffentlichen Recht und Völkerrecht, vol 189. Springer, Berlin, Heidelberg. https://doi.org/10.1007/978-3-540-68161-8_3. "30 October [...] Indiscriminate killings occur. Many villagers, including cripples, are massacred after the surrender of the village.") (Note: Khalidi 1992, "The second massacre was perpetrated on 30 October, at the time that the village was occupied, during Operation Hiram")

Currently, there are few remains of the Palestinian village of Sa'sa', with the exception of the village mosque, which has now been converted into the kibbutz cultural center.

In 1992, the Palestinian historian Walid Khalidi described the remains of the village: "Some of the old olive trees remain, and a number of walls and houses still stand. Some of the houses are presently used by kibbutz Sasa; one of them has an arched entrance and arched windows. A large portion of the surrounding land is forested, the rest is cultivated by Israeli farmers."

== See also ==
- Ancient synagogues in the Palestine region - covers entire Palestine region/Land of Israel
  - Ancient synagogues in Israel - covers the modern State of Israel
- Depopulated Palestinian locations in Israel

== Bibliography ==
- Barron, J.B., ed. (1923). Palestine: Report and General Abstracts of the Census of 1922. Government of Palestine.
- Berger, Uri (2017-10-16). "Sasa" (129). Hadashot Arkheologiyot – Excavations and Surveys in Israel.
- Bron, Hendrik (Enno) (2006-12-10). "Sasa l Report" (118). Hadashot Arkheologiyot – Excavations and Surveys in Israel.
- Bron, Hendrik (Enno) (2013-04-02). "Sasa, Final report l Report" (125). Hadashot Arkheologiyot – Excavations and Surveys in Israel.
- Benvenisti, M. (2000). Sacred Landscape: The Buried History of the Holy Land Since 1948. Maxine Kaufman-Lacusta (translator). University of California Press. ISBN 0-520-92882-2.
- Cohen, Amnon (1973). Palestine in the Eighteenth Century: Patterns of Government and Administration. Jerusalem: Hebrew University. Cited in Petersen, (2001)
- Cohen, Amnon; Lewis, B. (1978). Population and Revenue in the Towns of Palestine in the Sixteenth Century. Princeton University Press. ISBN 0-691-09375-X.
- Conder, C.R.; Kitchener, H.H. (1881). The Survey of Western Palestine: Memoirs of the Topography, Orography, Hydrography, and Archaeology. Vol. 1. London: Committee of the Palestine Exploration Fund. (p. 256)
- Department of Statistics (1945). Village Statistics, April, 1945. Government of Palestine.
- Gibson, S and Braun, E. (1972) Sa'sa', HA, 63-64, pp 11–12 (in Hebrew). Cited in Petersen, 2002
- Guérin, V. (1880). Description Géographique Historique et Archéologique de la Palestine (in French). Vol. 3: Galilee, pt. 2. Paris: L'Imprimerie Nationale.
- Hadawi, S. (1970). Village Statistics of 1945: A Classification of Land and Area ownership in Palestine. Palestine Liberation Organization Research Center.
- Hütteroth, W.-D.; Abdulfattah, K. (1977). Historical Geography of Palestine, Transjordan and Southern Syria in the Late 16th Century. Erlanger Geographische Arbeiten, Sonderband 5. Erlangen, Germany: Vorstand der Fränkischen Geographischen Gesellschaft. ISBN 3-920405-41-2.
- Khalidi, W. (1992). All That Remains:The Palestinian Villages Occupied and Depopulated by Israel in 1948. Washington D.C.: Institute for Palestine Studies. ISBN 0-88728-224-5.
- Mills, E., ed. (1932). Census of Palestine 1931. Population of Villages, Towns and Administrative Areas. Jerusalem: Government of Palestine.
- Morris, B. (2004). The Birth of the Palestinian Refugee Problem Revisited. Cambridge University Press. ISBN 978-0-521-00967-6.
- Nazzal, Nafez (1978). The Palestinian Exodus from Galilee 1948. The Institute for Palestine Studies. (Sa'sa' pp. 46, 95)
- Palmer, E.H. (1881). The Survey of Western Palestine: Arabic and English Name Lists Collected During the Survey by Lieutenants Conder and Kitchener, R. E. Transliterated and Explained by E.H. Palmer. Committee of the Palestine Exploration Fund.
- Pappé, I. (2007). The ethnic cleansing of Palestine. (reprint). Oneworld Publications Limited. ISBN 978-1-78074-056-0.
- Petersen, Andrew (2001). A Gazetteer of Buildings in Muslim Palestine (British Academy Monographs in Archaeology). Vol. 1. Oxford University Press. ISBN 978-0-19-727011-0.
- Robinson, E.; Smith, E. (1841). Biblical Researches in Palestine, Mount Sinai and Arabia Petraea: A Journal of Travels in the year 1838. Vol. 3. Boston: Crocker & Brewster. (pp. 368-369)
- Schumacher, G. (1888). "Population list of the Liwa of Akka". Quarterly Statement - Palestine Exploration Fund. 20: 169–191.
- Smithline, Howard (1997). "Sasa, West l Report" (16). Hadashot Arkheologiyot – Excavations and Surveys in Israel.
- Syon, Danny; Nagar, Yossi (2014-09-08). "Sasa, Final report l Report" (126). Hadashot Arkheologiyot – Excavations and Surveys in Israel.
