= E. W. Kellermann =

German–British physicist (1915–2012)

Ernst Walter Kellermann (2 April 1915 in Berlin – 15 November 2012 in London) was a German-British physicist.

== Life ==
Ernst Walter Kellermann was the son of Rabbi and school principal Benzion Kellermann and Thekla Lehmann (1876–1964). His brother Heinz Kellermann (Henry J. Kellermann; 1910–1998), became a U.S. diplomat. He was initially educated at the Kaiser-Friedrich-Schule in Berlin, leaving in 1933. After the Nazis came to power, he was prevented from studying at the University of Berlin because he was Jewish. So he went to the University of Vienna and carried out research at the Austrian Academy of Sciences' Institute for Radium Research, earning a doctorate in 1937 with a dissertation "On the Discoloration and Luminescence of Fluorite." He emigrated to Great Britain in September 1937. His friend Friedrich Koczy emigrated to Sweden.

Kellermann became an assistant to the physicist Max Born, who had fled Germany in 1934, at the University of Edinburgh. Klaus Fuchs was one of his colleagues. In 1939, Kellermann earned a doctorate with a thesis on the 'Theory of the Vibrations of the Sodium Chloride Lattice.'

In 1940 he was interned as an enemy alien and deported to Canada, but in 1941 he was permitted to return, and worked as a lecturer in physics at the University College of Southampton. In 1946, he took a research post at the University of Manchester. He married the French teacher Marcelle Loebell, and they had three children; their daughter Barbara Kellerman became an actress. In 1947, they received British citizenship. From 1949, he worked at the Department of Physics at the University of Leeds, from 1962 as a Senior Lecturer. He was involved in the institute's Haverah Park Cosmic Ray Project. Kellermann retired in 1980. and moved to London. He was a supporter of the Labour Party and a member of the Fabian Society.

== Selected publications ==
- Zur Verfärbung und Lumineszenz des Fluorits. Wien : Hölder-Pichler-Tempsky, 1937
- Theory of the Vibrations of the Sodium Chloride Lattice, in: Philosophical Transactions of the Royal Society of London, 238 (1940), S. 513–548
- Science and Technology in France and Belgium. Harlow, 1988
