= Elad Peled =

Israeli general (1927–2021)

- אלעד פלד
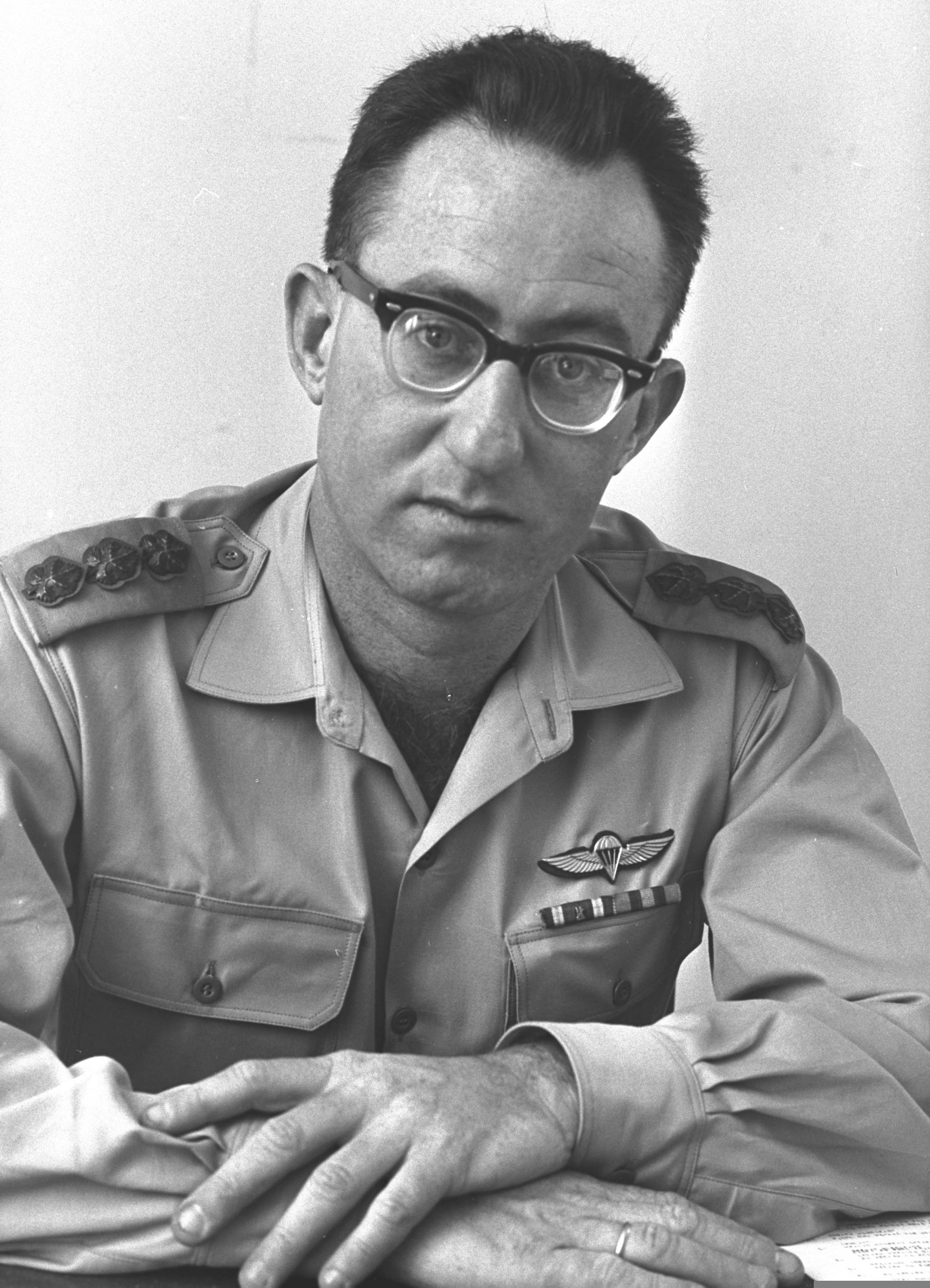
- Elad Peled, 1965
- Born: 11 November 1927; Jerusalem, Mandatory Palestine
- Died: 26 July 2021 (aged 93); Israel
- Military career
- Allegiance: Israel
- Branch: Haganah; Palmach; Israel Defense Forces
- Service years: 1944-1968
- Rank: General
- Conflicts: 1947–1949 Palestine war (1947-1949); Operation Kadesh (1956); Six-Day War (1967)
- Other work: Deputy Director General of the Israel Electric Company, Director of the Ministry of Education, Deputy Mayor of Jerusalem, Educator

Elad Peled (Hebrew: אלעד פלד; 11 November 1927 - 26 July 2021) was an Israeli general.

Peled joined the Haganah while in high school. He joined the Palmach in 1944. During the 1948 Arab–Israeli War he was a squad commander in the Yiftach Brigade. Peled commanded the 36th Division, which operated in the West Bank during the Six-Day War.

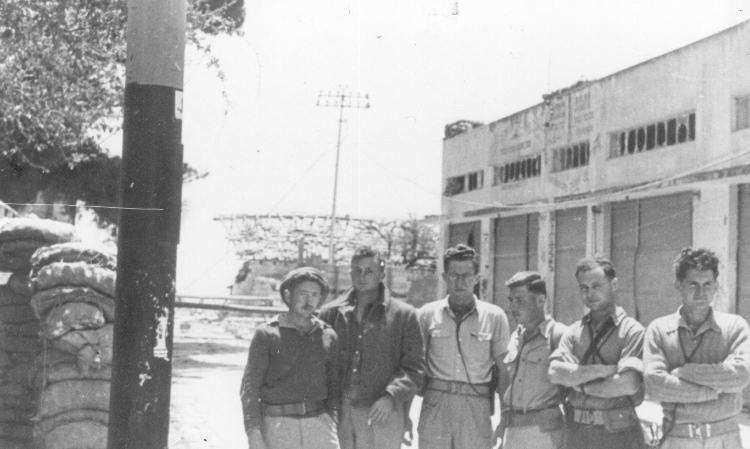
Yiftach Brigade commanders in Safed, 1948. Elad Peled with glasses. Moshe Kelman to his left

He was also later involved in the Yom Kippur War.

Following his retirement from the military, he obtained the position of Director General of the Ministry of Education and Culture.

He died on 26 July 2021.
