= Ein al-Zeitun =

Ein al-Zeitun عين الزيتون Ayn az-Zaytun
- Village
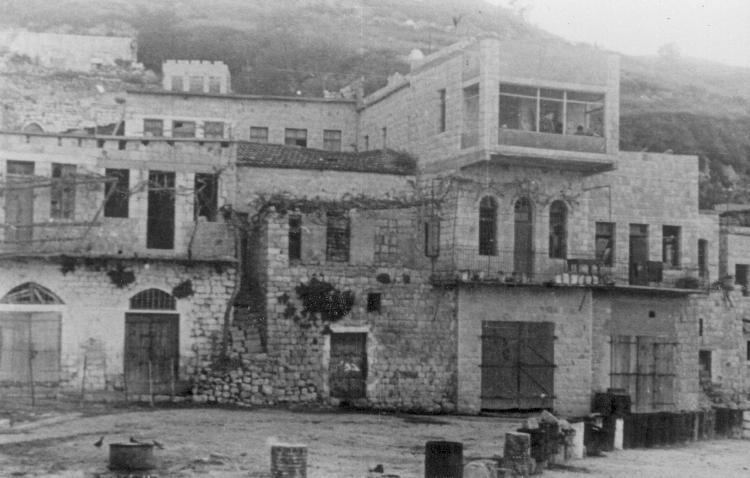
- Ein al-Zeitun, 1948
- Etymology: "spring of olives"
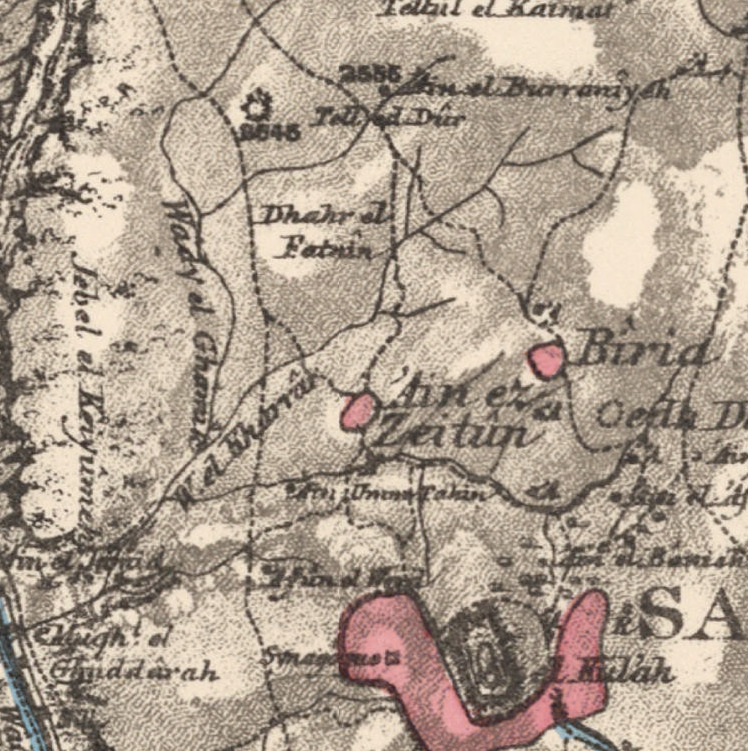
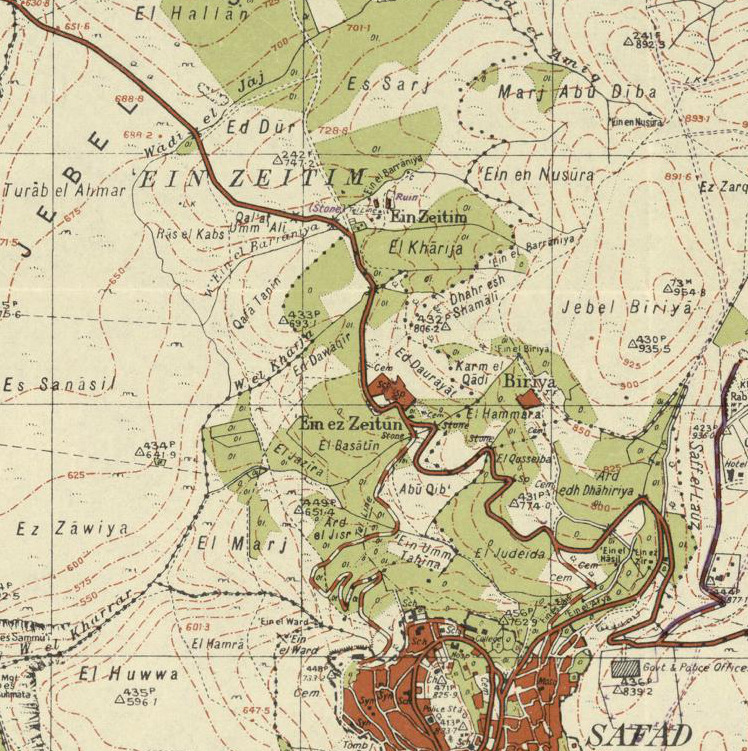
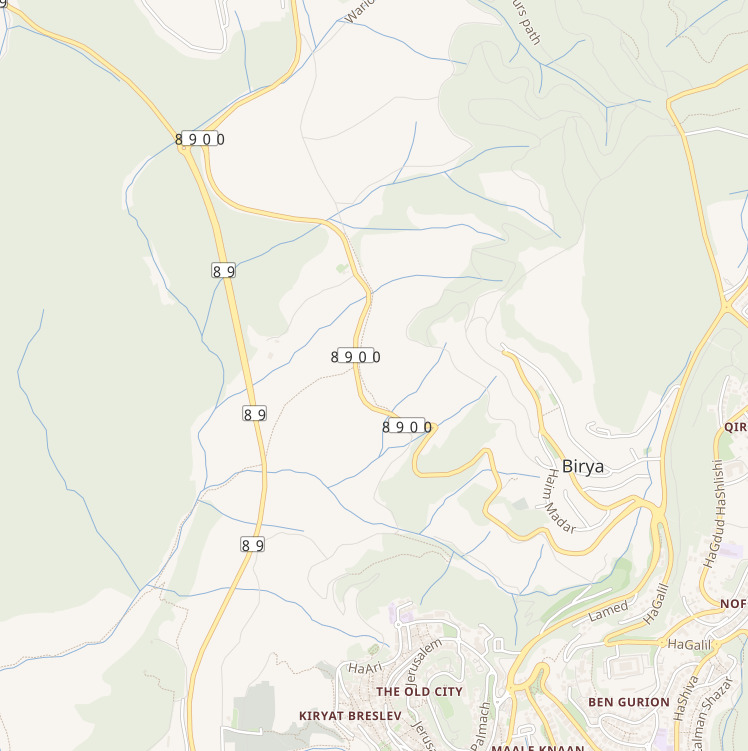
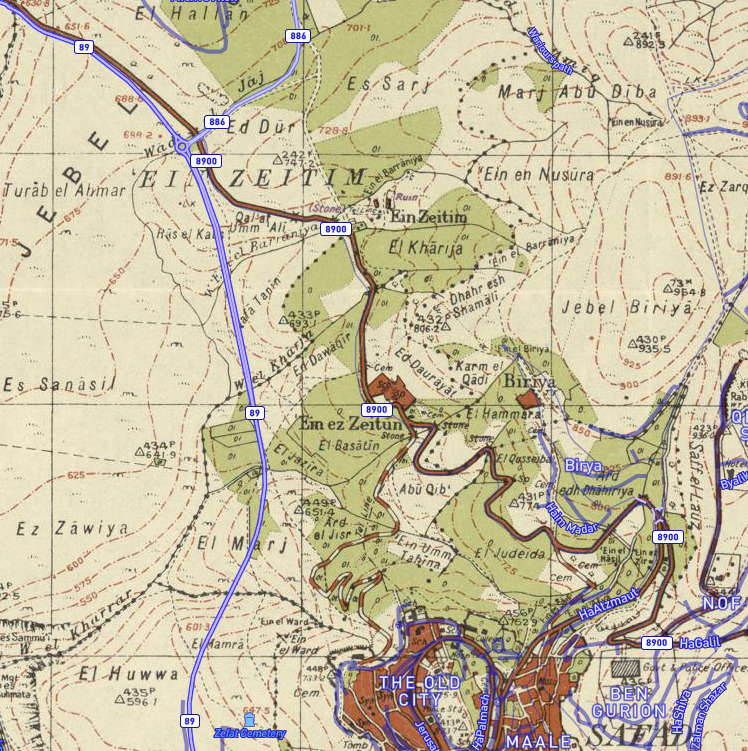
- 1870s map 1940s map modern map 1940s with modern overlay map A series of historical maps of the area around Ein al-Zeitun (click the buttons)

- Location within Mandatory Palestine
- Coordinates: 32°58′51″N 35°29′30″E
- Palestine grid: 196/265
- Geopolitical entity: Mandatory Palestine
- Subdistrict: Safad
- Date of depopulation: May 2, 1948

Area
  - Total: 1,100 dunams (1.1 km^{2}; 0.42 sq mi)

Population (1945)
  - Total: 820
- Cause(s) of depopulation: Military assault by Yishuv forces
- Current Localities: None

Ein al-Zeitun (Note: Ein also spelled as Ain or Ayn, and Zeitun as Zaytun), was a Palestinian village located 1.5 kilometres (0.93 mi) north of Safed in the Upper Galilee. During the early Ottoman Empire, Ein el-Zeitun had a mixed population of Muslims and Jews. Later, in the 19th century, it became entirely Muslim. The village's small population and land area, as well as its proximity to Safad, made it a suburb of the city. In 1945, the village had a population of 820 inhabitants and a total land area of 1100 dunams.

After the Palmach attacked the village and killed 70+ villagers on May 1, 1948, an incident called the Ein al-Zeitun massacre, the village was depopulated.

== Location ==
Ein al-Zeitun was located on the western slope of Wadi al-Dilb, next to the highway leading to Safed, 1.5 kilometres (0.93 mi) north of the city.

== History ==
Wadi al-Dilb may have been the wadi that Al-Dimashqi (d. 1327) called Wadi Dulayba, which he described as lying between Meiron and Safed. Al-Dimashqi described a spring where water gushed forward for one or two hours, allowing people to collect drinking water and wash, before it abruptly retreated. The village name, which was Arabic for "spring of olives", did indicate that there was a spring in the vicinity.

=== Ottoman era ===
Under the Ottoman Empire in the 16th century, Ein al-Zeitun was a town in the nahiya ("subdistrict") of Jira, part of Sanjak Safad, with a mixed population of Muslims and Jews. Tax registers in 1596 recorded 59 Muslim households and 6 bachelors, plus 45 Jewish households and 3 bachelors; an estimated total of 622 inhabitants. The villagers paid taxes on olives, grapes, wheat and barley, as well as on vineyards and orchards; a total of 3,600 akçe.

The village was destroyed, along with Safed and other nearby villages, in an earthquake in 1837. In 1838, Robinson passed by and noted: "the large village Ain ez-Zeitun with its fine vineyards, north of Safed. The village at the distance had a thrifty appearance, although it was laid in ruins by the earthquake."

Victor Guérin, who visited in 1875, found a village with two springs, surrounded by slopes covered in olives, figs, walnuts and vegetables. The population consisted of 350 Muslims.

In 1881, the PEF's Survey of Western Palestine (SWP) described Ain al Zeitun as a stone-built village on top of a hill north of Safad. The village had then a population of 200–350, and it was surrounded by arable land.

A population list from about 1887 showed Ain ez Zeitun to have about 775 inhabitants, all Muslim.

=== British Mandate era ===
In the 1922 census of Palestine conducted by the British Mandate authorities, 'Ain Zaitun had a population of 386, all Muslims, increasing in the 1931 census to 567, still all Muslims, in a total of 127 houses.

The town contained a mosque and a boys' elementary school. The villagers cultivated olives, grain and fruit, especially grapes. In the 1944/45 statistics, with a population of 820 Muslims, a total of 280 dunums of village land was used for cereals, 477 dunums were irrigated or used for orchards, while 35 dunams were classified as urban (built-up) land.

=== 1948 War and aftermath ===
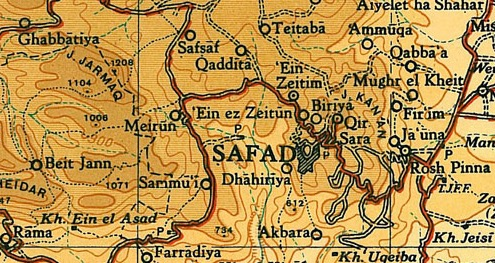
Villages around Safad, 1945

According to Ilan Pappé, the Jewish troops followed a policy of massacres in villages close to Arab urban centres, in order to precipitate the flight of the people in the cities and towns nearby. This was the case of Nasir al-Din near Tiberias, Ein al-Zeitun near Safad, and Tirat Haifa near Haifa. In all villages groups of "males between the age of 10 and 50", were executed in order to intimidate and terrorise the village population and those living in nearby towns.

Ein al-Zeitun was captured by Palmach troops on May 2, 1948. Immediately prior to the capture, most of the young and middle-aged males fled the town. The remaining population was expelled by Israeli forces in the following days. Between 30 and 70 unarmed Arab prisoners were killed afterwards. One man, Rashid Khalil, was killed after a group of the village's inhabitants attempted to return to Ein al-Zeitun.

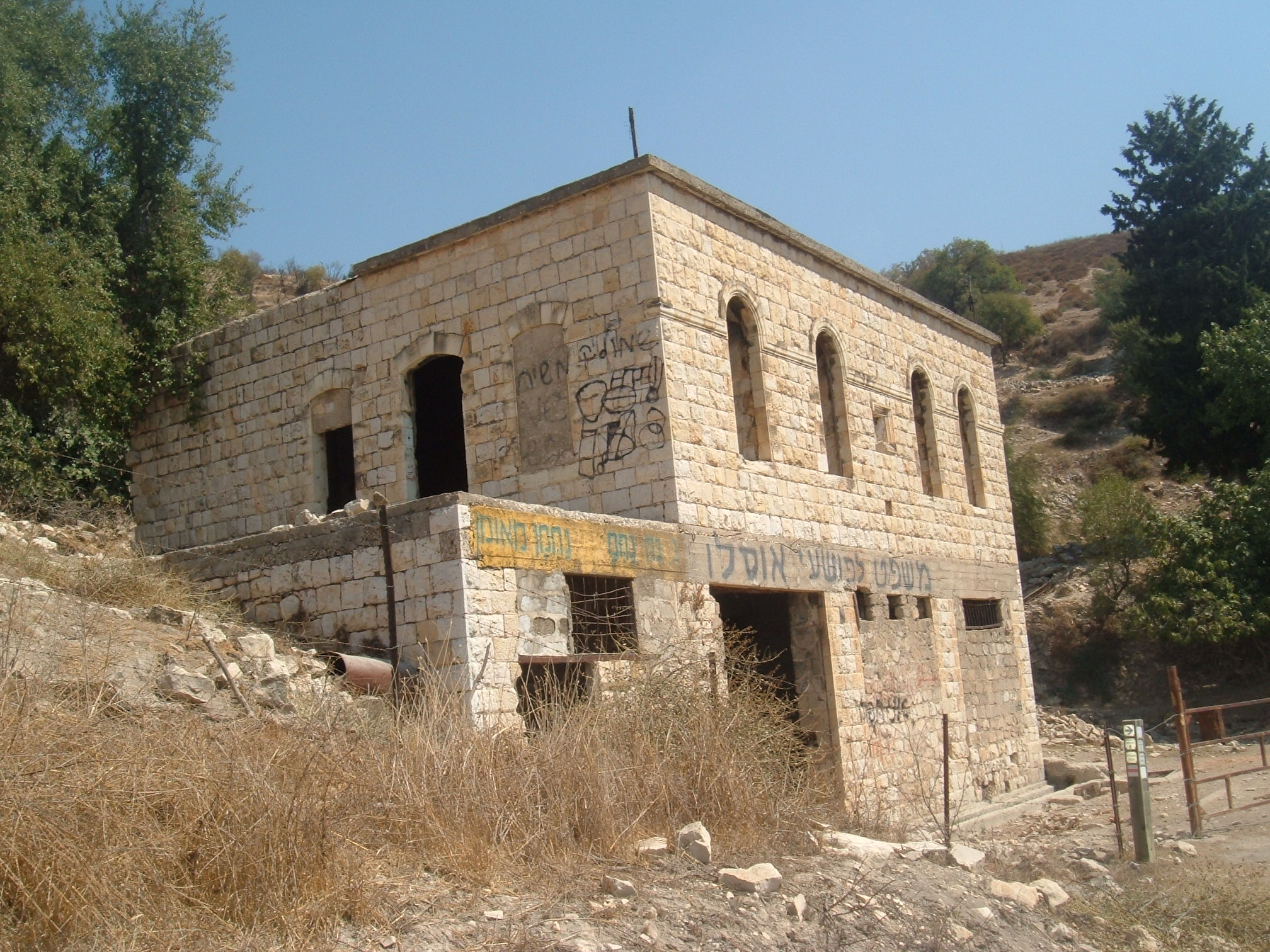
Old mosque of Ein al-Zeitun, 2007

Palestinian historian Walid Khalidi, describing the place in 1992, found that:

The rubble of destroyed stone houses is scattered throughout the site, which is otherwise overgrown with olive trees and cactuses [cacti]. A few deserted houses remain, some with round arched entrances and tall windows with various arched designs. In one of the remaining houses, the smooth stone above the entrance arch is inscribed with Arabic calligraphy, a fixture of Palestinian architecture. The well and the village spring also remain.

In 2004 the remains of the Ein al-Zeitun mosque was turned into a milk farm. The Jewish owner removed the stone that indicated the founding date of the mosque and covered the walls with Hebrew graffiti.

== Portrayals in art ==
Oral histories from Ein al-Zeitun provided Elias Khoury with material for his 1998 book Bab al Shams (Gate of the Sun), which was filmed in 2004.

Israeli author Netiva Ben-Yehuda was in the village when the massacre happened, and wrote the following about it:

But Yehonathan continued to yell, and suddenly he turned with his back to Mairke, and walked away furiously, all the time continuing to complain: "He is out of his mind! Hundreds of people are lying there tied! Go and kill them! Go and waste hundreds of people! A madman kills people bound like this and only a madman wastes all the ammunition on them!...I don´t know who they had in mind, who is coming to inspect them, but I understand it's become urgent, suddenly we have to untie the knots around these POW’s hands and legs, and then I realized they are all dead, "problem solved".

== See also ==
- Depopulated Palestinian locations in Israel
- Biriya Forest
- Ein Zeitim

== Bibliography ==
- Barron, J.B., ed. (1923). Palestine: Report and General Abstracts of the Census of 1922. Government of Palestine.
- Conder, C.R.; Kitchener, H.H. (1881). The Survey of Western Palestine: Memoirs of the Topography, Orography, Hydrography, and Archaeology. Vol. 1. London: Committee of the Palestine Exploration Fund.
- Department of Statistics (1945). Village Statistics, April, 1945. Government of Palestine. Archived from the original on 2024-02-03.
- Guérin, V. (1880). Description Géographique Historique et Archéologique de la Palestine (in French). Vol. 3: Galilee, pt. 2. Paris: L'Imprimerie Nationale.
- Hadawi, S. (1970). Village Statistics of 1945: A Classification of Land and Area ownership in Palestine. Palestine Liberation Organization Research Center. Archived from the original on 2018-12-08.
- Hütteroth, W.-D.; Abdulfattah, K. (1977). Historical Geography of Palestine, Transjordan and Southern Syria in the Late 16th Century. Erlanger Geographische Arbeiten, Sonderband 5. Erlangen, Germany: Vorstand der Fränkischen Geographischen Gesellschaft. ISBN 3-920405-41-2. Archived from the original on 2025-07-02.
- Khalidi, W. (1992). All That Remains:The Palestinian Villages Occupied and Depopulated by Israel in 1948. Washington D.C.: Institute for Palestine Studies. ISBN 0-88728-224-5. Archived from the original on 2024-10-08.
- Mills, E., ed. (1932). Census of Palestine 1931. Population of Villages, Towns and Administrative Areas. Jerusalem: Government of Palestine.
- Morris, B. (2004). The Birth of the Palestinian Refugee Problem Revisited. Cambridge University Press. ISBN 978-0-521-00967-6. Archived from the original on 2024-10-07.
- Nazzal, Nafez (1978). The Palestinian Exodus from Galilee 1948. Beirut: The Institute for Palestine Studies. ISBN 9780887281280.
- Palmer, E.H. (1881). The Survey of Western Palestine: Arabic and English Name Lists Collected During the Survey by Lieutenants Conder and Kitchener, R. E. Transliterated and Explained by E.H. Palmer. Committee of the Palestine Exploration Fund.
- Pappé, I. (2007). The Ethnic Cleansing of Palestine. London and New York: Oneworld. ISBN 978-1-78074-056-0.
- Petersen, Andrew (2005). The Towns of Palestine Under Muslim Rule. British Archaeological Reports. ISBN 1841718211.
- Rhode, H. (1979). Administration and Population of the Sancak of Safed in the Sixteenth Century (PhD). Columbia University. Archived from the original on 2020-03-01.
- Robinson, E.; Smith, E. (1841). Biblical Researches in Palestine, Mount Sinai and Arabia Petraea: A Journal of Travels in the year 1838. Vol. 3. Boston: Crocker & Brewster.
- Schumacher, G. (1888). "Population list of the Liwa of Akka". Quarterly Statement - Palestine Exploration Fund. 20: 169–191.
