= Sasa, Israel =

Kibbutz in northern Israel

Sasa: סָאסָא (Hebrew)
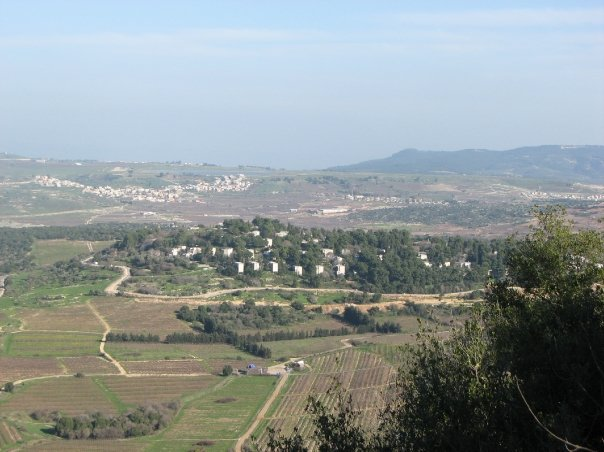

- Location within Northeast Israel Location within Israel
- Coordinates: 33°1′37″N 35°23′40″E
- Country: Israel
- District: Northern
- Subdistrict: Acre
- Council: Upper Galilee
- Affiliation: Kibbutz Movement
- Founded: January 1949
- Founder: Hashomer Hatzair members
- Population (2024): 432
- Website: www.sasa.org.il

Sasa or Sassa (Hebrew: סָאסָא) is a kibbutz in the Upper Galilee area of northern Israel. Located one mile from the border with Lebanon, it falls under the jurisdiction of Upper Galilee Regional Council. In 2024 it had a population of 432.

== History ==
=== Pre-1948 ===
Architectural fragments of a synagogue from the Late Roman and/or Byzantine period were excavated at the site and are visible inside the kibbutz.

In 1992, the Palestinian historian Walid Khalidi described the remains of Sa'sa' village: "Some of the old olive trees remain, and a number of walls and houses still stand. Some of the houses are presently used by the kibbutz; one of them has an arched entrance and arched windows. A large portion of the surrounding land is forested, the rest is cultivated by Israeli farmers." The village mosque has been converted into the kibbutz museum.

=== The kibbutz ===
The modern kibbutz was founded in January 1949 by a gar'in of North American Hashomer Hatzair members on the land of the depopulated Palestinian village of Sa'sa'. Sa'sa' was demolished by the Israeli Seventh Brigade and Oded Brigade on October 30, 1948. Many of the villagers from Sa'sa live in Nahr al-Bared, a Palestinian refugee camp in Lebanon, although some resettled in nearby Jish.

On the grounds of the kibbutz is the alleged tomb of Levi ben Sisi, who is usually believed to have died in far-away Babylonia during the first half of the third century.

In 1950, the American correspondent Kenneth W. Bilby started his book "New Star in The Near East" - depicting the 1948 war and its aftermath - with an eyewitness account of Sasa: "Face Lifting". The Mukhtar of Sasa had fled, and his 2000 Arab villagers with him. By November 1949, 120 young American-born Jews had supplanted them, and the old village roosting on a Galilean hilltop had begun to acquire a Western flavor. The Mukhtar's home was being plastered and cemented into a communal shower. Power-driven lathes, imported from the United States, were turning out furniture for the new Jewish settlements which mushroomed in the Galilee. Prefabricated barracks with beaverboard interiors, fresh-painted American tractors, and an experimental windmill which resembled a radar antenna provided more accouterments of progress. Sasa, which had existed unchanged for over a thousand years, was on the altar - an offering, like the lambs of Abraham, for the betterment of the people of Israel".

== Economy ==
Sasa operates Plasan, a plastics factory that manufactures vehicle armour. The company, which is shared between some 100 families, is now a world leader in armor protection technology for vehicles. The kibbutz has signed contracts worth billions of dollars with major clients, including the U.S. military.

Other branches of the economy include a dairy, in cooperation with kibbutz Tuval; a beef herd; fruit trees (kiwi, apple, avocado and grapefruit); Bereshit, a fruit marketing company in cooperation with three other kibbutzim; and Sasa Tech, a manufacturer of technical and home care products. Buza, a chain of ice cream shops founded by a Sasa resident, runs a branch on the kibbutz and offers ice cream workshops.

== Gallery ==
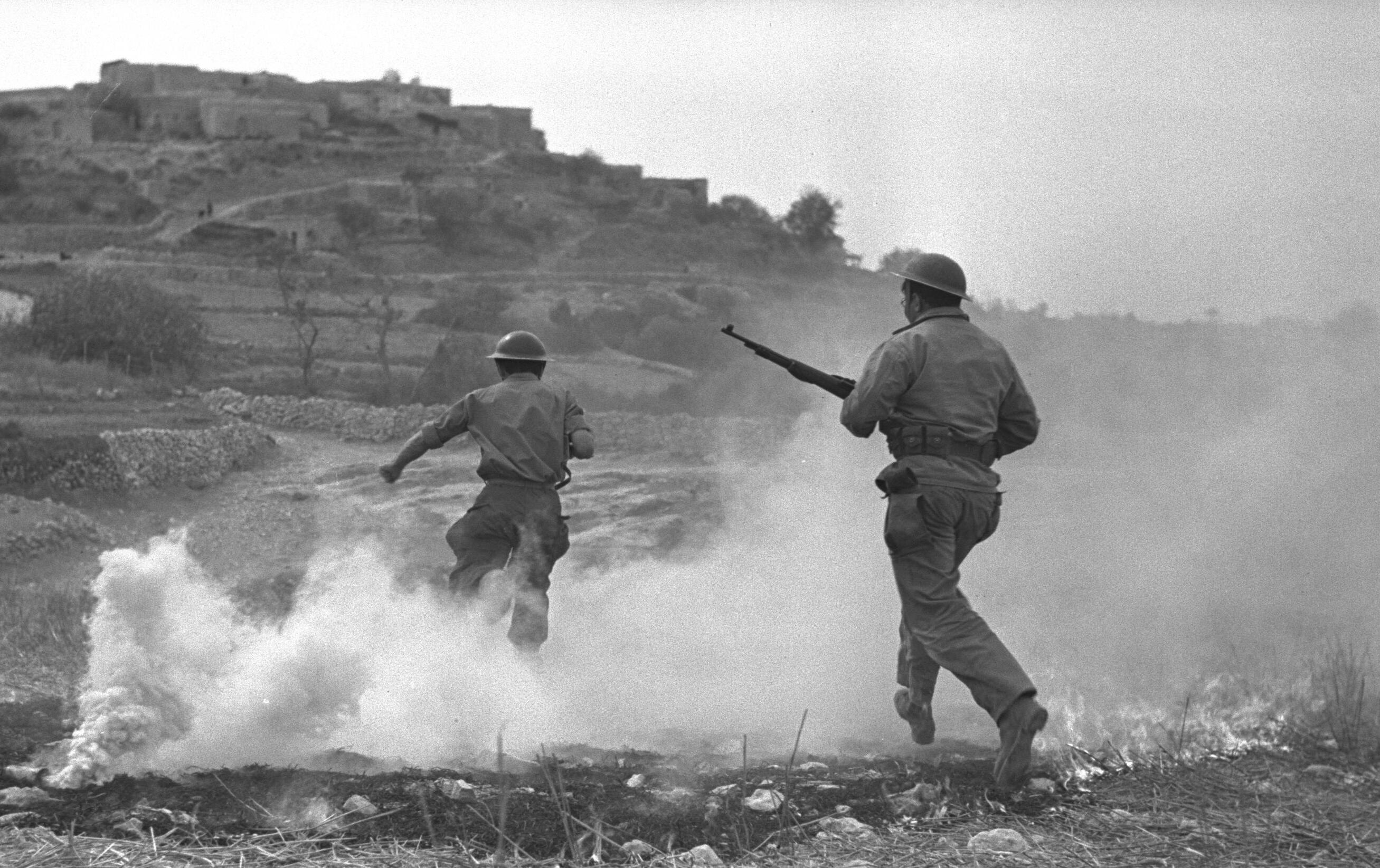
Israeli soldiers in battle with the Arab village of Sassa 1 October 1948

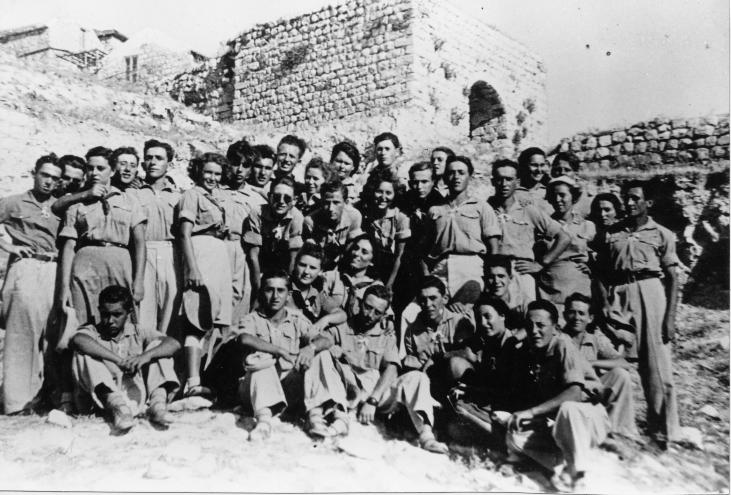
Members of kibbutz Sasa in 1948

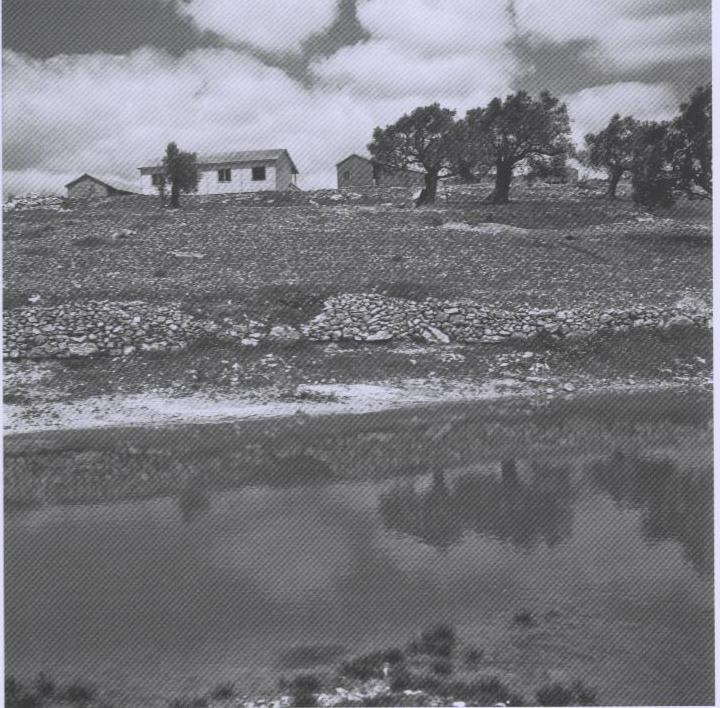
Kibbutz Sasa in 1949

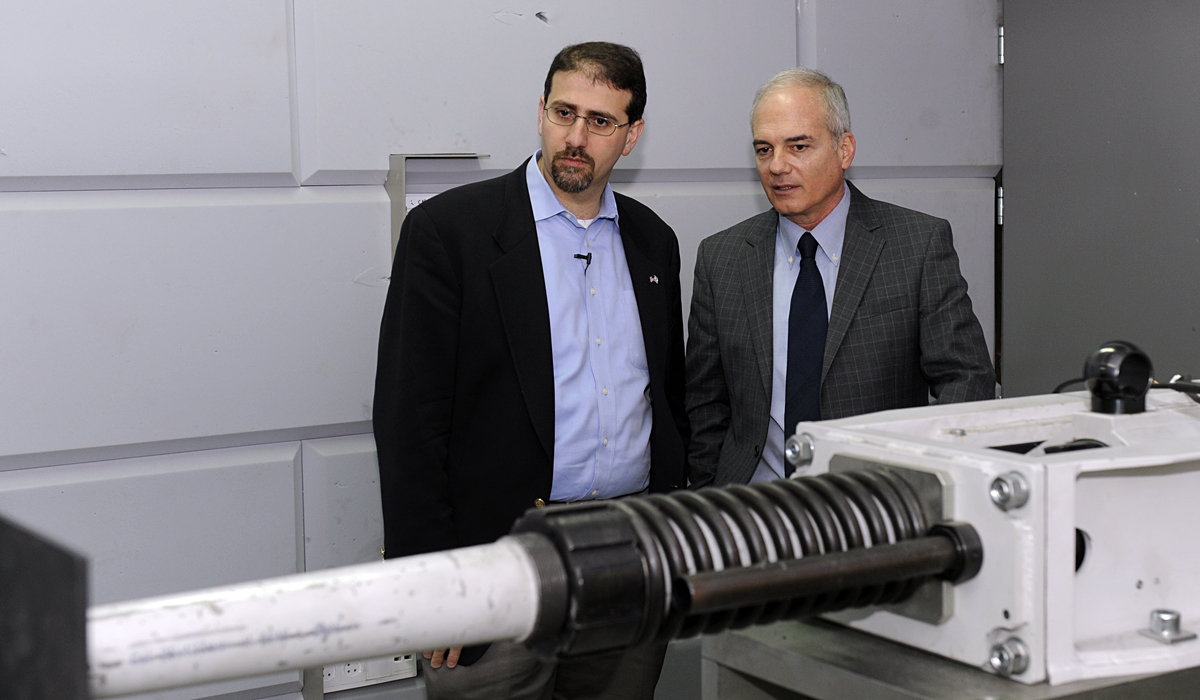
U.S. Ambassador Dan Shapiro visiting Plasan, 2012

== See also ==
- Ancient synagogues in the Palestine region - covers entire Palestine region/Land of Israel
  - Ancient synagogues in Israel - covers the modern State of Israel
