= Barbara Kellerman =

British actress

- Born: Barbara Rose Kellermann; 30 December 1949 (age 76); Manchester, Lancashire, England
- Education: Rose Bruford College
- Occupation: Actress
- Years active: 1969–2008
- Spouse: Robin Scobey (m. 1975; div. 1999)
- Parents: Ernst Walter Kellermann (father); Marcelle Kellermann (mother)

Barbara Rose Kellermann (born 30 December 1949), known professionally as Barbara Kellerman, is an English film and television actress.

== Early life and family ==
Kellerman was born in Manchester on 30 December 1949 to a German-Jewish father and a French mother. Her mother, Marcelle Kellermann, was a writer, language teacher and member of the French Resistance. One of three siblings, Kellerman trained at Rose Bruford College. She was previously married to Robin Scobey.

== Career ==
Kellerman's film credits include: Satan's Slave, The Monster Club and The Sea Wolves. Her television appearances include: Space: 1999, The Glittering Prizes, 1990, The Mad Death, Quatermass and The Chronicles of Narnia.

Kellerman has appeared in two of British television's hardest-hitting police dramas of the 1970s: Special Branch and The Professionals. In Special Branch she appeared as Michelle, a flashback character who was a member of the French Resistance in the episode episode Rendezvous (1973). Whilst in The Professionals she played Sylvie, the girlfriend of a former police officer who also has a relationship with a renegade former member of an organised crime network in the episode Runner (1979).

She is also known for her appearances in the BBC adaptations of three of the Narnia books, most notably as the tyrannical White Witch in The Lion, the Witch & the Wardrobe (1988). A year later she had a minor role as the Old Hag (Narnian Hag) in Prince Caspian in (1989), and finally as the evil Lady of the Green Kirtle in The Silver Chair in 1990. On the radio, she portrayed Modesty Blaise in a 1978 BBC World Service adaptation of the novel Last Day in Limbo.

She made a 20-minute drama for With Light Productions in 2007 for director Anita Parry entitled The Lights of Santa Cruz. It co-starred Christian Rodska and was the story of two middle-aged divorcees doing up a boat on the Somerset coast. It was filmed in Watchet, Somerset (a small shipping port on the south-west coast of England) over a four-day period, mostly on a refitted Swedish fishing boat, the Josefine. The film was entered into Bristol's Brief Encounters Festival and is now on YouTube.

== Filmography ==
=== Film ===
Year	Title	Role	Notes
1969	The Oblong Box	Dr. Newhartt's Patient	
1976	Satan's Slave	Frances	
1980	The Sea Wolves	Mrs. Cromwell	
1981	The Monster Club	Angela	
1982	Living Apart Together	Evie	
2007	The Lights of Santa Cruz	Beth	Short
2008	Isaac	Mum	Short

=== Television ===
Year	Title	Role	Notes
1969	How We Used to Live	Girl	1 episode
1971	On the House	Maureen	1 episode
1973	Special Branch	Michelle	1 episode
1973	Wessex Tales	Nanny	1 episode
1974	Marked Personal	Jane Wright	2 episodes
1974	General Hospital	Nurse Laura Hardy	Unknown episodes
1974	John Halifax, Gentleman	Louise	
1975	Space: 1999	Dr. Monique Boucher	episode: Dragon's Domain
1976	The Glittering Prizes	Barbara Morris	4 episodes
1976	BBC Play of the Month	Jacqueline Maingot	episode: French Without Tears
1976	Victorian Scandals	Jane Brookfield	1 episode
1976	A Pitcher of Snakes		
1976	The Crezz	Alexandra Tuke	1 episode
1977	1990	Delly Lomas	8 episodes
1979	The Quatermass Conclusion	Clare Kapp	
1979	BBC Television Shakespeare	Anne Boleyn	Episode: The Famous History of the Life of King Henry VIII
1979	Crown Court	Miranda Buckingham	1 episode
1979	The Professionals	Sylvie	episode: Runner
1980	BBC2 Playhouse	Isobel Dodgson	episode: The Enigma
1980	Lady Killers	Madame Marie Fahmy	1 episode
1980	Hammer House of Horror	Laurie Morton	episode: Growing Pains
1983	Number 10	Frances Stevenson	1 episode
1983	The Mad Death	Anne Maitland	
1983	Storyboard		1 episode
1984	Morte d'Arthur	Queen Guinevere	
1985	My Brother Jonathan	Rachel Hammond	
1986	Lytton's Diary	Helena	5 episodes
1988–90	The Chronicles of Narnia	The White Witch, Narnian Hag and the Lady of the Green Kirtle	
1998	The Bill		1 episode
2000	Monsignor Renard	Mme Dufosse	3 episodes
