= Netiva Ben-Yehuda =

Israeli author, editor, and media personality

- נתיבה בן-יהודה
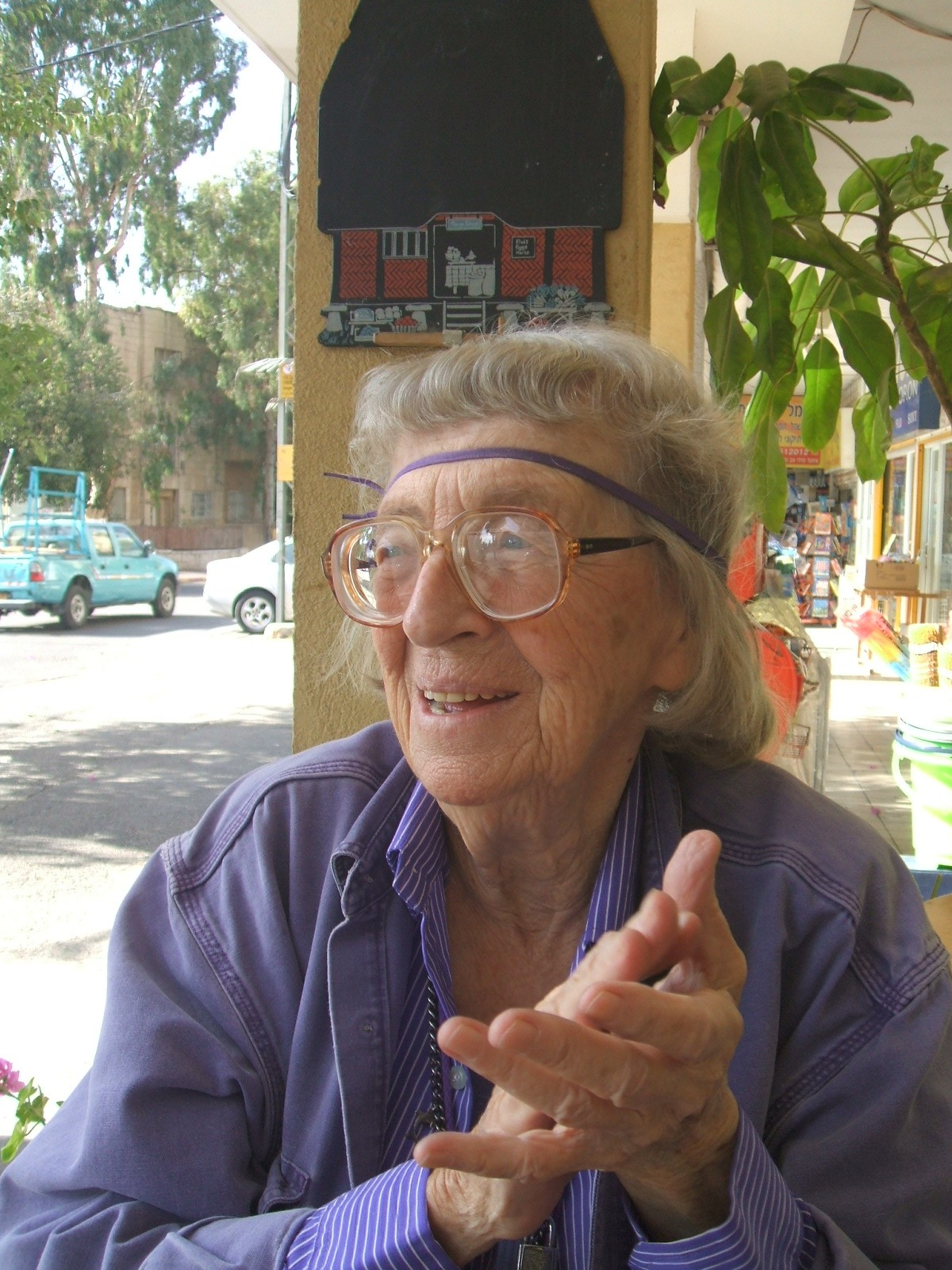
- Netiva Ben-Yehuda, 2008
- Born: 26 July 1928; Tel Aviv, Mandatory Palestine
- Died: 28 February 2011 (aged 82)
- Occupations: Author, Editor, and former soldier of the Palmach

Netiva Ben Yehuda (Hebrew: נתיבה בן-יהודה; July 1928, Tel Aviv – 28 February 2011) was an Israeli author, editor, and media personality. She was a commander in the pre-state Jewish underground Palmach.

== Biography ==
Netiva ("Tiva") Ben-Yehuda was born in Tel Aviv, in Mandate Palestine, on 26 July 1928. Her father was Baruch Ben-Yehuda, director general of the first Israeli ministry of education.

Ben-Yehuda joined the Palmach at the age of 18 and was trained in demolition, bomb disposal, topography, and scouting. Her duties included transferring ammunition, escorting convoys, and training recruits.

The Palmach generally opposed women fighting at the front, however Ben-Yehuda was a commander and participated in several battles by performing sabotage operations. On February 11, 1948, Ben-Yehuda and her comrades planted a mine for a busload of Arabs. This event and the ensuing death impacted Ben-Yehuda psychologically.

Ben-Yehuda considered competing in discus throwing at the Olympics, but a bullet injury to her arm kept her from pursuing an athletic career. She studied at the Bezalel Academy of Art and Design in Jerusalem and Jewish philosophy at the Hebrew University of Jerusalem.

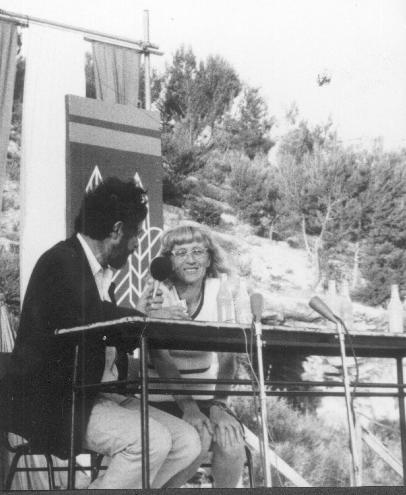
Photo of Netiva Ben-Yehuda with Dahn Ben-Amotz from Palmach Archive

Ben Yehuda worked as a freelance editor and in 1972 published The World Dictionary of Hebrew Slang. Between 1981 and 1991, she published her Palmah trilogy, a series of three novels based on her own experience in the War of Independence (see "Published works"). She wrote over 30 books, including a Hebrew slang dictionary, coauthored with Dahn Ben-Amotz.

She was the host of a late-night Israel Radio show for 14 years, where she played old-time Israeli songs and spoke with callers. She was a resident of Palmach Street in the capital, and the local cafe she patronized on that street became known as "Cafe Netiva."

Ben Yehuda died on 28 February 2011 at the age of 82.

== Awards and honours ==
In 2004, Ben Yehuda received the Yakir Yerushalayim (Worthy Citizen of Jerusalem) award from the city of Jerusalem.

== Quote ==
On the subject of the Palmach: "I don't think that there has ever been any other underground movement in the world in which 'male chauvinism' triumphed so powerfully and so proudly".

== Published works ==
- The World Dictionary of Hebrew Slang (with Dahn Ben Amotz), Zmora Bitan, 1972 [Ha-Milon Le-Ivrit Meduberet]
- 1948 – Between Calendars (novel), Keter, 1981 [Ben Ha-Sefirot], part of the Palmach trilogy
- The World Dictionary of Hebrew Slang, Part 2 (with Dahn Ben Amotz), Zmora Bitan, 1982 [Ha-Milon Le-Ivrit Meduberet II]
- Blessings and Curses (writings), Keter, 1984 [Brachot U-Klalot]
- Through the Binding Ropes (novel), Domino, 1985 [Mi-Bead L'Avotot], part of the Palmach trilogy
- Jerusalem from the Inside (novel), Edanim, 1988 [Yerushalayim Mi-Bifnocho]
- Autobiography in Poem and Song (folk songs), Keter, 1991 [Otobiografia Be-Shir U-Zemer]
- When the State of Israel Broke Out (novel), Keter, 1991 [Ke-She Partzah Ha-Medinah], part of the Palmach trilogy
