= Snow in Israel =

Snow events in Israel

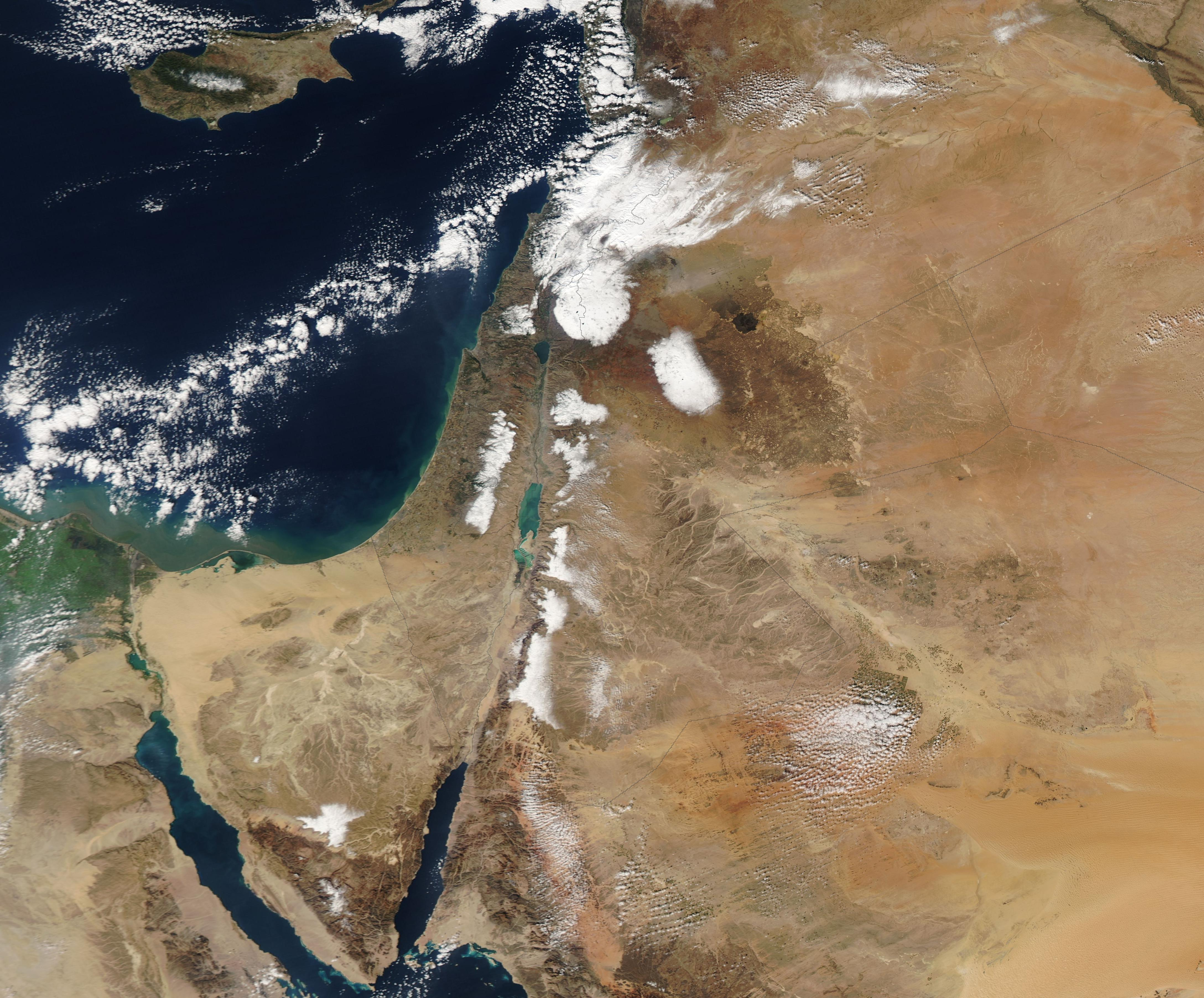
Satellite image of the 2013 Middle East cold snap

Snow in Israel is uncommon, but it occurs in higher elevations; including the northern part of the country and in Jerusalem District. In January and February 1950, Jerusalem experienced the largest snowfall recorded since the beginning of meteorological measurements in 1870. No accumulation of snow has occurred in the Israeli Mediterranean coastal plain and the Dead Sea area since the 1950 snowfalls. Snow is unknown in the vicinity of Eilat, in the southernmost Negev.

== History ==
=== 1934 snowfall ===
No information, image only

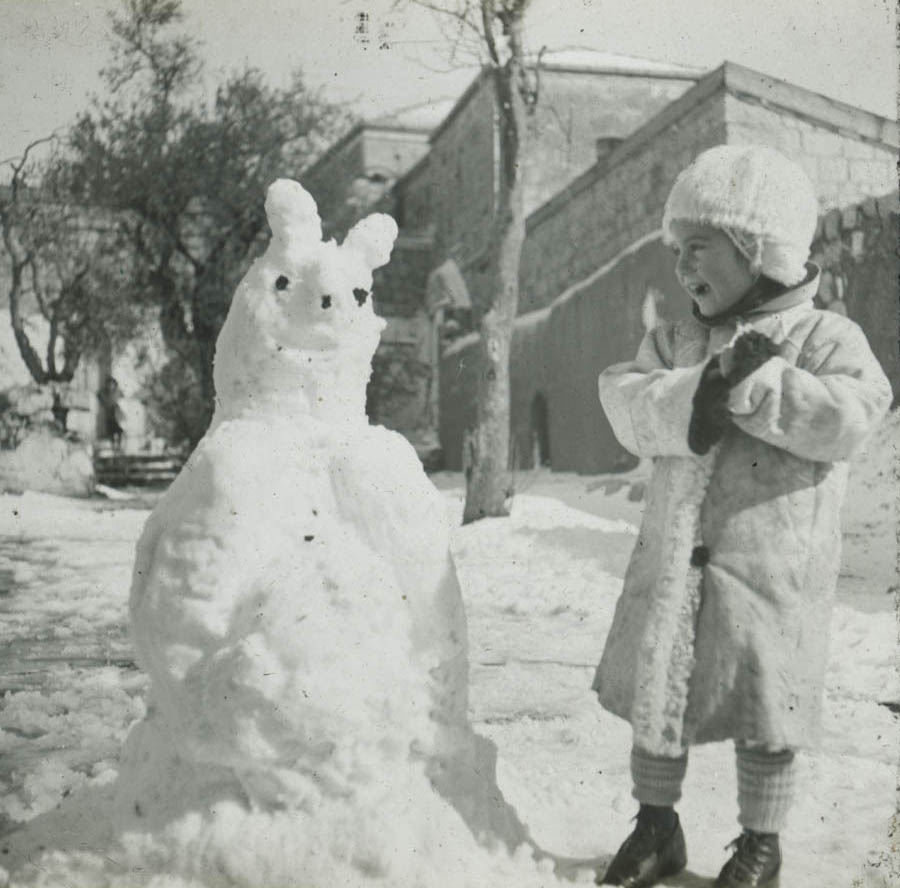
Child with snowman, circa approximately 1934

=== 1950 snowfall ===
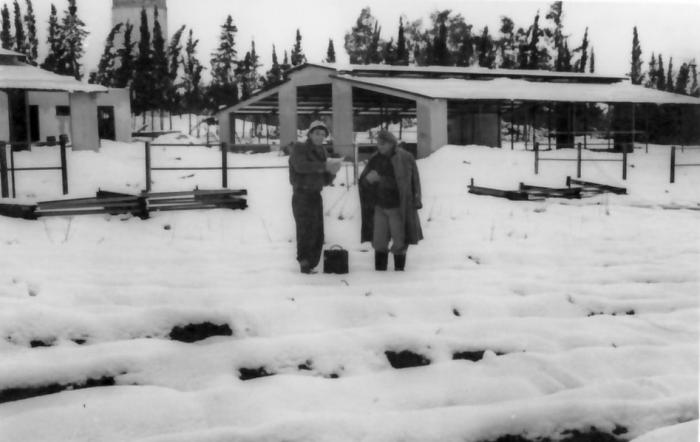
Snow at Kibbutz Gan Shmuel, 1950

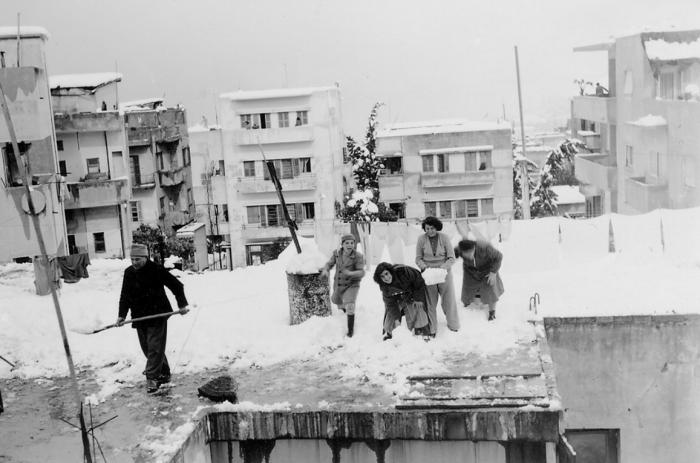
Snow in Haifa, 1950

The snow event began in early January 1950 with a hailstorm in Tel Aviv and light snow in the mountains of the Upper Galilee and Jerusalem. On 27 January, it began to snow in the northern mountains and Jerusalem. It piled up but quickly melted. A cold front spread throughout the country, and snow began falling in the mountains of Samaria and the west. On 28 January it snowed in Haifa and accumulated to 15 cm. Even in Tel Aviv snow fell for several minutes. On 29 January, it snowed again in Haifa, blanketing most of the city in white.

A week later, on 6–7 February, heavy snow began to fall across the country. The depth reached 60 cm in Safed, 100 cm in Jerusalem, 17 cm in Haifa, and 12–19 cm in Tel Aviv, Jaffa and Lod; it also snowed in Petah Tikva, Netanya and Samaria, in Rishon Lezion's streets, on the mountains surrounding the Sea of Galilee, and in the Negev. On 8 February, the snow fell around the Dead Sea, with 8 cm of accumulation reported.

=== 2013 snowfall ===
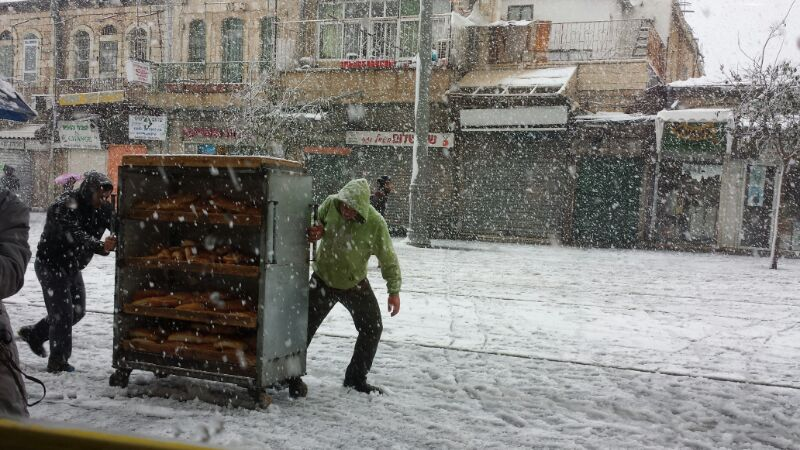
Two people pulling a cart of bread on Jaffa Street in Jerusalem, December 12, 2013

On 13 December 2013, 40–70 cm (16–28 in) of snow fell in Jerusalem and 1 m (3 ft 3 in) in the Kefar Etzion area. Warmer parts of Israel received heavy rains, causing floods. Even though it was the Sabbath, the railway into Jerusalem ran for people stranded by blocked roads.

Roads were closed in Israel by deep snow and flooding. Storm clouds prompted Ben Gurion Airport to shut down, forcing US Secretary of State John Kerry to cut short his meeting with Palestinian President Mahmoud Abbas in Ramallah to return to Israel before roads and airports were out of service. Jerusalem was cut off for 48 hours by deep snow and flooding, and cars were abandoned after they got stuck in snow.

== See also ==
- Climate of Asia
- Geography of Israel
- Israel Meteorological Service
