= Geography of Israel =

- Continent: Asia
- Region: Levant
- Coordinates: 31°N 35°E
- Area: Ranked 150th
  - Total: 20,770 km^{2} (8,020 sq mi)
  - Land: 97.88%
  - Water: 2.12%
- Coastline: 273 km (170 mi)
- Borders: Egypt: 208 km; Jordan: 307 km; Lebanon: 81 km; Syria: 83 km; West Bank: 330 km; Gaza Strip: 59 km; Coastlines: 273 km
- Highest point: Mount Meron
- Lowest point: Dead Sea
- Longest river: Jordan River
- Largest lake: Sea of Galilee
- Climate: Mediterranean
- Natural resources: Offshore gas fields, Dead Sea minerals (potash, magnesium)
- Exclusive economic zone: 26,352 km^{2} (10,175 mi^{2})

The geography of Israel is very diverse, with desert conditions in the south, and snow-capped mountains in the north. Israel is located at the eastern end of the Mediterranean Sea in West Asia. It is bounded to the north by Lebanon, the northeast by Syria, the east by Jordan and the West Bank, and to the southwest by Egypt. To the west of Israel is the Mediterranean Sea, which makes up the majority of Israel's 273 km (170 mi) coastline, and the Gaza Strip. Israel has a small coastline on the Red Sea in the south.

Israel's area is approximately 20,770 km^{2} (8,019 sq mi), which includes 445 km^{2} (172 sq mi) of inland water. Israel stretches 424 km (263 mi) from north to south, and its width ranges from 114 km (71 mi) at its widest point to 10 km (6.2 mi) at its narrowest point. It has an Exclusive Economic Zone of 26,352 km^{2} (10,175 mi^{2}).

The Israeli-occupied territories include the West Bank, 5,879 km^{2} (2,270 sq mi), East Jerusalem, 70 km^{2} (27 sq mi) and the Golan Heights, 1,150 km^{2} (444 sq mi). Geographical features in these territories will be noted as such. Of these areas, Israel has annexed East Jerusalem and the Golan Heights, an act not recognized by the international community.

Southern Israel is dominated by the Negev desert, covering some 16,000 square kilometres (6,178 sq mi), more than half of the country's total land area. The north of the Negev contains the Judean Desert, which, at its border with Jordan, contains the Dead Sea which, at −417 m (−1,368 ft) is the lowest point on Earth. The inland area of central Israel is dominated by the Judean Hills of the West Bank, whilst the central and northern coastline consists of the flat and fertile Israeli coastal plain. Inland, the northern region contains the Mount Carmel mountain range, which is followed inland by the fertile Jezreel Valley, and then the hilly Galilee region. The Sea of Galilee is located beyond this region and is bordered to the east by the Golan Heights, a plateau bordered to the north by the Israeli-occupied part of the Mount Hermon massif, which includes the highest point under Israel's control, a peak of 2,224 meters (7,297 ft). The highest point in territory internationally recognized as Israeli is Mount Meron at 1,208 meters (3,963 ft).

== Location and boundaries ==
Israel on the world map

Israel Districts and Capitals

Israel lies to the north of the equator around 31°30' north latitude and 34°45' east longitude. It measures 424 km (263 mi) from north to south and, at its widest point 114 km (71 mi), from east to west. At its narrowest point, however, this is reduced to just 15 km (9 mi). It has a land frontier of 1,017 km (632 mi) and a coastline of 273 km (170 mi). It is ranked 153 on the List of countries and outlying territories by total area.

Prior to the establishment of the British Mandate for Palestine, there was no clear-cut definition of the geographical and territorial limits of the area known as "Palestine." On the eve of World War I it was described by Encyclopædia Britannica as a "nebulous geographical concept." The Sykes-Picot Treaty in 1916 divided the region that later became Palestine into four political units. Under the British Mandate for Palestine, the first geo-political framework was created that distinguished the area from the larger countries that surrounded it. The boundary demarcation at this time did not introduce geographical changes near the frontiers and both sides of the border were controlled by the British administration.

Modern Israel is bounded to the north by Lebanon, the northeast by Syria, the east by Jordan and the West Bank, and to the southwest by Egypt. To the west of Israel is the Mediterranean Sea, which makes up the majority of Israel's 273 km (170 mi) coastline and the Gaza Strip. Israel has a small coastline on the Red Sea in the south. The southernmost settlement in Israel is the city of Eilat whilst the northernmost is the town of Metula. The territorial waters of Israel extend into the sea to a distance of twelve nautical miles measured from the appropriate baseline.

The statistics provided by the Israel Central Bureau of Statistics include the annexed East Jerusalem and Golan Heights, but exclude the West Bank and Gaza Strip. The population of Israel includes Israeli settlers in the West Bank. The route of the Israeli West Bank barrier incorporates some parts of the West Bank.

Name	Status Description	Population (thousands)				Area (km^{2})	
Name	Status Description	Israelis (incl. Israeli Jews and Israeli Arabs in Israel proper, and incl. Israeli settlers in the Israeli-occupied territories)	Cumulative Total	Palestinians (incl. non-Israeli Palestinians residing legally in Israel)	Cumulative Total	Area	Cumulative Total
Israel (Green Line)	Area sovereign to Israel since 1948	6,674	6,674	100–120	100–120	20,582	20,582
East Jerusalem	Occupied and subject to Israeli law since 1967. Formal legislation on 1980 (see Jerusalem Law)	455	7,129	225 (double counted)	225	336	20,918
Golan Heights	Occupied since 1967, subject to Israeli law since 1981 (see Golan Heights Law)	42	7,172	n.a.	n.a. (Syrians)	1,154	22,072
Seam Zone (West Bank)	Area between the Green Line and the Israeli West Bank barrier. Occupied in 1967	188	7,359	35	260	200	22,272
Other Israeli settlements and IDF Military Areas (West Bank Area C)	Other Israeli settlements (not in East Jerusalem or the Seam Zone) and areas in the West Bank directly controlled by the IDF. Occupied in 1967	57	7,473	115	375	2,961	25,233
Palestinian civil control (West Bank Areas A+B)	Palestinian National Authority civil controlled area. Subject to "joint" military control with the IDF. Occupied in 1967	0	7,473	2,311	2,686	2,143	27,376
Gaza Strip	Palestinian governed area. Israel controls airspace, maritime border and its own border with Gaza. Occupied in 1967, unilaterally disengaged in 2005, declared a foreign entity in 2007.	0	7,473	1,552	4,238	360	27,736

== Physiographic regions ==

Israel is divided into four physiographic regions: the Mediterranean coastal plain, the Central Hills, the Jordan Rift Valley and the Negev Desert.

=== Coastal plain ===
The Israeli Coastal Plain stretches from the Lebanese border in the north to Gaza in the south, interrupted only by Cape Carmel at Haifa Bay. It is about 40 kilometers (25 mi) wide at Gaza and narrows toward the north to about 5 kilometers (3.1 mi) at the Lebanese border. The region is fertile and humid (historically malarial) and is known for its citrus orchards and viticulture. The plain is traversed by several short streams. From north to south these are: Kishon, Hadera, Alexander, Poleg, and Yarkon. All of these streams were badly polluted, but in the last ten years much work has been done to clean them up. Today the Kishon, Alexander and Yarkon again flow year round, and also have parks along their banks.

Geographically, the region is divided into five sub-regions. The northernmost section lays between the Lebanese border, the Western Galilee to the east, and the sea. It stretches from Rosh HaNikra in the north and down to Haifa, Israel's third-largest city. It is a fertile region, and off the coast there are many small islands. Along the Mount Carmel range is Hof HaCarmel, or the Carmel Coastal Plain. It stretches from the point where Mount Carmel almost touches the sea, at Haifa, and down to Nahal Taninim, a stream that marks the southern limit of the Carmel range. The Sharon Plain is the next section, running from Nahal Taninim (south of Zikhron Ya'akov) to Tel Aviv's Yarkon River. This area is Israel's most densely populated. South of this, running to Nahal Shikma, is the Central Coastal Plain, also known as the Western Negev. The last segment is the Southern Coastal Plain, which extends south around the Gaza Strip. It is divided into two – in the north, the Besor region, a savanna-type area with a relatively large number of communities, and south of it the Agur-Halutza region, which is very sparsely populated.

=== Central hills ===
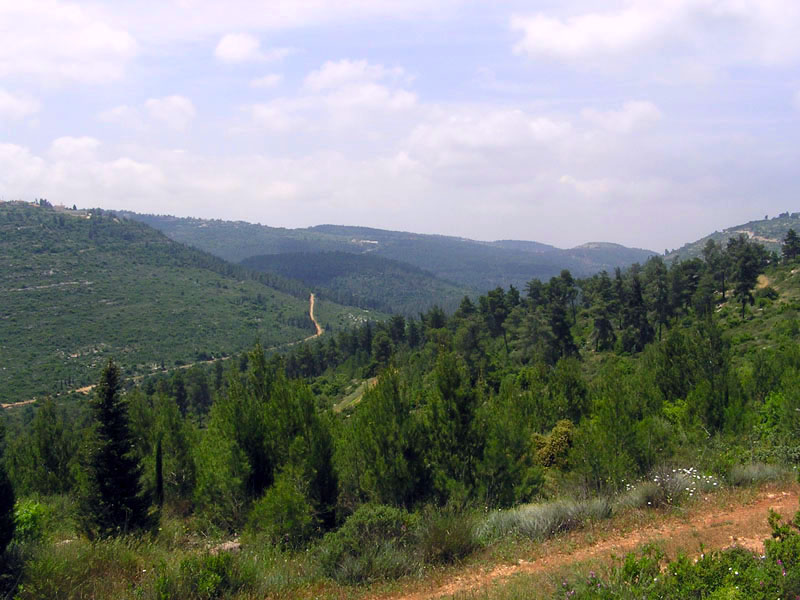
Judaean Mountains

Inland (east) of the coastal plain lies the central highland region. In the north of this region lie the mountains and hills of Upper Galilee and Lower Galilee, which are generally 500 to 700 meters (1,640 to 2,297 ft) in height, although they reach a maximum height of 1,208 meters (3,963 ft) at Mount Meron. South of the Galilee, in the West Bank, are the Samarian Hills with numerous small, fertile valleys rarely reaching the height of 800 meters (2,625 ft). South of Jerusalem, also mainly within the West Bank, are the Judean Hills, including Mount Hebron. The central highlands average 610 meters (2,001 ft) in height and reach their highest elevation at Har Meron, at 1,208 meters (3,963 ft), in Galilee near Safed. Several valleys cut across the highlands roughly from east to west; the largest is the Jezreel Valley (also known as the Plain of Esdraelon), which stretches 48 kilometers (30 mi) from Haifa southeast to the valley of the Jordan River, and is 19 kilometers (12 mi) across at its widest point.

=== Jordan Rift Valley ===
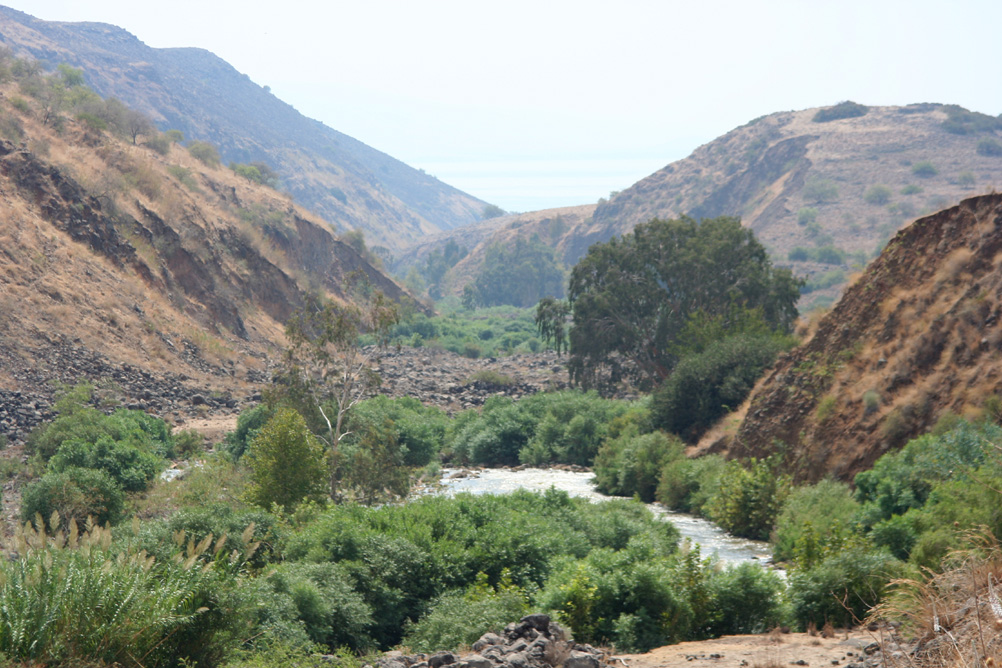
Jordan Rift Valley

East of the central highlands lies the Jordan Rift Valley, which is a small part of the 6,500 kilometers (4,039 mi)-long Syrian-East African Rift. In Israel the Rift Valley is dominated by the Jordan River, the Sea of Galilee (an important freshwater source also known as Lake Tiberias and Lake Kinneret), and the Dead Sea. The Jordan, Israel's largest river (322 kilometers (200 mi)), originates in the Dan, Baniyas, and Hasbani rivers near Mount Hermon in the Anti-Lebanon Mountains and flows south through the drained Hula Basin into the freshwater Lake Tiberias. Lake Tiberias is 165 square kilometers (64 sq mi) in size and, depending on the season and rainfall, is at about 213 meters (699 ft) below sea level. With a water capacity estimated at 3 cubic kilometers (0.72 cu mi), it serves as the principal reservoir of the National Water Carrier (also known as the Kinneret-Negev Conduit). The Jordan River continues its course from the southern end of Lake Tiberias (forming the boundary between the West Bank and Jordan) to its terminus in the highly saline Dead Sea. The Dead Sea is 1,020 square kilometers (394 sq mi) in size and, at 420 meters (1,378 ft) below sea level, is the lowest surface point on the earth. South of the Dead Sea, the Rift Valley continues in the Arabah (Hebrew "Arava", Arabic "Wadi 'Arabah"), which has no permanent water flow, for 170 kilometers (106 mi) to the Gulf of Eilat.

=== Negev Desert ===
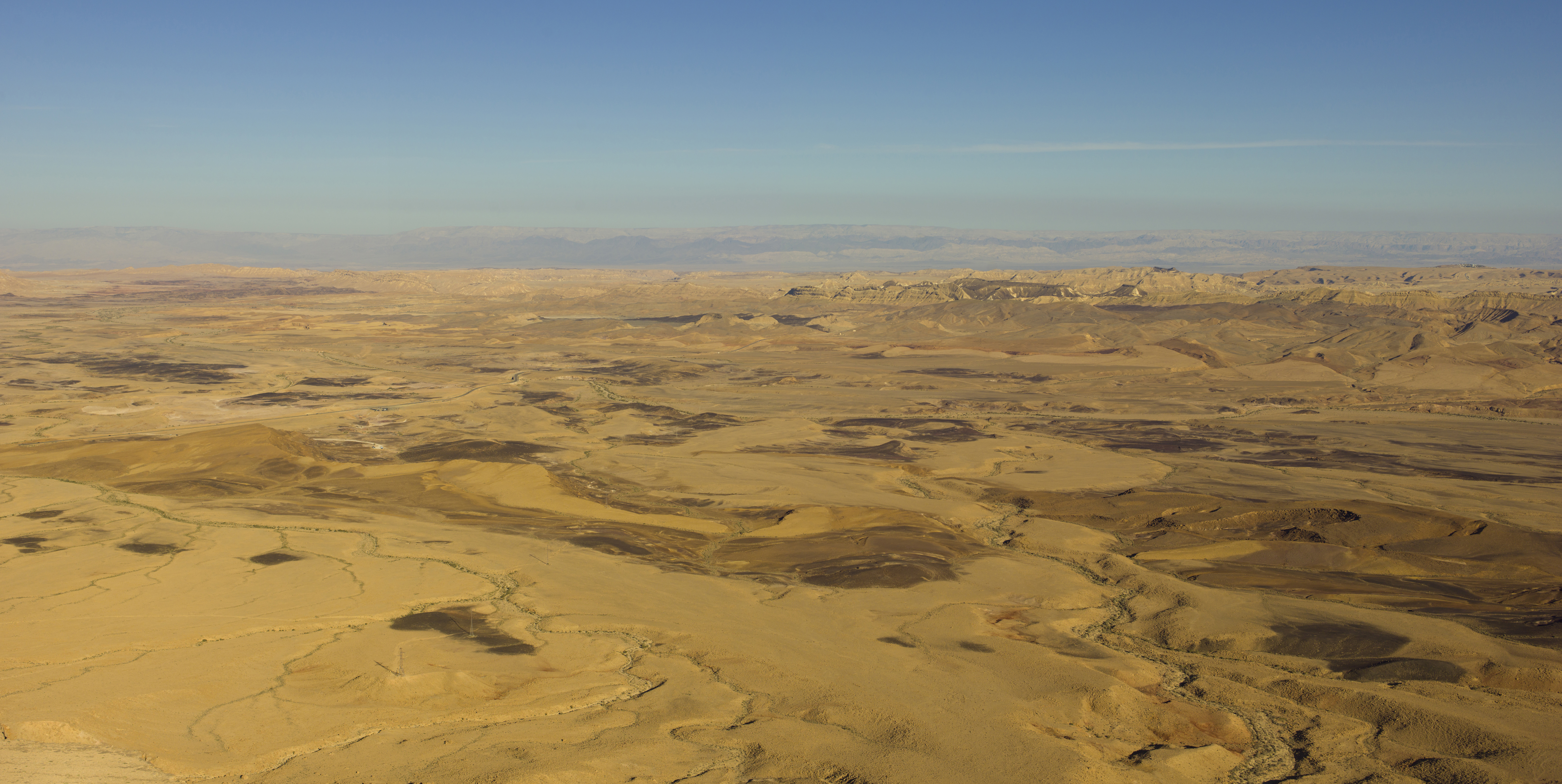
Makhtesh Ramon

The Negev Desert comprises approximately 12,000 square kilometers (4,633 sq mi), more than half of Israel's total land area. Geographically it is an extension of the Sinai Desert, forming a rough triangle with its base in the north near Beersheba, the Dead Sea, and the southern Judean Mountains, and it has its apex in the southern tip of the country at Eilat. Topographically, it parallels the other regions of the country, with lowlands in the west, hills in the central portion, and the Arava valley as its eastern border.

Unique to the Negev region are the craterlike makhteshim cirques; Makhtesh Ramon, Makhtesh Gadol and Makhtesh Katan. The Negev is also sub-divided into five different ecological regions: northern, western and central Negev, the high plateau and the Arabah Valley. The northern Negev receives 300 millimeters (11.8 in) of rain annually and has fairly fertile soils. The western Negev receives 250 millimeters (9.8 in) of rain per year, with light and partially sandy soils. The central Negev has an annual precipitation of 200 millimeters (7.9 in) and is characterized by impervious soil, allowing minimum penetration of water with greater soil erosion and water runoff. This can result in rare flash floods during heavy rains as water runs across the surface of the impervious desert soil. The high plateau area of Ramat HaNegev stands between 370 and 520 meters (1,214 and 1,706 ft) above sea level with extreme temperatures in summer and winter. The area gets 100 millimeters (3.9 in) of rain each year, with inferior and partially salty soils. The Arabah Valley along the Jordanian border stretches 180 kilometers (112 mi) from Eilat in the south to the tip of the Dead Sea in the north and is very arid with barely 50 millimeters (1.97 in) of rain annually.

== Geology ==
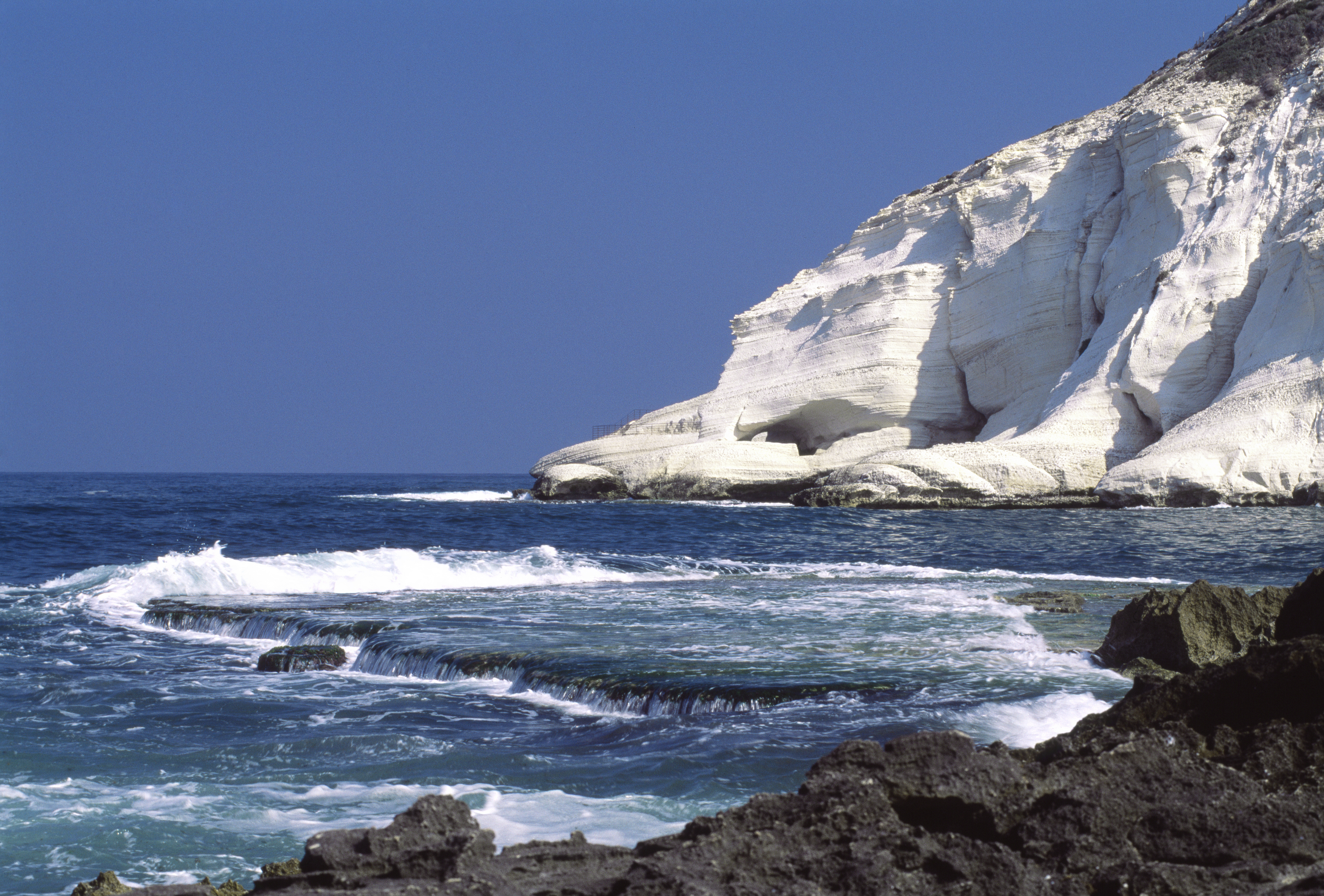
Rosh HaNikra chalk cliff

Israel is divided east–west by a mountain range running north to south along the coast. Jerusalem sits on the top of this ridge, east of which lies the Dead Sea graben which is a pull-apart basin on the Dead Sea Transform fault.

The numerous limestone and sandstone layers of the Israeli mountains serve as aquifers through which water flows from the west flank to the east. Several springs have formed along the Dead Sea, each an oasis, most notably the oases at Ein Gedi and Ein Bokek (Neve Zohar) where settlements have developed. Israel also has a number of areas of karst topography. Caves in the region have been used for thousands of years as shelter, storage rooms, barns and as places of public gatherings.

The far northern coastline of the country has some chalk landscapes best seen at Rosh HaNikra, a chalk cliff into which a series of grottoes have been eroded.

=== Seismic activity ===
The Jordan Rift Valley is the result of tectonic movements within the Dead Sea Transform (DSF) fault system. The DSF forms the transform boundary between the African Plate to the west and the Arabian Plate to the east. The Golan Heights and all of Jordan are part of the Arabian Plate, while the Galilee, West Bank, Coastal Plain, and Negev along with the Sinai Peninsula are on the African Plate. This tectonic disposition leads to a relatively high seismic activity in the region.

The entire Jordan Valley segment is thought to have ruptured repeatedly, for instance during the last two major earthquakes along this structure in 749 and 1033. The deficit in slip that has built up since the 1033 event is sufficient to cause an earthquake of M_{w}~7.4.

The most catastrophic earthquakes occurred in 31 BCE, 363, 749, and 1033 CE, that is every ca. 400 years on average. Destructive earthquakes leading to serious loss of life strike about every 80 years. While stringent construction regulations are currently in place and recently built structures are earthquake-safe, as of 2007 the majority of the buildings in Israel were older than these regulations and many public buildings as well as 50,000 residential buildings did not meet the new standards and were "expected to collapse" if exposed to a strong quake. Given the fragile political situation of the Middle East region and the presence there of major holy sites, a quake reaching magnitude 7 on the Richter scale could have dire consequences for world peace.

== Rivers and lakes ==
Israel is the sixteenth most water stressed country in the world.

Israel's longest and most famous river is the 320-kilometre (199 mi) long River Jordan, which rises on the southern slopes of Mount Hermon in the Anti-Lebanon Mountains. The river flows south through the freshwater Sea of Galilee, and from there forms the boundary with the Kingdom of Jordan for much of its route, eventually emptying into the Dead Sea. The northern tributaries to the Jordan are the Dan, Banias, and Hasbani. Only the Dan is within undisputed Israel; the Hasbani flows from Lebanon and the Banias from territory captured from Syria in the Six-Day War.

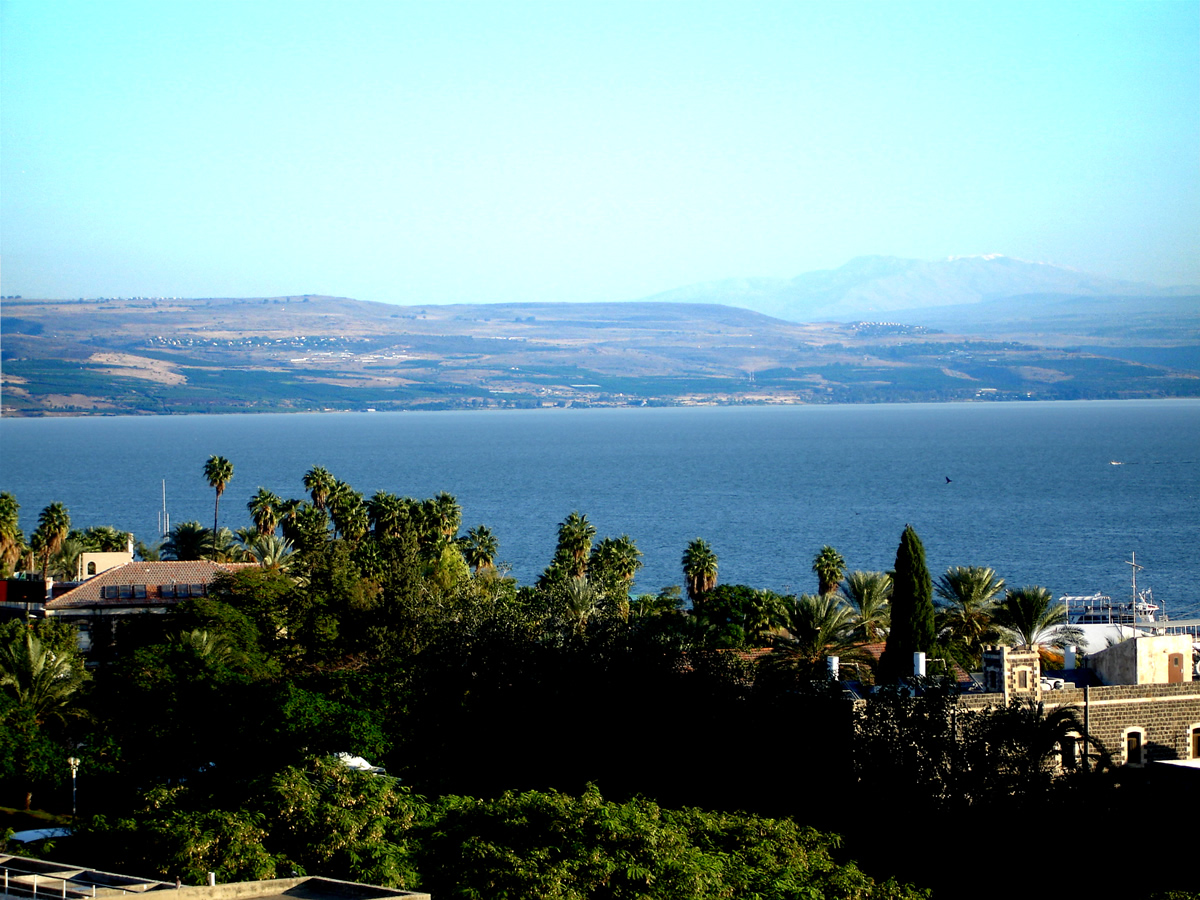
Lake Kinneret

The Sea of Galilee (also called the Kinneret) is Israel's largest and most important freshwater lake, located in the northeast of the country. The pear-shaped lake is 23 kilometres (14 mi) long from north to south, with a maximum width of 13 kilometres (8 mi) in the north, covering 166 square kilometers (64 sq mi). The Kinneret lies 207 meters (679 ft) below sea level and reaches depths of 46 meters (151 ft). In a previous geological epoch the lake was part of a large inland sea which extended from the Hula marshes in northern Israel to 64 kilometers (40 mi) south of the Dead Sea. The bed of the lake forms part of the Jordan Rift Valley.

South of the Kinneret lies the saltwater Dead Sea which forms the border between Israel and Jordan and is 418 meters (1,371 ft) below sea level, making it the lowest water surface on Earth. The Dead Sea is 67 kilometers (42 mi) long with a maximum width of 16 kilometers (10 mi) and also makes up part of the Rift Valley. A peninsula juts out into the lake from the eastern shore, south of which the lake is shallow, less than 6 meters (19.7 ft) deep. To the north is the lake's greatest depth.

There are no navigable, artificial waterways in Israel, although the National Water Carrier, a conduit for drinking water, might be classified as such. The idea of a channel connecting the Mediterranean and Dead Seas or the Red and Dead Seas has been discussed.

== Selected elevations ==
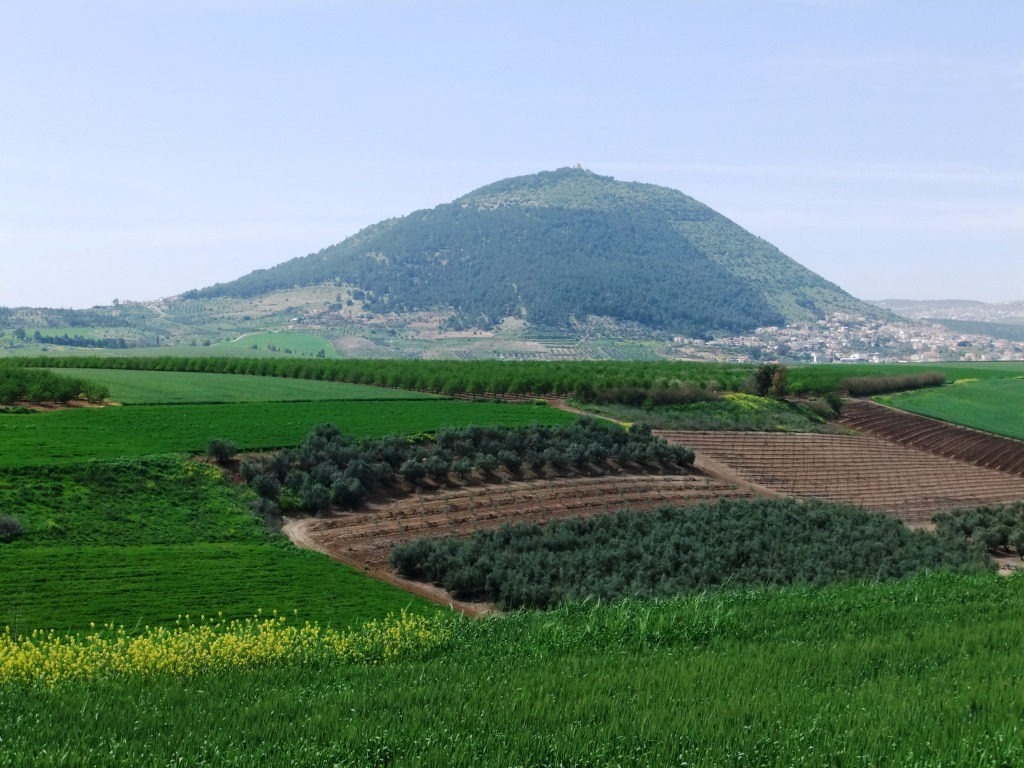
Mount Tabor

The following are selected elevations of notable locations, from highest to lowest:

Location	Region	Elevation (feet)	Elevation (meters)
Mount Hermon	Golan Heights (Israeli-occupied)	7,336 ft.	2,236 m.
Mount Meron	Upper Galilee	3,964 ft.	1,208 m.
Mount Ramon	Negev	3,396 ft.	1,035 m.
Mount of Olives	East Jerusalem (Israeli-occupied)	2,739 ft.	835 m.
Mount Tabor	Lower Galilee	1,930 ft.	588 m.
Mount Carmel	Haifa	1,792 ft.	546 m.
Dead Sea	Judean Desert	– 1,368 ft.	– 417 m.

== Climate ==
Map of Köppen-Geiger climate classification zones for Israel and the Israeli occupied Golan Heights

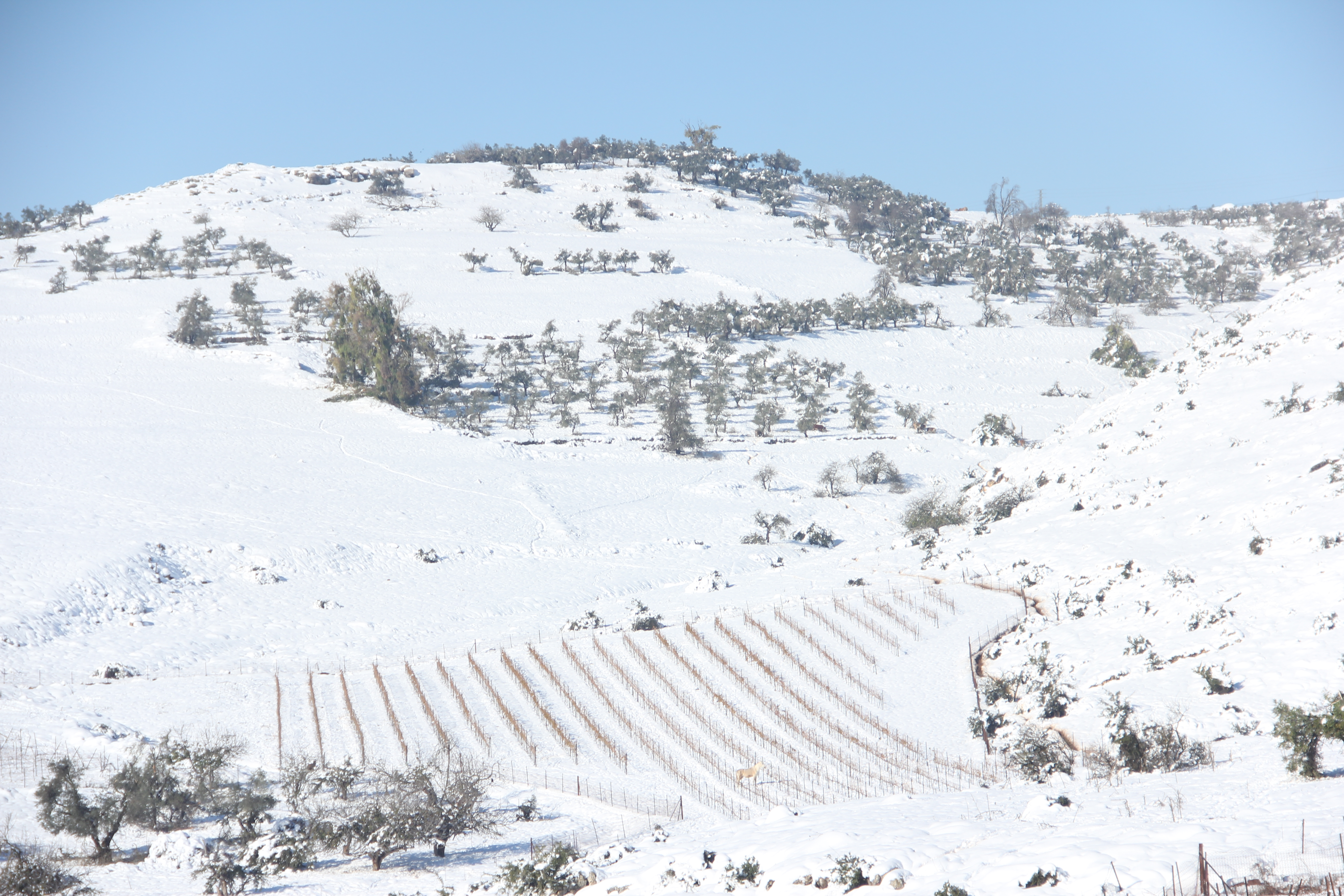
Snow in Galilee

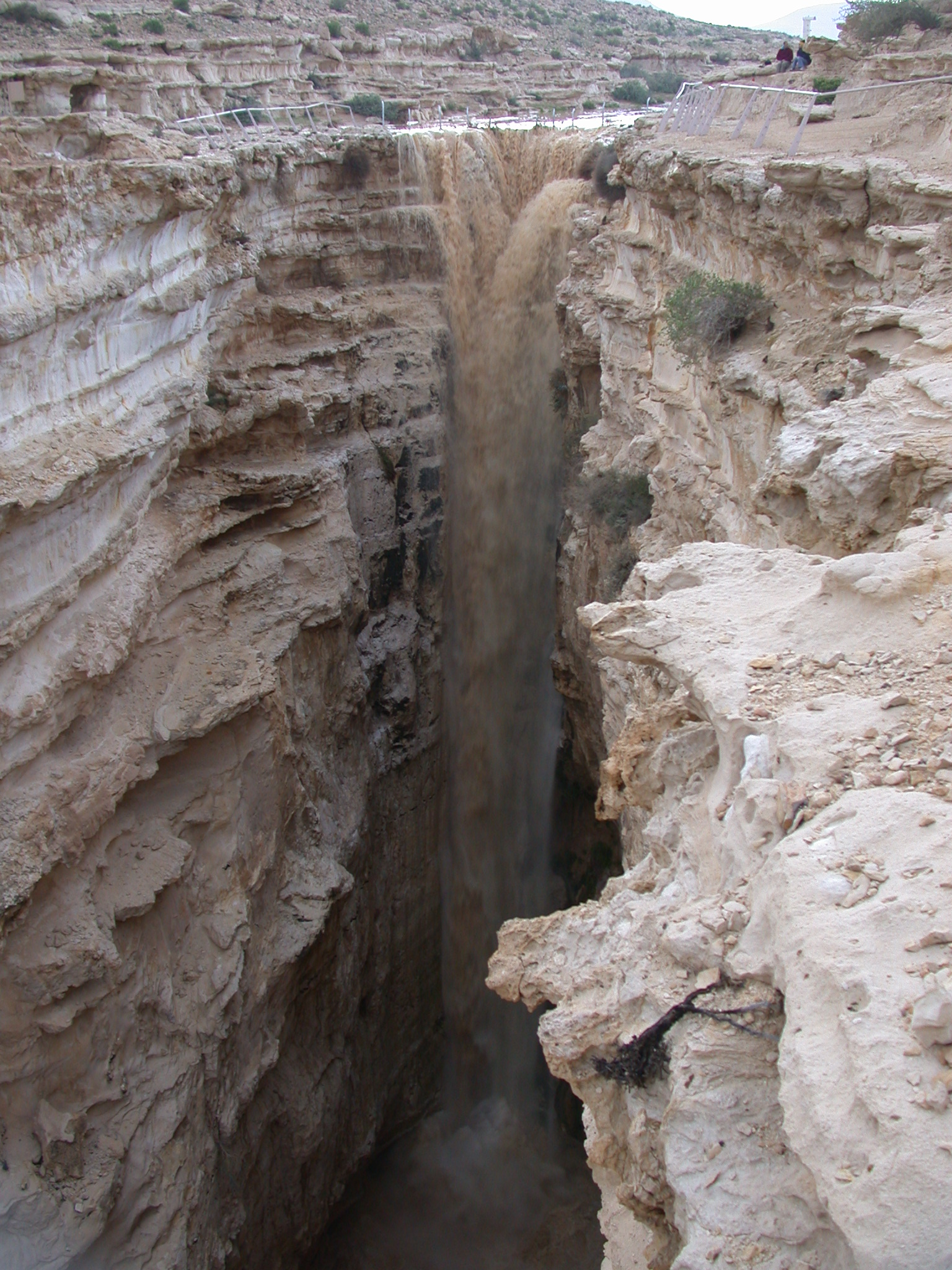
Flash flood at Ein Avdat

The northern half of Israel has a Mediterranean climate with long, hot, rainless summers and relatively short, mild to cool, rainy winters (Köppen climate classification Csa). The southern half has hot semi-arid (BSh) and hot desert (BWh) climates. The climate is as such due to Israel's location between the subtropical aridity of the Sahara and the Arabian deserts, and the subtropical humidity of the Levant and Eastern Mediterranean. The climate conditions are highly variable within the state and modified locally by altitude, latitude, and the proximity to the Mediterranean.

On average, January is the coldest month with average temperatures ranging from 6 to 15 °C (42.8 to 59.0 °F), and July and August are the hottest months at 22 to 33 °C (71.6 to 91.4 °F), on average across the country. Summers are very humid along the Mediterranean coast but dry in the central highlands, the Rift Valley, and the Negev Desert. In Eilat, a desert city, summer daytime-temperatures are often the highest in the state, at times reaching 44 to 46 °C (111.2 to 114.8 °F). More than 70% of the average rainfall in Israel falls between November and March; June through September are usually rainless. Rainfall is unevenly distributed, significantly lower in the south of the country. In the extreme south, rainfall averages near 30 millimeters (1.18 in) annually; in the north, average annual rainfall exceeds 900 millimeters (35.4 in). Rainfall varies from season to season and from year to year, particularly in the Negev Desert. Precipitation is often concentrated in violent storms, causing erosion and flash floods. In winter, precipitation often takes the form of snow at the higher elevations of the central highlands, including Jerusalem. Mount Hermon has seasonal snow which covers all three of its peaks in winter and spring. In rare occasions, snow gets to the northern mountain peaks and only in extremely rare occasions even to the coast. The areas of the country most cultivated are those receiving more than 300 millimeters (11.8 in) of rainfall annually, making approximately one-third of the country cultivable.

Thunderstorms and hail are common throughout the rainy season and waterspouts occasionally hit the Mediterranean coast, capable of causing only minor damage. However, supercell thunderstorms and a true F2 tornado hit the Western Galilee in April 2006, causing significant damage and 75 injuries.

Heat waves are frequent. 2010 was the hottest year in the history of Israel with absolute record high in several places in August. The heat became stronger from August when temperatures were considerably above the average. October and November were also dry, and November was almost rainless when it was supposed to be rainy.

=== Climate charts of different locations in Israel ===

Climate data for Tel Aviv (Temperature: 1987–2010, Precipitation: 1980–2010)
Month	Jan	Feb	Mar	Apr	May	Jun	Jul	Aug	Sep	Oct	Nov	Dec	Year
Record high °C (°F)	30.0 (86.0)	33.2 (91.8)	38.3 (100.9)	43.9 (111.0)	46.5 (115.7)	44.4 (111.9)	37.4 (99.3)	41.4 (106.5)	42.0 (107.6)	44.4 (111.9)	35.6 (96.1)	33.5 (92.3)	46.5 (115.7)
Mean maximum °C (°F)	23.6 (74.5)	25.0 (77.0)	30.4 (86.7)	35.5 (95.9)	32.4 (90.3)	30.8 (87.4)	31.6 (88.9)	31.8 (89.2)	32.0 (89.6)	32.9 (91.2)	29.2 (84.6)	23.8 (74.8)	35.5 (95.9)
Mean daily maximum °C (°F)	17.5 (63.5)	17.7 (63.9)	19.2 (66.6)	22.8 (73.0)	24.9 (76.8)	27.5 (81.5)	29.4 (84.9)	30.2 (86.4)	29.4 (84.9)	27.3 (81.1)	23.4 (74.1)	19.2 (66.6)	24.0 (75.3)
Daily mean °C (°F)	12.9 (55.2)	13.4 (56.1)	16.4 (61.5)	19.2 (66.6)	21.8 (71.2)	24.8 (76.6)	27.0 (80.6)	27.8 (82.0)	26.5 (79.7)	22.7 (72.9)	17.6 (63.7)	13.9 (57.0)	20.3 (68.6)
Mean daily minimum °C (°F)	9.6 (49.3)	9.8 (49.6)	11.5 (52.7)	14.4 (57.9)	17.3 (63.1)	20.6 (69.1)	23.0 (73.4)	23.7 (74.7)	22.5 (72.5)	19.1 (66.4)	14.6 (58.3)	11.2 (52.2)	16.4 (61.6)
Mean minimum °C (°F)	6.6 (43.9)	7.3 (45.1)	8.3 (46.9)	10.7 (51.3)	14.0 (57.2)	18.3 (64.9)	22.2 (72.0)	23.3 (73.9)	20.6 (69.1)	16.2 (61.2)	10.9 (51.6)	7.8 (46.0)	6.6 (43.9)
Average rainfall mm (inches)	147 (5.8)	111 (4.4)	62 (2.4)	16 (0.6)	4 (0.2)	0 (0)	0 (0)	0 (0)	1 (0.0)	34 (1.3)	81 (3.2)	127 (5.0)	583 (22.9)
Average rainy days (≥ 0.1 mm)	15	13	10	4	2	0	0	0	0	6	9	12	71
Average relative humidity (%) (at 1200 GMT)	72	70	65	60	63	67	70	67	60	65	68	73	67
Mean monthly sunshine hours	192.2	200.1	235.6	270.0	328.6	357.0	368.9	356.5	300.0	279.0	234.0	189.1	3,311
Source 1: Israel Meteorological Service
Source 2: Hong Kong Observatory for data of sunshine hours

Climate data for Beit Dagan (1991-2020)
Month	Jan	Feb	Mar	Apr	May	Jun	Jul	Aug	Sep	Oct	Nov	Dec	Year
Record high °C (°F)	28.6 (83.5)	32.6 (90.7)	37.8 (100.0)	40.9 (105.6)	43.5 (110.3)	43.0 (109.4)	41.5 (106.7)	38.4 (101.1)	41.9 (107.4)	41.5 (106.7)	36.2 (97.2)	30.2 (86.4)	43.5 (110.3)
Mean daily maximum °C (°F)	17.8 (64.0)	18.8 (65.8)	21.3 (70.3)	24.6 (76.3)	27.6 (81.7)	29.7 (85.5)	31.4 (88.5)	32.0 (89.6)	31.0 (87.8)	28.9 (84.0)	24.6 (76.3)	19.9 (67.8)	25.6 (78.1)
Daily mean °C (°F)	12.9 (55.2)	13.6 (56.5)	15.9 (60.6)	18.9 (66.0)	22.0 (71.6)	24.8 (76.6)	26.9 (80.4)	27.5 (81.5)	26.1 (79.0)	23.4 (74.1)	18.9 (66.0)	14.8 (58.6)	20.5 (68.9)
Mean daily minimum °C (°F)	8.0 (46.4)	8.4 (47.1)	10.4 (50.7)	13.1 (55.6)	16.4 (61.5)	19.8 (67.6)	22.3 (72.1)	23.0 (73.4)	21.2 (70.2)	17.8 (64.0)	13.2 (55.8)	9.6 (49.3)	15.3 (59.5)
Record low °C (°F)	−1.4 (29.5)	−0.8 (30.6)	2.2 (36.0)	3.1 (37.6)	9.4 (48.9)	12.5 (54.5)	16.4 (61.5)	17.6 (63.7)	10.8 (51.4)	9.9 (49.8)	1.5 (34.7)	0.9 (33.6)	−1.4 (29.5)
Average precipitation mm (inches)	140.5 (5.53)	96.9 (3.81)	66.1 (2.60)	17.5 (0.69)	2.2 (0.09)	0 (0)	0 (0)	0 (0)	0.4 (0.02)	20.4 (0.80)	76.2 (3.00)	130.3 (5.13)	550.5 (21.67)
Mean monthly sunshine hours	181.7	184.0	241.8	277.8	326.9	352.0	362.0	332.7	288.8	263.7	213.7	181.2	3,206.3
Source 1: NOAA, DWD
Source 2: Israel Meteorological Service (precipitation)

Climate data for Jerusalem (1991–2020 normals)
Month	Jan	Feb	Mar	Apr	May	Jun	Jul	Aug	Sep	Oct	Nov	Dec	Year
Record high °C (°F)	24.4 (75.9)	27.5 (81.5)	32.7 (90.9)	35.6 (96.1)	38.6 (101.5)	38.4 (101.1)	40.6 (105.1)	44.4 (111.9)	42.7 (108.9)	36.5 (97.7)	32.6 (90.7)	28.5 (83.3)	44.4 (111.9)
Mean daily maximum °C (°F)	12.7 (54.9)	14.0 (57.2)	17.4 (63.3)	22.0 (71.6)	26.2 (79.2)	28.6 (83.5)	30.0 (86.0)	30.3 (86.5)	28.9 (84.0)	25.9 (78.6)	19.9 (67.8)	14.9 (58.8)	22.6 (72.6)
Daily mean °C (°F)	9.8 (49.6)	10.7 (51.3)	13.4 (56.1)	17.3 (63.1)	21.2 (70.2)	23.5 (74.3)	25.0 (77.0)	25.3 (77.5)	24.0 (75.2)	21.6 (70.9)	16.4 (61.5)	11.9 (53.4)	18.3 (65.0)
Mean daily minimum °C (°F)	6.7 (44.1)	7.3 (45.1)	9.5 (49.1)	12.5 (54.5)	16.2 (61.2)	18.3 (64.9)	20.0 (68.0)	20.2 (68.4)	19.1 (66.4)	17.3 (63.1)	12.9 (55.2)	8.8 (47.8)	14.1 (57.3)
Record low °C (°F)	−6.7 (19.9)	−2.5 (27.5)	−0.3 (31.5)	0.8 (33.4)	7.6 (45.7)	11.0 (51.8)	14.6 (58.3)	15.5 (59.9)	13.2 (55.8)	9.8 (49.6)	1.8 (35.2)	−0.4 (31.3)	−6.7 (19.9)
Average precipitation mm (inches)	136.8 (5.39)	117.9 (4.64)	67.2 (2.65)	21.8 (0.86)	7.1 (0.28)	0.3 (0.01)	0.0 (0.0)	0.0 (0.0)	0.7 (0.03)	10.3 (0.41)	51.1 (2.01)	112.3 (4.42)	525.5 (20.7)
Average precipitation days (≥ 1 mm)	9.2	8.5	6.2	2.4	0.8	0.0	0.0	0.0	0.2	1.9	4.7	7.7	41.6
Average relative humidity (%)	61	59	52	39	35	37	40	40	40	42	48	56	46
Mean monthly sunshine hours	192.9	243.6	226.3	266.6	331.7	381.0	384.4	365.8	309.0	275.9	228.0	192.2	3,397.4
Source 1: Israel Meteorological Service (records until 1990)
Source 2: NOAA (normal values & records, 1991–2020) (sun, 1961–1990)

Climate data for Haifa (5 m / 16 ft) (Temperature: 1995–2010, Extremes 1898–2011, Precipitation: 1980–2010)
Month	Jan	Feb	Mar	Apr	May	Jun	Jul	Aug	Sep	Oct	Nov	Dec	Year
Record high °C (°F)	27.0 (80.6)	30.4 (86.7)	38.0 (100.4)	42.5 (108.5)	44.6 (112.3)	43.5 (110.3)	37.8 (100.0)	37.8 (100.0)	41.8 (107.2)	41.4 (106.5)	36.0 (96.8)	31.5 (88.7)	44.6 (112.3)
Mean maximum °C (°F)	22.6 (72.7)	25.0 (77.0)	29.9 (85.8)	35.5 (95.9)	36.2 (97.2)	34.6 (94.3)	35.2 (95.4)	34.1 (93.4)	34.7 (94.5)	35.4 (95.7)	30.3 (86.5)	24.7 (76.5)	36.2 (97.2)
Mean daily maximum °C (°F)	17.8 (64.0)	18.6 (65.5)	20.9 (69.6)	23.8 (74.8)	26.5 (79.7)	29.5 (85.1)	31.6 (88.9)	31.6 (88.9)	30.2 (86.4)	27.9 (82.2)	24.4 (75.9)	19.8 (67.6)	25.2 (77.4)
Daily mean °C (°F)	13.9 (57.0)	14.4 (57.9)	16.5 (61.7)	19.4 (66.9)	22.4 (72.3)	25.7 (78.3)	28.0 (82.4)	28.4 (83.1)	26.7 (80.1)	23.7 (74.7)	19.8 (67.6)	15.8 (60.4)	21.2 (70.2)
Mean daily minimum °C (°F)	10.0 (50.0)	10.2 (50.4)	12.1 (53.8)	14.8 (58.6)	18.2 (64.8)	21.9 (71.4)	24.4 (75.9)	25.1 (77.2)	23.2 (73.8)	19.5 (67.1)	15.1 (59.2)	11.8 (53.2)	15.9 (60.6)
Mean minimum °C (°F)	5.4 (41.7)	6.1 (43.0)	7.6 (45.7)	9.5 (49.1)	13.7 (56.7)	18.4 (65.1)	21.7 (71.1)	22.7 (72.9)	19.5 (67.1)	14.8 (58.6)	9.9 (49.8)	7.3 (45.1)	5.4 (41.7)
Record low °C (°F)	−1.6 (29.1)	−3.5 (25.7)	2.0 (35.6)	4.3 (39.7)	9.6 (49.3)	13.0 (55.4)	17.0 (62.6)	17.9 (64.2)	14.2 (57.6)	8.5 (47.3)	5.0 (41.0)	0.2 (32.4)	−3.5 (25.7)
Average rainfall mm (inches)	124.9 (4.92)	95.2 (3.75)	52.8 (2.08)	23.6 (0.93)	2.7 (0.11)	0.1 (0.00)	0.0 (0.0)	0.0 (0.0)	1.2 (0.05)	28.0 (1.10)	77.8 (3.06)	135.5 (5.33)	541.8 (21.33)
Average rainy days (≥ 0.1 mm)	13.9	11.7	8.6	3.6	1.4	0.1	0.1	0	0.8	3.9	8.0	11.8	63.9
Source: Israel Meteorological Service

Climate data for Safed (Har Kenaan) (2004-2022, extremes 1939–present)
Month	Jan	Feb	Mar	Apr	May	Jun	Jul	Aug	Sep	Oct	Nov	Dec	Year
Record high °C (°F)	21.7 (71.1)	26.7 (80.1)	30.9 (87.6)	34.5 (94.1)	38.1 (100.6)	40.0 (104.0)	39.0 (102.2)	42.0 (107.6)	40.6 (105.1)	36.0 (96.8)	30.1 (86.2)	24.4 (75.9)	42.0 (107.6)
Mean daily maximum °C (°F)	10.3 (50.5)	12.2 (54.0)	15.6 (60.1)	20.5 (68.9)	25.3 (77.5)	28.6 (83.5)	30.6 (87.1)	30.4 (86.7)	28.5 (83.3)	24.8 (76.6)	18.1 (64.6)	12.6 (54.7)	21.4 (70.5)
Daily mean °C (°F)	7.6 (45.7)	9.1 (48.4)	11.7 (53.1)	15.9 (60.6)	20.1 (68.2)	23.1 (73.6)	25.2 (77.4)	25.2 (77.4)	23.4 (74.1)	20.4 (68.7)	14.8 (58.6)	10.0 (50.0)	17.2 (63.0)
Mean daily minimum °C (°F)	5.0 (41.0)	6.0 (42.8)	7.9 (46.2)	11.3 (52.3)	14.9 (58.8)	17.6 (63.7)	19.9 (67.8)	20.0 (68.0)	18.4 (65.1)	15.9 (60.6)	11.4 (52.5)	7.3 (45.1)	13.0 (55.3)
Record low °C (°F)	−6.4 (20.5)	−9.0 (15.8)	−3.4 (25.9)	0.2 (32.4)	5.7 (42.3)	8.7 (47.7)	12.2 (54.0)	13.0 (55.4)	10.7 (51.3)	5.9 (42.6)	−1.7 (28.9)	−3.2 (26.2)	−9.0 (15.8)
Average rainfall mm (inches)	182.1 (7.17)	122.9 (4.84)	61.4 (2.42)	34.8 (1.37)	12.3 (0.48)	0.1 (0.00)	0.0 (0.0)	0.8 (0.03)	3.3 (0.13)	21.3 (0.84)	72.3 (2.85)	143.4 (5.65)	654.7 (25.78)
Average rainy days (≥ 0.1 mm)	14.3	11.3	9.7	5.0	2.9	0.2	0.0	0.1	1.1	4.3	7.8	11.3	67.9
Source: Israel Meteorological Service

Climate data for Beersheba (1991-2020)
Month	Jan	Feb	Mar	Apr	May	Jun	Jul	Aug	Sep	Oct	Nov	Dec	Year
Record high °C (°F)	31.5 (88.7)	35.2 (95.4)	38.4 (101.1)	43.8 (110.8)	44.8 (112.6)	46.0 (114.8)	42.4 (108.3)	43.8 (110.8)	44.0 (111.2)	41.7 (107.1)	38.3 (100.9)	32.5 (90.5)	46.0 (114.8)
Mean daily maximum °C (°F)	17.2 (63.0)	18.6 (65.5)	22.1 (71.8)	26.7 (80.1)	30.6 (87.1)	33.1 (91.6)	34.5 (94.1)	34.6 (94.3)	32.9 (91.2)	30.0 (86.0)	24.6 (76.3)	19.5 (67.1)	27.0 (80.6)
Daily mean °C (°F)	12.0 (53.6)	13.1 (55.6)	16.0 (60.8)	19.7 (67.5)	23.3 (73.9)	26.1 (79.0)	27.9 (82.2)	28.1 (82.6)	26.3 (79.3)	23.4 (74.1)	18.4 (65.1)	13.9 (57.0)	20.7 (69.3)
Mean daily minimum °C (°F)	6.8 (44.2)	7.7 (45.9)	9.8 (49.6)	12.7 (54.9)	16.0 (60.8)	19.0 (66.2)	21.2 (70.2)	21.5 (70.7)	19.5 (67.1)	16.7 (62.1)	12.1 (53.8)	8.3 (46.9)	14.3 (57.7)
Record low °C (°F)	−1.3 (29.7)	0.4 (32.7)	1.4 (34.5)	4.0 (39.2)	7.7 (45.9)	12.6 (54.7)	15.4 (59.7)	15.6 (60.1)	11.1 (52.0)	9.0 (48.2)	3.1 (37.6)	0.2 (32.4)	−1.3 (29.7)
Average precipitation mm (inches)	54.5 (2.15)	39.5 (1.56)	26.3 (1.04)	6.1 (0.24)	3.6 (0.14)	0.1 (0.00)	0.0 (0.0)	0.0 (0.0)	0.2 (0.01)	8.2 (0.32)	17.9 (0.70)	36.4 (1.43)	192.8 (7.59)
Average precipitation days (≥ 1.0 mm)	6.3	5.6	3.7	1.1	0.5	0.0	0.0	0.0	0.1	1.3	2.9	4.8	26.3
Mean monthly sunshine hours	193.4	176.4	219.0	284.9	329.9	365.2	373.7	350.4	305.3	279.6	211.3	185.7	3,274.8
Source 1: NOAA, DWD (sun 2015-2023)
Source 2: Israel Meteorological Service (records)

Climate data for Eilat (Temperature: 1987–2010, Precipitation: 1980–2010, extremes 1987–present))
Month	Jan	Feb	Mar	Apr	May	Jun	Jul	Aug	Sep	Oct	Nov	Dec	Year
Record high °C (°F)	32.2 (90.0)	35.8 (96.4)	38.7 (101.7)	43.4 (110.1)	45.2 (113.4)	47.4 (117.3)	48.3 (118.9)	48.8 (119.8)	48.9 (120.0)	44.3 (111.7)	38.1 (100.6)	33.6 (92.5)	48.9 (120.0)
Mean maximum °C (°F)	26.3 (79.3)	29.3 (84.7)	32.8 (91.0)	38.2 (100.8)	42.1 (107.8)	43.6 (110.5)	44.1 (111.4)	43.2 (109.8)	41.9 (107.4)	39.7 (103.5)	33.4 (92.1)	28.0 (82.4)	44.1 (111.4)
Mean daily maximum °C (°F)	21.3 (70.3)	23.0 (73.4)	26.1 (79.0)	31.0 (87.8)	35.7 (96.3)	38.9 (102.0)	40.4 (104.7)	40.0 (104.0)	37.3 (99.1)	33.1 (91.6)	27.7 (81.9)	23.0 (73.4)	31.5 (88.6)
Daily mean °C (°F)	15.8 (60.4)	17.4 (63.3)	20.5 (68.9)	24.7 (76.5)	29.1 (84.4)	32.0 (89.6)	33.8 (92.8)	33.7 (92.7)	31.3 (88.3)	27.4 (81.3)	22.0 (71.6)	17.1 (62.8)	25.4 (77.7)
Mean daily minimum °C (°F)	10.4 (50.7)	11.8 (53.2)	14.6 (58.3)	18.4 (65.1)	22.5 (72.5)	25.2 (77.4)	27.3 (81.1)	27.4 (81.3)	25.2 (77.4)	21.8 (71.2)	16.3 (61.3)	11.9 (53.4)	19.4 (66.9)
Mean minimum °C (°F)	5.9 (42.6)	7.4 (45.3)	10.1 (50.2)	13.4 (56.1)	17.7 (63.9)	21.5 (70.7)	24.8 (76.6)	24.8 (76.6)	22.0 (71.6)	17.4 (63.3)	11.5 (52.7)	7.5 (45.5)	5.9 (42.6)
Record low °C (°F)	1.2 (34.2)	0.9 (33.6)	3.0 (37.4)	8.4 (47.1)	12.1 (53.8)	18.5 (65.3)	20.0 (68.0)	19.4 (66.9)	18.6 (65.5)	9.2 (48.6)	5.3 (41.5)	2.5 (36.5)	0.9 (33.6)
Average rainfall mm (inches)	4 (0.2)	3 (0.1)	3 (0.1)	2 (0.1)	1 (0.0)	0 (0)	0 (0)	0 (0)	0 (0)	4 (0.2)	2 (0.1)	5 (0.2)	24 (1)
Average rainy days (≥ 0.1 mm)	2.1	1.8	1.6	0.9	0.7	0	0	0	0	0.7	0.8	1.9	10.5
Average relative humidity (%)	32	28	25	19	16	15	17	18	23	27	29	33	24
Mean monthly sunshine hours	229.4	237.3	251.1	273	319.3	324	347.2	347.2	291	282.1	246	217	3,364.6
Source: Israel Meteorological Service

== Natural resources ==
Unlike much of the Middle East which is rich in lucrative crude oil, Israel has limited natural resources. These include copper, phosphates, bromide, potash, clay, sand, sulfur, asphalt, and manganese. Small amounts of crude oil are present, often too little to merit commercial extraction.

=== Minerals ===
Israel is a major exporter of fertilizers and minerals. Bromine is a major export, accounting for 48% of world production. It also produces magnesium and potash.

=== Natural gas ===
In 2009, significant reserves of natural gas were discovered at the Tamar 1 offshore drilling site, 90 kilometers west of Haifa. It is the largest natural gas reserve ever discovered in Israel. Since then, Israel has become a natural gas exporter, going as far as to reverse the flow of the Arish–Ashkelon pipeline and begin exporting gas to Egypt.

=== Solar energy ===
Owing to its location near the equator, Israel receives a large amount of solar energy. As of 2024, it was generating 10.79 teraWatt hours of solar electricity, making 13.2% of its total energy mix. The Israeli government made it an objective to reach 30% renewable power generation by 2030.

== Environmental concerns ==
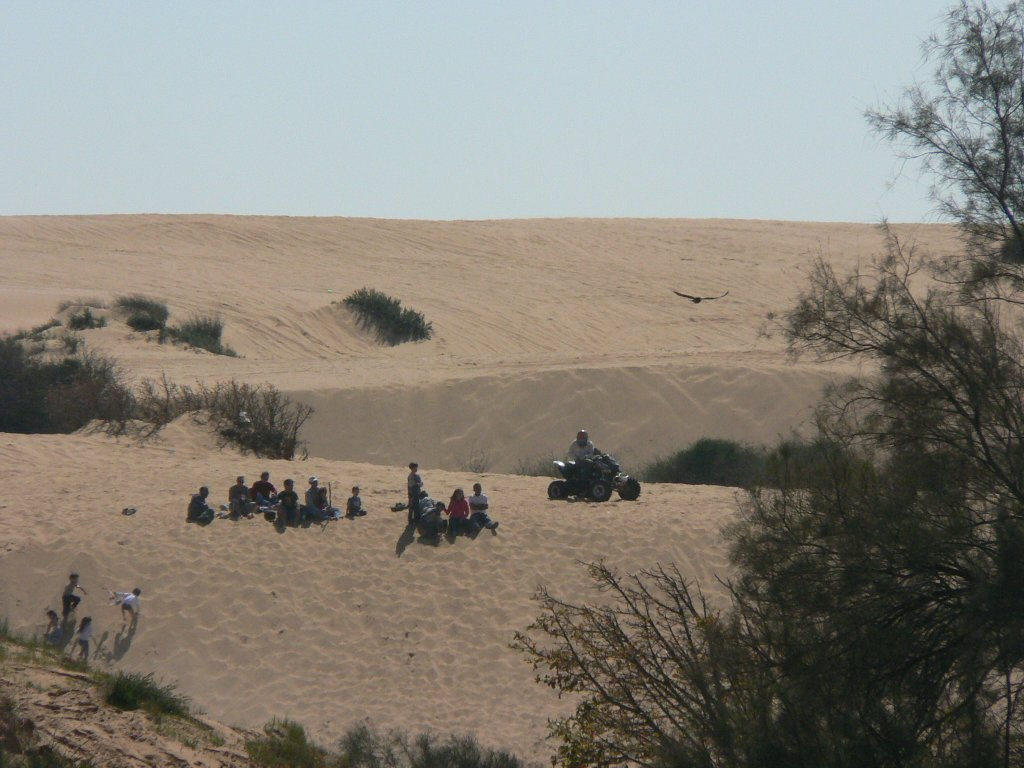
Ashdod dunes

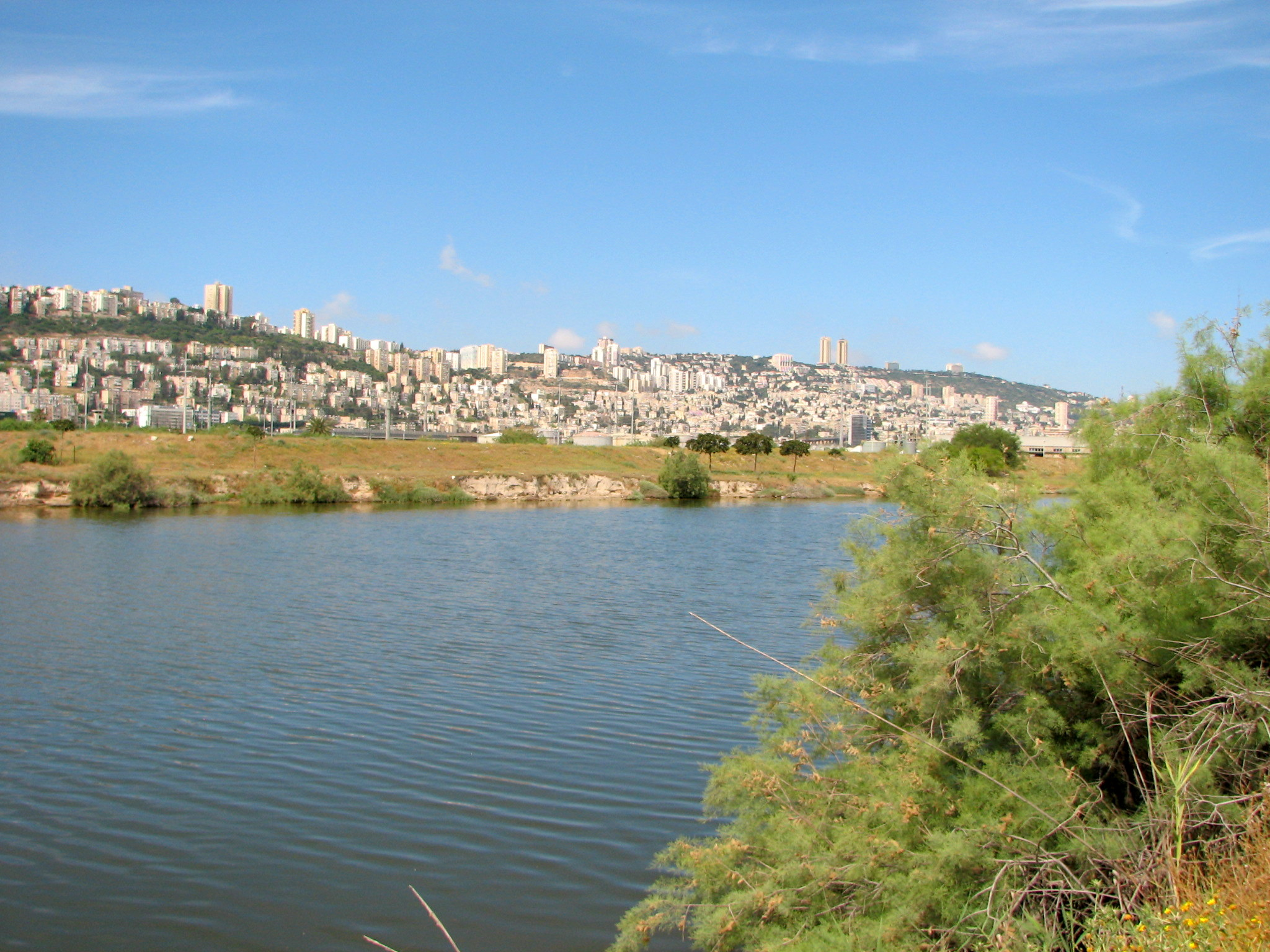
Formerly polluted Kishon River after clean-up, 2010

Israel has a large number of environmental concerns ranging from natural hazards to man-made issues both resulting from ancient times to modern development. Natural hazards facing the country include sandstorms which sometimes occur during spring in the desert south, droughts which are usually concentrated in summer months, flash floods which create great danger in the deserts due to their lack of notice, and regular earthquakes, most of which are small, although there is a constant risk due to Israel's location along the Jordan Rift Valley. Current environmental concerns include the lack of arable land and natural fresh water resources. Whilst measures have been taken to irrigate and grow in the desert, the amount of water needed here poses issues. Desertification is also a risk possible on the desert fringe, whilst air pollution from industrial and vehicle emissions and groundwater pollution from industrial and domestic waste are also issues facing the country. Furthermore, the effects of the use of chemical fertilizers, and pesticides are issues facing the country. Israel has signed many international environmental agreements and is party to:

- Convention on Biological Diversity
- UNFCCC – Climate Change
- United Nations Convention to Combat Desertification
- Convention on the International Trade in Endangered Species of Wild Flora and Fauna
- Hazardous Wastes
- Nuclear Test Ban
- Montreal Protocol – Ozone Layer Protection
- MARPOL 73/78 – Ship Pollution
- Convention on Wetlands of International Importance Especially As Waterfowl Habitat

Signed but not ratified:

- Kyoto Protocol
- Marine Life Conservation

== Rural settlements ==
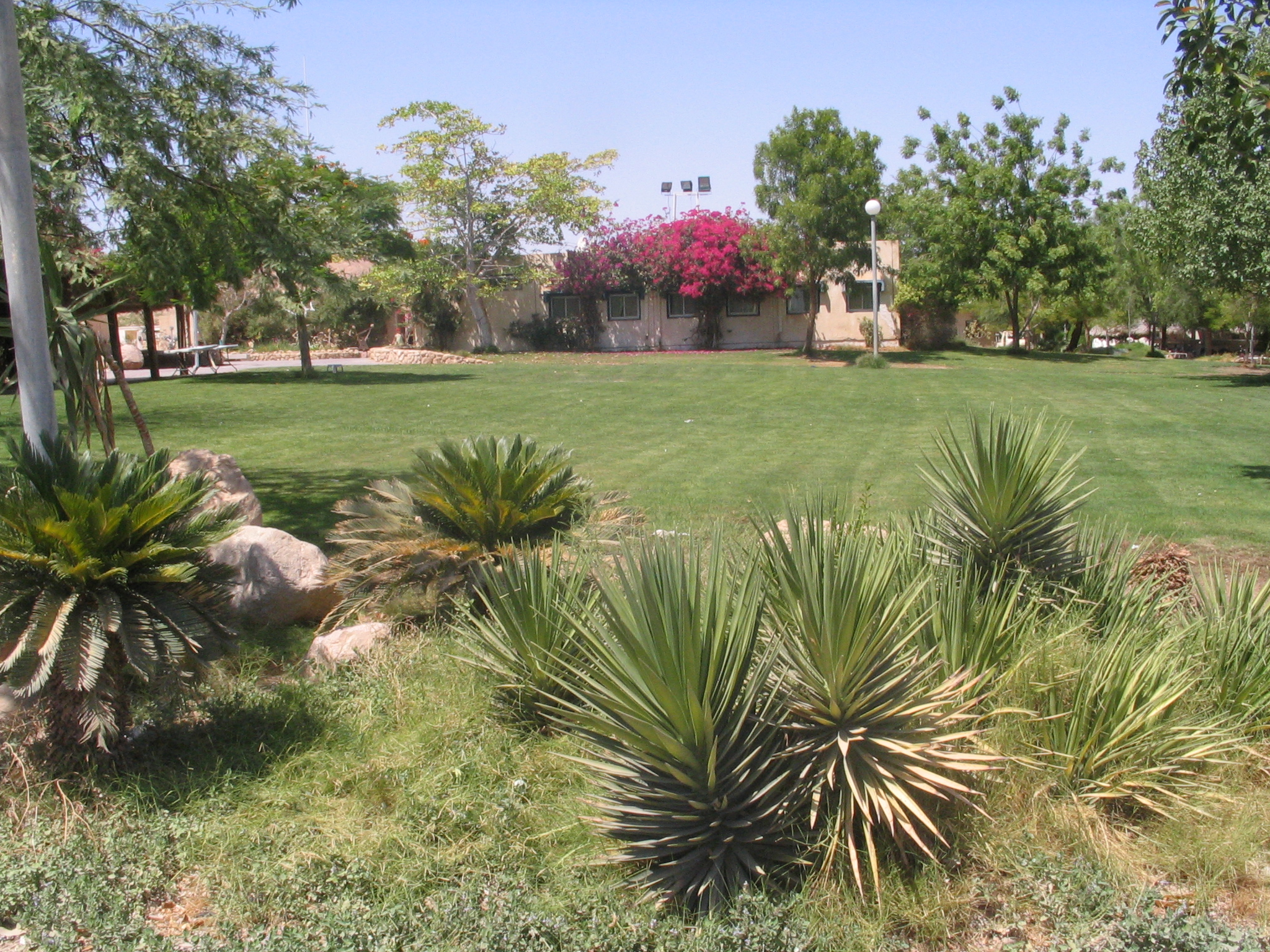
View of Kibbutz Lotan

Israel's rural space includes several unique kinds of settlements, notably the moshav and the kibbutz. Originally these were collective and cooperative settlements respectively. Over time, the degree of cooperation in these settlements has decreased and in several of them the cooperative structure has been dismantled altogether. All rural settlements and many small towns (some of which are dubbed "rurban settlements") are incorporated in regional councils. Land use in Israel is 17% arable land, 4% permanent crops, and 79% other uses. As of 2003 1,940 square kilometers (749 sq mi) were irrigated.

There are 242 Israeli settlements and civilian land use sites in the West Bank, 42 in the Golan Heights, and 29 in East Jerusalem.

== Islands ==
Israel has the Rosh Hanikra Islands and the Achziv Islands within its territorial waters. The Israeli government plans to build artificial islands off the coast to house an airport, a seaport, a desalination plant, a power plant, and a military testing base, as an answer to Israel's lack of space.

== Human geography ==
Largest cities in Israel Israel Central Bureau of Statistics
Rank	Name	District	Pop.	Rank	Name	District	Pop.
1	Jerusalem	Jerusalem	1,050,153^{a}	11	Beit Shemesh	Jerusalem	176,786
2	Tel Aviv	Tel Aviv	494,900	12	Ramat Gan	Tel Aviv	172,242
3	Haifa	Haifa	297,082	13	Ashkelon	Southern	166,864
4	Petah Tikva	Central	270,403	14	Rehovot	Central	155,049
5	Rishon LeZion	Central	259,275	15	Bat Yam	Tel Aviv	129,494
6	Netanya	Central	234,813	16	Herzliya	Tel Aviv	110,884
7	Bnei Brak	Tel Aviv	229,996	17	Hadera	Haifa	107,974
8	Ashdod	Southern	228,562	18	Modi'in	Central	100,052
9	Beersheba	Southern	223,587	19	Kfar Saba	Central	99,410
10	Holon	Tel Aviv	191,829	20	Lod	Central	94,189

^a This number includes East Jerusalem and West Bank areas, which had a total population of 617,580 inhabitants in 2023. Israeli sovereignty over East Jerusalem is internationally unrecognized.

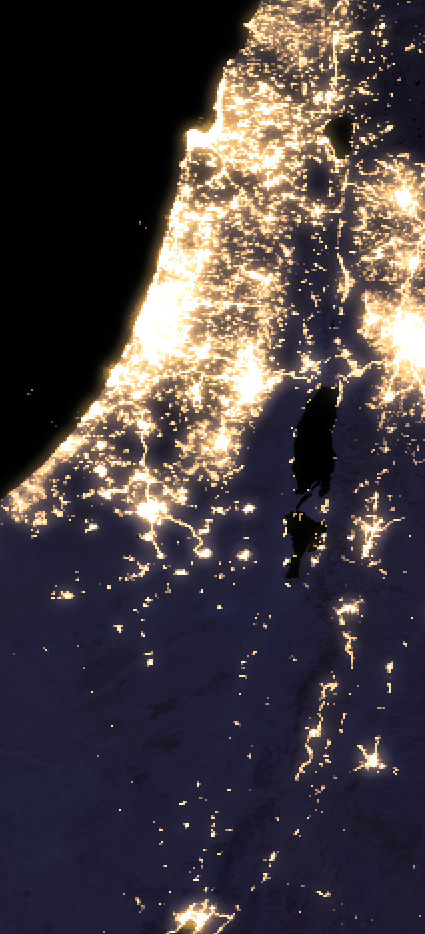
Satellite image of Israel at night

As of 2013, the population of Israel is 8 million, 6,015,000 of them Jewish.

For statistical purposes, the country has three metropolitan areas; Gush Dan-Tel Aviv (population 3,150,000), Haifa (population 996,000), and Beersheba (population 531,600). Some argue that Jerusalem, Israel's largest city with a population of 763,600, and Nazareth, should also be classified as metropolitan areas. In total, Israel has 74 cities, 14 of which have populations of over 100,000. Other forms of local government in Israel are local councils of which there are 144 governing small municipalities generally over 2,000 in population, and regional councils of which there are 53, governing a group of small communities over a relatively large geographical area.

Israel's population is diverse demographically; 76% Jewish, 20% Arab, and 4% unaffiliated. In terms of religion, 76% are Jewish, 16% Muslim, 2% Christian, 2% Druze, and 4% are unclassified by choice. 8% of Israeli Jews are haredi; 9% are "religious", 12% "religious-traditionalists", 27% are "non-religious traditionalists", and 43% are "secular". Other small, but notable groups in Israel, include Circassians of whom there are approximately 3,000 living mostly in two northern villages, 2,500 Lebanese, and 5,000 Armenians predominantly in Jerusalem.

== Overshoot index ==
Israel is ranked 34th in the world in terms of population density with, as noted, a climate of long, hot, rainless summers and relatively short, cool, rainy winters. The Population Matters 2011 overshoot index ranked Israel as the third most dependent region in the World after Singapore and Kuwait.

== See also ==
- Archaeology of Israel
- Kurkar
- Land of Israel
- List of endemic flora of Israel
- Historical maps of Israel
- National parks and nature reserves of Israel
- Outline of Israel
- Tourism in Israel
- Wildlife of Israel
