= Tropical Asia =

Region of Asia

Tropical Asia refers to the entirety of the areas in Asia with a tropical climate. These areas are of geographic and economic importance due to their natural resources and biodiversity, which include many species of agricultural value. There are 16 countries in tropical Asia, ranging in size from around 610 square kilometres (240 square miles) (Singapore) to 3,000,000 km^{2} (1,200,000 sq mi) (India). The total population as of 2006 was 1.6 billion, predominantly rural, and projected to reach 2.4 billion by 2025. Climate in tropical Asia is subject to seasonal weather patterns with the two monsoons and the amount of tropical cyclones in the three core areas of cyclogenesis (the Bay of Bengal, north Pacific Ocean and South China Sea). Stressors on the environment include growing urbanization, land industrialization, economic development, land degradation, environmental issues, and increased pollution, all of which are contributing to changes in climate.

== Bionetwork ==
In tropical Asia, the distribution and character of the rain forest changes with elevation in the mountains. In Thailand, for instance, the area of tropical forests could increase from 45% to 80% of the total forest cover, while in Sri Lanka, a substantial change in dry forest and decrease in wet forest might occur. With predictable increases in evapotranspiration and rainfall changeability, likely a negative impact on the viability of freshwater wetlands will occur, resulting in contraction and desiccation. Sea level and temperature rises are the most likely major climate change-related stresses on ecosystems. Coral reefs might be capable of surviving this intensification, but suffer bleaching from high temperatures. Landward migration of mangroves and tidal wetlands is likely to be inhibited by human infrastructure and human activities.

== Coastal lands ==
Coastal lands in particular are extremely vulnerable to sea-level rise as a result of climate change. Densely settled and intensively used low-level coastal plains, deltas, and islands are particularly susceptible to coastal erosion and land loss, sea flooding and barrage, especially vulnerable to coastal erosion and land loss, inundation and sea flooding, upstream movement of the saline/freshwater front and seawater incursion into freshwater lenses. Mainly at risk are large delta regions of Bangladesh, Myanmar, Vietnam and Thailand, and the low-lying areas of Indonesia, Malaysia and the Philippines. Socio-economic effects may be noticeable to major cities and ports, tourist resorts, artisanal and commercial fishing and coastal agriculture, and infra-structure development. Global studies project that by 2100, up to 410 million people (59 per cent in tropical Asia) may be affected by a 1-metre rise in sea level.

== Hydrology ==
In tropical Asia, the Himalayas are crucial to the provision of water during the continental monsoon season in Asia. Augmented temperatures and seasonal variability could cause a backdrop of glaciers and increasing danger from glacial lake outburst floods. Then, a diminution of average flow of snow-fed rivers, mixed with an increase in peak flows and sediment yield, could have major effects on hydropower generation, urban water supply and agriculture. Supply of hydropower generation from snow-fed rivers can occur in the short term, though not in the long term—run off snow-fed rivers might change as well. As stated before, an increased amount economic, agriculture, and industrial resources, can affect climate, but it can put an extra stress on water. Lower level basins are expected to be most affected. Hydrological changes on island and drainage basins will be relatively low to tropical Asia, despite those related to sea rise.

== Food ration ==
The sensitivity of major cereal and tree crops, changes in temperature, moisture and CO_{2} concentration of the magnitudes estimated for the region has been done in many studies. One instance is the influences on rice fields, wheat yield and sorghum yield imply that any increase in production associated with CO_{2} fertilization will most likely be offset by reductions in yield from temperature or moisture changes. Even though climate impression may result huge changes in crop yields, storage, and distribution., the continuing effect of the region-wide changes is tentative because of varietal disparity; local disparity in emergent season, crop management, etc. (the lack of inclusion of possible diseases, pests, and microorganisms in crop model simulations); and the vulnerability of agricultural (especially low-income rural population) areas to periodic environmental hazards such as floods, droughts and cyclones.

== Human health ==
The occurrence and level of some vector-borne diseases have risen with global warming. Diseases such as malaria, schistosomiasis and dengue, which are significant causes of mortality and morbidity in tropical Asia, are very climate-sensitive and likely to spread into new regions on the margins of currently widespread areas as a result of climate change. Populations that are newly affected will initially experience higher fatality rates. According to one study specifically focused on climate influences on infectious disease in presently vulnerable regions, a growth in epidemic potential of 12-27 per cent for malaria and 31 to 47 per cent for dengue and a decrease of schistosomiasis of 11-17 per cent are expected under a range of Global Climate Model (GCM) scenarios through climate change. Waterborne and water-related infectious diseases, already accounting for the majority of epidemic emergencies in the area, are also expected to increase when higher temperatures and higher humidity are placed over on existing conditions and estimated upsurge in population, urbanization, deduction of water quality and other trends.

== Tropical rain forest resources ==
=== Edible plants ===
Tropical Asia has an abundance of edible resources. The following section involves various edible resource plants.

Bananas are the most famous members of Musa with 21 species and edible subspecies. Especially in the Mayan area, it is probably native to Southeast Asia and widely refined in the tropics. Black pepper is vine to the East Indies—made by drying the whole fruit (peppercorn); white pepper is made by first hulling the fruit, then grinding. The majority of production is in India and Indonesia; outside the region, America is a chief importer. Four of the main cultivators of this plant are capsicum annuum: cayenne pepper, sweet pepper, paprika, and jalapenos grown in temperate regions.

Native to India, cardamom is the most valuable spice. Cashews, originally from tropical America, are a rich nut full of vitamins. Further on, cocoa/chocolate as well as the soft drink cola, is native to lowland tropical America, but is confined through the west African tropics. Citrus fruits are of the most valued fruits in tropical Asia. More than 55 million tons are sold annually, including oranges, lemons, limes, grapefruits, tangerines, and more. The largest citrus is the pummelo. The scented flower buds of cloves come from a tropical evergreen tree native to Zanzibar, Madagascar, and Indonesia. Coconuts are originally native to the Indo-Pacific area and are around every tropical area except rain forests. They can be used for oil, fruit, and fibers. Coffee, probably native to North East Africa, is grown throughout the tropics.

In addition, grown throughout the tropics is mango, native to India (valuable in many parts) and from Southeast Asia (includes root tubers used as spice and perfumes). Mung bean is also native to India, is a potentially prosperous food. Nutmeg comes from the trees of an island in Maluku. Mace is formed of nutmeg, and is used as spice. The peanut, native to South America, is commercially spread in tropical, subtropical, and temperate regions—it is used as a chief source of oils and protein. Another important tropical and subtropical plant is pineapple, likely domestic by the Guarani of Brazil and Paraguay during the Pre-Columbian Era. Continuing on, Sesame is an early African oil seed plant—grown primarily in Southeast Asia. Squash is native to many American tropics and is cultivated tropical and subtropical America and temperate zones. Native to Southeast Asia and cultivated in India, turmeric is dried, ground rhizomes, and produce the spice. Then of the legume family, tamarind, is thought to be originally from India. It is grown throughout the tropics and used as a table fruit, drink, preserves, and medicinal properties. Vanilla is indigenous to tropical America, it is most commercially important of all the 35,000 species of orchid. It is made from the dried seeds of the rainforest orchid tree. It is widely grown, especially in Madagascar.

== Wildlife ==
Many native animals have developed adaptations that help them aerially navigate through their tropical habitats. Some vertebrates have developed the ability to glide through the air. Some fish jump out of the water to escape predators, expand their large pectoral fins and glide nearly hundreds of yards. As well, many frogs have long-webbed, elongate fingers and toes that function like parachutes when they leap from the leaves and branches of trees to glide across the forest.

Several groups of mammals, for example colugos, and rodents have developed many different ways to move through the air. In Southeast Asia, the ability to glide in modern, non-avian reptiles has arisen at least three, maybe four times for lizards, and once in snakes.

In Southeast Asia, the gliding lizards within Agamidae are arboreal, diurnal, and prominent predators who signal another by puffing out their throats and expanding their chests to show their radiant colour patterns. Also, they can jump from branch to branch for prey or to escape predation. When threatened, Green Crested Lizards leap from one tree to next, splay out their limbs, and expand their rib cages during flight.

Open surfaces are often the place where Draco, (black bearded) gliding lizards communicate with each other. When not flying, their heads are usually seen sitting head up on the trunks of the trees; their wings creatively folded to their bodies. Most of their day is spent feeding on ants up and down trees, making for the majority of their diet. Once in a while, they will want to change outings and leap from the tree, extend their ribs to open their wings, and glide to the next tree. The degree and speed of the glide depends on a couple of aspects: the height of the lizard on the tree and the surface area of the wing comparative to the weight of the body.

The orange-haired gliding lizard has a thick neck and heavy body; it has small wings however, but despite its pace, it moves relatively fast. To pick up enough speed, it commonly needs to fold down its wing for a period of time. Therefore, they are seen on the tallest trees where they can safely dive to gain momentum to glide. Their flight structure helps separate them ecologically, keeping them from direct opposition with one another for some of the rainforest's resources. In some areas of the forest, up to eight different species of Draco may appear together. Generally, they are closely related species with unique, restrictive life histories living in the same area, the potential for opposition is likely.

Geckos are another notable gliding reptile. Their wings lack the elaborate thoracic (chest) mutation of gliding lizards and are composed mainly of a large flap of skin along their flanks. The flaps stay rolled across the belly until the lizard leaps off a tree the time they become inertly opened by air during the fall. Additionally, the body flaps are extended flaps along the sides of the head, neck, and tail; back sides of the hind limbs; and extensive webbing on the hands and feet. In flight, all of their wings are extended and splayed, creating the parachute effect. The Frilly Gecko, the smallest of them, travel from trees uniquely on the lowest part of the same tree to avoid predators. Geckos are cryptic species that are hidden during the day and active during the night, unlike the many arboreal agamids. In addition, their color patterns normally match the substrate where they stay allowing them to go ignored.

The flat-tailed gecko (Cosymbotus platyuurus), a species strongly related to the frilly gecko, is another example of intermediacy. It similarly folds skin along the head, body, limbs, and tail as the Frilly Gecko but not nearly as developed. It lays these flaps out on the trunk of the tree to prevent the curving of the body from a shadow where it meets the trunk, to give away its location. These flaps inertly open up like other geckos do when the gecko jumps from one branch to another and this imparts even a small advantage by extending the length of the jump.

Because of their lack of limbs, snakes are a group of vertebrates in which the ability to glide might be viewed as less likely to develop. However, in Peninsular Malaysia, there are three closely related species of snakes with ability to glide for significant distances. These are the tree snakes (genus Chrysopelea). The flat, open body works like a parasail and its rolling movements in flight, similar to a spinning frisbee, prevents it from overturning. Before leaping, tree snakes hang the uncoiled forepart of their body off the branch in a shape similar to that of the letter 'J'. Next, by shaking the body upward in tandem reaching outward by rapidly smoothing its coils and releasing, they will hold on the branch, the snakes take flight. They also enlarge their rib cage as a defense device to expose brightly colored markings on their scales.

== See also ==
- Climate of Asia
- Indomalayan realm
- Tropical monsoon climate
- Tropical rainforest climate
