= 2013 Middle East cold snap =

Weather event in the Middle East

- Animated of H500 during December 6–14, 2013 in the Middle East.

Meteorological history
- Formed: December 11, 2013
- Dissipated: December 15, 2013

Winter Storm

Overall effects
- Fatalities: 8
- Areas affected: Israel, Palestine, Jordan, Syria, Lebanon, Iraq, Egypt, Cyprus, Turkey, Saudi Arabia

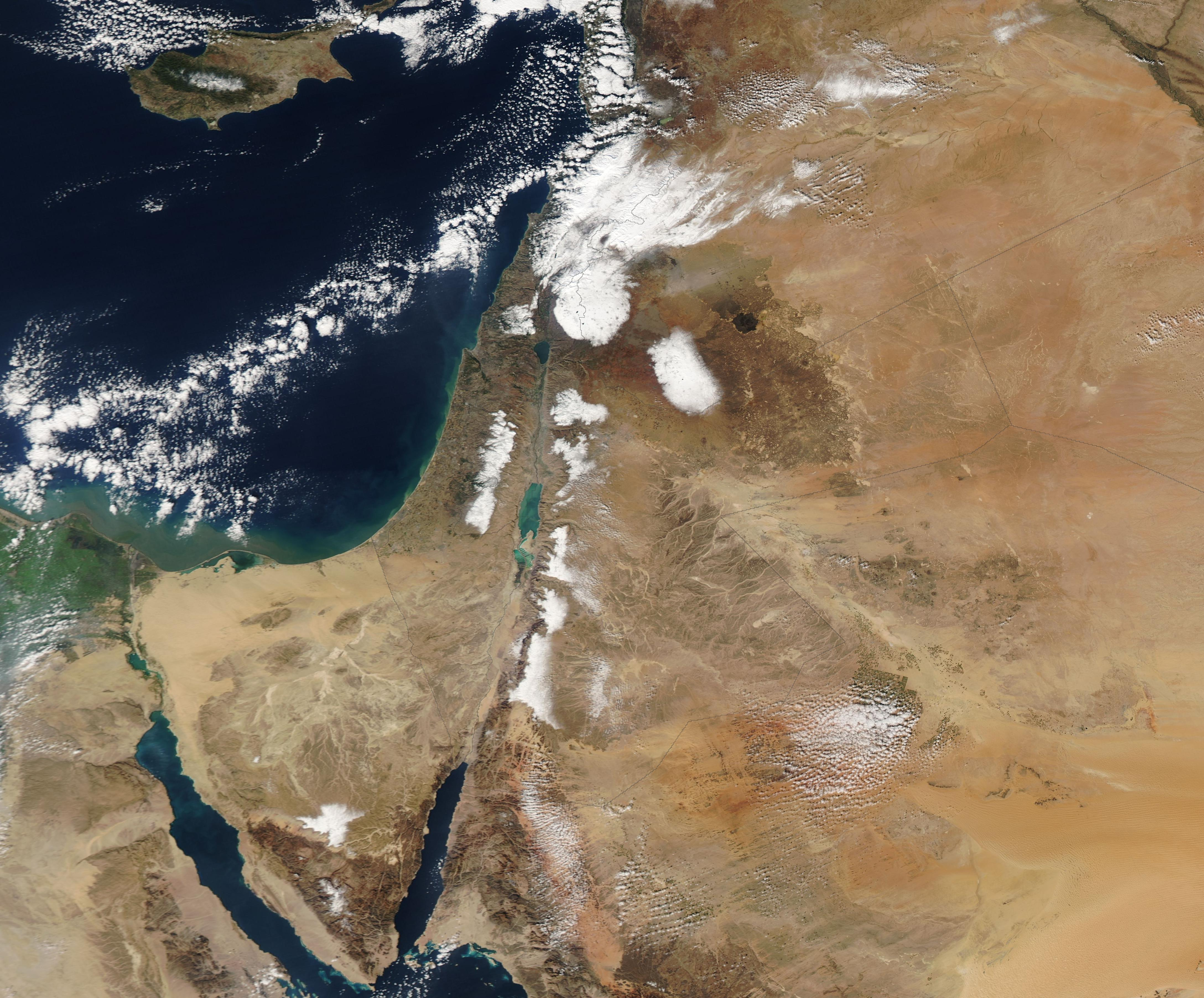
The Moderate Resolution Imaging Spectroradiometer (MODIS) on NASA's Terra satellite acquired this image of the snow on December 15 after the clouds cleared. For the most part, the snow is confined to higher elevations in Syria, Egypt, Lebanon, Israel, Palestine, and Jordan. Some lower-elevation desert regions in Syria are also snowy.

The 2013 Middle East cold snap, also referred to as Alexa, refers to the winter storm that hit the Middle East in December 2013, affecting Syria, Jordan, Israel, Palestine, Lebanon, Turkey, and Egypt. The storm severely affected millions of poor and displaced people across the region, especially afflicting refugees from the Syrian civil war.

== Meteorological history ==
Beginning December 11, a large anticyclone moved northward in the jet stream over Europe; its east edge drew a strong current of cold air south from the Arctic. This polar outbreak overspread Turkey and the Eastern Mediterranean, pushing below moist air associated with a passing front, causing heavy snow and sleet over higher ground in Syria, Lebanon, Jordan, Israel, and Palestine. At lower elevations, heavy rain from the system caused flooding in some areas.

The west edge of the anticyclone also drew in a warm southwest wind from around the Azores to Britain.

== Events by country ==
=== Cyprus ===
By December 14, 2013, the storm had covered the island's Troodos mountain range with snow. Snowing had begun several days earlier, with snow reaching a peak thickness of 70 cm (28 inches) in Troodos. Four hundred customers lost electricity, and several villages, including Armenohori, Farmakas, Kampi, and Sinaoros, completely lost it for extended periods of time.

=== Egypt ===
Egypt's capital Cairo witnessed extremely rare snowfall (mostly graupel) on December 13, that the local media claimed to be the first in 112 years. Nighttime temperatures were expected to drop as low as 2 °C (36 °F). Snow also fell heavily on mountains in the Sinai Peninsula.

=== Israel ===
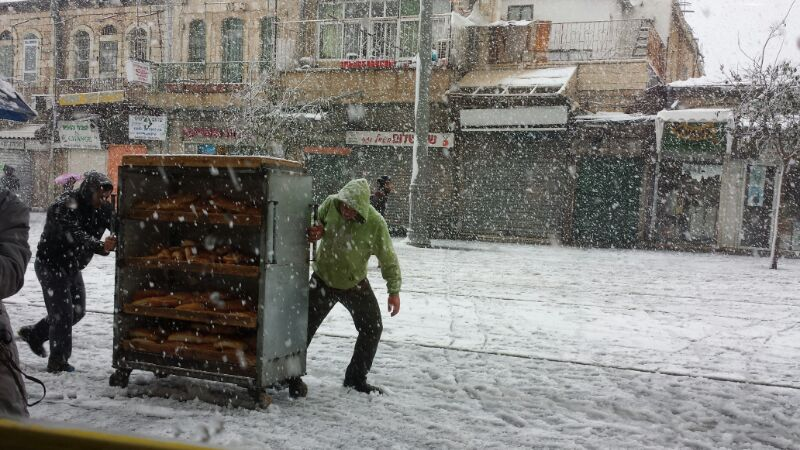
Two people pulling a cart of bread on Jaffa Street in Jerusalem, December 12, 2013.

On 13 December, 40–70 cm (16–28 in) of snow fell in Jerusalem and 1 m (3 ft 3 in) in the Kfar Etzion area. Warmer parts of Israel received heavy rains, causing floods. The railway into Jerusalem operated on the Sabbath for people stranded by blocked roads.

Roads were closed in Israel by deep snow and flooding. Storm clouds prompted Ben Gurion International Airport to shut down, forcing U.S. Secretary of State John Kerry to cut short his meeting with Palestinian President Mahmoud Abbas in Ramallah and return to the West Bank before roads and airports became unusable. Jerusalem was cut off for 48 hours by deep snow and flooding, with cars being abandoned after they were stuck in snow.

In the Israeli-occupied Golan Heights were covered with snow up to at least 100 cm (39 in) deep.

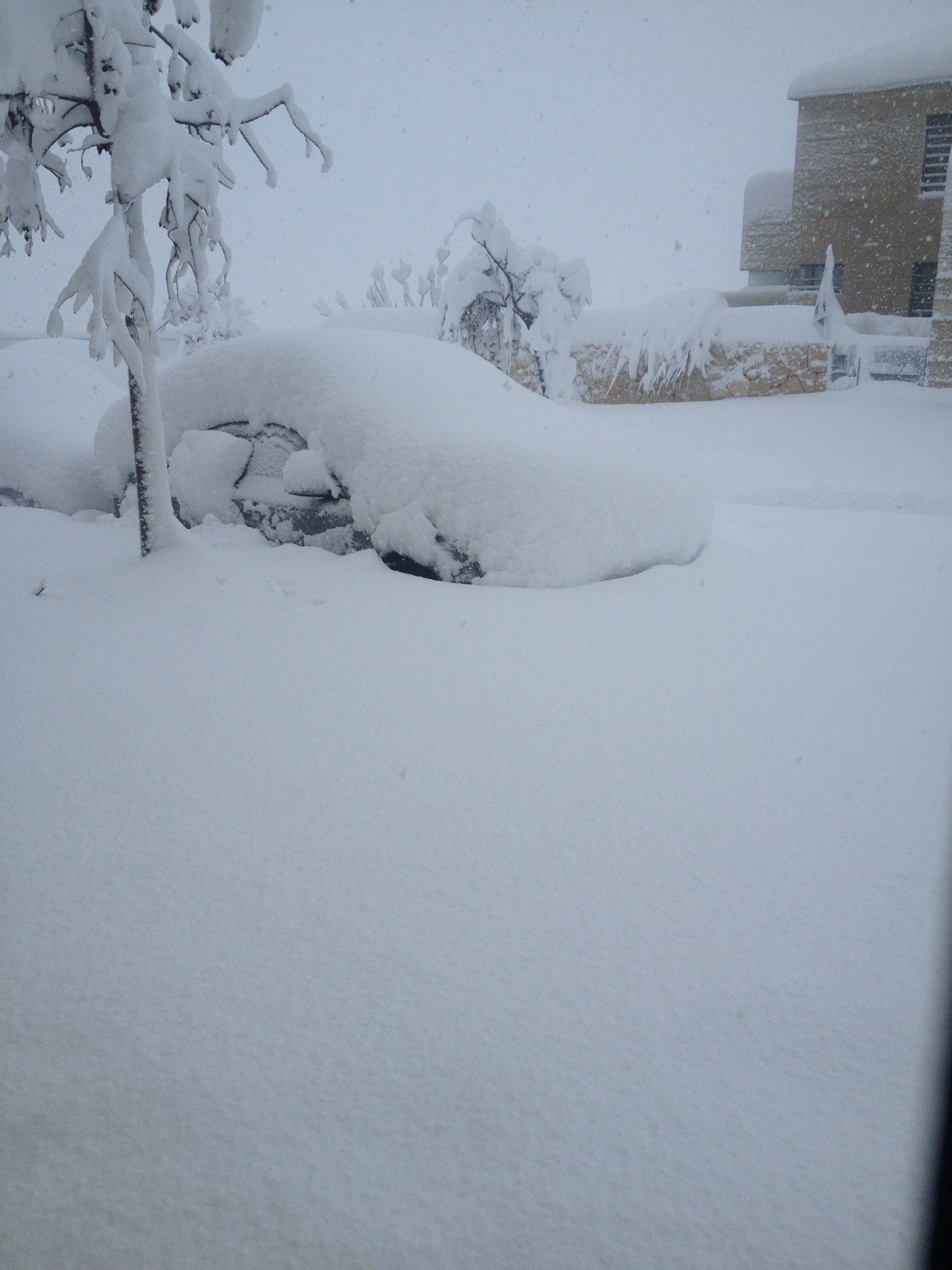
Snow-stranded automobiles in Har Adar, an Israeli settlement in the West Bank, December 2013.

=== Palestine, ===
On 13 December, 40–70 cm (16–28 in) of snow fell in Jerusalem. Warmer parts of Palestine received heavy rains, causing floods. Ramallah, Bethlehem, Jerusalem, Hebron, and many other towns and cities were coated in snow and some lower-lying areas suffered flooding from heavy rain.

Snow in Ramallah, Nablus, and Hebron ranged from 60–145 cm (24–57 in), and in Bethlehem ranged from 20–55 cm (7.9–21.7 in). The scene in Manger Square, the square adjacent to the Church of the Nativity was that of a white Christmas with the square fully decorated and covered with a deep coat of snow.

The Gaza Strip was lashed by torrential rain for a third day, with the local Hamas-run administration announcing that residents had been evacuated from 60 flooded homes since storms hit the coastal territory on December 11.

=== Jordan ===
In Jordan, Ghazi Sarhan, spokesman for Jordan's Administration of Syrian Refugee Camps, announced on December 13, that: "During the past 48 hours 10,000 blankets and 1,500 heaters have been distributed to refugees". Deep snow fell in Amman, where King Abdullah II helped to push a car that had got stuck in snow.

=== Lebanon ===
While snow is a common yearly occurrence in Lebanon, many Syrian refugees were severely affected by the unusually cold conditions. It was reported that the Lebanese Army was called in to help distribute emergency aid to refugees, and the United Nations (UN) handed out fuel, blankets, heaters and food rations amid a third day of severe winter weather in the region.

According to Abou Faour's announcement, published in Al Nahar newspaper on December 12:

"There are 1,600 refugee makeshift camps in addition to 431 random camps, which makes it difficult to reach these places. That is why the cabinet had to ask for the help of the army to make as much aid reach those refugees as possible."

=== Syria ===
The United Nations High Commission for Refugees (UNHCR) issued plans to airlift 40 tonnes (39 long tons; 44 short tons) of food for 50,000 to 60,000 people into the northeastern province of Hasakah from Iraq. The UN airlift of urgently needed food for tens of thousands of people in northeastern Syria, originally planned for December 12, was delayed by snow.

According to Matthew Hollingworth, Syria Country Director for the United Nations' World Food Programme (WFP):

"Most internally displaced Syrians fled their homes with few belongings so they do not even have enough warm clothes or blankets to fend off the freezing weather. They desperately need fuel for heating and to cook the food they receive as humanitarian assistance."

Reportedly, a child and a baby died from the cold on December 12, and an activist in a besieged rebel-held town of al-Harra said residents were struggling to stay warm with the electricity cut off and no food or fuel allowed in.
