= Dead Sea canal =

Dead Sea canal may refer to:

- Red Sea–Dead Sea Water Conveyance a planned conduit which would run from the Red Sea to the Dead Sea
- Mediterranean–Dead Sea Canal, a proposed project to dig a canal from the Mediterranean Sea to the Dead Sea
