= Israel Meteorological Service =

Israeli research institute

- השירות המטאורולוגי הישראלי
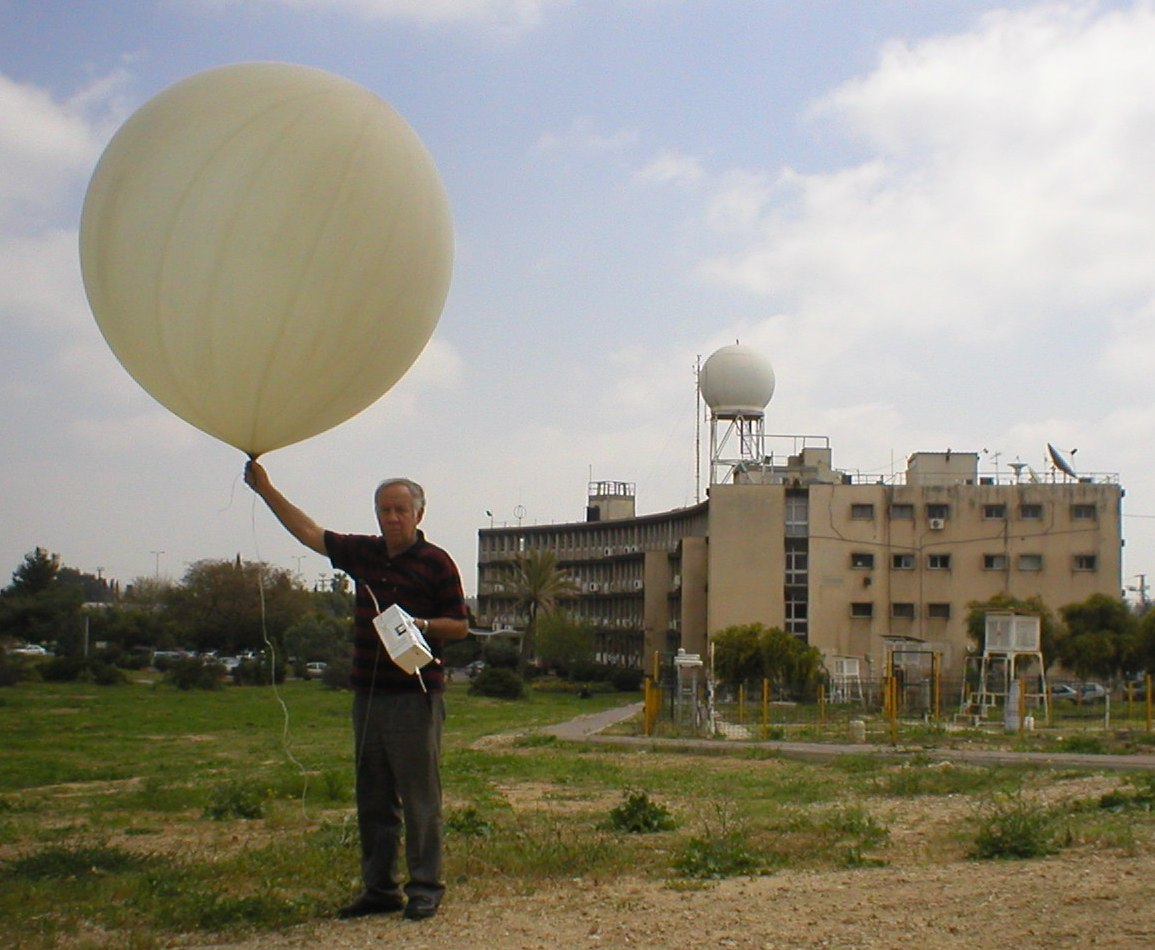

Agency overview
- Formed: 14 March 1937
- Headquarters: Beit Dagan, Israel
- Agency executive: Amir Givati
- Parent department: Ministry of Transport and Road Safety
- Website: https://ims.gov.il/en

The Israel Meteorological Service (Hebrew: השירות המטאורולוגי הישראלי, HaSherut HaMete'orologi HaYisra'eli) is a unit of the Israeli Ministry of Transportation responsible for forecasting weather, meteorological data and climate research in Israel.

It was founded in the 1930s as a meteorological unit during the British Mandate, mainly supporting the evolving aviation needs. After establishing the state of Israel, it was incorporated into the Ministry of Transportation. Since 1949, it has been a member of the World Meteorological Organization.

The Israeli Meteorological Service is headquartered near Beit Dagan and operates over 150 measuring stations nationwide.
