= 2026 Ra'am primary =

Israeli legislative primary election

On 22 August 2026, Ra'am held its first independent primary election in Tayibe ahead of the 2026 Israeli legislative election.

== Background ==
In January 2015 ahead of the 2015 election, Ra'am allied itself with other Arab parties to form the Joint List in an effort to reach the increased electoral threshold.

In December 2025, Ra'am distanced itself from its Islamist roots and announced its pending separation from the Islamic Movement and its Shura Council. The separation was completed in July 2026.

In January 2026 ahead of the 2026 election, Ra'am became open to Jewish candidates on its electoral list.

In early 2026, Ra'am signed an agreement with other Arab parties aimed at re-establishing the Joint List, but later announced that it would compete independently in the election. Hadash, Ta'al and Balad subsequently announced in late August that they would re-establish the Joint List without Ra'am.

== Process ==
Over 1,000 members of the party planned to meet in Tayibe to determine the first five slots on the party's list; the remainder will be determined by the executive committee.

== Candidates ==
Abbas and former Yesh Atid MK Yoav Segalovitz have been negotiating his entry into Ra’am, with second place reportedly under discussion. However, Abbas has explicitly indicated that the issue of bringing in outside candidates would be dealt with after the primary, rather than being decided by the internal vote.

== Reserved slots ==
The slot for the "northern district" was given to Abbas, while Waleed Taha was given the reserved slot for the center; Waleed Alhwashla represented the Southern slot and Yasir Hujeirat was given the national slot.

MK Iman Khatib-Yassin retained the woman's slot, defeating Shima Hindawi.

== Results ==
Party leader Mansour Abbas was elected to the first slot, followed by Waleed Taha, Waleed Alhwashla, Iman Khatib-Yassin in the reserved women's slot and Yasir Hujeirat in the fifth slot.
