= Lebanese people in Israel =

Minority group in Israel

Lebanese in Israel
Total population
- 3,500

Regions with significant populations
- Northern District (especially Nahariya, Kiryat Shmona, Tiberias, Ma'alot and Haifa)

Languages
- Lebanese Arabic, Hebrew, French

Religion
- Christians, Muslims, Druze

Related ethnic groups
- Lebanese people

Lebanese in Israel (Arabic: لبنانيون في إسرائيل; Hebrew: לבנונים בישראל) are Lebanese people living in Israel.

Most of them are former members of the South Lebanon Army (SLA) and their families. The SLA was a Christian-led militia allied with the Israel Defense Forces during the South Lebanon conflict until Israel's withdrawal from Lebanon in May 2000 that ended the Israeli occupation of Southern Lebanon.

The majority are Maronites but there are also Muslims, Druze and Christians of other denominations among them. Many of them do not consider themselves as Arabs, claiming to be Phoenicians. They are registered by the Ministry of Interior as "Lebanese" and hold Israeli citizenship.

The native language of former SLA members is Lebanese Arabic. However, the language is only partially transmitted from one generation to another. The majority of the second generation understand and speak Lebanese Arabic but are unable to read and write it. Young Lebanese Israeli mainly text in Hebrew or, more rarely, in Lebanese Arabic written in the Hebrew alphabet. Religious books for children and youths are similarly written in Classical Arabic (or in Lebanese Arabic for some songs) in Hebrew letters.

Their main church is in Acre, Israel and they tend to pray separately from other Maronites in Israel.

They are located across the country, mainly in the Northern District. Around 250 families live in Nahariya, 100 in Kiryat Shmona, and 80 in Tiberias.

== See also ==
- Israel–Lebanon relations
- Lebanese prisoners in Israel
- Maronites in Israel
- Jewish migration from Lebanon post-1948
- History of the Jews in Lebanon
