= Maronites in Israel =

Christian minority in Israel

الموارنة في إسرائيل

Total population
- 11,000

Regions with significant populations
- Jish, Haifa, Nazareth, Jerusalem

Languages
- Arabic, Hebrew, Neo-Aramaic (Language revitalization), Classical Syriac (Liturgical)

Religion
- Christianity (Maronite Church)

Related ethnic groups
- Arameans in Israel, Assyrians in Israel

Maronites in Israel (Arabic: الموارنة في إسرائيل; Hebrew: מארונים; Syriac: ܒܝܫܪܐܠ ܡܖ̈ܘܢܝܐ) are an ethnoreligious minority who belong to the Maronite Catholic Church, which has historically been tied with Lebanon. They derive their name from the Syriac Saint Maron, whose followers moved to Mount Lebanon from northern Syria, establishing the Maronite Church, most of whose members currently reside in Lebanon. The Maronites in Israel encompass the long-existing Maronite community in Jish, Haifa, and Nazareth areas, as well as the families of former South Lebanon Army members, 7,000 of whom fled South Lebanon in April–May 2000 to Israel. Of these approximately 7,000 original migrants, 2,700 remained in Israel which by 2025 has increased by natural growth (births minus deaths) with their Israeli-born members to 3,500. Of the original immigrants who left over the years, most moved to Europe or the United States and some decided to return to Lebanon.

Since 2014, Maronites in Israel are eligible to register their ethnicity as "Aramean".

== History ==
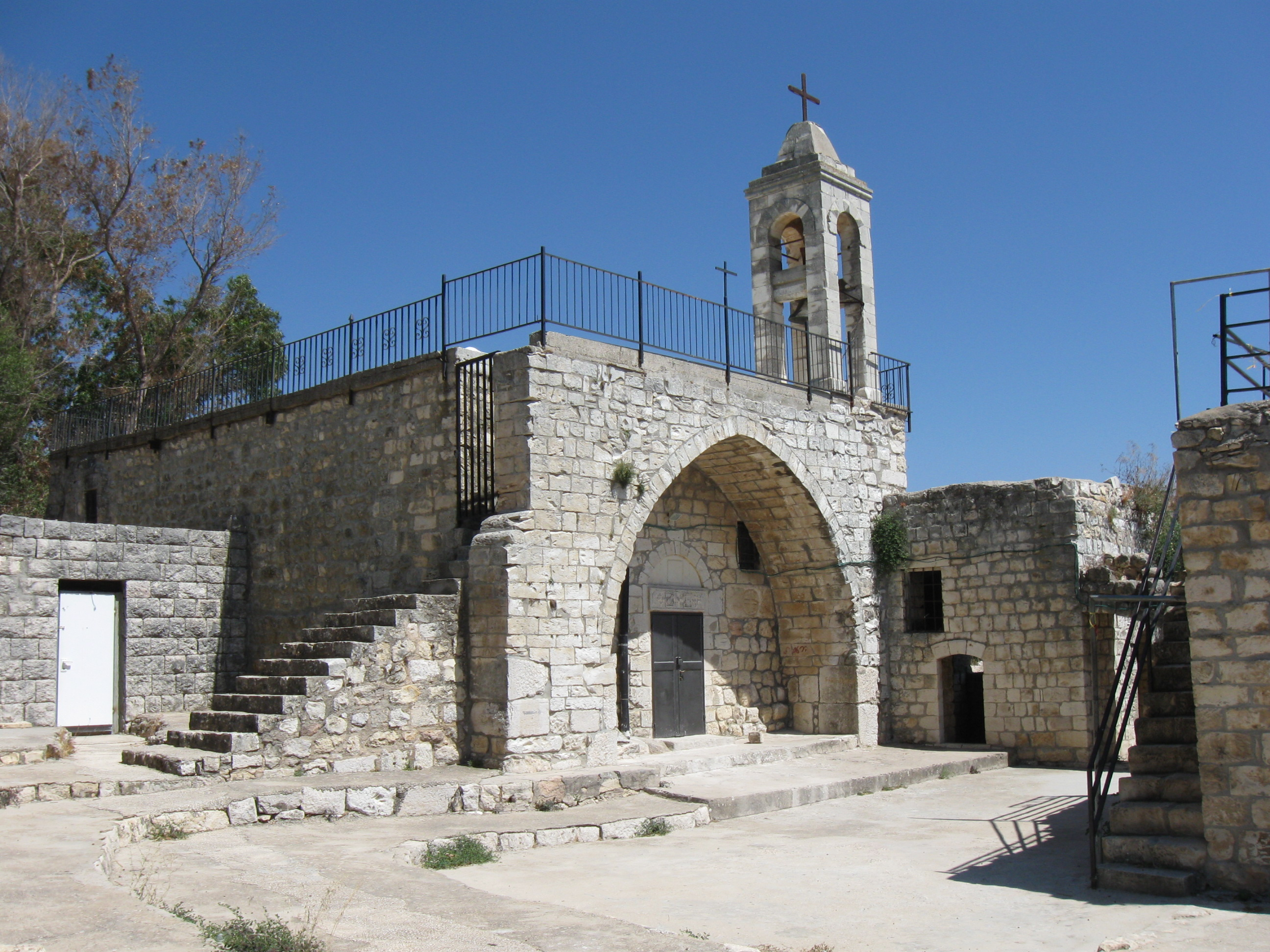
The church of Kafr Bir'im

The Maronite community in upper Galilee spans from the 18th century, being concentrated in the village of Kafr Bir'im and Jish. Following the 1948 Arab-Israeli War, the residents of the Maronite village of Kafr Bir'im were ordered by the IDF to evacuate temporarily, due to its strategic proximity to the Lebanese border. However, the Maronite residents were prohibited from returning to their hometown Kafr Bir'im after the war (a fact that still stands today), and thus ended up taking residence in neighboring villages, predominantly, in Jish and Rameh, both of which had been almost emptied of their Arab Muslim population, who fled during the war. The Maronites constitute 55% of Jish's population, next to Melkites (10%) and Sunni Muslims (35%).

The Maronite population of Israel has significantly increased, as a direct result of the May 2000 withdrawal of IDF from southern Lebanon. Several thousands of former SLA militia members and their families, mostly Lebanese Maronites, fled from South Lebanon to Galilee during April–May 2000. While many of them later immigrated to France, Canada, United States and South America, the rest have remained in Israel. The cities and communities where most Maronites in Israel reside are Haifa, Jish, Nazareth, Isfiya, Acre, Maker and Jaffa. In 2021, there were 3,500 Lebanese in Israel, who live mainly in Nahariya, Kiryat Shmona, Tiberias, Ma'alot and Haifa. Their main church is in Acre, Israel, and they tend to pray separately from other Maronites in Israel.

== Maronite Church in Israel ==
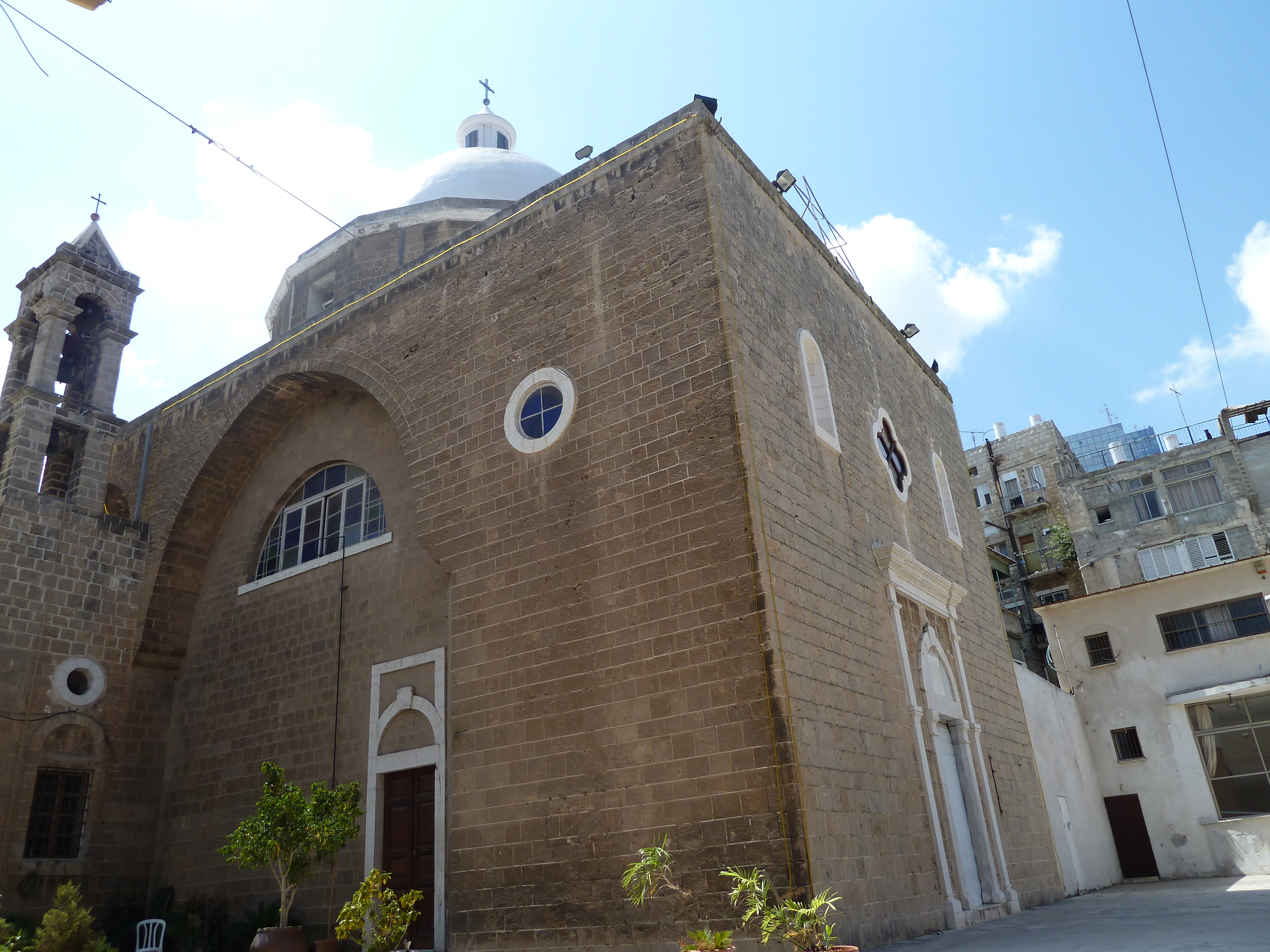
St. Louis the King Cathedral, Haifa

The Maronite Church has been in formal communion with the Roman Catholic Church since 1182. As an Eastern Catholic church (a sui juris Eastern Church in communion with Rome, which yet retains its own language, rites and canon law), it has its own liturgy, which basically follows the Antiochene rite in classical Syriac. The Maronite Patriarchal Vicariate in Jerusalem dates from 1895.

The Maronites in Israel and the Palestinian territories are subject to either the Maronite Catholic Archeparchy of Haifa and the Holy Land, or the Maronite Catholic Patriarchal Exarchate of Jerusalem and Palestine, both in turn subject to the Maronite Patriarch of Antioch, but since 1996 both these jurisdictions of the Maronite Church have been in the pastoral care of one single bishop, being united for now in persona episcopi. The current archbishop of Haifa and the Holy Land is Moussa El-Hage since 2012, succeeding original archbishop Paul Nabil El-Sayah. Between 1906 and 1996, the territory was part of the Maronite Catholic Archeparchy of Tyre, while Jerusalem was served by a patriarchal vicar.

According to the 2022 Annuario Pontificio, in 2021 the Maronite Catholic Archeparchy of Haifa and the Holy Land had 10,000 members, 6 parishes, 11 priests and 1 deacon. In 2020, the Maronite Catholic Patriarchal Exarchate of Jerusalem and Palestine had 504 members, 3 parishes, 1 priest and 1 deacon.

== Identity ==
=== Maronite Aramean identity ===
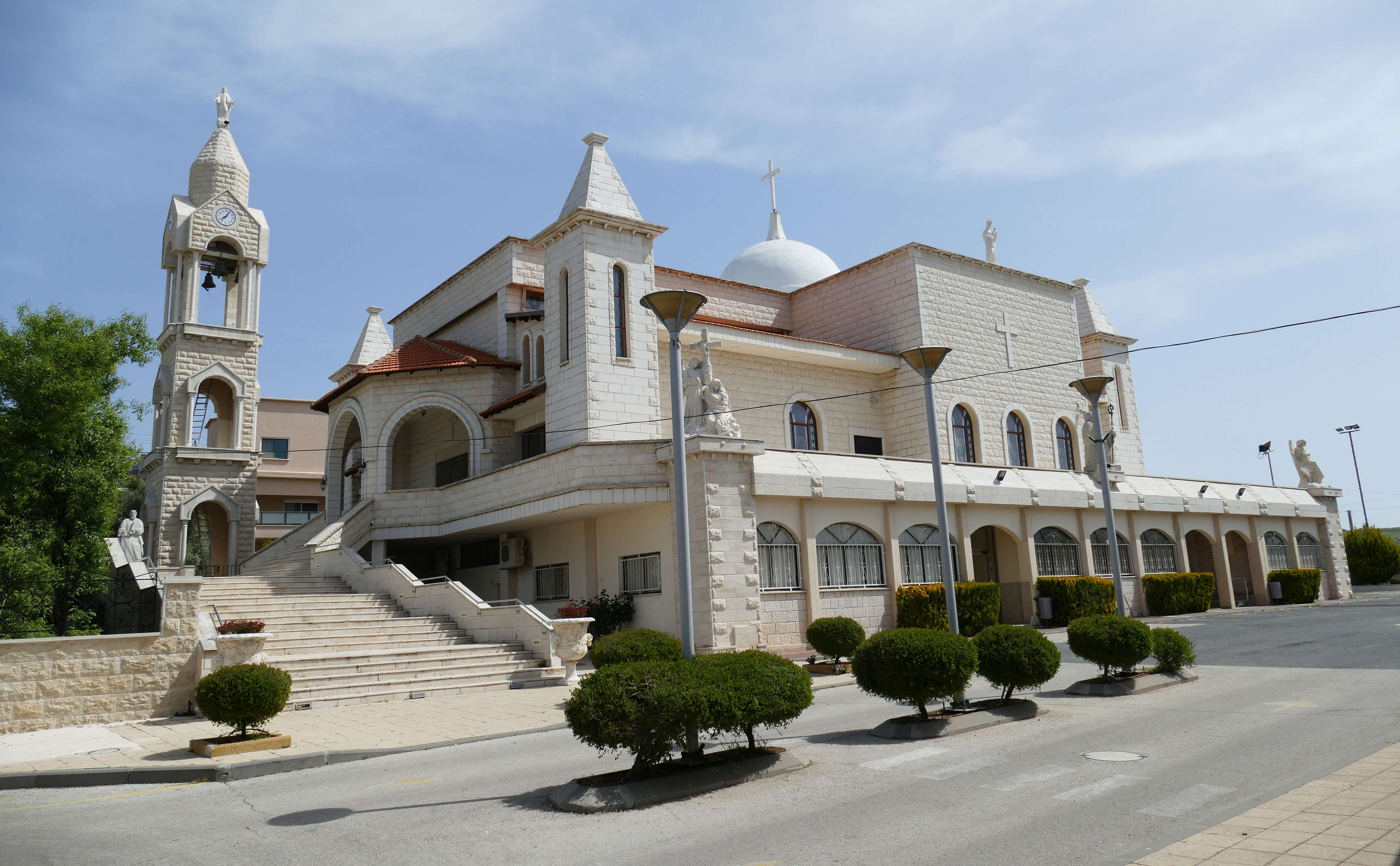
Mar Maroun Maronite Church in Jish, 2019

A study on Maronites' identity in Israel performed at Haifa University found that most of this community rejected Arab identity in favor of a distinct Maronite identity, and that many Maronite residents of Jish considered themselves Aramean Christian Maronites.

In 2014, Israel decided to recognize the Aramean community within its borders as a national minority, allowing some of the Christians in Israel to be registered as "Aramean", instead of "Arab" or "Unclassified". The Christians, who may apply for recognition as Aramean, are mostly Galilean Maronites, who trace part of their cultural identity to the Arameans.

=== Language ===
Traditionally, Neo-Aramaic had been the spoken language of the Maronites, even in Lebanon, up to the 17th century, when differing linguistic and sociological pressures caused Arabic to displace it as the main language, while the Classical Syriac variety of Aramaic remained in use only for liturgical purposes. In 2011, activists tried to revitalize Syriac by teaching it for young children in Jish Elementary School, with approval of the Israeli Ministry of Education. The program was implemented briefly by the school, but then quickly dropped.

== See also ==
- Arameans in Israel
- Assyrians in Israel
- Christianity in Israel
- Lebanese in Israel
- Jewish migration from Lebanon post-1948
