= Maronites =

Christian ethnoreligious group in the Levant

الموارنة
- Flag of the Maronites

Total population
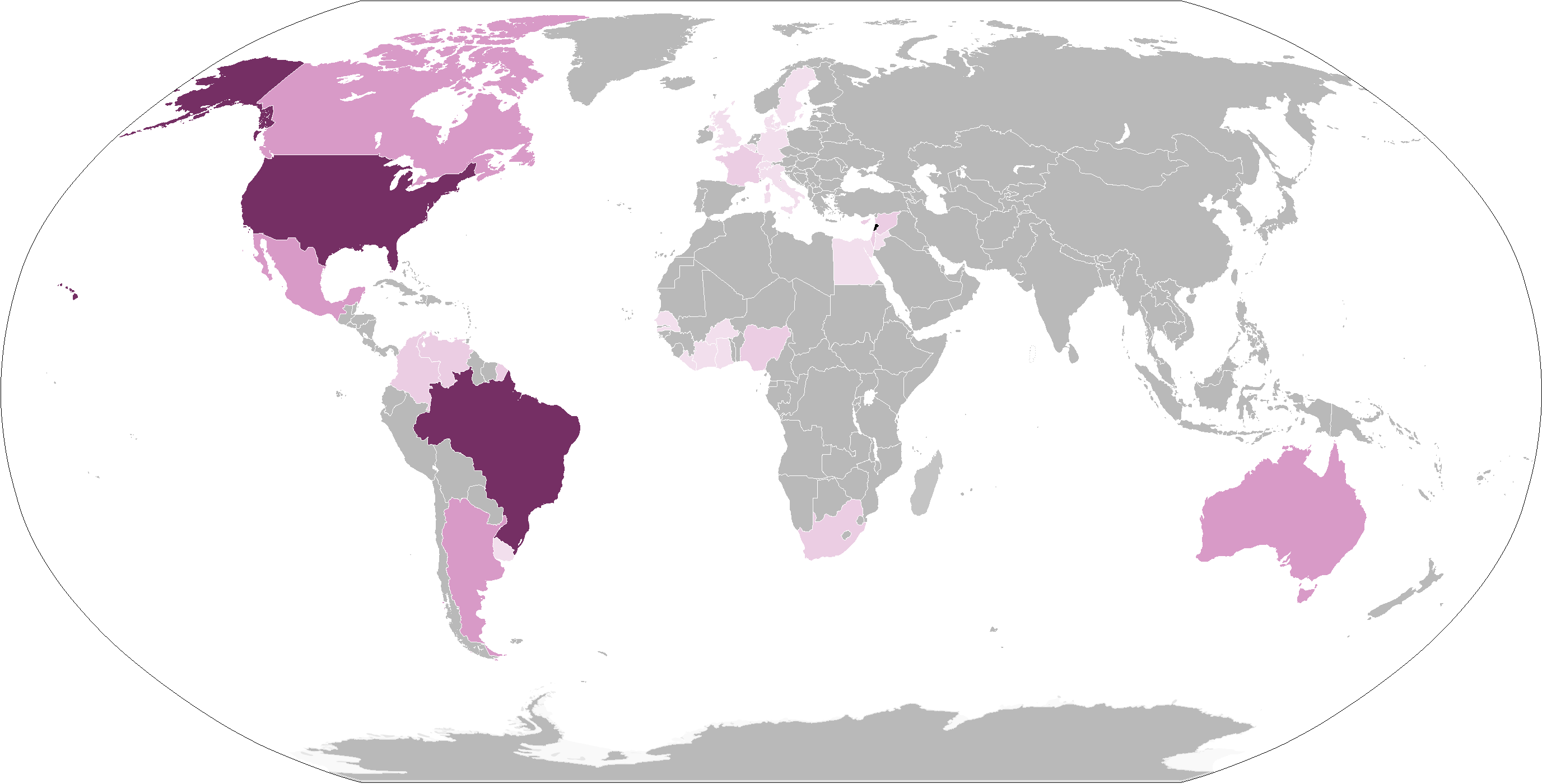
- c. 7–12 million

Regions with significant populations
- Lebanon 1.4 million (2006)
- Brazil: 3–4 million (incl. ancestry)
- United States: 1.2 million (incl. ancestry)
- Argentina: 764,115
- France: 285,520
- Mexico: 167,190
- Australia: 161,370
- Canada: 96,100
- Syria: 50,000–60,000
- Venezuela: 25,000
- South Africa: 20,000
- Cyprus: 13,170
- Israel: 10,000
- Egypt: 6,350 (Note: Numbers were higher before the 1956–1957 exodus and expulsions from Egypt)
- Nigeria: 5,850
- Germany: 5,400
- UK: 5,300
- Colombia: 5,050
- Belgium: 3,400
- Côte d'Ivoire: 2,250–3,000
- Italy: 2,500
- Sweden: 2,470
- Switzerland: 2,000
- Jordan: 1,000–1,500
- Jerusalem and Palestine: 513

Languages
- Vernacular: Arabic (Levantine Arabic, Cypriot Arabic), Aramaic (Note: Aramaic has been partially revitalized by some Maronite activists in Israel, especially in Jish); (Neo-Aramaic, Lebanese Aramaic (historical)); Liturgical: Classical Syriac and Classical Arabic

Religion
- Maronite Catholicism

Related ethnic groups
- Other Lebanese Christians

Maronites (Arabic: الموارنة, romanized: Al-Mawārinah; Syriac: ܡܖ̈ܘܢܝܐ, romanized: Mārōnōye) are a Syriac Christian ethnoreligious group native to the Eastern Mediterranean and the Levant (particularly Lebanon) whose members belong to the Maronite Church. The largest concentration has traditionally resided near Mount Lebanon in modern Lebanon. The Maronite Church is an Eastern Catholic sui iuris particular church in full communion with the pope and the rest of the Catholic Church.

The Maronites derive their name from Saint Maron (350–410 AD), a monk whose teachings spread throughout the Northern Levant becoming the basis of the Maronite tradition. The spread of Christianity was very slow in the Lebanese region; in the 5th century AD in the highlands they were still pagan. St. Maron sent the apostle Abraham of Cyrrhus known as the "Apostle of Lebanon" with a mandate to convert the pagan inhabitants of Mount Lebanon to Christianity. After their conversion, the inhabitants of the region renamed the Adonis River to the Abrahamic River in honor of the Saint who preached there.

The early Maronites were Hellenized Semites who spoke Greek and Syriac, yet identified with the Greek-speaking populace of Constantinople and Antioch. They were able to maintain an independent status in Mount Lebanon and its coastline after the Muslim conquest of the Levant, keeping their Christian religion, and even their distinct Lebanese Aramaic as late as the 19th century. While Maronites identify primarily as native Lebanese of Maronite origin, many identify as descendants of Phoenicians. Some Maronites argue that they are of Mardaite ancestry, while other historians, such as Clement Joseph David, the Syriac Catholic Archbishop of Damascus, reject this.

Mass emigration to the Americas at the outset of the 20th century, famine during World War I that killed an estimated one third to one half of the population, the 1860 Mount Lebanon conflict and the Lebanese Civil War between 1975 and 1990 greatly decreased their numbers in the Levant; however Maronites today form more than one quarter of the total population of modern-day Lebanon. Though concentrated in Lebanon, Maronites also show presence in the neighboring Levant, as well as a significant part in the Lebanese diaspora in the Americas, Europe, Australia, and Africa.

The Maronite Church, under the patriarch of Antioch, has branches in nearly all countries where Maronite Christian communities live, in both the Levant and the Lebanese diaspora.

The Maronites and the Druze founded modern Lebanon in Ottoman Lebanon in the early 18th century, through the ruling and social system known as the "Maronite-Druze dualism" in the Ottoman Mount Lebanon Mutasarrifate. All Lebanese presidents, with the exception of Charles Debbas and Petro Trad, have been Maronites as part of a continued tradition of the National Pact, by which the prime minister has historically been a Sunni Muslim and the speaker of the National Assembly has historically been a Shi'ite.

== Etymology ==
Maronites derive their name from Maron, a 4th-century Syriac Christian saint venerated by multiple Christian traditions. He is often conflated with John Maron, the first Maronite Patriarch, who ruled 685–707.

== History ==
=== Antiquity ===
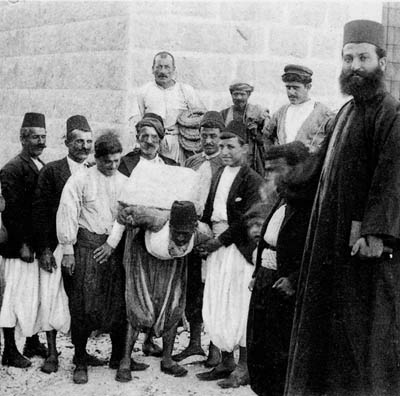
Maronite villagers building a church in the region of Mount Lebanon, 1920s.

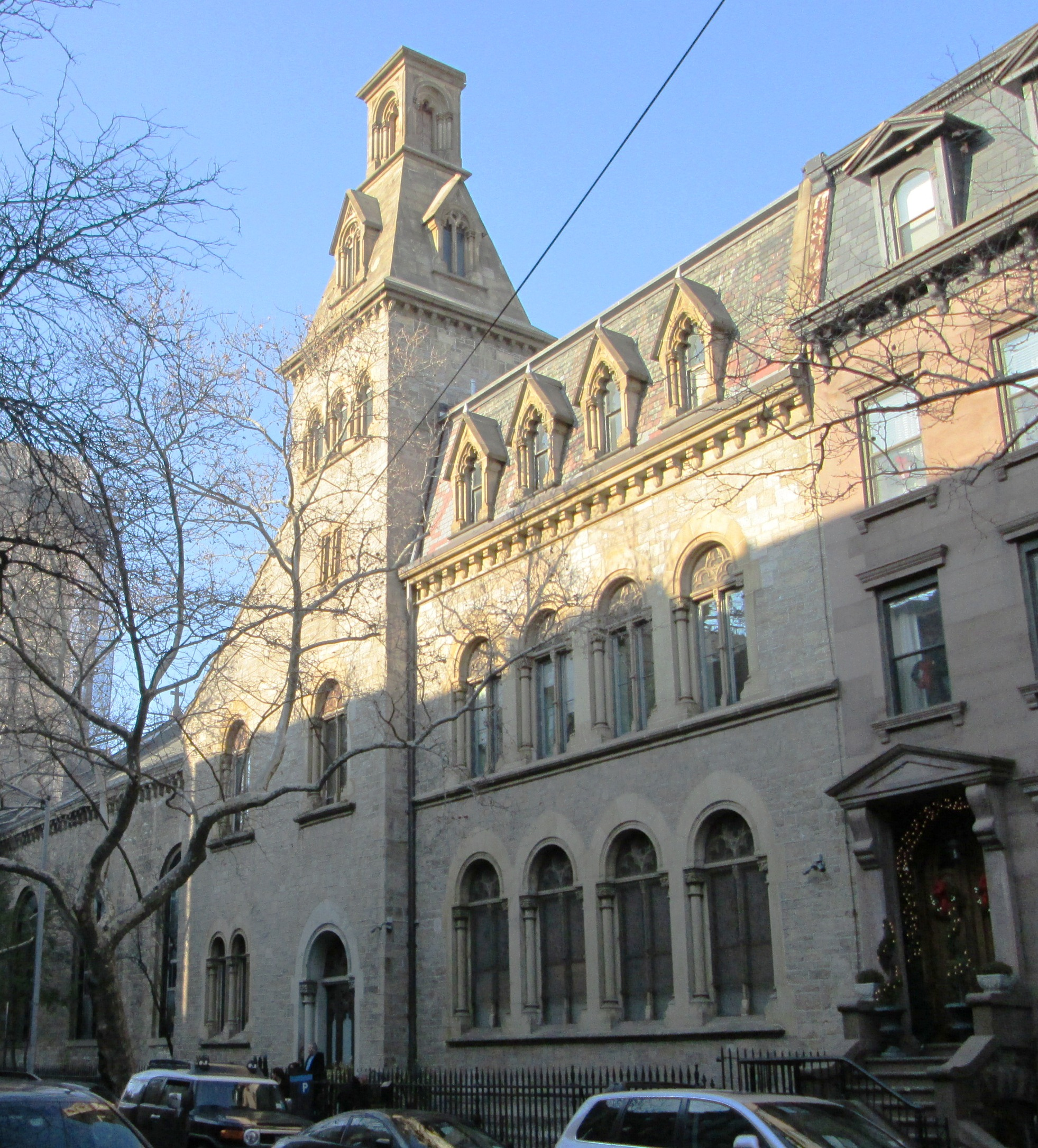
Our Lady of Lebanon Cathedral Brooklyn in New York City.

Although Christianity existed in Roman Phoenice since the time of the Apostles, Christians were a minority among the majority pagans by the time Emperor Theodosius I issued The Edict of Thessalonica in 380 AD. The coastal cities of Tyre and Sidon remained prosperous during Roman rule, but Phoenicia had ceased to be the maritime power centre it had once been centuries ago and the north of Berytus (Beirut) and the mountains of Lebanon concentrated a big part of the intellectual and religious activities. Very few Roman temples were built in the coastal cities, hence the reason for the reign of paganism in the interior of the land.

The Maronite movement reached Lebanon when in 402 AD Saint Maron's first disciple, Abraham of Cyrrhus, who was called the Apostle of Lebanon, realized that there were many non-Christians in Lebanon and so he set out to convert the Phoenician inhabitants of the coastal lines and mountains of Lebanon, introducing them to the way of Saint Maron. In 451 AD, the Maronites followed the Council of Chalcedon, rejecting both monophysitism and miaphysitism in favor of maintaining full communion with the majority of Christian churches in the Roman Empire. This conflict is thought to have resulted, among other things, in a massacre of 350 monks from the monastery of Maron in 517 AD, though the person who gave the order (some accuse the Monophysite Emperor Anastasius I, others the Miaphysite Severus of Antioch and Peter of Apamea) and the event itself have been debated.

Following the Muslim conquest of the Levant in 637 AD, the Christians living in the low lands and coastal cities began to settle in the Mount Lebanon area and to those coastal cities which did not particularly interest the Muslim Arabs; the area consisting of those regions extending from Sidon in the South and to Batroun and the south of Tripoli in the north. The Arab conquerors settled in various cities of the coast to reduce Byzantine interference even though they were not interested in maritime trade. Since the mountains offered no attraction to them, the Christians continued to settle in the Mountains of Lebanon. The Christians that chose to remain in the newly Arab-controlled areas and inhabited by the Arab invaders gradually became a minority and many of those converted to Islam in order to escape taxation and to further their own political and professional advancement.

=== Middle Ages ===
In 685 AD, St. John Maron became the first Patriarch of the Maronite Church. The appointing of a Patriarch made the Byzantine Emperor furious, which led to the persecution of the Maronites by the Byzantines. Following the Byzantine persecutions in the Orontes Valley, many Maronite monks left their lands in the Orontes Valley and took refuge in the mountains of Lebanon. The Maronite community migrated since the mid 7th century and through the 8th century, moving from the Orontes Valley in central Syria to Mount Lebanon, becoming the majority of the Christians in the hills around Tripoli and Byblos by the 10th century.

The Maronites managed then to become "civilly semiautonomous" where they settled and kept speaking Lebanese Aramaic in daily life and Classical Syriac for their liturgy.

The Maronites welcomed the conquering Christians of the First Crusade in 1096 AD. Around the late 12th century, according to William of Tyre, the Maronites numbered 40,000 people. During the several centuries of separation from the rest of the Christian world, they often claim to have been in full communion with the Catholic Church throughout.

Despite this, the majority of the accounts of those interacting with them at the time indicate that they were monothelites; notable figures from the era such as the medieval historian Jacques de Vitry and the chronicler of the Pope, William of Tyre affirming this, the latter of which (William Tyre) recorded both their kindness upon receiving him and the monothelitic views of which they recanted, stating; "The heresy of Maro and his followers is and was that in our Lord Jesus Christ, there exists and did exist from the beginning one will and one energy only, as may be learned from the sixth council, which as is well known, was assembled against them and in which they suffered sentence of condemnation. Now however...they repented all of these heresies and returned to the catholic church". The Maronites have also had a presence in Cyprus since the early 9th century and many Maronites went there following the Sultan Saladin's successful Siege of Jerusalem in 1187 AD.

=== Early modern period ===
In 1516, after the Ottomans had conquered Egypt and Syria, the areas inhabited by the Maronites became part of the Tripoli Eyalet which was placed under the authority of the governor of Damascus. Around the same time, the Maronites started reaching out to European states in order to seek a protective power, which finally resulted in France taking the role as protector of the Maronites in 1649. During the papacy of Pope Gregory XIII (1572–1585), steps were taken to bring the Maronites still closer to Rome. The Pontifical Maronite College (Pontificio Collegio dei Maroniti) was founded by Pope Gregory XIII in 1584. The Lebanese Council of 1736 was a major turning point for the Maronite Church that brought the Maronites closer to the Latin Church and was the only major Maronite council in modern times to elaborate rules and canons.

The relationship between the Druze and Christians has been characterized by harmony and peaceful coexistence, with amicable relations between the two groups prevailing throughout history, with the exception of some periods, including 1860 Mount Lebanon civil war. In the 19th century, thousands of Maronites were massacred by the Lebanese Druze during the 1860 conflict. According to some estimates about 11,000 Lebanese Christians (including Maronites) were killed; over 4,000 died from hunger and disease as a result of the war.

After the 1860 massacres, many Maronites fled to Egypt. Antonios Bachaalany, a Maronite from Salima (Baabda district) was the first emigrant to the New World, where he reached the United States in 1854 and died there two years later. The Ottoman authorities placed Lebanon in 1915 under direct military rule and abolished all privileges in Lebanon, including that of the Maronite Church. During the First World War, the French landed troops and had Lebanon fully occupied according to the secret Sykes–Picot Agreement and after the end of the war, the Maronite dream of having an independent state under French mandate was realised.

== Population ==
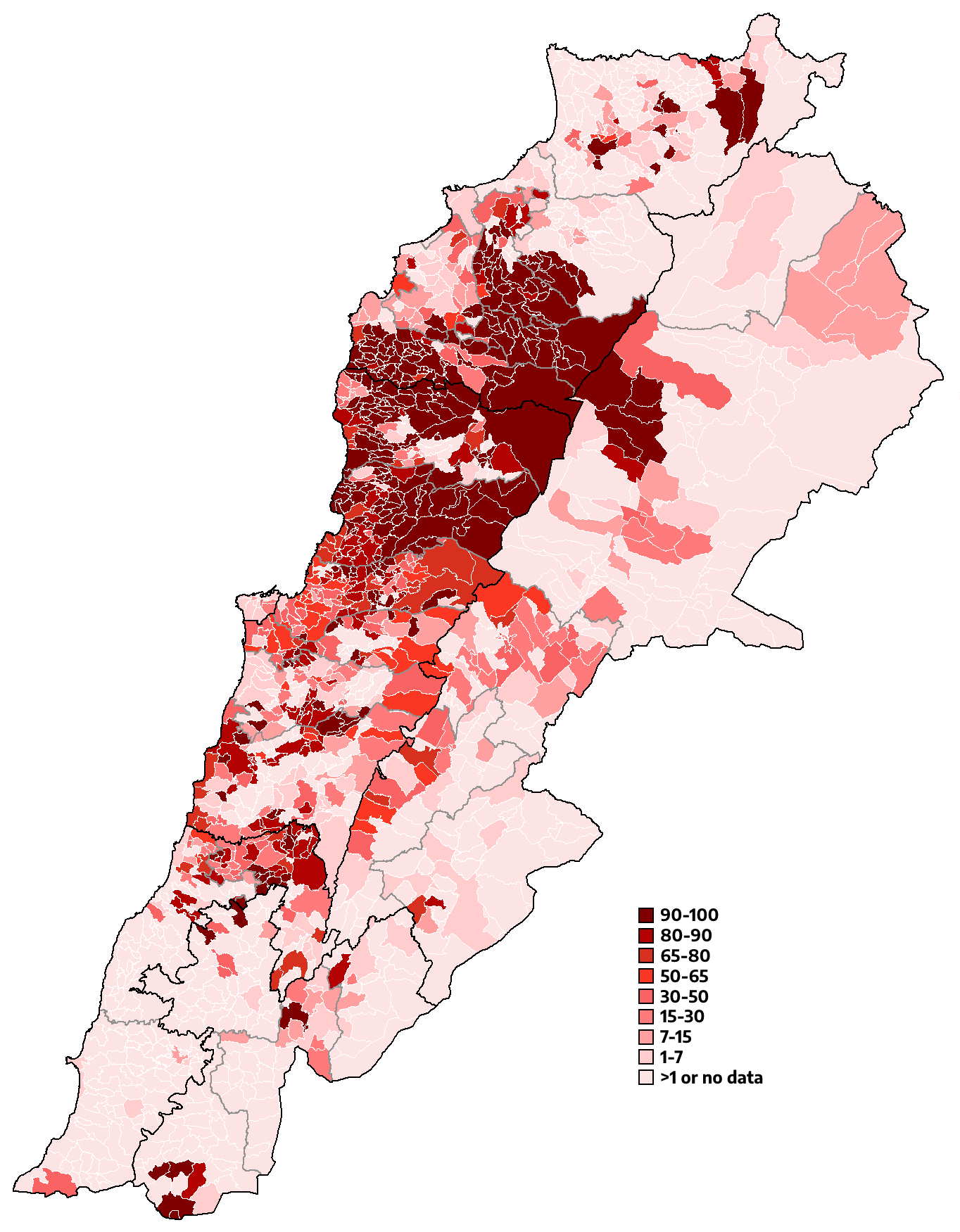
Distribution of Maronites in Lebanon

=== Lebanon ===
According to the Maronite church, there were approximately 1,062,000 Maronites in Lebanon in 1994, where they constitute up to 32% of the population. In the aftermath of the First World War, the Maronites successfully campaigned for Greater Lebanon carved out from Mount Lebanon and neighboring areas. Under the French Mandate, and until the end of the Second World War, the Maronites gained substantial influence. Post-independence, they dominated Lebanese politics until the 1975–1990 civil war, which ended their supremacy. While the Taif Accords weakened Maronite influence, it endures alongside other dominant Lebanese communities, such as the Shiites and Sunnis.

Lebanon's constitution was intended to guarantee political representation for each of the nation's religious groups. Under the terms of an unwritten agreement known as the National Pact between the various political and religious leaders of Lebanon, the president of the country must be a Maronite Christian.

=== Syria ===
There is also a small Maronite Christian community in Syria. In 2017, the Annuario Pontificio reported that 3,300 people belonged to the Archeparchy of Aleppo, 15,000 in the Archeparchy of Damascus and 45,000 in the Eparchy of Lattaquié). In 2015, the BBC placed the number of Maronites in Syria at between 28,000 and 60,000.

Many Maronites fled Syria due to the war, seeking refuge in Lebanon, Europe, or the Americas. The Maronite Archdiocese of Aleppo remains one of the main religious institutions, serving a community that practices the unique Syriac-Antiochene liturgical tradition, similar to their counterparts in Lebanon. However, the community has faced significant challenges due to sectarian violence and political instability. Despite these difficulties, the Maronite Church continues to play an active role in Syria, providing humanitarian aid and preserving its cultural and religious heritage.

=== Cyprus ===
Maronites first migrated to Cyprus in the 8th century, and there are approximately 5,800 Maronites on the island today, the vast majority in the Republic of Cyprus. The community historically spoke Cypriot Maronite Arabic, but today Cypriot Maronites speak the Greek language, with the Cypriot government designating Cypriot Maronite Arabic as a dialect.

=== Israel ===
A Maronite community of about 11,000 people lives in Israel. The 2017 Annuario Pontificio reported that 10,000 people belonged to the Maronite Catholic Archeparchy of Haifa and the Holy Land and 504 people belonged to the Exarchate of Jerusalem and Palestine.

=== Diaspora ===
According to various sources, the Maronite diaspora is estimated to be somewhere between 7 and 12 million individuals, much larger than the Maronite population living in their historic homelands in Lebanon, Syria, Cyprus, Israel, and Palestine. Due to cultural and religious assimilation, especially in the Americas, many Maronites or those of Maronite descent might not identify as Maronite or are unaware of their Maronite heritage.

According to the Annuario Pontificio, in 2020 the Eparchy of San Charbel in Buenos Aires, Argentina, had 750,000 members; in 2021 the Eparchy of Our Lady of Lebanon of São Paulo, Brazil, had 521,000 members; in 2020 the Eparchy of Saint Maron of Sydney, Australia, had 161,370 members; in 2020 the Eparchy of Saint Maron of Montreal, Canada, had 94,300 members; in 2021 the Eparchy of Our Lady of the Martyrs of Lebanon in Mexico had 167,190 members; in 2021 the Eparchy of Our Lady of Lebanon of Los Angeles in the United States had 47,480 members; in 2020 and the Eparchy of Saint Maron of Brooklyn in the United States had 23,939 members.

According to the Annuario Pontificio, 51,520 people belonged to the Maronite Catholic Eparchy of Our Lady of Lebanon of Paris in 2021. In Europe, some Belgian Maronites are involved in the trade of diamonds in the diamond district of Antwerp.

According to the Annuario Pontificio, 74,900 belonged to the Apostolic Exarchate of West and Central Africa (Nigeria) in 2020. The Diocese is centered in Ibadan, Nigeria and covers the countries of Angola, Benin, Burkina Faso, Cameroon, Central African Republic, Chad, Republic of the Congo, Democratic Republic of the Congo, Côte d'Ivoire, Equatorial Guinea, Gabon, Gambia, Ghana, Guinea, Guinea-Bissau, Liberia, Mali, Mauritania, Niger. Senegal, Sierra Leone and Togo.

== Role in politics ==
=== Lebanon ===
In 1920, Maronites played a key role in the establishment of Greater Lebanon by the French Mandate. With only two exceptions, all Lebanese presidents have been Maronites as part of a tradition that persists as part of the National Pact, by which the Prime Minister has historically been a Sunni Muslim and the Speaker of the National Assembly has historically been a Shia Muslim.

A unique feature of the Lebanese system is the principle of "confessional distribution": all religious communities have an allotted number of deputies in the Parliament. Thirty-four seats in parliament are reserved for Maronites. The largest party is the Lebanese Forces that receives most of its support from the Maronite Christians but it also supported by other Christian sects throughout the country. It has 19 seats in parliament, 11 of them being Maronite. The Phalange Party is a Christian-based political party of Maronite majority and former militia. it holds 4 of the 128 seats in parliament, all of which are Christian. As a militia, it played a pivotal role during the Lebanese Civil War as it controlled its own Maronite canton (Marounistan) as part of the Lebanese Front. The party is also led by the Gemayel family, a notable Maronite family based in the regions of Achrafieh and Metn which carries the legacy of Pierre and Bashir Gemayel.

The Free Patriotic Movement is a Christian-based political party which follows the agenda of former president Michel Aoun. It holds 17 seats of the 128 seats in Lebanon's parliament. The party has large support in Christian districts like Batroun and Jezzine. Other smaller Maronite-based parties that only receive local support include the Marada Movement, National Liberal Party and Independence Movement.

=== Israel and Palestine ===
People born into Christian families or clans who have either Aramaic heritage are considered an ethnicity separate from Israeli Arabs and since 2014 can register themselves as Arameans. Many of the Christians who have applied so far for recognition as Aramean are Galilean Maronites.

In addition, some 500 Christian adherents of the Syriac Catholic Church in Israel are expected to apply for the recreated ethnic status, as well as several hundred Aramaic-speaking adherents of the Syriac Orthodox Church. Though supported by Gabriel Naddaf, the move was condemned by the Greek Orthodox Patriarchate, which described it as "an attempt to divide the Palestinian minority in Israel".

== Religion ==
Maronite division among main Syriac Christian groups.

The Maronites belong to the Maronite Syriac Church of Antioch, an Eastern Catholic Syriac church using the Antiochian Rite, which traces its foundation to Maron, an early 4th-century Syriac monk venerated as a saint. The Maronite Church had returned to its communion with Rome since 1180 A.D., although the official view of the contemporary Maronite Church is that it had never accepted either the Monophysitic views held by their Syriac neighbours, which were condemned in the Council of Chalcedon, or the failed compromise doctrine of Monothelitism (despite overwhelming evidence to the contrary of the latter claim being found in contemporary and medieval sources, with evidence that they were staunchly Monothelites for several centuries, beginning in the early 7th century after their rejection of the sixth ecumenical council). The Maronite Patriarch is traditionally seated in Bkerke north of Beirut.

== Cultural identity ==
The Maronite Church belongs to the Syriac Christian tradition and to the West Syriac Rite; Classical Syriac remains the liturgical language of the Maronite Church, alongside Arabic.

During the 20th century most of the Maronite elite in Lebanon favored the development of a primarily Lebanese identity and its separation from the Pan-Arabist one, in favor of a policy that would bring the country closer to the Western world. Some Lebanese intellectuals, mainly Maronites, theorized Phoenicianism, which asserted the descent of the Lebanese people from the Phoenicians. Key figures of this movement were Charles Corm, Michel Chiha and Said Aql. Aql and Etienne Saqr went as far as voicing anti-Arab views. In his book the Israeli writer Mordechai Nisan quoted Aql as saying; "I would cut off my right hand, and not associate myself to an Arab." Aql believed in emphasizing the Phoenician legacy of Lebanon and had promoted the use of the Lebanese Arabic dialect written in a modified Latin alphabet, rather than the Arabic one. Phoenicianism is still disputed by many Arabist scholars who have on occasion tried to convince its adherents to abandon their claims as false, and to embrace and accept the Arab identity instead. Since the civil war and the Taif agreement, Lebanese Phoenicianism is restricted to a small group.

On an Al Jazeera special dedicated to the political Christian clans of Lebanon and their struggle for power in the 2009 election entitled, "Lebanon: The Family Business", the issue of identity was brought up on several occasions. Sami Gemayel, of the Gemayel clan, stated he did not consider himself an Arab but instead identified himself as a Syriac Christian, going on to explain that to him and many Lebanese the "acceptance" of Lebanon's "Arab identity" according to the Taif Agreement was not something that they "accepted" but instead were forced into signing through pressure. In a speech to a crowd of Kataeb supporters, Gemayel declared that he felt there was importance in Christians in Lebanon finding an identity and went on to state what he finds identification with as a Lebanese Christian, concluding with a purposeful exclusion of Arabism in the segment.

Between the 19th and 20th centuries, within the Nahda and the Mahjar, many Maronite intellectuals contributed to the formation of modern Arab identity and Arab nationalism. Key figures include Naguib Azoury, Ameen Rihani and Kahlil Gibran. Youssef Bey Karam, a Maronite leader during the 19th century, in a letter to Emir Abdelkader encouraged him to liberate all Arabs from the Ottoman Empire and then establishing an Arab Union. Maronite Deacon Soubhi Makhoul, administrator for the Maronite Exarchate in Jerusalem, said "The Maronites are Arabs, we are part of the Arab world. And although it's important to revive our language and maintain our heritage, the church is very outspoken against the campaign of these people." Suleiman Frangieh, leader of the Marada Movement, has often affirmed the belonging of the Maronite community to the Arab world and the importance of its adherence to Arabism.

In Israel, some members of the local Maronite community have adopted an Aramean identity and organized linguistic revitalization programs. The Aramean identity was officially recognized by the Israeli Minister of the Interior in 2014, allowing certain Christian families to register their ethnicity as "Aramean" rather than "Arab" or "Unclassified." A slight majority of the Maronites in Israel identify themselves as Arabs; the Arab identity is prevalent especially among the young and among women.

== See also ==
- Christianity in Lebanon
- List of Maronites
- Maronite politics
- Maronite Christianity in Lebanon
- Syriac Christianity

== Bibliography ==
- Moosa, Matti (2005). The Maronites in History. New York: Gorgias Press. ISBN 1-59333-182-7.
- Mourkazel, Joseph (15 December 2020). "Maronite Christians". In Raheb, Mitri; Lamport, Mark A. (eds.). The Rowman & Littlefield Handbook of Christianity in the Middle East. Rowman & Littlefield. ISBN 978-1-5381-2418-5.
