= Assyrians in Israel =

Ethnic group in Israel

- (Assyrian homeland) (Israel)
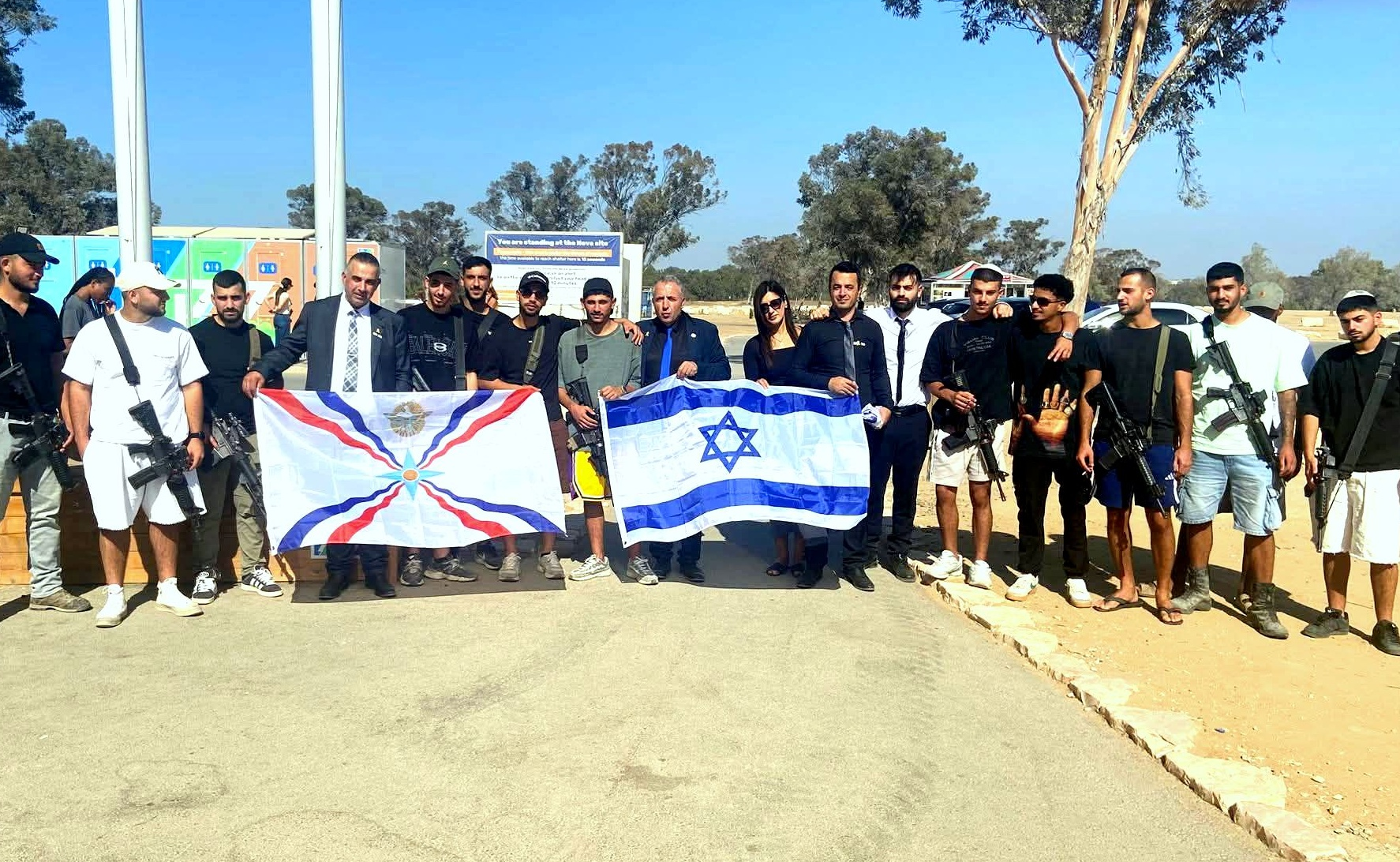
- Assyrians at the Nova music festival site demonstrating their respect and solidarity with Israelis following the 7 October attacks

Total population
- 1,000

Regions with significant populations
- Jerusalem, Bethlehem

Languages
- Levantine Arabic, Neo-Aramaic, Modern Hebrew

Religion
- Syriac Orthodox Church, Syriac Catholic Church, Chaldean Catholic Church

Related ethnic groups
- Arameans in Israel, Maronites in Israel

Assyrians in Israel (Hebrew: האשורים בישראל; Arabic: آشُورِيُّون في إسرائيل) are Assyrians living in State of Israel, totaling approximately 1,000 individuals.

The Assyrian community in Israel was shaped in part by migration from other parts of the Middle East, including during the period of large-scale Jewish emigration from the region. Assyrian Jews, also known as Kurdistani Jews in reference to their geographic origins, are speakers of Northeastern Neo-Aramaic dialects and constitute a distinct Jewish community in Israel.

== History ==
The Assyrian presence in the Israel mainly originated from those who fled the Assyrian genocide from Tur Abdin in 1915. Many found refuge in what was known as the "Syriac Quarter" in Bethlehem and the since destroyed "Syriac Quarter" in the Old City of Jerusalem, squeezed between the Armenian Quarter and the Jewish Quarter at the Old City’s southern end. According to Roads & Kingdoms, following the Six-Day War, the houses in the Syriac quarter were either demolished alongside the Mughrabi Quarter, or reassigned to the Jewish quarter.

It is estimated that 65% of Syriacs who inhabited the Holy Land at the beginning of 1967 left the region (mostly Jerusalem and Bethlehem) in the following years.

Israeli Prime Minister Benjamin Netanyahu publicly acknowledged the early 20th-century Ottoman Empire massacres of Assyrians, Armenians, and Greeks as genocide during an interview on August 26, 2025. The remarks broke with Israel's long-standing policy of avoiding official recognition of these historical genocides to maintain relations with Turkey. The statement arrived amid escalating political tensions and public criticism between Netanyahu and Turkish President Recep Tayyip Erdoğan regarding the military campaign in Gaza.

== Religion ==
Assyrians are predominantly Christians of the East and West Syriac Rite. The majority of Assyrians in Israel are adherents of the Syriac Orthodox Church, while a smaller community of Catholic Assyrians also exists.

=== Orthodox Assyrians ===
==== Syriac Orthodox Church ====
The Syriac Orthodox Church is the largest Assyrian church in Israel, covered by the Archbishopric of Israel, Palestine and Jordan under the spiritual guidance and direction of Archbishop Gabriel Dahho.

The most notable Syriac Orthodox monastery in Israel is the Monastery of Saint Mark in the Old City of Jerusalem. The Syriac Orthodox Church also has sharing rights to the Church of the Holy Sepulchre and minor rights to the Tomb of the Virgin Mary, where they possess an altar on the western side of the site.

=== Catholic Assyrians ===
==== Syriac Catholic Church ====
The Syriac Catholic Church has a Patriarchal Exarchate formed in 1892, based out of the Church of Saint Thomas in Jerusalem. As of 2015, there are three parishes in Israel with an estimated 3,000 adherents.

==== Chaldean Catholic Church ====
Since 1903, the Chaldean Catholic Church has been represented in Jerusalem by a non-resident patriarchal vicar. In 1997, the Chaldean Catholic Church established the Territory Dependent on the Patriarch which was previously governed as the Patriarchal Vicariate of Jerusalem within the Patriarch's own archeparchy.

== Gallery ==
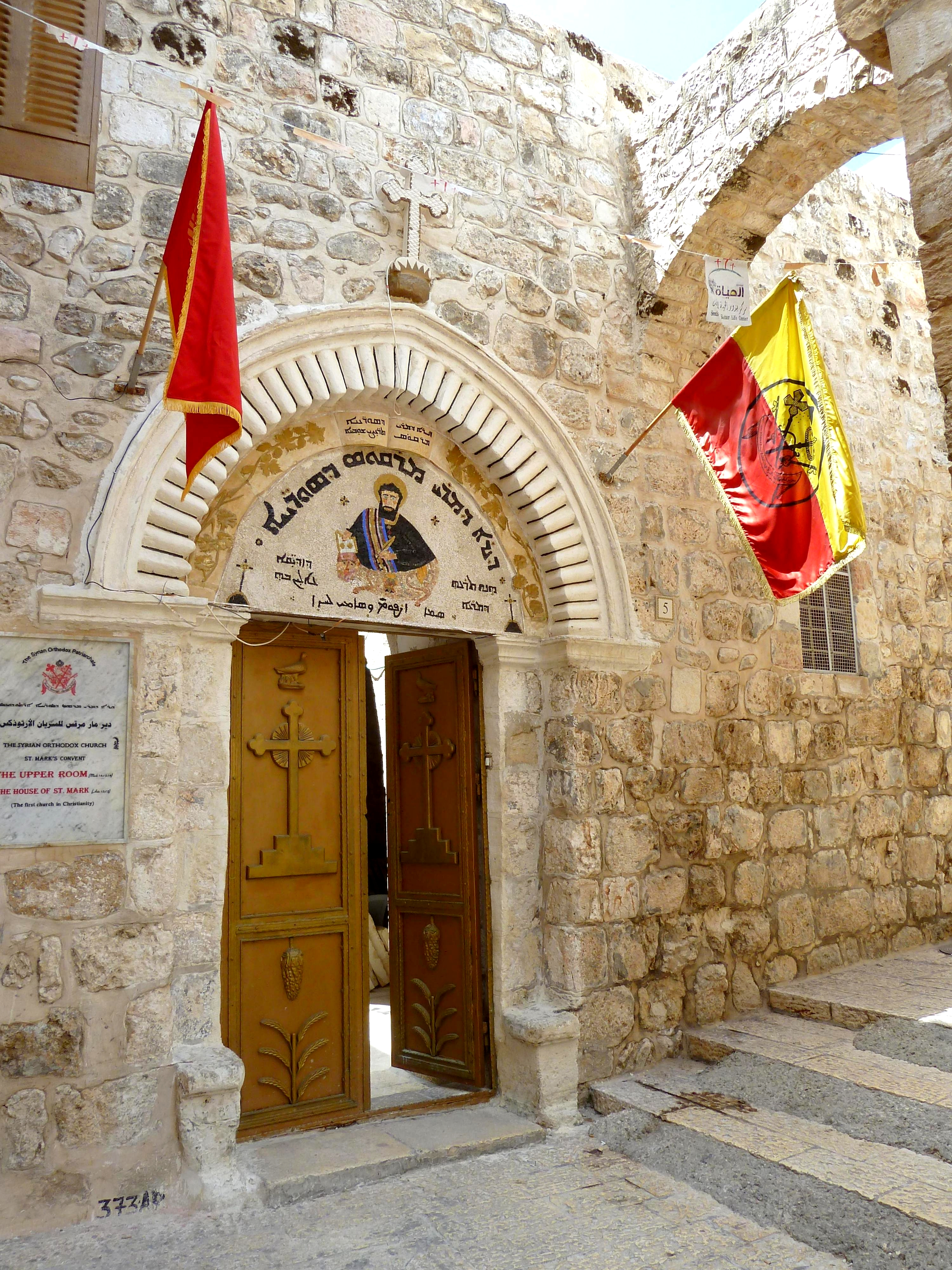
Syriac Orthodox monastery of Saint Mark, in the Old City of Jerusalem

Pre-1948 distribution of modern Judeo-Aramaic languages and dialects

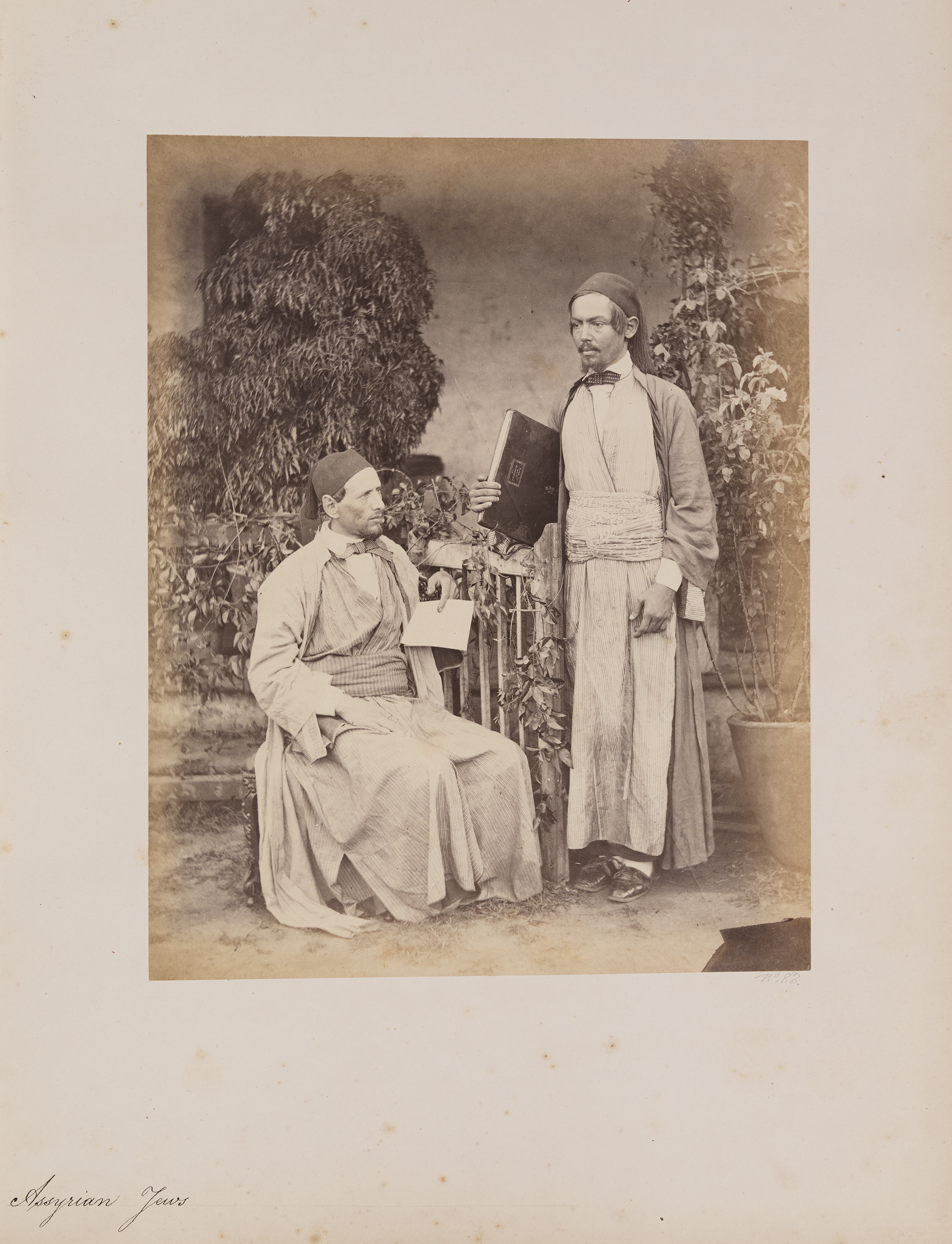
Assyrian Jews

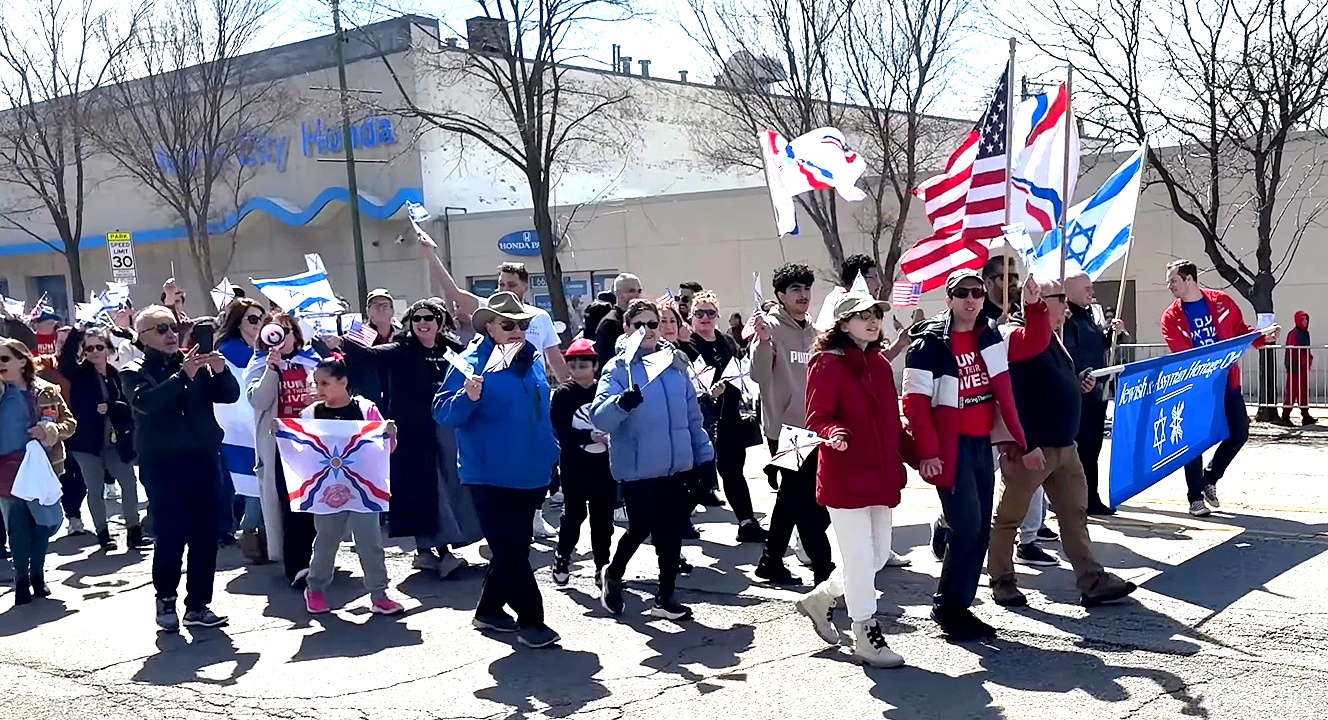
Assyrian and Jewish Americans participating in the Assyrian New Year parade in Chicago, where they express support for Israel

== See also ==
- Assyrians in Palestine
- Christianity in Israel
- Assyrian homeland
- History of the Jews in Kurdistan
