= Lebanese Aramaic =

Extinct or dormant Aramaic dialect of Lebanon

- Native to: Levant (Especially Mount Lebanon)
- Ethnicity: Maronites
- Extinct: c. 19th-century
- Language family: Afro-Asiatic: Semitic; West Semitic; Central Semitic; Northwest Semitic; Aramaic; Western Aramaic; Lebanese Aramaic

Language codes
- ISO 639-3: –

Lebanese Aramaic refers to the extinct varieties of Western Aramaic historically spoken in what is now Lebanon. It was traditionally spoken in the Levant, especially in Mount Lebanon, by Maronite Christians.

== Name ==
Similar to Christian Palestinian Aramaic, Lebanese Aramaic did not have a unique name as a dialect or language in contemporary sources.

The term Syriac was used in medieval times to refer to all dialects of Aramaic, not just the Edessan dialect, as the term Aramaic held negative pagan connotations for the Christianized Arameans, thenceforth called Syrians.

== History ==
Map showing timeline of Aramaic speaking areas in the Middle East

Since ancient times the Arameans inhabited the mountainous regions of Lebanon speaking Aramaic while the Canaanites on the coast spoke Phoenician. During the prominence of the Neo-Assyrian Empire in the 7th century BC Aramaic spread throughout the entire Near East and beyond becoming the lingua franca of the region. When the Arameans adopted Christianity they started to refer to themselves as Syrian and their language as Syriac. Aramaic became the common language in Lebanon, besides Greek in prominent cities and Latin in Beirut. During the Arabic (Islamic) conquest the Levant, Arabic supplanted Aramaic and gradually became the dominant language in the region, although it was already present in the Ghassanid kingdom. However, the Maronites who isolated themselves within Mount Lebanon maintained their language.

Aramaic remained the sole vernacular language of the Maronites until the 14th century when the Mamluks conquered North Lebanon. This led to the mountainous Maronites to interact with the coastal city dwelling Arabs and subsequently begin to learn Arabic. Thus, many Maronites began to learn and speak both Aramaic and Arabic however those in more remote mountainous areas often were versed in Aramaic alone. The influence of Arabic gradually eroded the knowledge of Aramaic among the Maronites as more and more Maronites began to adopt Arabic as their first language with Aramaic being prominent only among those in more mountainous regions as well as among the clergy and some nobles. The Maronite Church's decision to shift more towards Arabic in documents and liturgy also expedited the process. The Maronites of Aleppo switched to Arabic with Syriac only being in liturgical use by the end of the 17th century. The last native speakers of the language in Lebanon were recorded in the late 19th century with Arabic having become the dominant language of Lebanon at this point.

== Influence ==
Many words in the Lebanese Arabic dialect today have Aramaic roots along with many Lebanese villages and personal names which have retained their Syriac names. The local oral poetry zajal still contains much of the Syriac metrical system in its recitation. According to Robert Gabriel, a professor of Syriac and president of the Association of Syriac Language Friends, about 50 percent of the Lebanese grammatical structure is due to Syriac influences.

=== Toponyms ===
Many villages, towns and cities in Lebanon bear toponyms of Aramaic origin. A study is currently being conducted by professor Elie Wardini of Stockholm University on "Aramaic in Lebanese Place Names." According to his findings: Of the ca. 25000 place names in the database included in this study (covering all the regions of Lebanon; compared to Wardini 2002 which included 1700 names covering North Lebanon and Mount Lebanon), we expect that some 36%, i.e. some 9000 place names will be Aramaic, a large enough sample where much of the phonology and morphology and part of the lexicon of Lebanese Aramaic can be elucidated. Given the nature of Lebanese place names, the description of syntax is expected to be more limited.

Lebanese toponyms of Aramaic origin proposed by Wardini 2002
| Toponym | Syriac word | Arabic word | English translation |
|---|---|---|---|
| Ain/Ayn | ܥܝܢܐ | عَيْن /ʕajn/ | Spring |
| Beit/B | ܒܝܬ | بَيْت /bajt/ | House of |
| Kfar | ܟܦܪܐ | كَفْر* /kafr/ | Village |
| Kifa | ܟܐܦܐ | - | Stone |
| Majd | ܡܓܕܠܐ | مِجْدَل* /mid͡ʒdal/ | Tower |
| Mar | ܡܪܝ | مَار* /maːr/ | Saint |
| Mayy | ܡܝܐ | مَاء /maːʔ | Water |
| Qarn/Qorn | ܩܪܢܐ | قَرْن /qarn/ | Summit/Horn |
| Tur or Turo | ܛܘܼܪ or ܛܘܪܐ | طُور* /tˤuːr/ | Mount or Mountain |

*Aramaic loanwords in Arabic, other words are cognates from a shared Proto-Semitic origin.

=== Vocabulary ===
Many Aramaic words and expressions have survived the transition to Arabic. Examples of such in the Lebanese dialect include eimata (or when), bobo (baby), ta'awa (to be late), wawa (ouch/it hurts), jawwa (inside), barra (outside), bobi (little dog/puppy), zoum (juice), zouwédé (provisions), shlaħ (to undress) and beit (house or family).

According to Lebanese American historian Philip K. Hitti:

A large number of plants in this conquered area, both wild and domestic, have preserved their pre-Arab Semitic names. Technical terms used in farming and agriculture are mostly Syriac and Aramaic, as are terms relating to theology and ritual (such as 'imad, baptism; karz, preaching; qissīs, monk; mazmūr, psalm).
