= Yafa an-Naseriyye =

Arab town near Nazareth, Israel

Yafa an-Naseriyye: יָפִיעַ; يافة الناصرة
- Local council (from 1960)

Hebrew transcription(s)
  - Also spelled: Yafia (official); Yafa (unofficial)
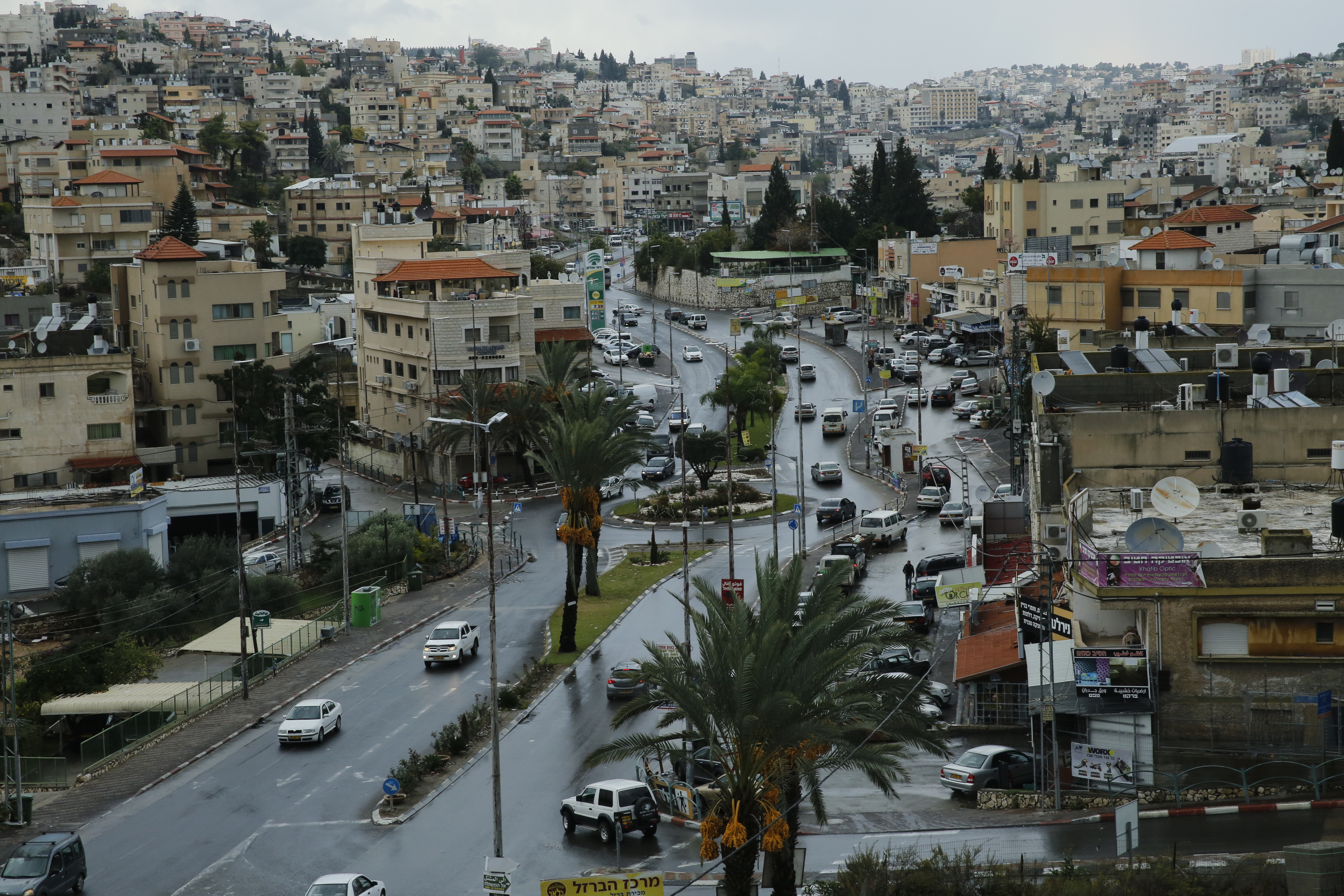

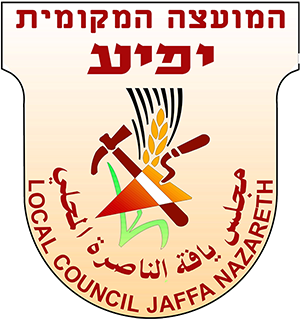

- Location within Jezreel Valley region of Israel
- Coordinates: 32°41′09″N 35°16′28″E
- Grid position: 176/232 PAL
- Country: Israel
- District: Northern
- Subdistrict: Jezreel
- Natural Region: Nazareth-Tir'an Mountains

Area
  - Total: 4,087 dunams (4.087 km^{2}; 1.578 sq mi)

Population (2024)
  - Total: 18,837
  - Density: 4,609/km^{2} (11,940/sq mi)

Yafa an-Naseriyye (Arabic: يافة الناصرة, also Jaffa of Nazareth, or simply Yafa, Kfar Yafia or Yafi Arabic: يافا, يفيع, Hebrew: יָפִיעַ) is an Arab town in Israel. It forms part of the metropolitan area of Nazareth, also an Arab locality. Declared a local council in 1960, it had a population of 18,837 in 2024, approximately 80.7% of whom were Muslim and 19.3% Christian.

== History ==
Yafa an-Naseriyye is an ancient town where rock-cut tombs and cisterns have been found. Pottery finds date to the Iron Age IIA-B (late tenth and ninth centuries BCE), Hellenistic (late second and early first centuries BCE.), and Roman era (first to fourth century).

=== Ancient period ===
Yafa was a vassal of Megiddo in the fourteenth century BCE, according to the Amarna letters.

It has been identified with the ancient town of Japhia, mentioned in the Book of Joshua as a border town belonging to Zebulun.

=== Classical antiquity ===
First-century Jewish historian Josephus mentions the city Japha (Yafa) in his Life of Flavius Josephus (§ 37 and 45) and The Jewish War (Book 3, chapter 7, verse 31). He describes Japha as the largest village in Galilee, where he resided for a time and fortified it in 66 CE. Josephus also details the village's capture during the First Jewish–Roman War by the Roman army under M. Ulpius Traianus and Titus in the spring of 67 CE.

Chambers, cut in stone, three storeys high, have been found in the village. This was probably an old granary. Victor Guérin noted that when one of the chambers was cleared out in 1869, a vase was found containing about two hundred coins of Roman emperors. According to his observations, there were two of the subterranean systems, one of which is described above, both of which have suffered considerable damage since they were first visited by him in 1870. He found nothing of the ancient town, except five or six fragments of columns, broken stones, and about thirty cisterns. The city formerly included three adjacent hills. A stone quarry, also dating from the Roman period, has been excavated. It was in use from the late first century CE to the mid-fourth century CE.

The remains of a synagogue, initially reported by Vincent in the 1920s, were later excavated by Sukenik in 1950, confirming the site's identification. The excavation of the building, which is approximately 19 meters long and oriented east-west, only revealed partial details of its plan. Mosaic fragments discovered during the excavation hinted at a central motif — a large circle with 12 smaller dots — suspected to represent either a zodiac, or, as suggested by Sukenik, depicting the Twelve Tribes of Israel. One notable discovery from the synagogue is an Aramaic mosaic fragment from its floor, showcasing three Hebrew letters (possibly signifying the last letters of the name Ephraim), next to the head of an animal. This finding dates back to the 3rd to 4th centuries AD.

=== Middle Ages ===
Local medieval tradition holds that Zebedee and his two sons, the Apostles James and John lived in Yafa. As the first to mention this tradition was Marinus Sanutus, it was most likely a Crusader-era invention.

=== Mamluk period ===
Remains of a building from the Mamluk era has been excavated, with pottery sherds from that period.

=== Ottoman period ===
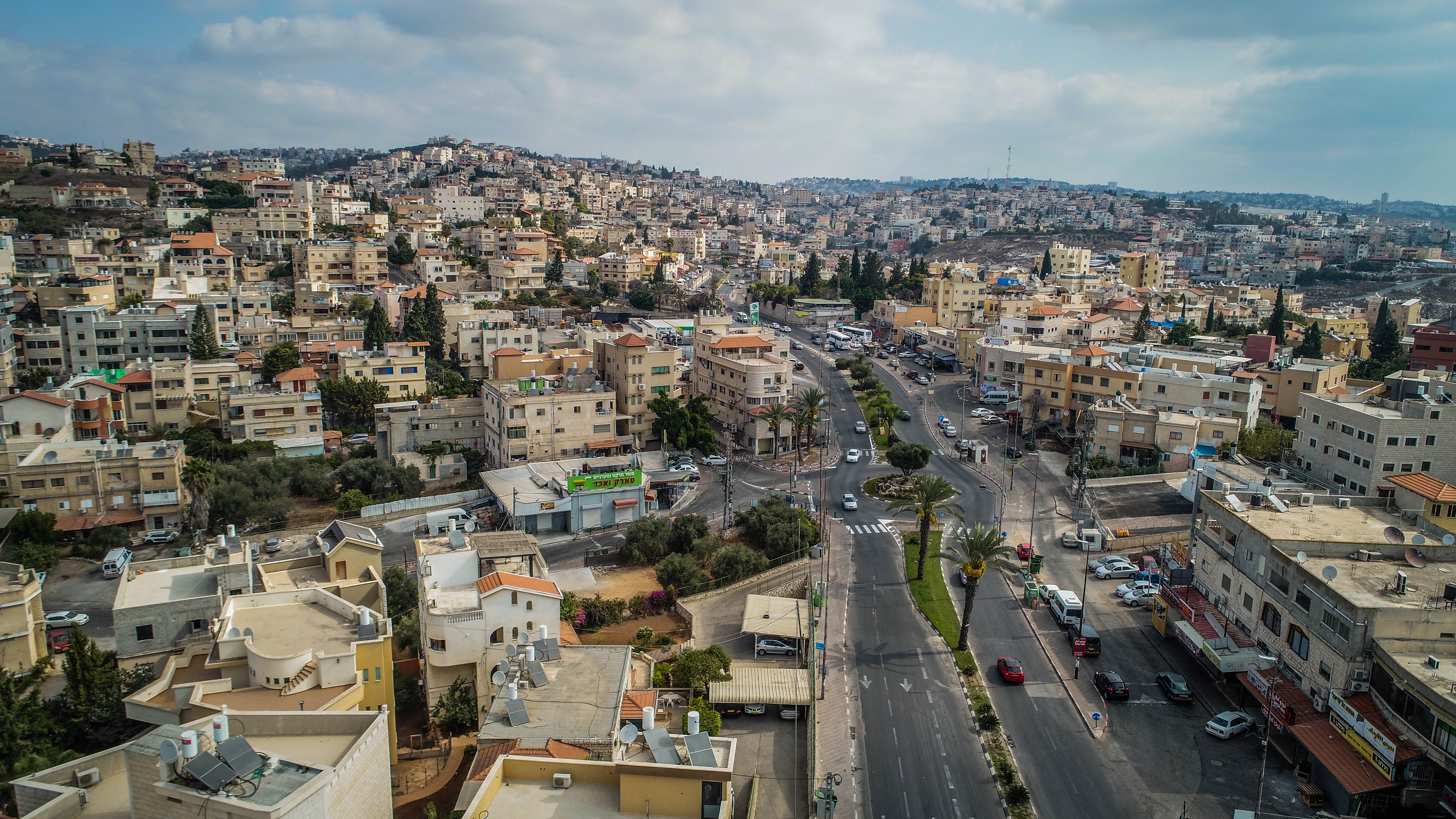
View of Yafa an-Naseriyye

In 1517, the village was incorporated into the Ottoman Empire with the rest of Palestine, and in 1596 it appeared in the Ottoman tax registers as being in the nahiya ("Subdistrict") of Tabariyya under the Liwa ("District") of Safad with a population of 14 Muslim households. The villagers paid a fixed tax rate of 25% on wheat, barley, fruit trees, goats and beehives, in addition to occasional revenues; a total of 2,200 akçe.

A map from Napoleon's invasion of 1799 by Pierre Jacotin showed the place, named as Iaffa.

In 1838 Edward Robinson described it as a small village, with 30 houses and the remains of a church. He further noted it as a Muslim and Greek Christian village in the Nazareth district.

When Guérin visited in 1875, he found 400 inhabitants including Latins, Greek Orthodox, and Moslems. There were also Protestant schools in the village.

In 1881, the PEF's Survey of Western Palestine (SWP) described it as a "moderate-sized village in a strong position on the spur running from Nazareth down to Jebata. It has a well to the north side and a second in the valley to the north-east."

A population list from about 1887 showed that Yafa had about 900 inhabitants; half Muslims, half Christians.

=== British Mandate ===
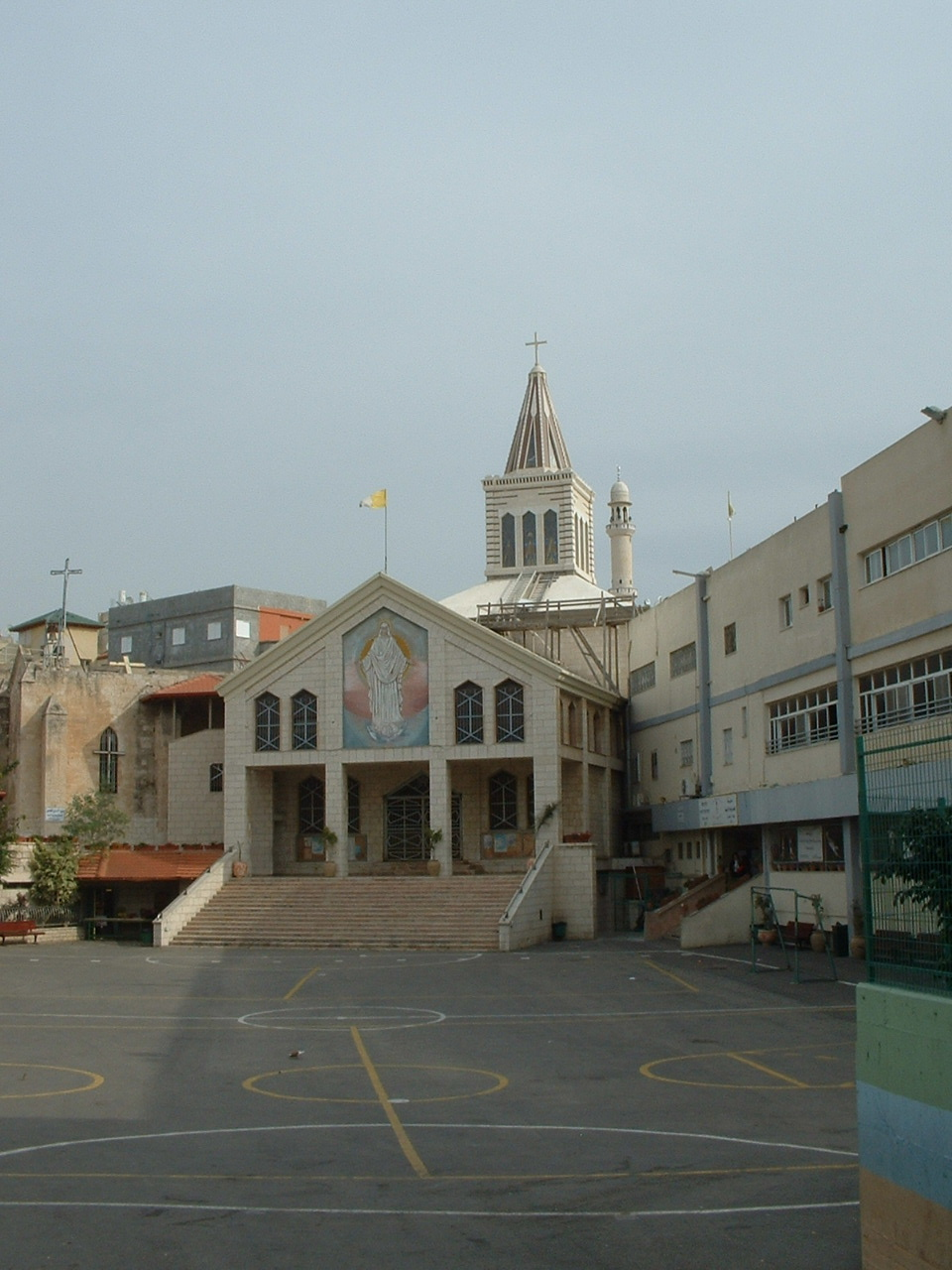
Roman Catholic church in Kfar Yafia with a minaret visible behind it

In the 1922 census of Palestine conducted by the British Mandate authorities, Yafa had a total population of 615; 215 Muslims and 400 Christians, Of the Christians, 168 were Orthodox, 112 Catholics, 108 Greek Catholic (Melchite) and 12 Anglicans. The population had increased at the 1931 census, when Yafa, (including Arab el Ghazzalin), had a population of 833; 456 Muslims and 377 Christians, in a total of 213 houses.

In the 1945 statistics the population size of Yafa was 1,070; 580 Muslims and 490 Christians, with a total of 17,809 dunams of land, according to an official land and population survey. Of this, 710 dunams were plantations and irrigable land, 12,701 used for cereals, while 149 dunams were built-up (urban) land.

In 1921, a synagogue lintel was found there, and in 1950 part of a synagogue paved with mosaics was excavated near the Greek Orthodox church.

=== State of Israel ===
In 1948 Yafa was captured by the Israeli army during Operation Dekel which was launched in July. The remaining population were put under martial law which remained in force until 1966.

A substantial portion of Yafa's population today are the descendants of internally displaced Palestinian Arabs from the neighbouring village of Ma'alul which was depopulated during the 1948 Arab–Israeli war. People from Ma'alul participated in the local elections in Yafa under the banner of the "Ma'alul refugees' party", with a platform also focused on issues of interest or concern to the wider population, as a way of attracting political support from local parties.

== Demographics ==
Historical population
Year	Pop.	±%
1972	5,100	—
1983	7,900	+54.9%
1995	12,600	+59.5%
2008	16,200	+28.6%
2022	18,113	+11.8%
2024	18,837	+4.0%

== Economy ==
In 2015, SanDisk Israel opened an R&D center in Kfar Yafia.

== Voting Patterns ==
In the 2022 election, 92 percent of voters in Yafa an-Naseriyye voted for the Arab parties, while 4 percent voted for the parties of the center-left coalition led by Yair Lapid and 3 percent voted for the parties of the right-wing coalition led by Benjamin Netanyahu. Among the voters for the Arab parties, 48 percent voted for the Hadash–Ta'al list, while 29 percent voted for Balad and 23 percent voted for Ra'am.

In the 2026 election, 93 percent of voters in Yafa an-Naseriyye voted for the Arab parties, while 4 percent voted for the parties of the center-left coalition led by Gadi Eisenkot and 1 percent voted for the parties of the right-wing coalition led by Benjamin Netanyahu. Among the voters for the Arab parties, 79 percent voted for the Joint List, while 21 percent voted for Ra'am. Voter turnout increased 72 percent from the 2022 election.

== Notable people ==
- Gabriel Naddaf
- Iman Khatib-Yassin is a resident.

== See also ==
- Arab localities in Israel
- Cities in the Book of Joshua

== Bibliography ==
- Alexandre, Yardenna (2012-10-03). "Yafi'a Final report" (124). Hadashot Arkheologiyot – Excavations and Surveys in Israel.
- Barron, J.B., ed. (1923). Palestine: Report and General Abstracts of the Census of 1922. Government of Palestine.
- Conder, C.R.; Kitchener, H.H. (1881). The Survey of Western Palestine: Memoirs of the Topography, Orography, Hydrography, and Archaeology. Vol. 1. London: Committee of the Palestine Exploration Fund.
- Dauphin, C. (1998). La Palestine byzantine, Peuplement et Populations. BAR International Series 726 (in French). Vol. III : Catalogue. Oxford: Archeopress. ISBN 0-860549-05-4.
- Government of Palestine, Department of Statistics (1945). Village Statistics, April, 1945.
- Guérin, V. (1880). Description Géographique Historique et Archéologique de la Palestine (in French). Vol. 3: Galilee, pt. 1. Paris: L'Imprimerie Nationale.
- Hadawi, S. (1970). Village Statistics of 1945: A Classification of Land and Area ownership in Palestine. Palestine Liberation Organization Research Center.
- Hütteroth, W.-D.; Abdulfattah, K. (1977). Historical Geography of Palestine, Transjordan and Southern Syria in the Late 16th Century. Erlanger Geographische Arbeiten, Sonderband 5. Erlangen, Germany: Vorstand der Fränkischen Geographischen Gesellschaft. ISBN 3-920405-41-2.
- Karmon, Y. (1960). "An Analysis of Jacotin's Map of Palestine" (PDF). Israel Exploration Journal. 10 (3, 4): 155–173, 244–253. Archived from the original (PDF) on 2019-12-22.
- Mills, E., ed. (1932). Census of Palestine 1931. Population of Villages, Towns and Administrative Areas. Jerusalem: Government of Palestine.
- Morris, B. (1987). The Birth of the Palestinian refugee problem, 1947-1949. Cambridge University Press. ISBN 0-521-33028-9.
- Palmer, E.H. (1881). The Survey of Western Palestine: Arabic and English Name Lists Collected During the Survey by Lieutenants Conder and Kitchener, R. E. Transliterated and Explained by E.H. Palmer. Committee of the Palestine Exploration Fund.
- Rhode, H. (1979). Administration and Population of the Sancak of Safed in the Sixteenth Century. Columbia University. Archived from the original on 2020-03-01.
- Robinson, E.; Smith, E. (1841). Biblical Researches in Palestine, Mount Sinai and Arabia Petraea: A Journal of Travels in the year 1838. Vol. 3. Boston: Crocker & Brewster.
- Schumacher, G. (1888). "Population list of the Liwa of Akka". Quarterly Statement - Palestine Exploration Fund. 20: 169–191.
- Shemer, Maayan (2016-10-06). "Yafi'a Final report" (128). Hadashot Arkheologiyot – Excavations and Surveys in Israel.
- Zidan, Omar (2015-12-06). "Yafi'a Final report" (127). Hadashot Arkheologiyot – Excavations and Surveys in Israel.
