= Iman Khatib-Yassin =

Israeli politician (born 1964)

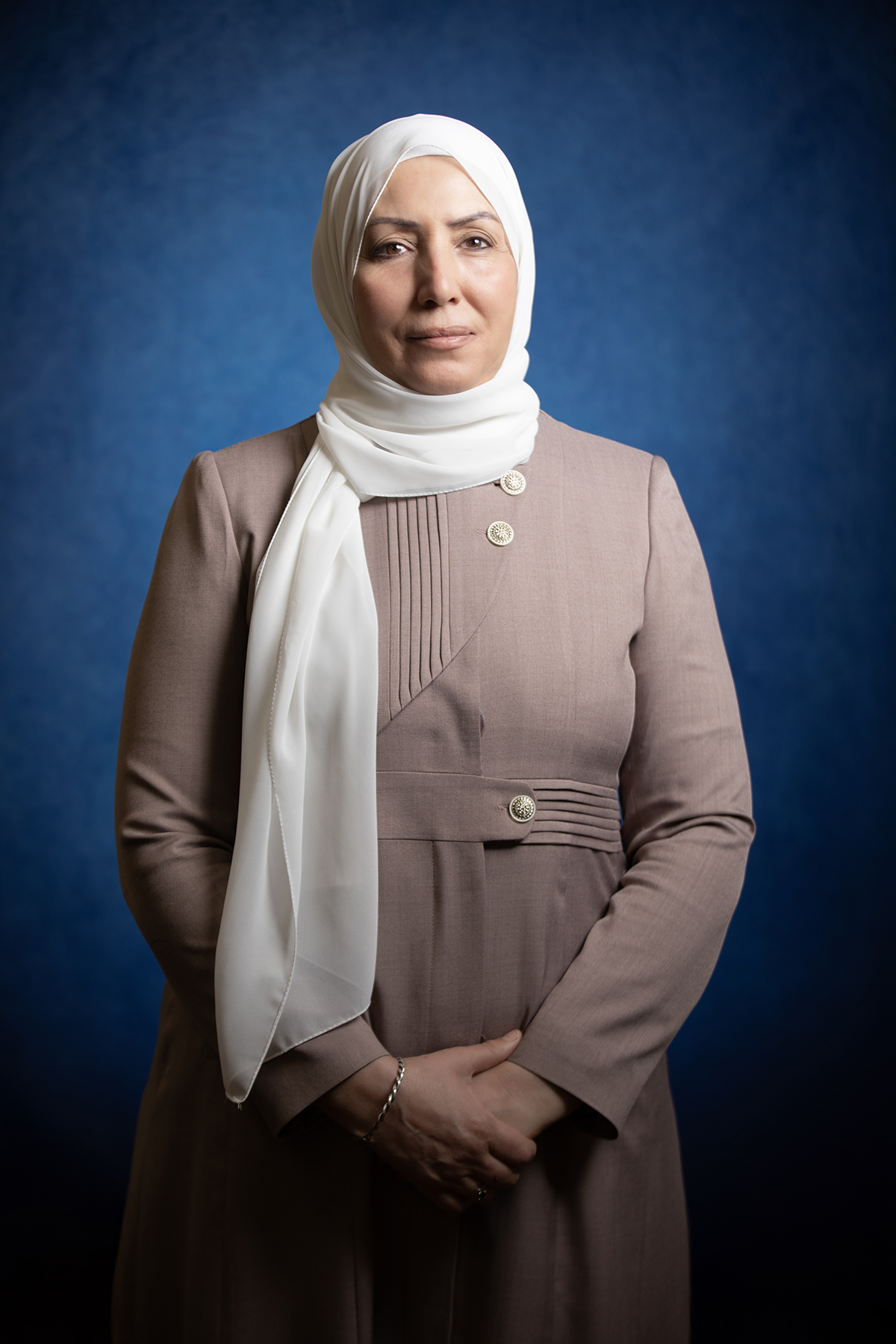
- Khatib-Yassin in 2024

Faction represented in the Knesset
- 2020–2021: Joint List
- 2021–: Ra'am

Personal details
- Born: 23 October 1964 (age 62) Arraba, Israel

Iman Khatib-Yassin (Arabic: إيمان خطيب ياسين, Hebrew: אימאן חטיב-יאסין; born 23 October 1964) is an Israeli Arab social worker and politician who currently serves as a member of the Knesset for Ra'am. She was first elected to the Knesset in 2020 as a member of the Joint List, becoming the first woman from Ra'am and the first hijab-wearing woman elected to the Knesset.

== Biography ==
Born in Arraba in 1964, Khatib-Yassin studied for a bachelor's degree in social work at the University of Haifa and a master's degree in women's affairs at Tel Aviv University. She also graduated from the Mandel College for Leadership. She was employed as a social worker, and ran a community centre in Yafa an-Naseriyye.

A member of the Southern Branch of the Islamic Movement and its political wing, Ra'am, Khatib-Yassin was placed ninth on the Ra'am–Balad list for the April 2019 elections, but the alliance won only four seats. Prior to the September 2019 elections, Ra'am joined the Joint List alliance, with Khatib-Yassin given the fifteenth slot on the list. However, the Joint List won thirteen seats. She was given fifteenth place again for the March 2020 elections and was elected to the Knesset as the alliance won fifteen seats. In the 2021 Israeli legislative election she was fifth on the Ra'am list, but the list won only four seats. However, she returned to the Knesset in August 2021 after the death of one of the party's MKs, Said al-Harumi. She was re-elected in the 2022 legislative election.

On 5 November 2023 Khatib-Yassin said that the attackers of the 7 October Hamas-led attack "didn't slaughter babies and they didn't rape women, at least not in the footage" of a 43-minute video made by the Israeli Defense Forces and shown to members of the Knesset, but "If [such actions] happened, it’s shameful". Her remarks prompted Ra'am leader Mansour Abbas to call on Khatib-Yassin to resign from the Knesset. Later the same day, Khatib-Yassin apologised, saying "I had no intention to belittle or deny the shocking massacre on October 7th and the terrible acts against women, babies, and the elderly who were murdered in the South." The Ethics Committee of the Knesset then suspended Khatib-Yassin for a month for having "denied atrocities".

== Personal life ==
Khatib-Yassin lives in Yafa an-Naseriyye in the Lower Galilee and has four children.
