= Jewish migration from Lebanon post-1948 =

20th-century population movement event

Lebanese Jewish Migration to Israel included thousands of Jews, who moved to Israel, similar to how 1948 witnessed the emigration of hundreds of thousands of Jews from Arab countries. Yet, "unlike Jewish communities in many other Arab states, the Jewish communities in Lebanon grew after 1948 and it was not until the end of the civil war of 1975 that the community started to emigrate." This "Lebanese difference" derives from two components: more positive Lebanese relationships with European authorities during the French Mandate than experienced by other Arab states, leading to a more pluralistic outlook in Lebanon than its neighbors; some elements in the Maronite Christian community who were tolerant of Zionism.

== Background ==
=== Mandatory rule ===
Tudor Parfitt writes, "the riots, which would have been quite inconceivable a short time before, were the first serious indication of dissatisfaction with British rule in the history of the colony". Looking at a few examples such as Aden, Libya, and Iraq it is clear that distaste for colonial rule and resentment over the Zionist movement resounded within Muslim communities in the Arab world. These sentiments led to several acts of violence against Jews throughout the Arab world. What resulted was fear and distrust within Jewish communities, prompting the emigration of hundreds of thousands to Israel. "There is little doubt however that the riots, separated from the mass immigration by about four years, were a central factor in bringing it about". In 1949 alone Israel witnessed an immigration of nearly two hundred and thirty five thousand Jews. By 1954, the number of immigrants to Israel since the founding of the Jewish state reached 725,000 (half the population) broken down as such:

Iraq -125,000
Yemen and Aden- 49,000
Morocco/Tunisia- 90,000
Turkey - 35,000
Iran-27,000
-------------
Total-326,000

Like many other Arab states, the Lebanese experienced deep resentment for their new lack of autonomy. Yet, unlike many other Arab states, Lebanon did not experience the same levels of dissatisfaction with their European colonizers.

Jews have been present in Lebanon since biblical times, and have been a fundamental part of Lebanese society. "In the twelfth century…the Jews lived in the same area as the Druze with whom they traded and engaged in crafts. They were well integrated into their environment and the majority of them were Arabised". Yet this Arabization should not be misconstrued as assimilation. Lebanese Jews did not assimilate into Muslim culture, but rather integrated. Here a distinction between assimilation and integration must be made. As it is to be used here assimilation deals with the adopting of a majority of another culture’s customs. Integration instead describes the relationship of two individual groups that come together yet maintain their individuality. Though a fundamental part of Lebanese society, the Jews of Lebanon retained their religious and cultural identity. One key way in which Lebanese Jews were able to maintain this cultural identity was through the Lebanese Constitution. Under the French Mandate, the French helped Lebanon to create a constitution, which "inaugurated the new and heterogeneous State". Lebanon thus created a country of integration rather than assimilation, one in which various cultures and religions were respected. "The rights of the Lebanese Jewish community were recognized in a civil constitution of 1911. This made them one of the more progressive minorities". What is more is that the governments did not simply state or write that they would respect minorities, but also did so in practice. In an address to the French Mandate and Lebanese government officials Selim Harari stated:

We address the government of the Republic of Lebanon with feelings of profound gratitude…for safeguarding our rights and interests as a religious minority; we are loyal and sincere citizens.

=== Zionism in Lebanon ===
In the case of Lebanon, Zionism was never received by the Jewish population to an extent to warrant significant riots or anti-Jewish violence. In a letter to Colonel Frederick Kisch, the chairman of the Zionist Executive wrote that prior to 1929 all the Lebanese communities including the Jews "showed no interest in the Palestine question". Even after the riots of 1929, though Jewish interest in Palestine increased it did so only slightly. Instead of seeing themselves as Jews, Lebanese Jews primarily saw themselves as Lebanese citizens. Even Joseph Farhi, who identified himself as a Lebanese Zionist, had the motto "to be both a good Jew and a good Lebanese citizen". Amongst the Lebanese Jewry, Judaism was, as Kirsten Shulze writes, "regarded as a religion, not a nationality or an ideology". Lebanese Jew’s national identity proved much stronger than their willingness to support the cause of Zionism, or at least their willingness to emigrate. Yet, this fact, this idea of a reluctance of Jews to leave their homes was not unique to Lebanon. In fact many Jews of Arab countries felt strong senses of nationalism toward their home countries and had lived with their Muslim and Christian brethren peacefully for centuries. What made Lebanon unique was the fact that the Lebanese government understood Lebanese Jews to be anti-Zionist and effectively protected them from anti-Jewish violence.

==== Zionism and the Lebanese Maronite Christian Community ====
Zionists perceived Lebanon as a unique state in the Arab world. Laura Eisenberg attests this uniqueness to the large Maronite Catholic community in Lebanon. What this Maronite community afforded Lebanese Jews was a common minority, or rather what the Lebanese Jewish community afforded the Maronites was a common minority in the Arab world. The Maronites sought to create an ‘alliance of minorities’ against the Muslim majority. The Maronites found this ally in the Zionists. In discussion of this Schulze writes, "a pro-Zionist approach by segments of the Maronite community (arose) who sought an alliance with Jewish Palestine to avert ‘the danger of Islam’." Furthermore, Eisenberg discusses the Maronite saying "After Saturday, Sunday," a proverb meant to communicate the idea "that once the Muslims do away with the Jews, they will turn on the Christians". In other words, the Maronite Catholics found a strong ally in the Zionists against the threat of Islam. Similarly the Zionist sought to make in roads within the Arab states, and found Lebanon, with its Maronite community, a perfect place to begin Arab relations. "In fact, the Maronite Catholic community in Lebanon and the pre-state Jewish community in Palestine maintained intensive, decades-long relationship alternately characterized by quiet periods of pleasant exchanges and fitful attempts to produce a politically effective alliance". Thus from the beginnings of Zionism, a positive relationship had already been established with the Lebanese Maronite community.

This positive relationship between the Zionist and Maronite community soon spread to the Lebanese government as a whole as the presidency in Lebanon went to the Maronites. Furthermore, during this time there existed a strong Maronite community in Lebanon. In fact according to the 1932 census Maronites were the majority religious group in Lebanon. Therefore, with a strong Maronite community and Maronites in key government positions, the strong Maronite-Zionist relationship became a strong Lebanese-Zionist relationship. Thus as other Arab countries saw Zionism as a threat to their nations and wrongfully accused Jews of being Zionists, and in turn attacking Jews themselves, Lebanon had a well established, peaceful relationship with Zionism. This peaceful and understanding relationship, derived from decades of work together, allowed for the Lebanese government to understand Zionism and react accordingly, while many other Arab states who had not cultivated such a relationship saw Zionism as a threat.

=== Violence in Arab Countries ===
As the Zionist movement grew in strength, so did anti-Jewish sentiments in Arab countries. Tudor Parfitt describes the situation in Aden writing,

"Arab concern with the problem of Palestine had been transformed into a deep local resentment of Jews by a number of factors. A certain unaccustomed assertiveness on the part of the Jewish community in Aden, the fact that the Jews hoisted Zionist flags on V.E. day and of course the very visible flow of Jewish refugees into Aden from the Yemen bound for Palestine combined to create an entirely new atmosphere".

Traditionally Jews and Muslims coexisted in relative peace in Aden, but now Aden became a place of increasing tensions, culminating in several riots. Fears over the partitioning of Palestine into a Jewish and Arab state led to small Arab strikes in October 1947 in Aden. Similarly, on 30 November, tensions arising from anti-Zionist sentiments culminated in violence throughout the Middle East. "After the United Nations proposal to partition Palestine, on November 30th, passions boiled over throughout the Arab world and Jewish blood was shed in Palestine, Damascus, Aleppo, Beirut and Baghdad". Leading up to and even after the creation of Israel in 1948, anti-Jewish violence spread throughout the Arab world.

Riots in Tripoli, Libya on 4 November 1945 followed the pattern of the riots in Aden. "The rioting, which involved shop looting, arson, and physical attacks, grew in intensity". Accounts of various informants during the riots describe "mostly poorer Muslims of all ages participated in the riots, while wealthier notables stood by and watched. Women also took part by cheering on the rioters with high-shrilled cries". Like Aden and Tripoli, Libya: Iraq, Syria, Morocco, and Egypt simply to name a few, experienced anti-Jewish violence. Not only did this violence occur as a reaction to the rise of Zionism and the state of Israel, but also as a symbol of dissatisfaction with foreign rule.

=== Emigration from Middle Eastern countries other than Lebanon ===
From 1948-1975, Israel experienced an immigration of 1,570,000 Jews. Of these, 751,000 came from Islamic countries, nearly 48% of all emigrating Jews. By 1954, of the 725,000 Jewish emigrants, 326,000 came from Muslim countries including Iraq, Yemen, Iran, and Aden. It seems that Arab-Jewish tension over the creation of Israel created inhospitable conditions for Middle Eastern Jews, including anti-Jewish riots, bombings, and criminal charges. These conditions grew out of years of growing dissatisfaction with European colonization, and Zionism on the part of the Muslims within Arab countries.

"Throughout 1947 the Aden Commissioner of Police noted a steady deterioration in relations between Jews and Muslims which was marked by a growth in petty assaults on Jews…Arab concern with the problem of Palestine had been transformed into a deep local resentment of Jews." Muslims, who had lived with Jews for centuries began to become resentful of the Zionist ideology. Muslims viewed Zionism as a betrayal of the sense of community that had grown between the cohabitants. Haim Saadoun in referencing an article written by Mohammed Kholti in 1934 writes, "they (the Jews) had betrayed the Muslims because their loyalty should have been to the Sherifian Empire whose hospitality had been well known from centuries." Many Jews were labeled as Zionists, and as Muslim distaste for Zionism grew, so did Muslims dislike of Jews as a whole. This resentment grew into violence, forcing many Jews to emigrate.

== Civil war and anti-Jewish violence in Lebanon ==
Shulze writes that while anti-Jewish violence was not unheard of in Lebanon "in the context of overall Lebanese attitudes towards its Jewish citizens, Lebanon is far from an ‘anti-Semitic [sic]’ country". Instead, Shulze offers the few instances of anti-Jewish violence as evidence for her claim. She writes, "The few anti-Jewish incidents merit a closer look, not because of the incidents themselves but because of the Lebanese reaction to them, in essence, was protective of Jews".

One incident of Jew-hatred in Lebanon occurred, like many other anti-Jewish incidents across the Arab world, during the Arab-Israeli wars. During this time Arab nationalists threatened violence against Lebanese Jews. As a result, the Lebanese government quickly launched military and paramilitary soldiers to the Jewish quarter, including many Muslim soldiers. Yet, what is most striking about this instance, and evidences the good Jewish-Muslim relationship within Lebanon, was a statement by Jewish community president Joseph Attieh. Attieh stated that the Jewish community "felt exactly as safe with either Muslim or Christian military and police forces".

A second incident occurred in 1975, and serves to further the idea of strong and positive Jewish-Muslim relations in Lebanon. In 1975 the Palestine Liberation Organization (PLO) and the Lebanese Nationalist Movement (LNM) made moves into Wadi Abu Jamil. During this occupation both groups supplied the Jews with food and water. What is more, the PLO stationed guards at the synagogue in order to prevent vandalism. As Shulze states, "Indeed while Lebanese Christians and Muslims were killing each other, Lebanese Jews maintained good relations with both sides".

It is thus evident that Lebanese sentiments as a whole were in favor of protecting the Lebanese Jewish population. The Lebanese community saw their Jewish population as an integral part of their community, they saw them as Lebanese citizens before Jews. It seems that much of this trust and comradery stemmed from favorable Lebanese-Zionist interactions, though Lebanese Jews were not prepared to immigrate to Israel. This favorable relationship with Zionism did not exist within many Arab countries and resulted in the anti-Jewish riots.

Nevertheless, Jews were targeted in the later years of the civil war. Isaac Sasson, a leader of the Lebanese Jewish community, who was kidnapped at gunpoint 31 March 1985, on his way from the Beirut International Airport, after a trip to Abu Dhabi. Earlier, kidnappers had also seized Eli Hallak, 60-year-old physician; Haim Cohen, a 39-year-old Jew; Isaac Tarrab; Yeheda Benesti; Salim Jammous; and Elie Srour. Cohen, Tarrab, and Srour were killed by their captors, a Shiite Muslim group called The Organization of the Oppressed on Earth, which is believed to have been part of or had links to Hezbollah. The others' fates remain unknown, but they are believed to have also been killed.

== See also ==
- History of the Jews in Lebanon
- Israel–Lebanon relations
- Lebanese people in Israel
