= Waleed Alhwashla =

Israeli politician

- وليد خليل الهواشلة
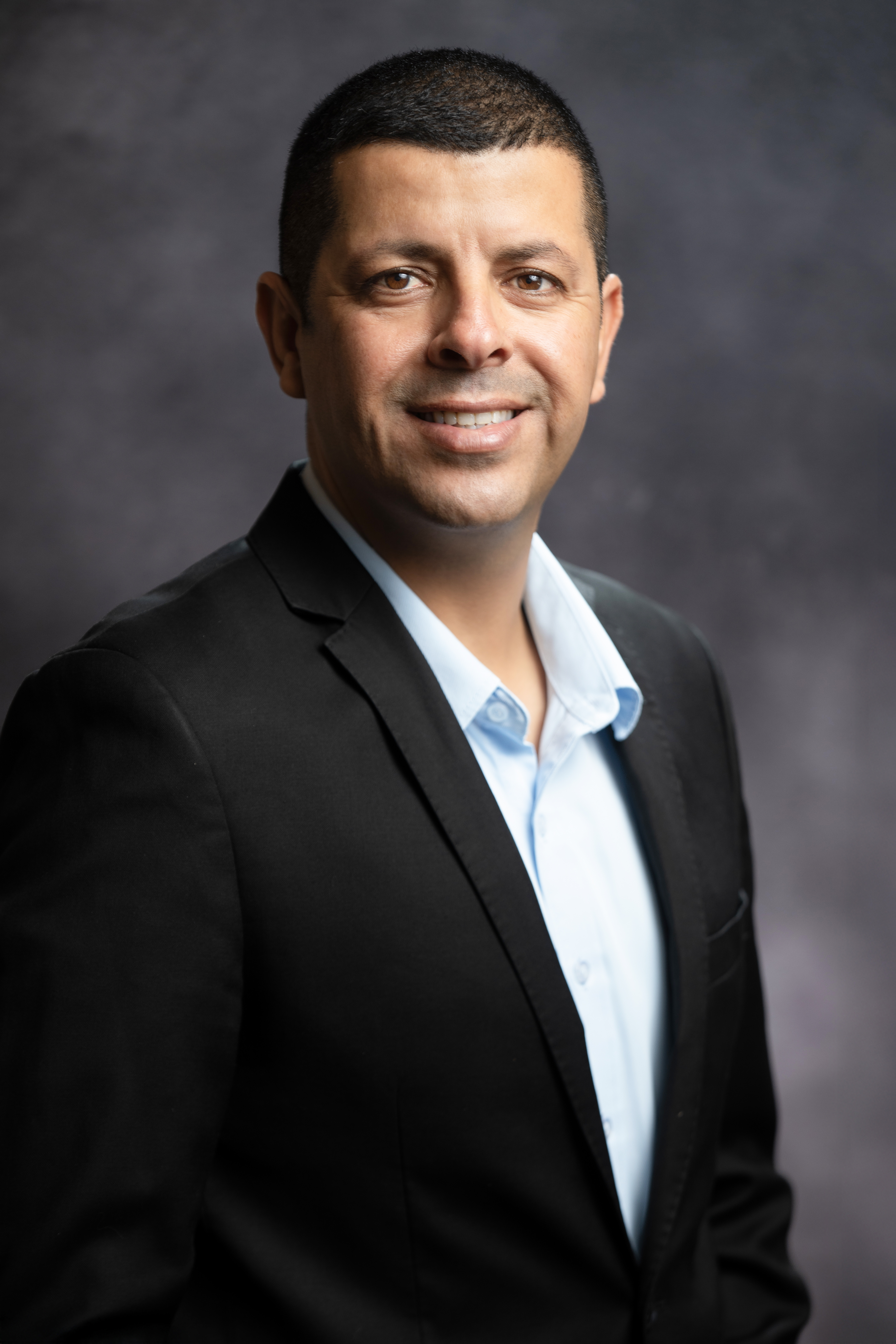

Faction represented in the Knesset
- 2022–: Ra'am

Personal details
- Born: 11 October 1981 (age 45)

Waleed Khalil Alhwashla (Arabic: وليد خليل الهواشلة; Hebrew: וליד אל-הואשלה; born 11 October 1981) is an Arab Israeli politician who was elected to the Knesset for Ra'am in the 2022 elections.

Born in the Bedouin town of Sa'wa in the Negev, east of Beersheba, Alhwashla holds a bachelor’s degree in Middle Eastern studies and a master’s degree in political science from the University of Haifa. Between 2000 and 2013, he served as a football referee within the Israel Football Association, including in the top divisions.

== Political career ==
He was placed in the third slot of the electoral list of Ra'am following primaries that were held in August 2022.

Alhwashla, as a member of the State Control Committee, voted in October 2025 in favor of creating a commission of inquiry on the 7 October attacks, though it was voted down.

== See also ==
- List of members of the twenty-fifth Knesset
