= Arameans in Israel =

Christian minority in Israel

Total population
- 16-4,500 (Note: According to interviewees in the article.)

Regions with significant populations
- Nazareth, Jish

Languages
- Modern Hebrew Levantine Arabic (historically South) Classical Syriac (Language revitalization) Western Neo-Aramaic

Religion
- Syriac Christianity (Maronite Church, Syriac Catholic Church, Syriac Orthodox Church)

Arameans in Israel (Hebrew: ארמים בישראל) are a Christian minority residing in Israel. They claim to descend from the Arameans, an ancient Semitic-speaking people in the Middle East in the 1st millennium BC.

Some Syriac Christians in the Middle East espouse an Aramean ethnic identity, and a minority still speak various Neo-Aramaic languages, with the Eastern branch being widely spoken. Until 2014, self-identified Arameans in Israel were registered as ethnic Arabs or without an ethnic identity. Since September 2014, Aramean has become a valid identity on the Israeli population census, making Israel the first country in the world to officially recognize Arameans as a modern community. Christian families or clans who can speak Aramaic and/or have an Aramaic family tradition are eligible to register on the census as ethnic Arameans in Israel.

As of 2017, 16 people had registered as Aramean in the Population Registry. According to interviewees in a 2022 article in Middle Eastern Studies, 2,500 Israelis had registered as Arameans at the Israeli Ministry of Interior, whereas another 2,000 have applied for changing their national denomination from Arab to Aramean. These 4,500 people would constitute c. 1.5% of Israel's Christian population.

== History ==
=== Legal recognition in Israel ===
In September 2014, Minister of the Interior Gideon Sa'ar instructed the PIBA to recognise Arameans as an ethnicity separate from Israeli Arabs. Under the Ministry of the Interior's guidance, people born into Christian families or clans who have either Aramaic or Maronite cultural heritage within their family are eligible to register as Arameans. About 200 Christian families were thought to be eligible prior to this decision. According to an August 9, 2013 Israel Hayom article, at that time an estimated 10,500 persons were eligible to receive Aramean ethnic status according to the new regulation, including 10,000 Maronites (which included 2,000 former SLA members) and 500 Syriac Catholics.

The first person to officially receive the "Aramean" ethnic status in Israel was 2 year old Yaakov Halul in Jish on 20 October 2014.

In 2019, an Israeli court ruled that Aramean minorities could choose a Jewish or Arab education, rather than requiring children with Aramean identity to be automatically enrolled in Arabic-language schools.

==== Reactions ====
The recognition of the Aramean ethnicity caused mixed reactions among Israeli minorities, the Christian community, and among the general Arab Israeli population. Representatives of the Greek Orthodox Patriarchate of Jerusalem denounced the move.

Mordechai Kedar advocates the recognition of the Aramean identity and calls on the government of Israel to promote the awareness regarding this issue on the basis of the international principle of ethnic self-determination as espoused by Wilson's 14 points. One of the supporters of the recognition of the Aramean identity is Gabriel Naddaf, who is a priest to the Greek Orthodox Christians in Israel. He advocated on behalf of his Aramean followers and thanked the Interior Ministry's decision as a "historic move".

== Demographics ==
In July 2016, an article in the Ha'aretz estimated the number of Israeli Christians eligible to register as Arameans in Israel to be 13,000. In October 2019, the Israeli Christian Aramaic Organization estimated the number of Israeli citizens, who are eligible to obtain Aramean affiliation at 15,000.

As of 2017, 16 people had registered as Aramean in the Population Registry.

According to interviewees in a 2022 article in Middle Eastern Studies, 2,500 Israelis have registered as Arameans at the Israeli Ministry of Interior, whereas another 2,000 have applied for changing their national denomination from Arab to Aramean. These 4,500 people would constitute c. 1,5% of Israel's Christian population.

== See also ==
- Christianity in Israel
- Assyrians in Israel
- Maronites in Israel
- Arameans

== Bibliography ==
- Hasegawa, Shuichi (2012). Aram and Israel during the Jehuite Dynasty. Berlin-Boston: Walter de Gruyter. ISBN 9783110283488.
- Lemaire, André (2019). "The Boundary between the Aramaean Kingdom of Damascus and the Kingdom of Israel". Aramaean Borders: Defining Aramaean Territories in the 10th–8th Centuries B.C.E. Leiden-Boston: Brill. pp. 245–266. ISBN 9789004398535.
- Levin, Yigal (2017). "My Father was a Wandering Aramean: Biblical Views of the Ancestral Relationship between Israel and Aram". Wandering Arameans: Arameans Outside Syria: Textual and Archaeological Perspectives. Wiesbaden: Harrassowitz Verlag. pp. 39–52. doi:10.2307/J.CTVCKQ4PM.8.
- Lipiński, Edward (2000). The Aramaeans: Their Ancient History, Culture, Religion. Leuven: Peeters Publishers. ISBN 9789042908598.
- Mazar, Benjamin (1962). "The Aramean Empire and Its Relations with Israel". The Biblical Archaeologist. 25 (4): 97–120. doi:10.2307/3210938. JSTOR 3210938. S2CID 165844359.
- Weissblei, Eti (2017). "Arameans in the Middle East and Israel: Historical Background, Modern National Identity, and Government Policy" (PDF).
- Zwickel, Wolfgang (2019). "Borders between Aram-Damascus and Israel: A Historical Investigation". Aramaean Borders: Defining Aramaean Territories in the 10th–8th Centuries B.C.E. Leiden-Boston: Brill. pp. 267–335. ISBN 9789004398535.
- * Ferrand, Antoinette. La diaspora syriaque-orthodoxe de Jérusalem (1831-1948) : Pèlerins, réfugiés et fabrique communautaire à l'époque ottomane et mandataire. EHESS.
