= Gabriel Naddaf =

Israeli Greek Orthodox priest and judge

- جبرائيل ندّاف
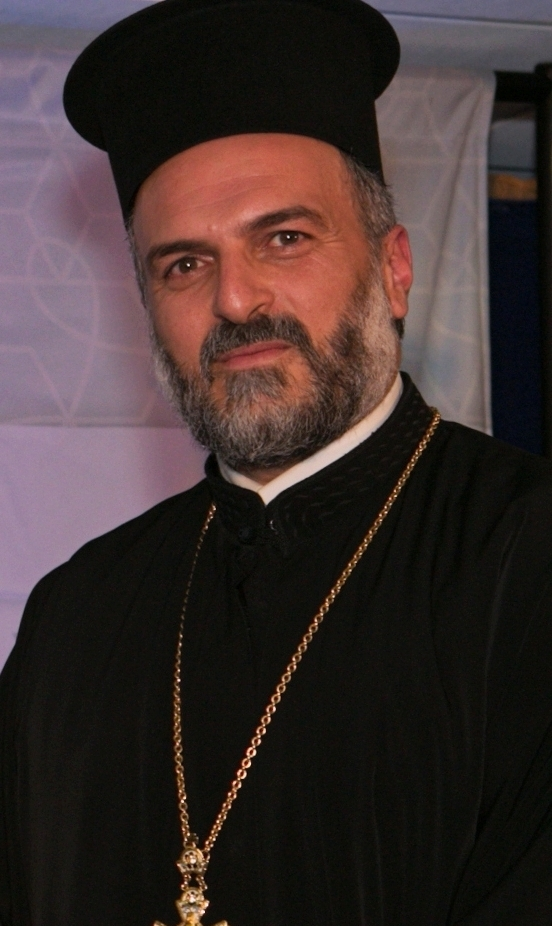
- Born: 18 August 1973 (age 53); Yafa an-Naseriyye, Israel
- Occupations: Priest; Spokesman of the Orthodox Church of Jerusalem
- Children: 2

Gabriel Naddaf (Arabic: جبرائيل ندّاف, Hebrew: גבריאל נדאף; born 18 August 1973) is an Israeli dismissed Greek Orthodox priest. He serves as a judge in Israel's religious court system and as a spokesman for the Greek Orthodox Patriarchate of Jerusalem. He is one of the founders of the Forum for recruiting Christians in the Israel Defense Forces.

Naddaf supports the integration of Christian Arabs in all state institutions, including military and national service. He has been threatened by Israeli Arabs, including politicians. His oldest son, Jubran, was physically attacked in December 2013 for supporting his father's activities. Naddaf has received the support of Israeli Prime Minister Benjamin Netanyahu, the Israeli Ministry of Defense, members of the Knesset, and other officials.

In 2016, Naddaf was selected to light a torch at the Israel Independence Day ceremony on Mount Herzl.

== Biography ==
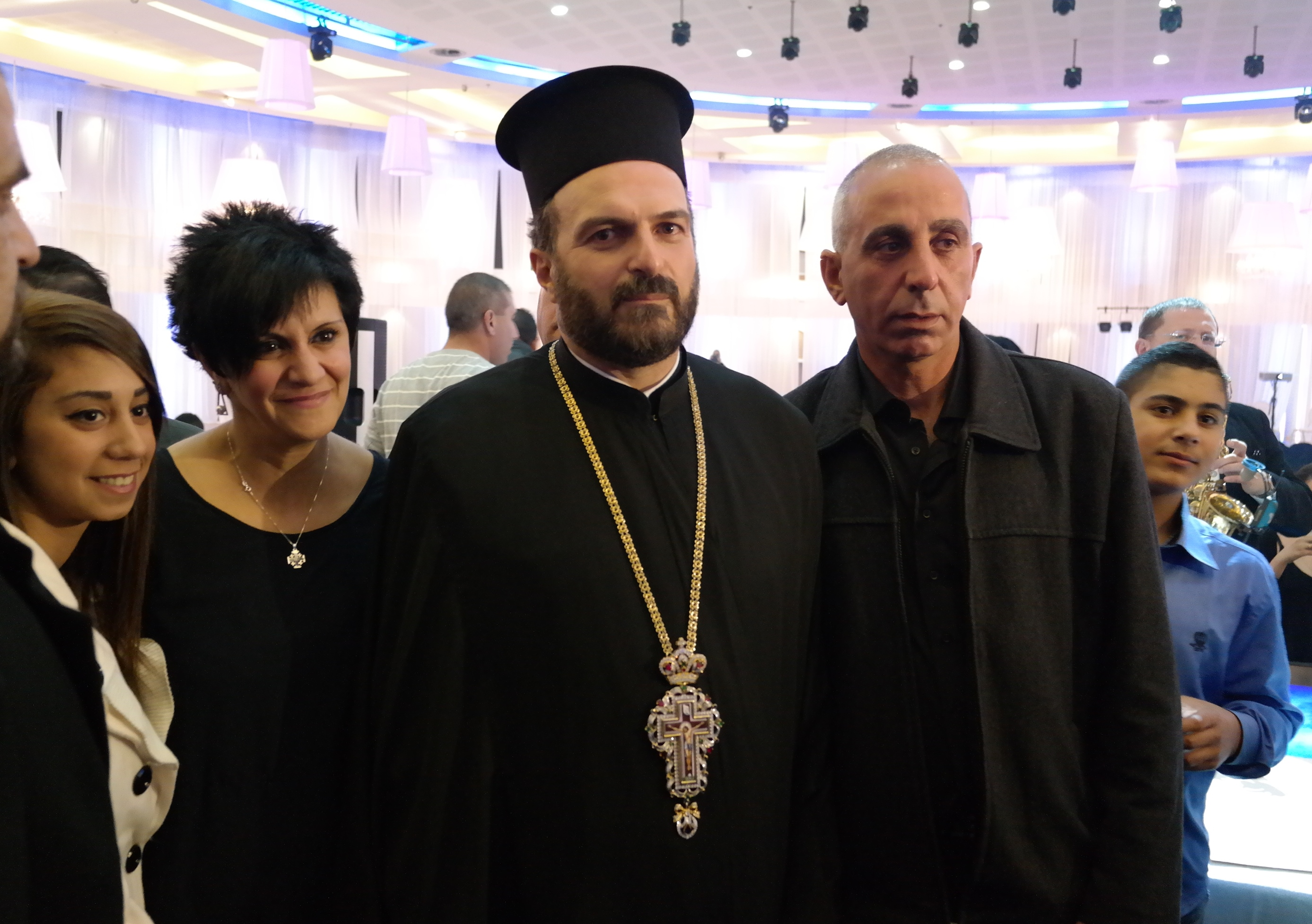
Gabriel Naddaf in 2014

Gabriel Naddaf was born in Yafa an-Naseriyye (Yafia), an Arab Muslim village with a large Christian minority in the Nazareth metropolitan area. Since 1995, Naddaf has served as a priest in the Church of the Annunciation in Nazareth, and as a priest of the Greek Orthodox monastery in Nazareth, which belongs to the Greek Orthodox Patriarchate of Jerusalem, and is the Christian denomination with the largest affiliation in Israel. He served as a spokesman for the Patriarchate and as a judge in the religious courts of the church.

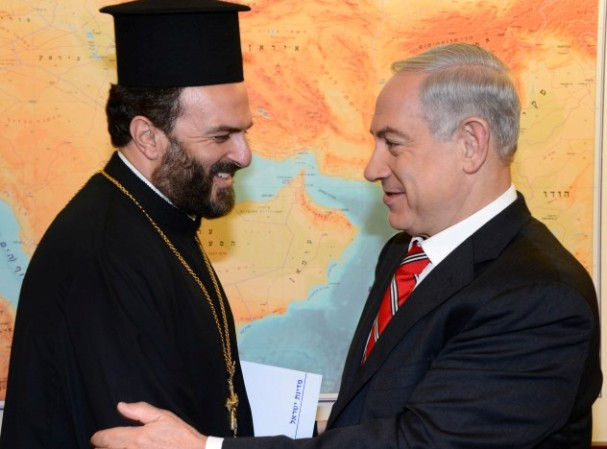
Father Naddaf with Prime Minister of Israel Benjamin Netanyahu

In 2005, he became known to the general public for the first time, when he and another priest, Fr. Romanos Radwan, petitioned an Israeli court to prevent the overthrow of Patriarch Irenaios I. The attempts failed and Theophilus III, regarded as hostile towards Israel, was elected.

Naddaf is married and has two children.

== Public activism ==
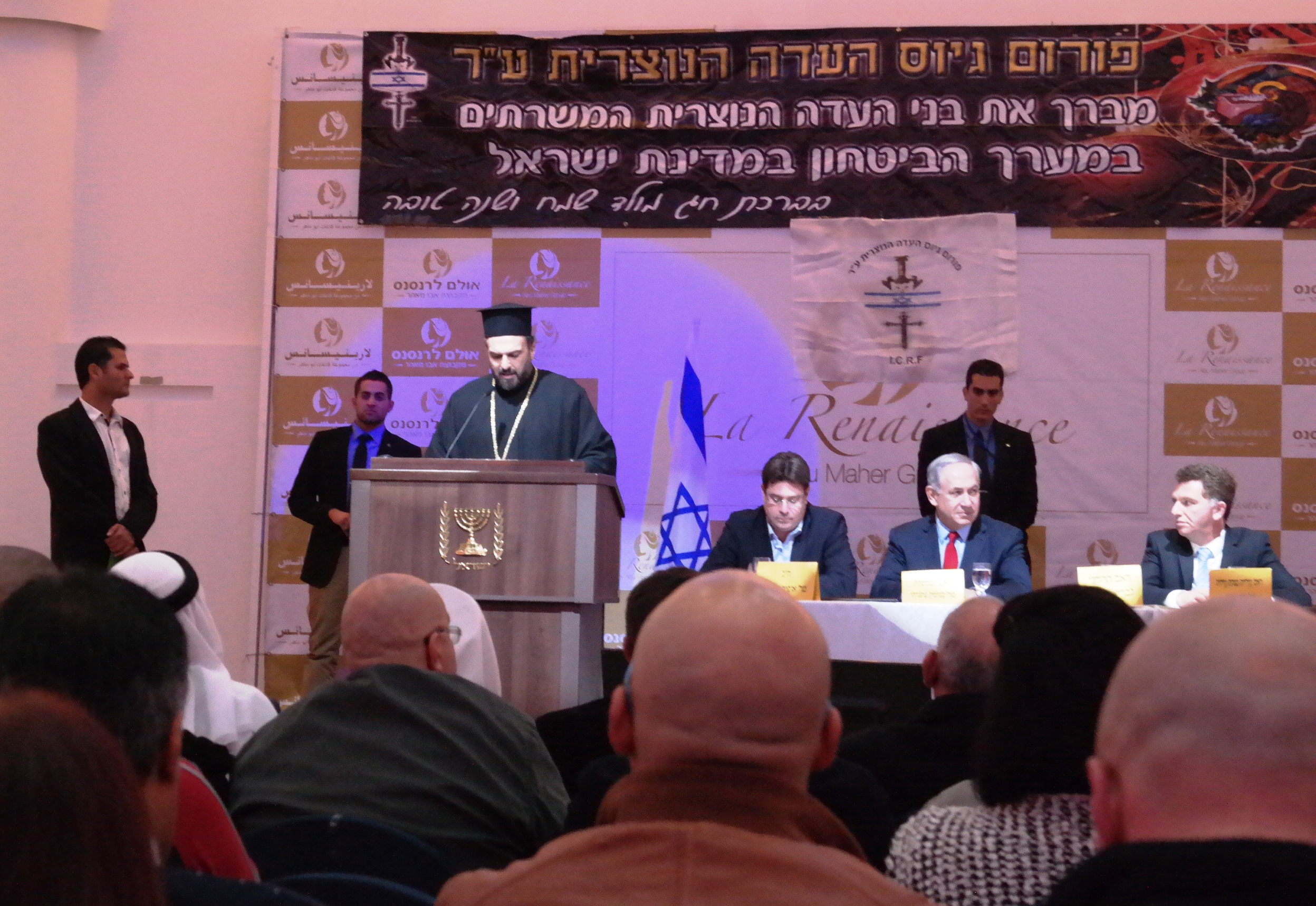
Gabriel Naddaf addressing Christian IDF soldiers, December 2014

=== Christian Arab military service ===
Naddaf believes that the Christian community should integrate more into mainstream Israeli society. He is in favor of recruiting Arabic-speaking Christians in the army, police and for sherut leumi (national service): "Why do the Druze serve? Why do the Bedouin serve? But not the Christians?" Naddaf asked during a Times of Israel interview. "Because they are scared." And that, he suggested, had to change. "It is time to say in a loud and clear voice: enough."

On 16 October 2012, a conference was held in Nazareth, designed to encourage recruitment of young Christians into the army and for national service. The conference was organized by the Ministry of Defense and the Municipality of Nazareth, at the request of the Christian Community mobilization Forum and its spiritual leader, Father Naddaf. The conference was attended by 121 young Arab Christians and some Muslims, Bedouins, and Druze, who expressed a desire to join the Israel Defense Forces IDF.

The second conference was held and organized by Naddaf and the Christian IDF Forum in June 2013. It was reported that the rate of recruitment of young Christians in the IDF tripled between 2010 and 2013, although it is still a very small in absolute numbers. On August 5, 2013, the office of the Prime Minister reported that: "Last year there was an increase in the number of Christian IDF recruits, from 35 recruits a year ago to 100 this year, and 500 other young people from the community are doing national service."

On 1 May 2014, at a conference in Nazareth, attended by Deputy Defense Minister Danny Danon, it was reported that in 2013 the numbers of Arabic-speaking Christians IDF recruits continued to increase further, and was about 150 people, in addition to national service. It was reported that the number of IDF recruits in only the first quarter of 2014, up to and including March 2014 was around 100 people.

In September 2014, Naddaf addressed the United Nations Human Rights Council under the auspices of the "Face of Israel" advocacy group, where he called on the world to unite against Islamic extremism and to stop harassing Israel, since: "Israel is the only place in the Middle East where Christians are safe".

=== Recognition of the Arameans ===
Father Naddaf has pushed, along with Shadi Khalloul Risho, a major in the reserves and a spokesman for the Christian IDF Forum and Chairman of the Association of Christian Arameans, for the recognition of the Arabic-speaking Christians of Israel as a separate people, Aramean, as opposed to Arab or Palestinian. He said: "My two-year old son made history and Gideon Sa'ar made history and the Jewish people finally did justice with other nations in this region. We have been waiting for justice for thousands of years" upon registering his son at the Population Registry as "Aramean".

== Criticism ==
The mayor of the city of Nazareth and Chairman of the Association of Arab mayors, Ramiz Jaraisy –a Greek-Orthodox as well as Naddaf–, and MKs Mohammed Barakeh, Dov Khenin and Hana Sweid, a Greek-Catholic, all members of Hadash, have condemned the Christian IDF Forum and claim that Naddaf's actions are going "to cause a sectarian rift in Arab society." The Orthodox Christian Community Council have in the past attempted to boycott Naddaf and prevent his entry into the church compound in Nazareth on the grounds that the Christian Arabs should not divide Arab society in Israel. Naddaf could then enter his church with guards, Christian soldiers in the IDF and Border Police.

According to people around Naddaf, the leftist-Islamic coalition went on an aggressive slander against him in the Arab press, local and international, on social networks and YouTube. He was called: "Zionist agent, traitor, crazy, man running after money and recruiting young people into the army of occupation" on Arab sites and posted links to a Facebook page that displays a "black list" of priests, soldiers and security personnel from the Christian community who support and encourage young people to join the IDF. As a result, young recruits and soldiers from Nazareth had to ask their commanders to leave home in civilian clothes, for fear of bullying and harassment.

MK Haneen Zoabi (Balad) and MK Ahmed Tibi (United Arab List) have written open letters and talked and rallied against Naddaf.

Representatives from the Palestinian Authority paid a visit to the Greek Orthodox Patriarch in June 2013, following the second conference of recruits Christians IDF and national service and ordered him to fire Naddaf immediately, providing letters from a number of Arab MKs, including Haneen Zoabi, Muhammad Barakeh, and Basel Ghattas. According to MK Ghattas: "Patriarch should explain Naddaf that it's not his job. Please take off his cape and join the Likud or Yisrael Beiteinu. He wants to bring the Christian community to the status of the Druze community, and take it out of its national affiliation". In addition patriarch was sent letters on the matter from leaders of the Arab sector councils.

In mid-June 2013, the Patriarch Theophilus III published in the Israeli Arab media a severe condemnation of activities organized by Naddaf. A week later, he summoned him to have a personal conversation. It has been speculated that its original purpose was probably to fire him from his position. The meeting itself was held on June 25, 2013, and lasted for hours, but the counter-pressure exerted by the heads of the Israeli establishment, including Justice Minister Tzipi Livni, and Interior Minister Gideon Sa'ar, apparently persuaded the Patriarch not to fire Naddaf during that meeting.

On 6 May 2014, a spokesman for the Greek Orthodox Patriarchate, Father Issa Mesleh, published a statement that: "the Patriarch Theophilus III decided to revoke all the powers of the Father Naddaf at his church and oust him from his position as head of the Orthodox Church in Yafia"; within two weeks the spokesman turned out to be a speaker from the Palestinian Authority who published things on his own and that the Patriarchate did not reject the authority of Father Naddaf.

=== Sexual abuse allegations ===
In May 2016, Israeli television station Channel 2 reported accusations that Naddaf had sought sexual favours from male youth he had come into contact with through his IDF recruitment work. Channel 2 also claimed that Naddaf used his governmental contacts to arrange Israeli entry visas for Palestinians for illicit business purposes. Naddaf denied the claims. Following the airing, the Israel Police opened a criminal investigation against Naddaf for sexual assault and illicit favors. Following evidence of more purported victims of improper conduct and sexual harassment, the investigators turned the case to the State Attorney for possible prosecution.

In 2018, the Haifa district prosecutor's office closed the case due to lack of evidence and absence of criminal liability.

== Verbal and physical assault ==
At the beginning of December 2013, Naddaf filed a complaint, along with the movement Im Tirtzu with the Knesset Ethics Committee against MK Basel Ghattas (Balad), claiming that the MK: "exploits his immunity to incite against me and threaten me very intensely to make it easier for someone lacking all come and physically hurt me". Naddaf noted that in parallel, he filed another complaint on the same subject at the Nazareth police against MK Ghattas. On 6 December 2013, just days later, Naddaf's eldest son was attacked by a young Arab from Nazareth, who beat his head and body with an iron rod. According to Naddaf, "as I call to integrate our children in Israeli society, the extremists are trying to divide and tear and inciting against me. Incitement passed yesterday from verbal threats to physical violence, as their purpose is to intimidate me and my family. My wife is afraid to go out, and my second 15-year-old son refuses to go out, fearful that radical activists will also hurt him."

== Support ==
In November 2012, a month after the first conference of the Christian IDF Forum, the director of the National Civic Service, Sar-Shalom Gerbi, came to Nazareth: "to express his support to Naddaf for his steadfastness and unwavering support for encouraging young Christians to integrate into the community in Israel". Gerbi said at that meeting, that: "this is a courageous act, a man of letters, undeterred by threats and pressures and insists on serving the country... I hope that law enforcement authorities will act decisively to stop the campaign of incitement and de-legitimization of Naddaf and against the young men and women doing national service". About two weeks later, Gerbi met with the Greek Orthodox Patriarch Theophilus III, who promised him that Naddaf will not be boycotted by the Church.

In February 2013, MK Ayelet Shaked met with Naddaf; in June 2013, Justice Minister Tzipi Livni and Interior Minister Gideon Sa'ar met with him as did Deputy Defense Minister Danny Danon on July 2.

On 5 August 2013, Naddaf met with Prime Minister Benjamin Netanyahu, who directed the establishment of a joint forum with participation of the government and the Christian community which will promote the recruitment of members of the community to the IDF and national service, and their integration into national life. This forum should work to integrate the Christian community according to the Law of Equal Burden and oversee administrative and legal aspects necessary for this purpose, such as protecting the supporters of recruitment and recruits from violence and threats and increased enforcement of the law against rioters and those inciting violence. He added that: "we should allow for the Christian community to join the IDF. You are loyal citizens who want to defend the country and I salute you and support you. We will not tolerate threats to you and we will enforce the law firm hand against persecute you. I will not accept attempts to undermine the country from within. The State of Israel and the Israeli Prime Minister stand by your side." On December 14, 2014, at a ceremony organized by the Christian IDF forum in Nazareth Illit, Prime Minister Benjamin Netanyahu expressed his support of the Christian community of Israel, in the face of rising Islamic extremism in the Middle East, especially against Christians.

== See also ==
- Arameans in Israel
