= Maronite Church of the Annunciation =

Coordinates: 32.7072°N 35.2883°E

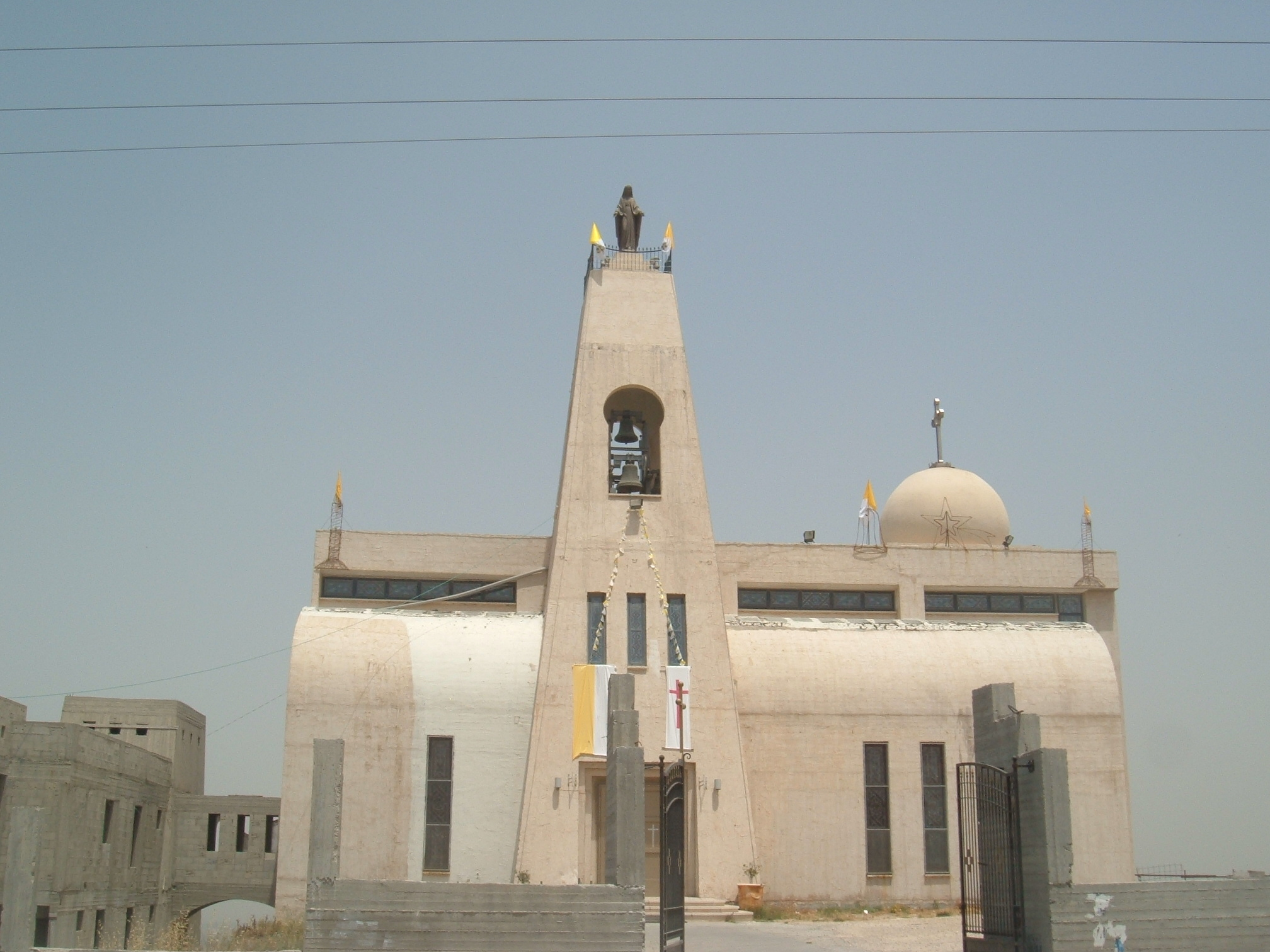
- Maronite Church of the Annunciation
- Location: Nazareth
- Country: Israel
- Denomination: Catholic (Maronite Church)

The Maronite Church of the Annunciation is a Maronite Catholic church that is located in the city of Nazareth, in northern Israel. It is dedicated to the Annunciation and should not be confused with the Roman Catholic Basilica of the Annunciation nor the Coptic Church of the Annunciation in the same city with the same name.

== Background ==
The Maronite Catholic community in Nazareth has existed since the year 1620. Today in Nazareth, there are about 1,200 Maronites.

== Church building ==
The Church of the Annunciation was built in the 21st century according to the latest architectural styles. The temple was built with reinforced concrete. The main dome is topped with an onion-shaped dome. To the side of the dome is a bell tower, on top of which stands a statue of the Virgin Mary. The interior is decorated with numerous sculptures and paintings by Italian painters Tese and Lamagna.

== See also ==
- Basilica of the Annunciation
- Coptic Church of the Annunciation

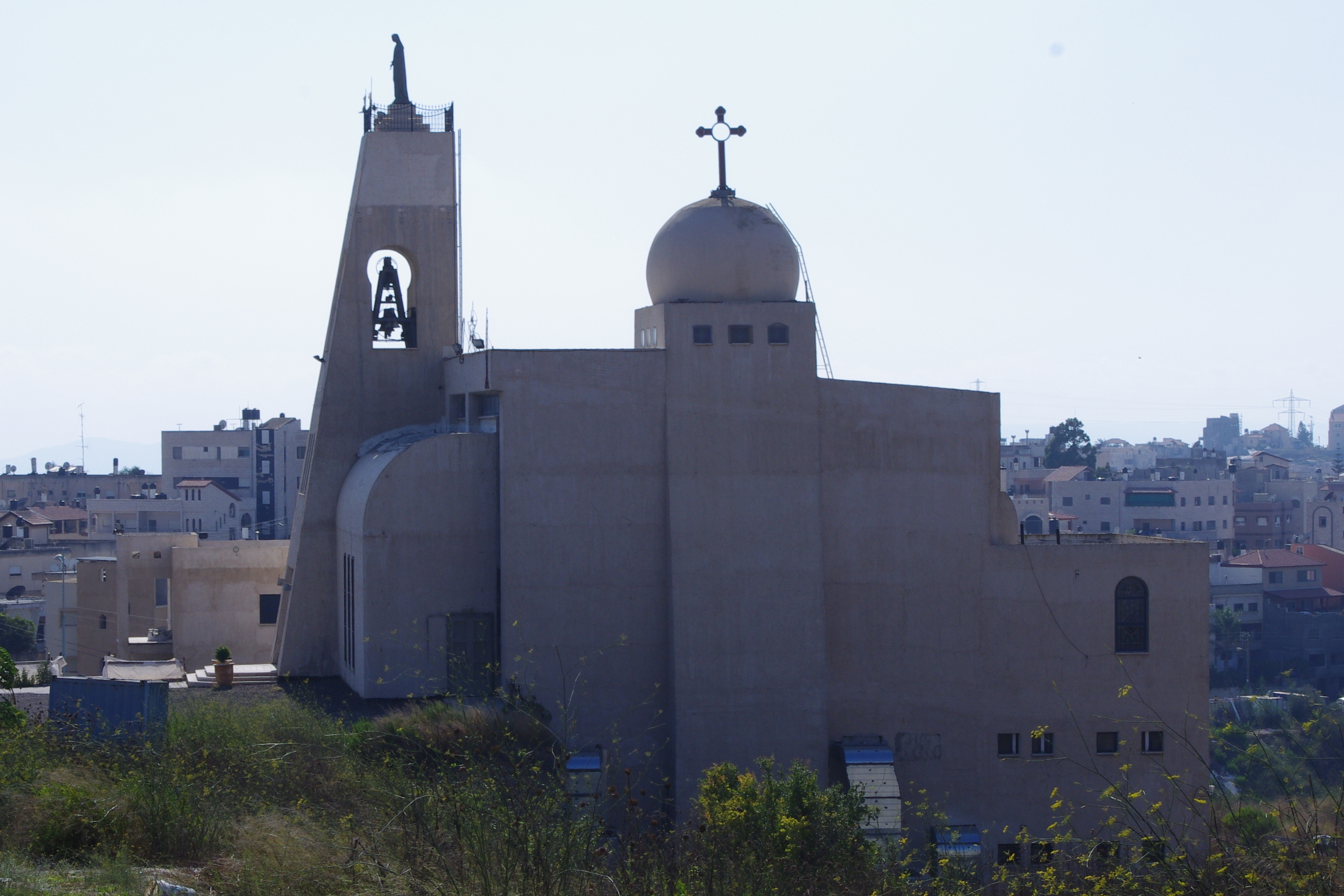
Another view of the temple
