= Christianity in Israel =

Israeli Christians المسيحيين الإسرائيليين נוצרים ישראלים
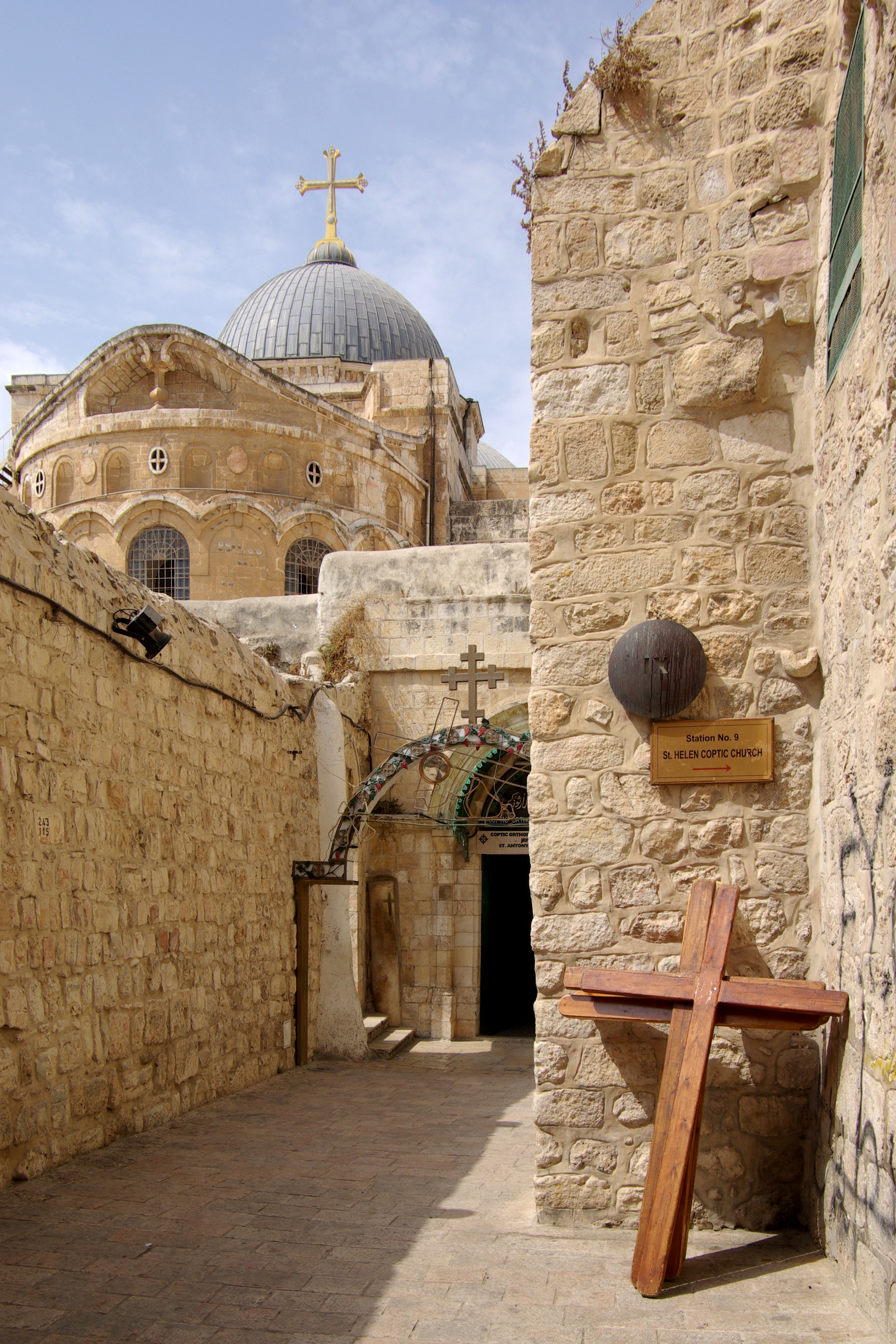
- The Church of the Holy Sepulchre in the Christian Quarter of Jerusalem

Total population
- ~185,000 (1.9% of the Israeli population) (2022 estimate)

Regions with significant populations
- Israel

Languages
- Arabic, English, Russian, French, Hebrew, Modern Aramaic

Christianity (Hebrew: נצרות, romanized: Natsrút; Arabic: المسيحية, romanized: al-Masīḥiyya; Imperial Aramaic: ܢܘܨܪܝܐ ܕܐܪܥܐ ܕܝܣܪܐܝܠ) is the third largest religion in Israel, after Judaism and Islam. At the end of 2022, Christians made up 1.9% of the Israeli population, numbering approximately 185,000. 75.8% of the Christians in Israel are Arab Christians. Christians make up 6.9% of the Arab-Israeli population.

Ten Christian churches are formally recognized under Israel's confessional system, for the self-regulation and state recognition of status issues, such as marriage and divorce: the Armenian Apostolic Church, the Armenian Catholic Church, the Chaldean Catholic Church, the Episcopal Church in Jerusalem and the Middle East, the Greek Orthodox Church, the Latin Catholic Church, the Melkite Greek Catholic Church, the Syriac Catholic Church, the Syriac Maronite Church, and the Syriac Orthodox Church. However, the practice of religion is free, with no restrictions on the practice of other denominations. Approximately 300 Christians have converted from Islam according to one 2014 estimate, and most of them are part of the Catholic Church. About 20,000 Israelis practice Messianic Judaism, usually considered a syncretist form of Christianity.

Arab Christians are mostly adherents of the Melkite Greek Catholic Church (60% of Arab Christians in Israel). Some 40% of all Israeli Christians are affiliated with the Melkite Greek Church, and some 30% with the Greek Orthodox Patriarchate of Jerusalem. Smaller numbers are split between the Latin Patriarchate of Jerusalem, with 13% of Christians, as well as an unknown number of Russian Orthodox Christians, about 13,000 Maronites and other Syriac Christians, 3,000 to 5,000 adherents of Armenian churches, a community of around 1,000 Coptic Christians, and small branches of Protestants.

Christians in Israel are historically connected with neighbouring Lebanese, Syrian, and Jordanian Christians. A number of Arab Christians in Israel identify as Palestinian Christians, reflecting shared heritage and ties with Christian communities in the West Bank, Gaza Strip, and East Jerusalem. They also maintain connections with Palestinian diaspora and refugee communities, many of whom trace their origins to similar towns and villages in historic Palestine. The cities and communities where most Christians in Israel reside are Haifa, Nazareth, Shefa-Amr, Jish, Mi'ilya, Fassuta and Kafr Yasif. The Christian communities in Israel run numerous schools, colleges, hospitals, clinics, orphanages, homes for the elderly, dormitories, family and youth centers, hotels, and guesthouses. The Christian community in Israel is one of the few growing Christian populations in the Middle East. Israeli Arab Christians generally have higher educational achievements and enjoy higher incomes than their Druze and Muslim counterparts. Although Arab Christians in Israel often report higher educational attainment and household income compared with other Arab groups, they also face social and economic challenges including employment discrimination, harassment of Christian institutions, significantly lower fertility rates, and concern about emigration among younger members.

== History ==
=== Early Christians and the Roman period ===
Early Christianity is generally reckoned by Church historians to begin with the ministry of Jesus (c. 27–30) and end with the First Council of Nicaea (325). It is typically divided into two periods: the Apostolic Age (c. 30–100, when the first apostles were still alive) and the Ante-Nicene Period (c. 100–325). Driven by a universalist logic, Christianity has been, from its beginnings, a missionary faith with global aspirations. It first spread through the Jewish diaspora along the trade and travel routes followed by merchants, soldiers, and migrating tribes. It achieved critical mass in the years between 150 and 250 when it moved from fewer than 50,000 adherents to over a million. This provided enough adopters for its growth rate to be self-sustaining.

==== Jewish–Hellenistic background ====
Christianity originated in 1st-century Judea from a sect of apocalyptic Jewish Christians within the realm of Second Temple Judaism. The basic tenets of the Jewish religion during this era were ethical monotheism and the Torah, or the Mosaic Law. In this period, the Second Temple of Jerusalem was still central to Judaism, but synagogues were also established as institutions for prayer and the reading of Jewish sacred texts. The Hebrew Bible developed during the Second Temple Period, as the Jews decided which religious texts were of divine origin; the Masoretic Text, compiled by the Jewish scribes and scholars of the Early Middle Ages, comprises the Hebrew and Aramaic 24 books that they considered authoritative.

The Hellenized Greek-speaking Jews of Alexandria produced a Greek translation of the Hebrew Bible called "the Septuagint", that included books later identified as the Apocrypha, while the Samaritans produced their own edition of the Torah, the Samaritan Pentateuch; according to the Dutch–Israeli biblical scholar and linguist Emanuel Tov, professor of Bible Studies at the Hebrew University of Jerusalem, both of these ancient editions of the Hebrew Bible differ significantly from the medieval Masoretic Text. Currently, all the main non-Protestant (Roman Catholic, Eastern Orthodox, and Oriental Orthodox) Christian denominations accept as canonical the Deuterocanonical books, which were excluded from the modern Hebrew Bible and the Protestant Bible. The Septuagint was influential on early Christianity as it was the Hellenistic Greek translation of the Hebrew Bible primarily used by the 1st-century Christian authors.

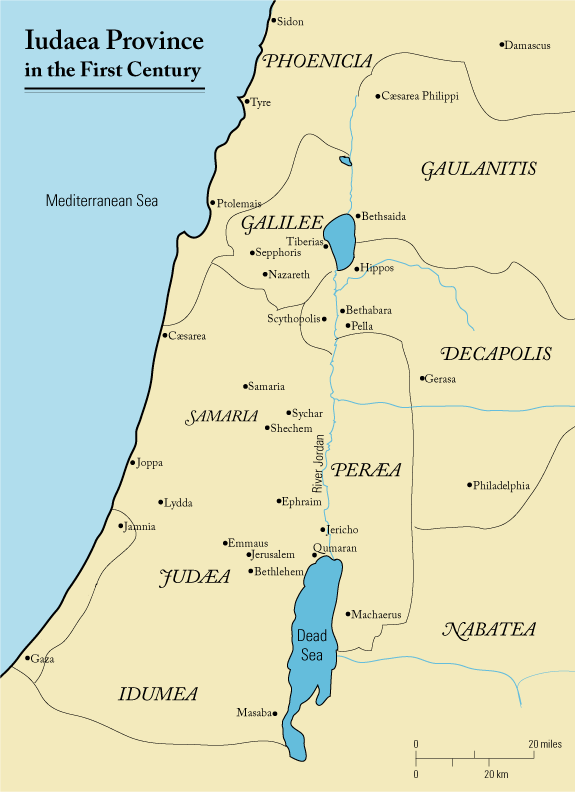
The Roman province of Judea in the 1st century AD

The religious, social, and political climate of 1st-century Roman Judea and its neighbouring provinces was extremely diverse and constantly characterized by socio-political turmoil, with numerous Judaic movements that were both religious and political. The ancient Roman–Jewish historian Flavius Josephus described the four most prominent sects within Second Temple Judaism: Pharisees, Sadducees, Essenes, and an unnamed "fourth philosophy", which modern historians recognize to be the Zealots and Sicarii. The 1st century BC and 1st century AD had numerous charismatic religious leaders contributing to what would become the Mishnah of Rabbinic Judaism, including the Jewish sages Yohanan ben Zakkai and Hanina ben Dosa. Jewish messianism, and the Jewish Messiah concept, has its roots in the apocalyptic literature produced between the 2nd century BC and the 1st century BC, promising a future "anointed" leader (messiah or king) from the Davidic line to resurrect the Israelite Kingdom of God, in place of the foreign rulers of the time.

==== Ministry of Jesus ====
The main sources of information regarding Jesus' life and teachings are the four canonical gospels, and to a lesser extent the Acts of the Apostles and the Pauline epistles. According to the Gospels, Jesus is the Son of God, who was crucified c. AD 30–33 in Jerusalem. His followers believed that he was raised from the dead and exalted by God, heralding the coming Kingdom of God.

==== Apostolic Age ====
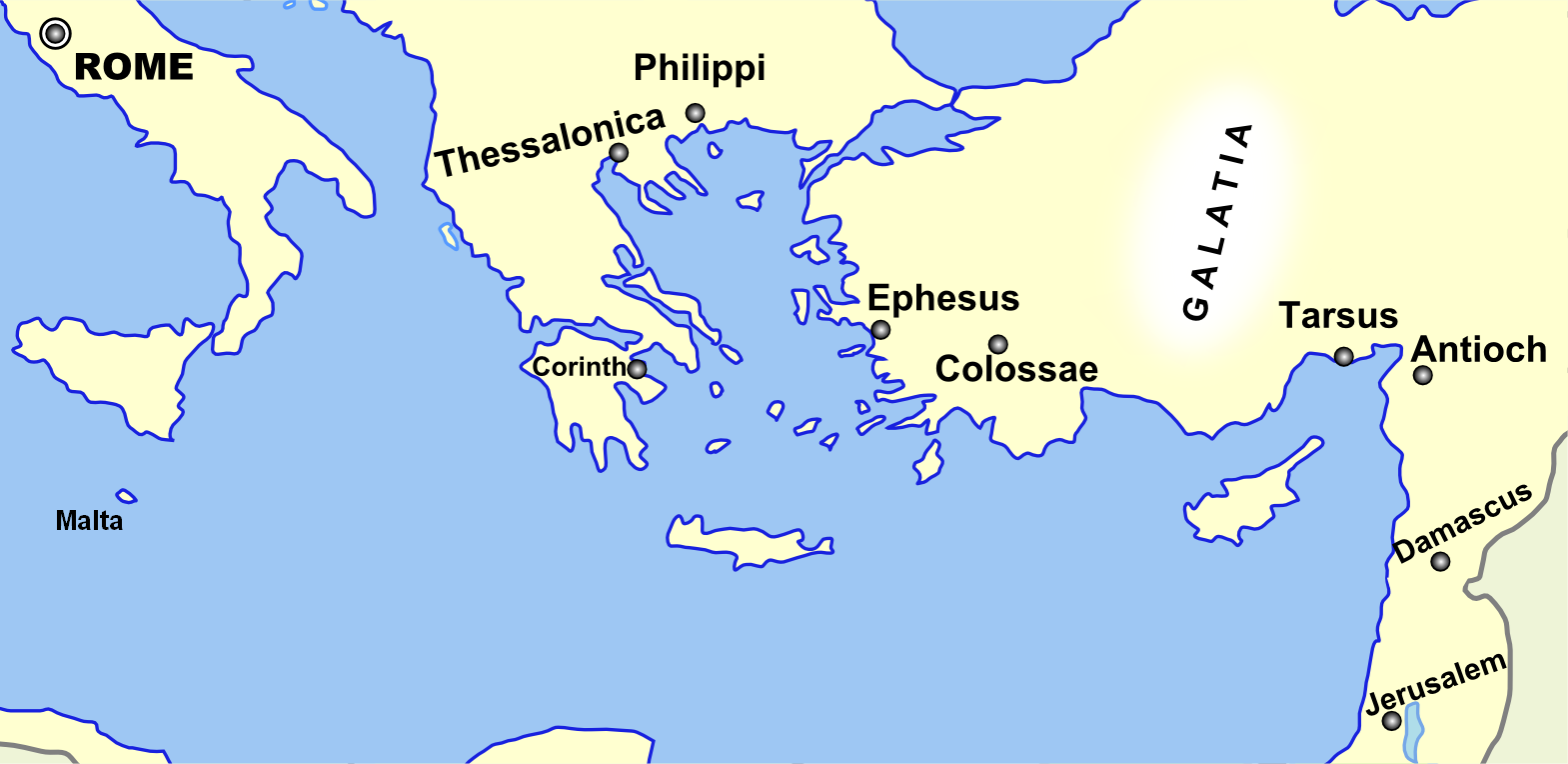
The Eastern Mediterranean region in the time of Paul the Apostle (1st century AD)

The Apostolic Age is named after the Apostles and their missionary activities. It holds special significance in Christian tradition as the age of the direct apostles of Jesus. A primary source for the Apostolic Age is the Acts of the Apostles, but its historical accuracy has been debated and its coverage is partial, focusing especially from Acts 15 onwards on the ministry of Paul, and ending around 62 AD with Paul preaching in Rome under house arrest.

The earliest followers of Jesus were a sect of apocalyptic Jewish Christians within the realm of Second Temple Judaism. The early Christian groups were strictly Jewish, such as the Ebionites, and the early Christian community in Jerusalem, led by James the Just, brother of Jesus. According to Acts 9, they described themselves as "disciples of the Lord" and [followers] "of the Way", and according to Acts 11, a settled community of disciples at Antioch were the first to be called "Christians". Some of the early Christian communities attracted God-fearers, i.e. Greco-Roman sympathizers which made an allegiance to Judaism but refused to convert and therefore retained their Gentile (non-Jewish) status, who already visited Jewish synagogues. The inclusion of Gentiles posed a problem, as they could not fully observe the Halakha. Saul of Tarsus, commonly known as Paul the Apostle, persecuted the early Jewish Christians, then converted and started his mission among the Gentiles. The main concern of Paul's letters is the inclusion of Gentiles into God's New Covenant, sending the message that faith in Christ is sufficient for salvation. Because of this inclusion of Gentiles, early Christianity changed its character and gradually grew apart from Judaism during the first two centuries of the Christian Era. The fourth-century church fathers Eusebius and Epiphanius of Salamis cite a tradition that before the destruction of Jerusalem in AD 70 the Jerusalem Christians had been warned to flee to Pella in the region of the Decapolis across the Jordan River.

=== Late antiquity ===
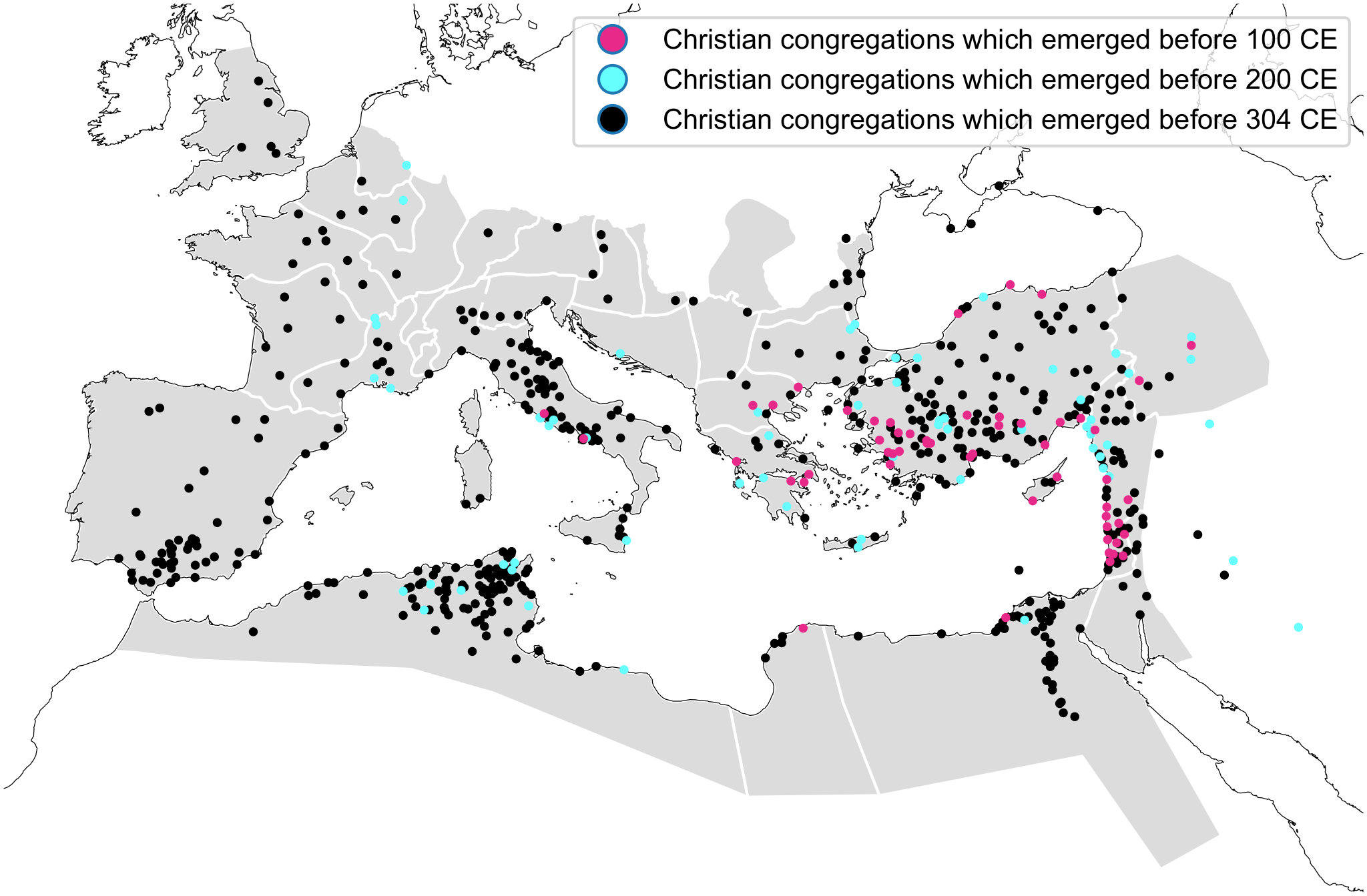
Distribution of Christian congregations in Roman territories during each of the first three centuries AD

In contrast to other groups of Christians in the Near East such as the largely Assyrian Nestorians, the vast majority of Christians in Judea (later renamed Syria Palaestina) were under the ecclesiastical jurisdiction of the emperors of the Roman Empire and later Eastern Roman Empire, as well as the Ecumenical Patriarchate after the Council of Chalcedon in 451 AD (which would be part of the Eastern Orthodox Church after the Great Schism), and were known by other Syrian Christians as Melkites (followers of the king). Helena, mother of Constantine I was responsible for the beautification or construction of the Church of the Nativity in Bethlehem, and the Church of Eleona on the Mount of Olives; sites of Christ's birth and ascension, respectively. The Melkites, during the late Roman period and under the Byzantine Empire were Hellenized, and abandoned Western Aramaic languages in favor of Greek. By the 7th century, Jerusalem and the Byzantine province of Syria Palaestina had become major centers of Greek and Christian culture in the Orient.

=== Early Middle Ages ===
The Kingdom of Jerusalem and the Crusader states with their strongholds in the Holy Land at their height, between the First and the Second Crusade (1135)

Due to the Arab Muslim invasions of the Middle East (7th–11th centuries), Christians living in the region underwent a gradual process of Arabization in which they abandoned Aramaic and Greek in favor of Arabic. The Melkites began abandoning Greek for Arabic, a process which made them the most Arabicized Christians in the Levant. Most Arab Ghassanids remained Christian and joined Melkite and Syriac communities within what is now Jordan, Israel, Palestine, Syria, and Lebanon.

The 11th-century Melkite bishop of Gaza Sulayman al-Ghazzi holds a unique place in the history of Arab Christian literature as author of the first diwan of Christian religious poetry in Arabic. His poems give insights into the life of Palestinian Christians and the religious persecution they suffered under the rule of Fatimid caliph al-Hakim (r. 996–1021).

During the Early Middle Ages, the Holy Land was the scene of several military conflicts between Christians and Muslims. In 1081, following the Byzantines' confrontation with the Seljuk Turks and the fear of Turkish expansion in Asia Minor, the Byzantine Emperor sought aid from Western Christendom. The emperor Alexios I Komnenos asked Pope Urban II for help; the latter proposed a holy war, the First Crusade in 1096. The call for a crusade gained momentum, promising indulgences for sins. Despite conflicts with the Byzantine leadership, they captured Antioch (1098) and eventually Jerusalem (1099). The conquests were marked by brutality and savagery against Muslims and Jews.

The Second Crusade (1147–1148) followed a generation later and aimed to recover lost territories. It faced internal strife and external betrayals, and resulted in failure. The Third Crusade (1189–1193) was in response to Saladin's recapture of Jerusalem. Notable European leaders like Richard the Lion-heart fought in the Crusader, however they failed to recapture Jerusalem. The Fourth Crusade (1201–1204), initiated by Pope Innocent III, it faced financial and organizational challenges. Deviating from their intended path, the Crusaders sacked Zara and Constantinople, causing lasting damage to the Byzantine Empire. The Crusaders' actions accelerated the decline of the Byzantine Christians in the Eastern Mediterranean.

=== Ottoman rule ===
Since they are considered "People of the Book" in the Islamic religion, Christians under Muslim rule were subjected to the status of dhimmi (along with Jews, Samaritans, Gnostics, Mandeans, and Zoroastrians), which was inferior to the status of Muslims. Christians and other religious minorities thus faced religious discrimination and persecution in that they were banned from proselytising (for Christians, it was forbidden to evangelize or spread Christianity) in the Muslim lands, they were banned from bearing arms, undertaking elite professions, and were obligated to dress differently in order to distinguish themselves from Arabs. Under the Islamic law (sharīʿa), Non-Muslims were obligated to pay the jizya (usually much less than wealth tax of zakat and the exemption of some people, like women and children etc.) and kharaj taxes like Muslims together with periodic ransom levied upon Christian communities by Muslim rulers in order to fund the wars happening, all of which contributed a significant proportion of income to the Muslim states under the ottoman rule sometimes chirstians would send their children to join the janissary corp in return for tax exemption, if a dhimmi joined the army they don't have to pay tax

Under the Ottoman Empire, Christians and Jews were treated as dhimmi, i.e. Non-Muslim subjects. They were granted the freedom to practice their religion under certain conditions, and were given a level of communal autonomy as outlined in the Millet system. Religious communities falling under the dhimmi category were required to pay the jizya and kharaj taxes to the Islamic state Furthermore, dhimmi were bound by specific rules that didn't apply to Muslim citizens, including the prohibition from attempting to convert Muslims to their religious faith.

=== Modern period ===
The territory of present-day Israel came under control of the United Kingdom following the defeat and collapse of the Ottoman Empire at the end of the First World War. The British established an administration in the region called Mandatory Palestine. Following the Balfour Declaration (1917) and the visit of the Zionist Commission to Mandatory Palestine (1918), local Christians participated in forming groups which opposed Zionism, called "Muslim-Christian Associations".

During the 1948 Palestine war, Palestinian Christians they were directly affected by the war and the creation of the state of Israel with what is called the "nakba" or disaster for the Palestinians. Generally, most Christians were expelled like Muslims from the territory that is now Israel, especially in the main cities and West Jerusalem, but some were allowed to remain in their homes, especially in the lower, central and Upper Galilee, because the Galilee region was conquered at the end of the war, the area was less strategic, Israel needed Arab human resources in the Galilee, and the international pressure that was visible at that time there. Four Christian villages were depopulated, razed, and had their residents expelled, such as Al-Bassa, Iqrit, Al-Mansura and Kafr Bir'im. Massacres of Christians were conducted at the villages of Eilabun and Al-Bassa. Nazareth, at that time a town with a Christian majority, was spared devastation after agreeing to halt resistance and surrender, and because Israel did not want to visibly provoke an outcry in the Christian world.

According to the Israeli Ministry of Foreign Affairs, since the reunification of Jerusalem after the Six-Day War (1967), the Christian as well as Jewish and Islamic holy sites were opened for multinational pilgrims by the Israeli authorities for the first time since 1948, when the Kingdom of Jordan took over the eastern half of the city.

The Christian population in Israel has increased with the immigration of many mixed families from the former Soviet Union (1989 to late 1990s), and through the influx of approximately 7,000 Christian Maronites from Lebanon in 2000. Recently, a further increase in Christianity came with arrival of many foreign workers and asylum seekers, some of Christian background (for instance from the Philippines, Eritrea, Ethiopia, and South Sudan). As a result, numerous churches have opened in Tel Aviv. As of 2013, the Government - Christians Forum was formed in Jerusalem by Mordechai Zaken, head of the Minorities Affairs Desk at the Ministry of Public Security, to address the concerns of Christians as a minority group. Since many of these Christians are Catholic, the Latin Patriarchate of Jerusalem created a vicariate to serve their particular needs, and has lobbied on their behalf. Speaking to Aid to the Church in Need, Sister Gabriele Penka, administrator of the vicariate summed up the complexity of their situation. "Israel tells them that they have to work and show a payslip to obtain a visa, but at the same time, Israel will not officially declare that they have the right to work. They are told they need a payslip, but it is almost impossible to get one with no documents. We went to all the ministries related to this, and no one was able to give us a straight answer about what the legal status of these people is."

A 2021 survey by CBS found that 84% of Christians were satisfied with life in Israel. The survey also found Arab Christian women were the most educated demographic in Israel. Concern was expressed by the patriarchs, however, over extremist groups in Israeli society. In 2023, the Latin Patriarch—the head of the Latin Church in the Holy Land—alleged that a shift toward far-right politics under the premiership of Benjamin Netanyahu led to greater attacks on Christians. The President of Israel, Isaac Herzog, and the Israeli chief of police condemned the violence against Christians. The Israeli police chief stated the police conducted operations to "eradicate" the phenomena. However, Christians have said they do not necessarily feel protected by authorities and a study by the Jerusalem-based Rossing Center, published in 2025, found that attacks had increased.

In March 2023, Knesset legislators Moshe Gafni and Yaakov Asher submitted a bill that would have banned the proselytizing of Christianity in Israel. Due to an uproar from Evangelical Christians in America, who generally support Israel, Prime Minister Netanyahu announced that the bill would not move forward.

The issue of taxation remains a complex and controversial topic in Israel. Occasionally municipal authorities send churches bills for unpaid taxes and threaten legal action, while Churches continue to claim that they should be exempt. Attempts to solve the issue politically remain stalled.

== Affiliations ==
=== Catholic Church ===
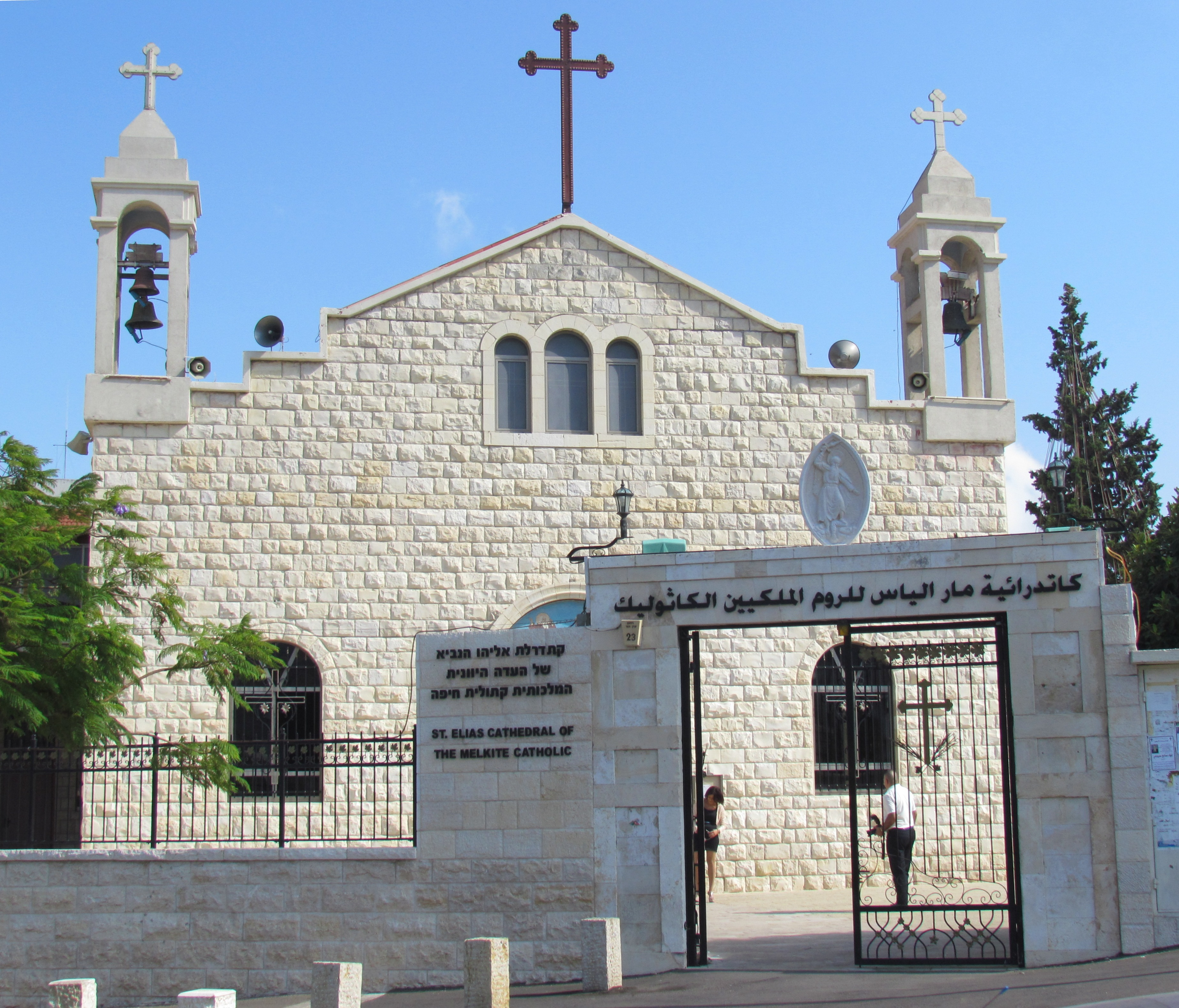
St. Elijah Cathedral of the Melkite Greek Catholic Church, in Haifa.

Six of the particular churches of the Catholic Church have jurisdiction within Israel: the Melkite Greek Catholic Church (the largest Catholic church in Israel), the Latin Church (the dominant Catholic church worldwide), the Armenian Catholic Church, the Chaldean Catholic Church, the Syriac Catholic Church and the Maronite Church. According to 2020 estimates, Catholics make up more than half of all Christians in Israel. The majority are of Arab descent, while there is a small community of Hebrew Catholics.

=== Eastern Orthodox churches ===
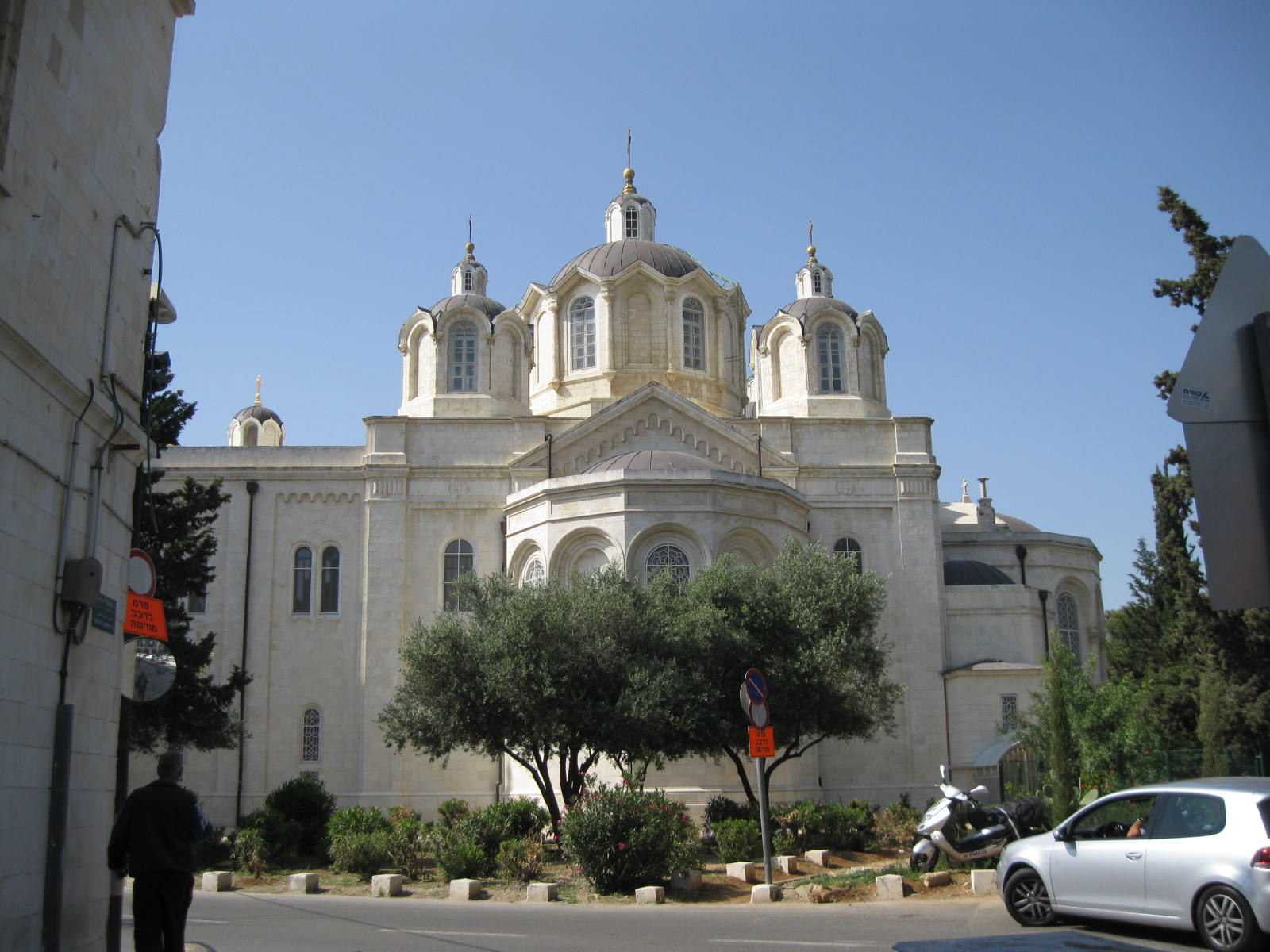
The Holy Trinity Cathedral of the Russian Orthodox Church, in Jerusalem.

Around 30% of Christians in Israel are adherents of the Eastern Orthodox Church, mostly to the Greek Orthodox Patriarchate of Jerusalem, which has jurisdiction over all Israel and Palestine. Eastern Orthodox Christians in Israel and Palestine have many churches, monasteries, seminaries, and other religious institutions all over the land, particularly in Jerusalem. Israel also has many followers of the Russian Orthodox Church, mainly through interfaith marriages and immigration from the former Soviet Union (1989–1990s).

=== Oriental Orthodox churches ===
Oriental Orthodoxy in Israel is represented mainly by adherents of the Armenian Apostolic Church, represented by the Armenian Patriarchate of Jerusalem, and adherents of the Syriac Orthodox Church.

=== Protestantism ===
Since the foundation of the State of Israel in 1948, there has been a small Protestant community, composed of both Arab Christians, who changed their religious affiliation to Protestant teachings, and European and American residents moving to the area, and divided in several denominations. According to 2020 estimates, Protestants make up less than one in ten of Christians in Israel.

==== Anglican Communion ====
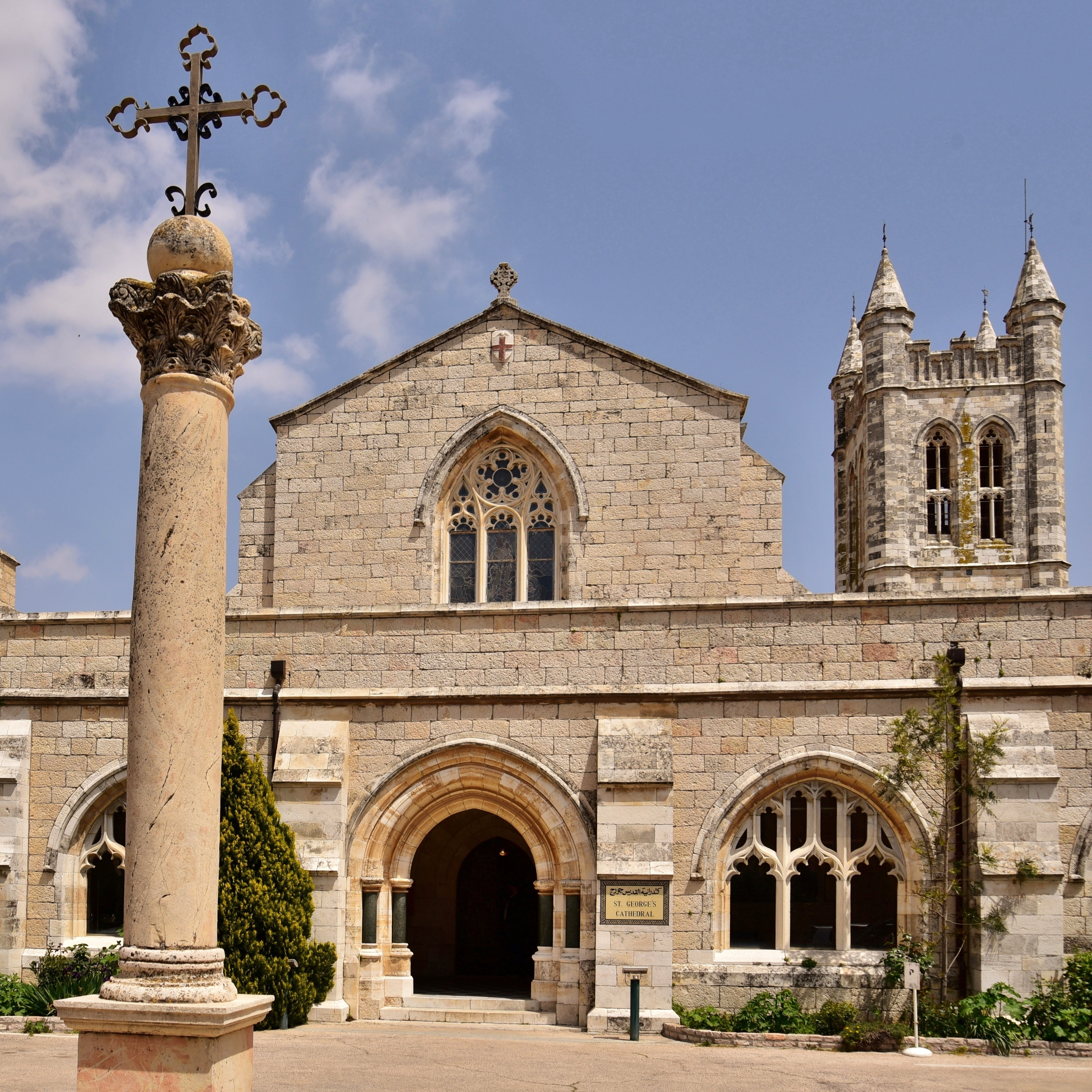
St. George's Cathedral of the Episcopal Church in Jerusalem and the Middle East, in Jerusalem.

The Episcopal Church in Jerusalem and the Middle East is a province of the Anglican Communion, whose Bishop of Jerusalem has its seat in the St. George's Cathedral of Jerusalem. Other prominent Episcopal churches in the Holy Land include the Christ Church in Jerusalem (built in 1849, it is inside the Jaffa Gate of the contested Old City of Jerusalem) and the Christ Church in Nazareth (built in 1871); they were both built during the Ottoman rule of the Holy Land. The Episcopal Church in Jerusalem and the Middle East counts 35,000 members, scattered all over the region while the Diocese of Jerusalem counts 7,000 members and 29 congregations.

==== Baptists ====
The Association of Baptist Churches in Israel, established in 1965, is part of the Baptist World Alliance, the home mission for Baptist churches in Israel and the "largest network of evangelical churches in the country", counting 18 churches, 1000 baptized members and a community of 3000 people. The Baptist Village (Kfar HaBaptistim), north of Petah Tikva, was established in 1955 as a farming community with "a boarding school for orphans ... now used mainly for conferences and camps."

==== Lutherans ====
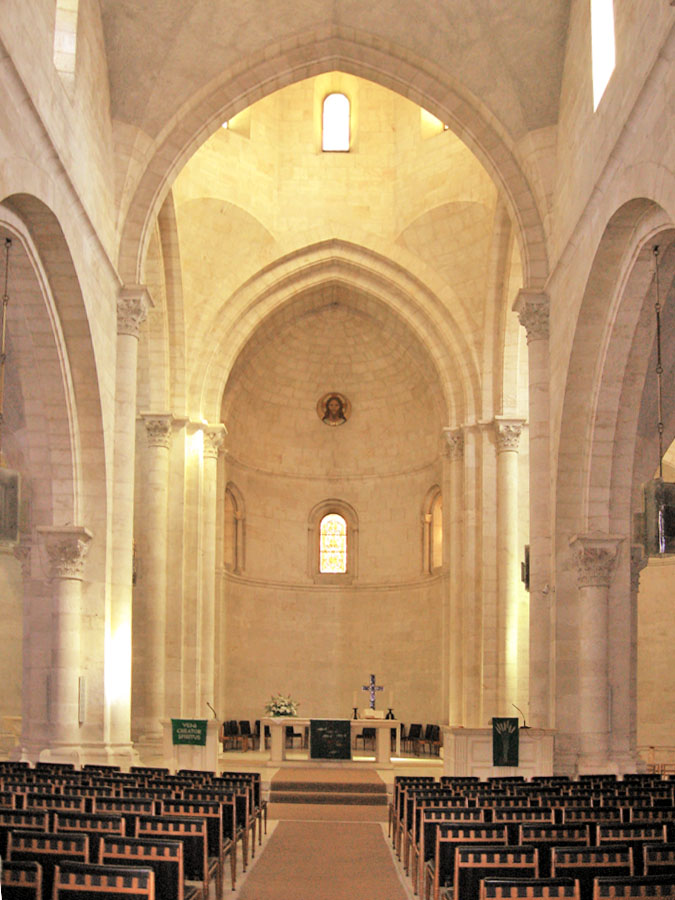
The interior of the Lutheran Church of the Redeemer in Jerusalem

The Evangelical Lutheran Church in Jordan and the Holy Land is a Lutheran denomination, part of the Lutheran World Federation, that has congregations also in Jordan and State of Palestine. First recognized as an autonomous religious community by King Hussein of Jordan in 1959, the church currently has 2,500 members and six congregations. The cathedral church is the Lutheran Church of the Redeemer in Jerusalem, where the Bishop has its seat and that is the only congregation in Israel.

==== Messianic Jews ====
The Messianic Jewish movement, usually considered a syncretist form of Christianity, emerged in the United States in the 1960s. The number of Messianic Jews in Israel is estimated at 20,000. In 2006, there were at least twelve Messianic congregations in Jerusalem. On 23 February 2007, Israeli Channel 2 released a news documentary about the growing number of Messianic Jews in Israel.

Messianic Jews are not considered bona-fide Jews under Israel's Law of Return. (See also: Rufeisen v. Minister of the Interior). The Law of Return stipulates that a Jew is someone with a Jewish mother or someone who has converted to Judaism and is not a member of another religion. The Israeli Chief Rabbinate requires documents proving the Jewishness of one's mother, grandmother, great-grandmother, and great-great-grandmother when applying for marriage. The British Office of the Chief Rabbi (OCR) has underlined the basic principle that a child is not recognised by the OCR and other bodies as Jewish unless their mother is Jewish, or they underwent a conversion recognized by the body.

=== Restorationism ===
==== Jehovah's Witnesses ====
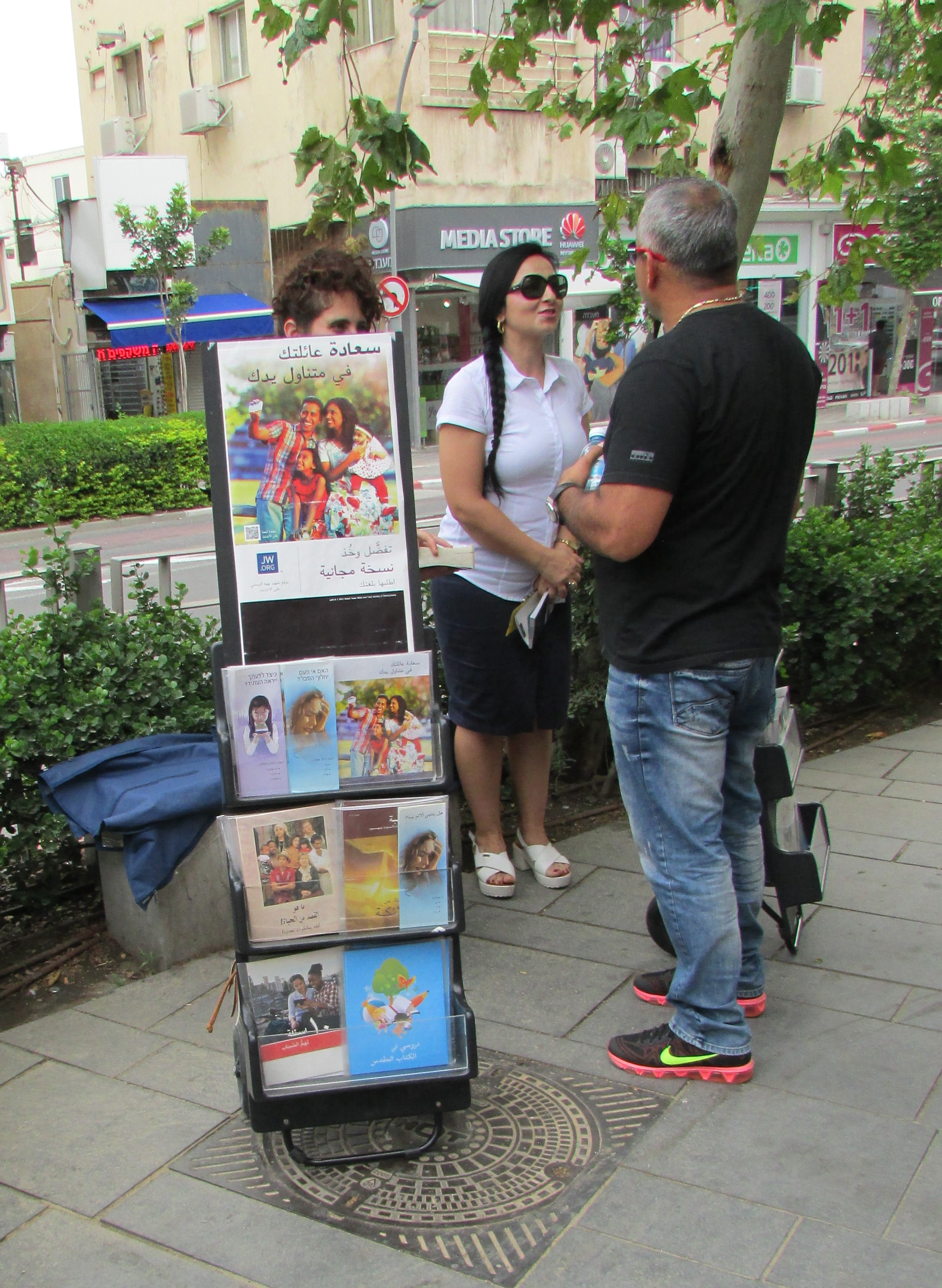
Jehovah's Witnesses preaching in Haifa, Israel

Jehovah's Witnesses have been present for decades in Israel. By 1999 it was estimated there were about 850 Jehovah's Witnesses in Israel. In 2020, there were 1,957 active members, organised in 31 congregations, while 3,653 people attended the annual celebration of Lord's Evening Meal. Israeli JW congregants have faced some religious persecution in the past century: for instance, in March 1997, a mob of over 250 ultra-orthodox Jews attacked one of their meeting halls.

==== Mormons ====
The Church of Jesus Christ of Latter-day Saints (LDS Church) is present in Israel with 338 members and three congregations. Israeli LDS congregants hold their Sabbath services on Saturday. In 1989 the Brigham Young University, sponsored by the LDS Church, established the satellite campus BYU Jerusalem Center on Mount of Olives in East Jerusalem.

== Relations with other religions ==
=== Christian–Jewish relations ===
==== Background ====
Hebrew-speakers call Christians Notzri (also romanized Notsri), which means Nazarene (originated from Nazareth). The word is cognate to the Arabic Nasrani.

The Israeli Declaration of Independence, issued in 1948, describes the country as a Jewish state but extends religious freedoms to its inhabitants by stating that the State of Israel will ensure complete equality of social and political rights to all its inhabitants irrespective of religion, race or sex; it will guarantee freedom of religion, conscience, language, education and culture; it will safeguard the Holy Places of all religions.

==== Tensions ====
Some ultra-Orthodox Jews have been reported to have a decades-old practice of cursing and spitting on Christian clergymen in Jerusalem, and there have been cases where churches and cemeteries were defaced by price taggers. When the doors of the Latrun Trappist monastery were set aflame and the phrase "Jesus was a monkey" was painted on its walls in September 2012, the Vatican reacted with a rare official complaint against the Israeli government's inaction. In June 2015, an auxiliary building of the Church of the Multiplication was significantly damaged by an arson attack and its walls defaced by Hebrew graffiti, bearing the words "the false gods will be eliminated" (quoted from the Aleinu prayer). This attack was labelled as "terrorism" by Israeli officials. In June and July 2023, Jewish extremists repeatedly stormed a Catholic church and monastery in Haifa, leading to protests by the local Christians and clashes at the site between them and the extremists. From 2018 to 2023, a total of 157 attacks on Christian sanctities in Israel by extremist Jews were documented. Both before and during the Gaza war, Israeli settlers conducted violent attacks and arson in Taybeh, the last remaining majority Christian village in the West Bank.

==== Prosperity of the Christian community ====
Gabriel Naddaf argues that Israel is the only country in which Christian communities have been able to thrive in the Middle East. However, there has also been criticism by Palestinian Christians of this claim, with such statements being called a "manipulation" of the facts. Members of the Palestinian Christian community claim that such statements attempt to hide the discrimination that Arab Christians face within Israel due to alleged discrimination against Arabs as well as the effect of the occupation of the West Bank and Gaza on the Christian population in these areas.

==== United Allies ====
Recently, there has been a steady undercurrent of Arab Christians who seek deeper integration into Israeli society. Under the leadership of Greek Orthodox priest Gabriel Naddaf, United Allies is a political party that advocates Christian enlistment in the Israel Defense Forces and a more distinct societal separation of Christians from Muslims. This separation is partly based on the purported fact that Christians in Israel are not technically Arabs, seeing as they were present in the holy land long before the Arab conquest, hallmarked by the Siege of Jerusalem. This distinction is in the process of being formalized into law, as the Likud government is currently drafting legislation to grant this request.

This new attitude is founded largely by the perception by some that only in Israel the Christian population is growing due to natural increase and no state persecution, seeing the entire Middle East, except Lebanon, as where Christianity is and has been rapidly on the decline. In addition, increasing numbers of Christian leaders and community members are pointing to Muslim violence as a threat to their way of life in Arab majority cities and towns. Sons of the New Testament as a party and a national movement has been met with wide admiration from the Jews of Israel, harshly negative scorn from the Muslim Arabs, and mixed reactions from the Christians themselves. Because of Israel's parliamentary system where each party must attain at least 2% of the popular vote, Sons of the New Testament must be supported by non-Christians to enter the Knesset. In its strongest performance since it began contesting elections in 2019, the party's received a total of 677 votes, or 0.01% of the vote, in the 2020 Israeli legislative election. In the 2022 Israeli legislative election, the party received 234 votes.

==== Interfaith institutions ====
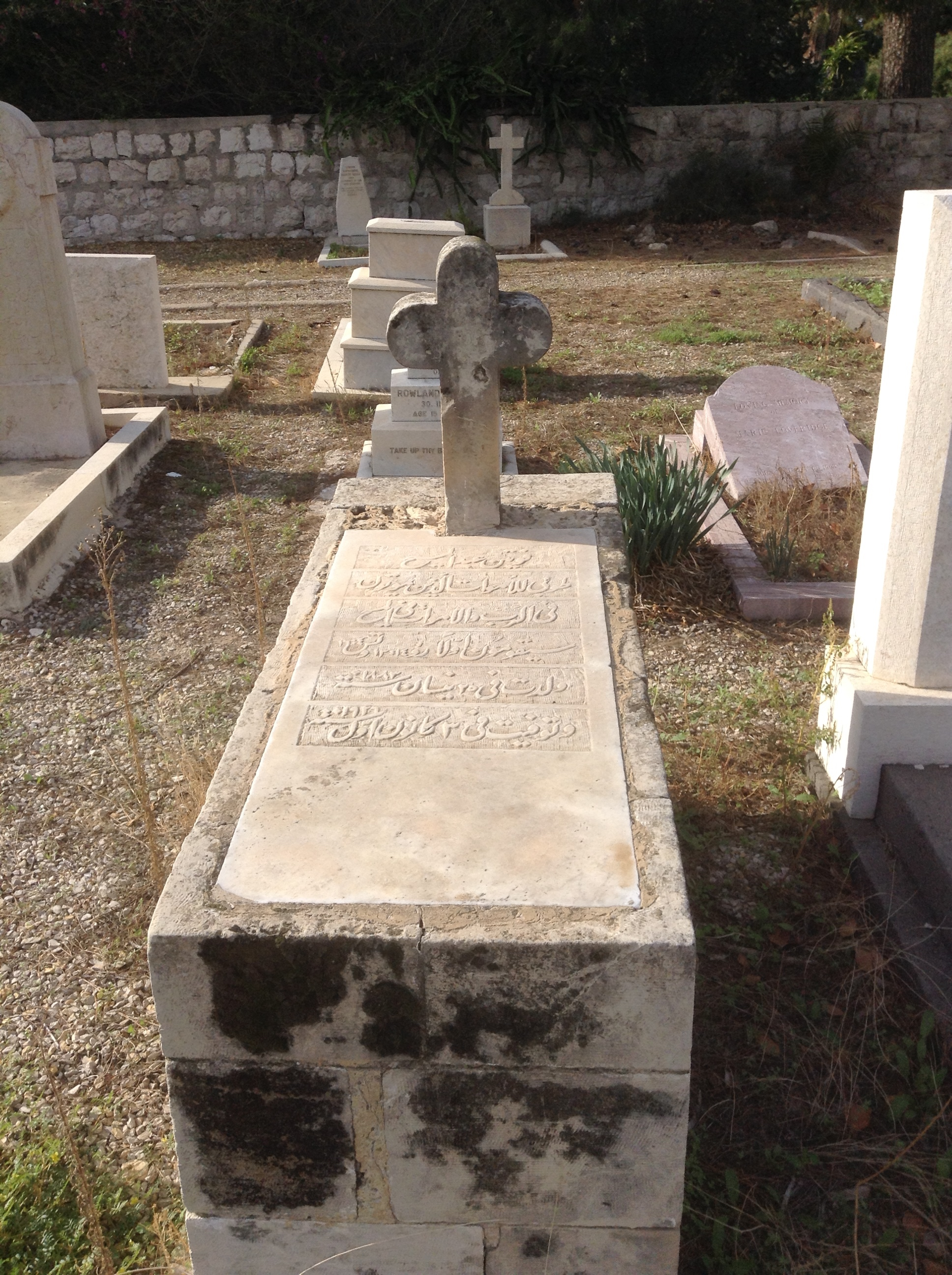
Arab Christian cemetery in Haifa, Israel

In 2008, Shlomo Riskin, the chief rabbi of Efrat, established the Center for Jewish–Christian Understanding and Cooperation (CJCUC), the first Orthodox Jewish institution to dialogue with the Christian world on a religious and theological basis. The center, currently located in Jerusalem, engages in Hebraic Bible Study for Christians, from both the local community and from abroad, has organized numerous interfaith praise initiatives, such as Day to Praise, and has established many fund-raising initiatives such as Blessing Bethlehem which aim to aid the persecuted Christian community of Bethlehem, in part, and the larger persecuted Christian population of the Middle East region and throughout the world.

=== Christian–Muslim relations ===
A 2012 survey indicated that Christians in Israel were prosperous and well-educated, but some feared that Muslim intimidation would provoke an exodus to the West. The Christian communities in Nazareth tend to be wealthier and better educated compared to other Arabs elsewhere in Israel, and Christians in Nazareth occupy the majority of the top positions in the town: three hospitals and bank managers, judges and school principals and faculties. The socio-economic gap between the Christians' wealth and Muslims' poverty led sometimes to sectarian crises.

Recently there has been an increase of anti-Christian incidents in the Nazareth area, inspired by the rise of jihadist forces in the Middle East. Many Christians have complained of being targeted by Muslims, whom they believe are trying to either drive them out of cities that have traditionally had large Christian populations, or to "persuade" them to convert. In 1999, for example, radical Muslims in Nazareth rioted as they attempted to wrest land from a major Christian shrine to build a mosque. In one incident during 2014, a flag of the Islamic State of Iraq and the Levant was installed in front of a church in Nazareth.

There has also been increasing incitement and violence by the Muslims against Christians who voice their support for the Israel Defense Forces. In a recent case, the son of Gabriel Naddaf, a prominent Eastern Orthodox priest who is regarded as being pro-Israel, was severely beaten. Naddaf has experienced considerable hostility from Muslims in recent years.

A 2015 study estimated that some 300 Christians were from a Muslim background in Israel.

A 2016 study by Pew research points to the convergence of political views of both Muslims and Christians over issues like– Israel cannot be a Jewish state and a democracy at the same time (Christians: 72%; Muslims: 63%), US being too supportive of Israel (Christians: 86%; Muslims: 75%), Israeli government not making enough efforts to make peace with Palestine (Christians: 80%; Muslims: 72%).

== Demographics ==
Israel has a population of 182,000 Christians. As of 2021, it was the only growing Christian community in the Middle East. In 2019, 77.5% of Christians in Israel were Arab Christians, representing 7.2% of the total Arab population in the country.

Israeli Christian population pyramid in 2021

=== Population over the years ===
The following table shows the evolution of the Christian population in Israel over time. The Christian population has followed an overall trend of growth over time since the establishment of the State of Israel.

Israeli Christian population at end of year

Year	Pop.	±% p.a.
1949	34,000	—
1950	36,000	+5.88%
1960	49,600	+3.26%
1970	75,500	+4.29%
1980	89,900	+1.76%

Year	Pop.	±% p.a.
1990	114,700	+2.47%
2000	135,100	+1.65%
2010	153,400	+1.28%
2020	179,500	+1.58%
2024	181,800	+0.32%

=== Education ===
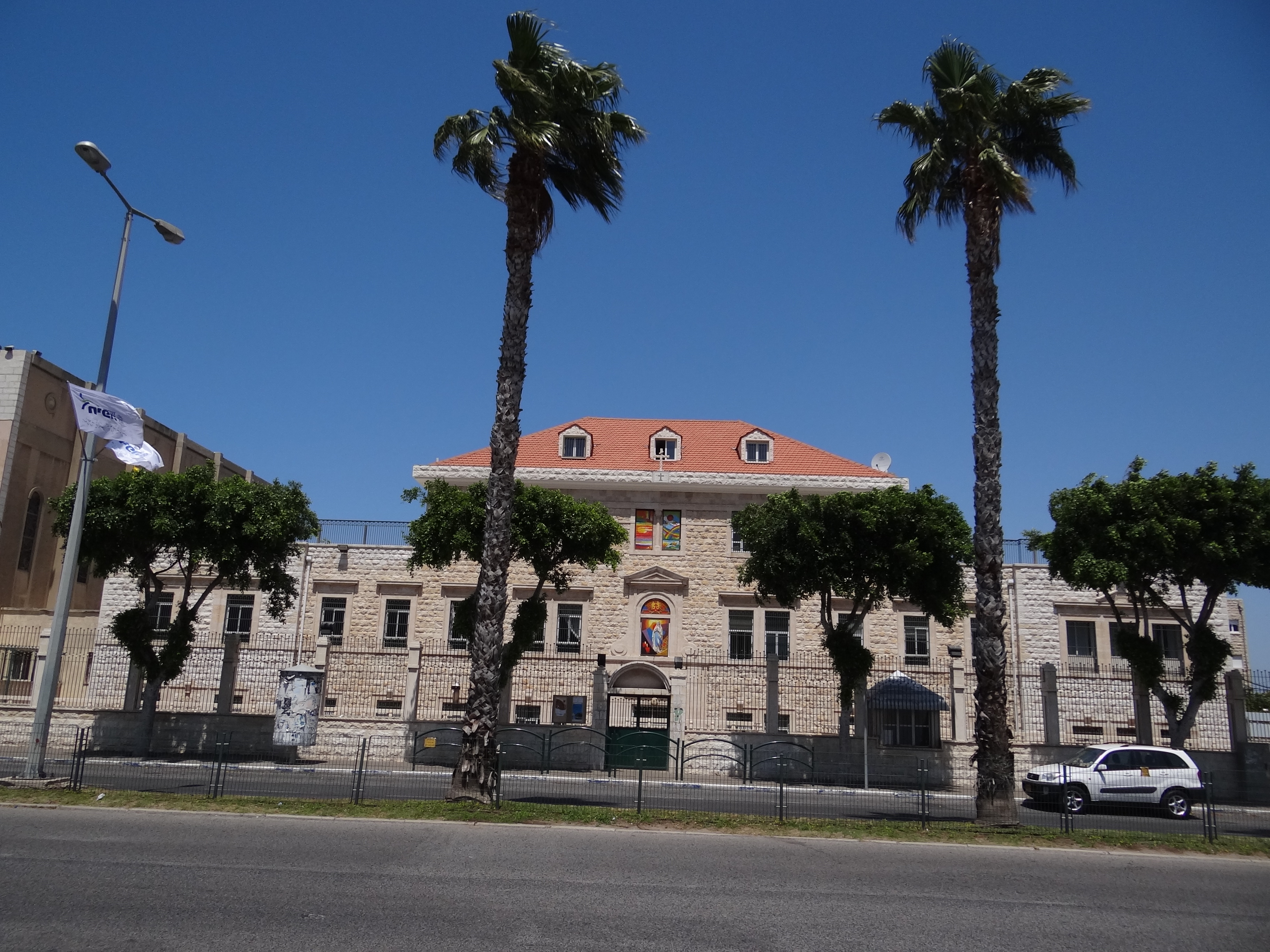
Catholic school in Haifa: High level Christian schools are among Israel's best performing educational institutions.

Christian schools in Israel are among the best schools in the country, and while those schools represent only 4% of the Arab schooling sector, about 34% of Arab university students come from Christian schools, and about 87% of the Israeli Arabs in the high tech sector have been educated in Christian schools.

==== High school and matriculation exams ====
In 2012, the Israel Central Bureau of Statistics noted that when taking into account the data recorded over the years, Arab Christians fared the best in terms of education in comparison to any other group receiving an education in Israel. In 2016 Arab Christians had the highest rates of success at matriculation examinations, namely 73.9%, both in comparison to Muslim and Druze Israelis (41% and 51.9% respectively), and to the students from the different branches of the Hebrew (majority Jewish) education system considered as one group (55.1%).

==== Higher education ====
According to various reports, Arab Christians are one of the most educated groups in Israel. According to data from the Israel Central Bureau of Statistics (2023), Arab Christians in Israel have one of the highest levels of educational attainment among all religious communities. Specifically, 55% of Arab Christians have completed college degree or postgraduate education. According to data from the Israel Central Bureau of Statistics (2019), Arab Christian students were less likely than their Arab Muslim counterparts to pursue fields such as teacher training, business, or paramedical studies. However, a higher proportion of Arab Christian students chose to study fields such as law, medicine, computer sciences, mathematics, engineering and architecture. In 2023, the Israel Central Bureau of Statistics revealed that Arab Christian women were the most highly educated demographic in Israel.

According to a 2016 study by the Pew Research Center, 33% of Jews (based on a sample of 3,020) have a college degree (ranging from 13% for Haredi to 45% for Hiloni), compared to 18% for Christians (based on a sample of 375).

The percentage of Arab Christian women who attend institutions of higher education is also higher than that of other groups. The rate of students studying in the field of medicine was higher among Christian Arab students than that of all other sectors. In 2013, Arab Christian students were also the vanguard in terms of eligibility for higher education, as the Christian Arab students had the highest rates of receiving Psychometric Entrance Test scores which make them eligible for acceptance into universities, data from the Israel Central Bureau of Statistics show that 61% of Arab Christians were eligible for university studies, compared to 50% of Jewish, 45% of Druze, and 35% of Muslim students.

=== Socio-economic ===
In terms of their socio-economic situation, Arab Christians are more similar to the Jewish population than to the Muslim Arab population. They have the lowest incidence of poverty and the lowest percentage of unemployment which is 4.9% compared to 6.5% among Jewish men and women. They have also the highest median household income among Arab citizens of Israel and second highest median household income among the Israeli ethno-religious groups. Arab Christians also have a high presentation in science and in the white collar professions. In Israel, Arab Christians are portrayed as a hard-working and upper-middle-class educated ethno-religious minority. According to study the majority of Christians in Israel (68.2 per cent) are employed in the service sector, i.e. banks, insurance companies, schools, tourism, hospitals etc.

Political affiliation among Israeli Arab Christians, 2015
Hadash	35%
Balad	14%
Israeli Labor Party	9%
Meretz	6%
Ra'am	4%
Kadima	2%
Yesh Atid	2%
Yisrael Beytenu	1%
No party	26%

=== Largest communities ===
In 2019, approximately 70.2% of Arab Christians resided in the Northern District, 13.3% in the Haifa District, 9.5% in the Jerusalem District, 3.4% in the Central District, 2.7% in the Tel Aviv District and 0.5% in the Southern District. Approximately 23.5% of Non-Arab Christians resided in the Tel Aviv District, 19.4% in the Haifa District, 17.5% in the Central District, 14.4% in the Northern District, 14.3% in the Southern District and 9.8% in the Jerusalem District.

Nazareth has the largest Christian Arab population, followed by Haifa. The majority of Haifa's Arab minority is Christian. The Christian Arab communities in Nazareth and Haifa tend to be wealthier and better educated compared to Arabs elsewhere in Israel. Arab Christians also live in a number of other localities in the Galilee; such as Abu Snan, Arraba, Bi'ina, Deir Hanna, I'billin, Jadeidi-Makr, Kafr Kanna, Muqeible, Ras al-Ein, Reineh, Sakhnin, Shefa-Amr, Tur'an and Yafa an-Naseriyye.

Localities such as Eilabun, Jish, Kafr Yasif and Rameh are predominantly Christian, and nearly all residents of Fassuta and Mi'ilya are Melkite Christians. Some Druze villages, such as Daliyat al-Karmel, Ein Qiniyye, Hurfeish, Isfiya, Kisra-Sumei, Maghar, Majdal Shams and Peki'in, have small Christian Arab populations. Mixed cities such as Acre, Jerusalem, Lod, Ma'alot-Tarshiha, Nof HaGalil, Ramla and Tel Aviv-Jaffa have significant Christian Arab populations.

Largest Christian communities as of 2017 and 2018:
Northern District				Haifa District				Jerusalem District				Tel Aviv				Central District			
City	Christian population	% of total pop.	Data from:	City	Christian population	% of total pop.	Data from:	City	Christian population	% of total pop.	Data from:	City	Christian population	% of total pop.	Data from:	City	Christian population	% of total pop.	Data from:
Nazareth	21,900	28.6%	2018	Haifa	20,000: (of them 16.100 Arab Chr.)	7.1%	2018	Jerusalem	16,000: (of them 12.700 Arab Chr.)	1.8%	2018	Tel Aviv	7,000: (majority of them non-Arab Chr.)	1%	2018	Ramla	3,500	4.7%	2019
Shefa-'Amr	10,300	25.1%	2018	Isfiya	1,700	13.7%	2019									Lod	800	1.0%	2019
Nof HaGalil	7,500	18.1%	2019	Daliyat al-Karmel	17	0.1%	2017												
I'billin	5,600	42.8%	2017																
Kafr Yasif	5,200	52.2%	2017																
Maghar	4,700	21.0%	2017																
Acre	4,235	8.5%	2019																
Eilabun	4,000	70.8%	2017																
Rameh	3,800	50.0%	2017																
Yafa an-Naseriyye	3,500	18.5%	2017																
Mi'ilya	3,200	97.4%	2017																
Fassuta	3,100	99.8%	2017																
Reineh	2,900	15.4%	2017																
Kafr Kanna	2,200	10.1%	2017																
Abu Snan	2,100	15.4%	2017																
Ma'alot-Tarshiha	2,100	10.1%	2017																
Jish	1,900	63.5%	2017																
Tur'an	1,600	11.4%	2017																
Sakhnin	1,600	5.2%	2017																
Jadeidi-Makr	1,520	7.2%	2019																
Peki'in	1,222	20.8%	2019																
Deir Hanna	1,000	10.0%	2017																
Bi'ina	600	7.4%	2017																
Kisra-Sumei	317	3.6%	2019																
Arraba	310	1.2%	2017																
Muqeible	220	10.0%	2017																
Hurfeish	200	3.2%	2017																
Yarka	17	0.1%	2019																
Majdal Shams	11	0.1%	2019																
Ein Qiniyye	10	0.5%	2019																

- Note: The overwhelming majority of the Christians in the Northern District are Arab Christians.

== Religiosity ==
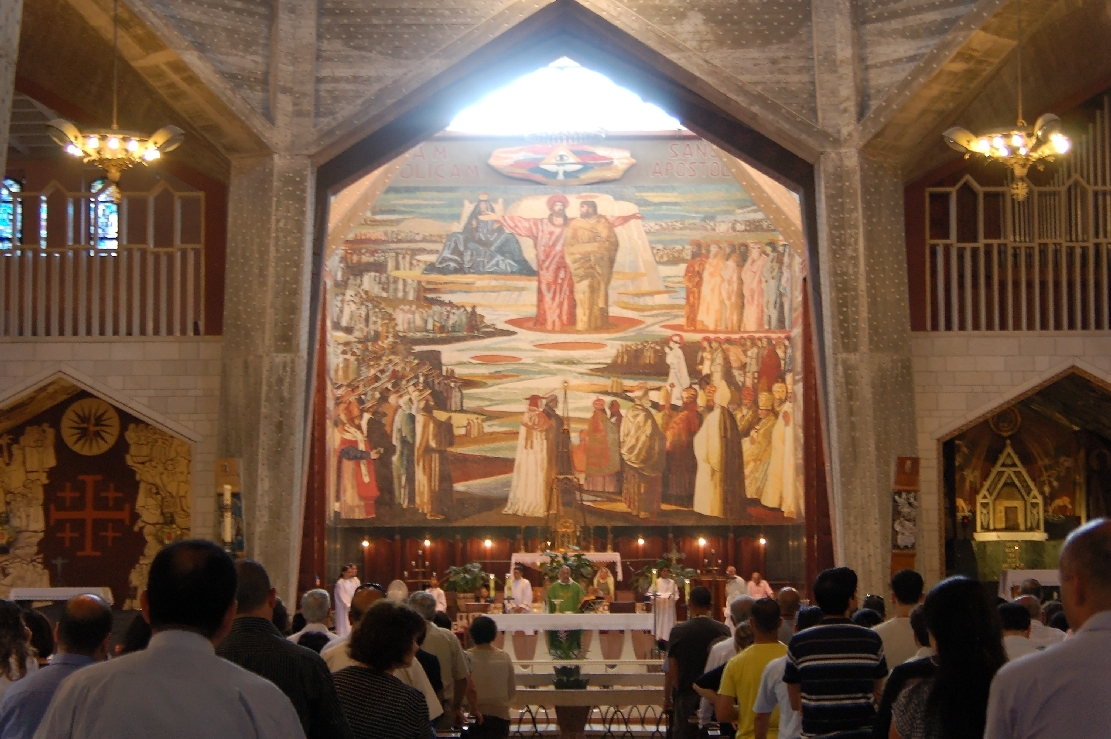
Catholic Mass in the Basilica of the Annunciation in Nazareth.

Christians in Israel are generally more religious than Israeli Jews and Druze. Over half (57%) say religion is very important in their lives. About one third (34%) pray daily and 38% report that they attend church at least once a week. Israeli Christians also are more likely than Jews and Druze to participate in weekly worship services. Nearly all (94%) Israeli Christians believe in God, of whom 79% say they are absolutely certain.

=== Beliefs and practices ===
According to a Pew Research Center survey conducted in 2015, 60% of Christians in Israel fast during Lent, Most (81%) also said that they have icons of saints or other holy figures in their home. Of them, 83% claimed that their icons were anointed with holy oil. The survey also found that the majority of Israeli Christians (89%) say the Bible is the word of God, of whom 65% believe that the Bible should be taken literally. 33% of Christians believe that Jesus will return during their lifetime, which was similar to the number of Muslims who held that belief (33%).

The majority of Christians are not comfortable with their child marrying outside of the faith.

=== Identity ===
Christians in Israel are more likely than Jews, Muslims, and Druze to say they are proud of their identity. About 89% say they have a strong sense of belonging to the Christian community. Two thirds believe that they have a special responsibility to help fellow members of their religious group who are in need around the world.

The nature of Christian identity varies among Christians as well. Christians in Israel are about evenly divided among those who say their identity is mainly a matter of religion (31%), those who say being Christian is mainly about ancestry and/or culture (34%) and those who say their identity is characterized by a combination of religion and ancestry/culture (34%).

=== Aramean identity ===
In September 2014, Minister of the Interior Gideon Sa'ar instructed the Population and Immigration Authority to recognize Arameans as an ethnicity separate from Israeli Arabs. Under the Ministry of the Interior's guidance, people born into Christian families or clans who have either Aramaic or Maronite cultural heritage within their family are eligible to register as Arameans. About 200 Christian families were thought to be eligible prior to this decision. According to an August 9, 2013 Israel Hayom article, at that time an estimated 10,500 persons were eligible to receive Aramean ethnic status according to the new regulation, including 10,000 Maronites (which included 2,000 former SLA members) and 500 Syriac Catholics.

The first person to receive the "Aramean" ethnic status in Israel was 2 year old Yaakov Halul in Jish on October 20, 2014.

Another milestone in recognizing the Aramean minority as a distinct culture in Israel was made by the Israeli Supreme Court in 2019, which ruled that the Aramean minority could choose Jewish or Arab education, rather than making children with Aramean identity to be automatically designated to Arabic-language schools.

The recognition of the Aramean ethnicity led to mixed reactions among Israeli minorities, the Christian community, and among the general Arab Israeli population. While some celebrated the success of their long legal struggle to be recognized as a non-Arab ethnic minority, other members of the Arab community in Israel denounced it as an attempt to divide Arab Christians. Representatives of the Greek Orthodox Patriarchate of Jerusalem officially denounced the move.

Many in Israeli academia advocate the recognition of the Aramean identity and have called on the government of Israel to promote the awareness regarding this issue on the basis of the international principle of ethnic self-determination as espoused by Wilson's 14 points. One of the staunchest supporters of the recognition of the Aramean identity is Gabriel Naddaf, who is one of the leaders of the Christians in Israel. He advocated on behalf of his Aramean followers and thanked the Interior Ministry's decision as a "historic move".

== Maps ==
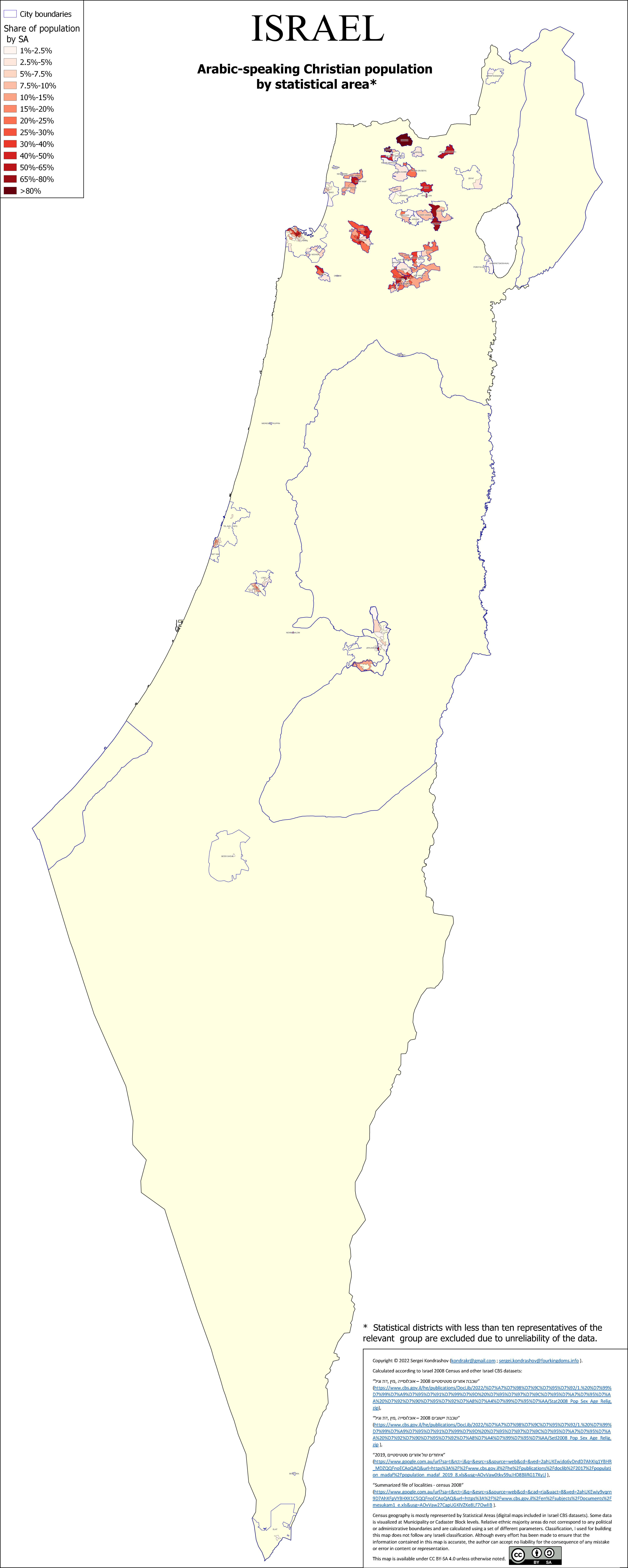
Geographical distribution of the Arabic-speaking Christian population of Israel by statistical area.

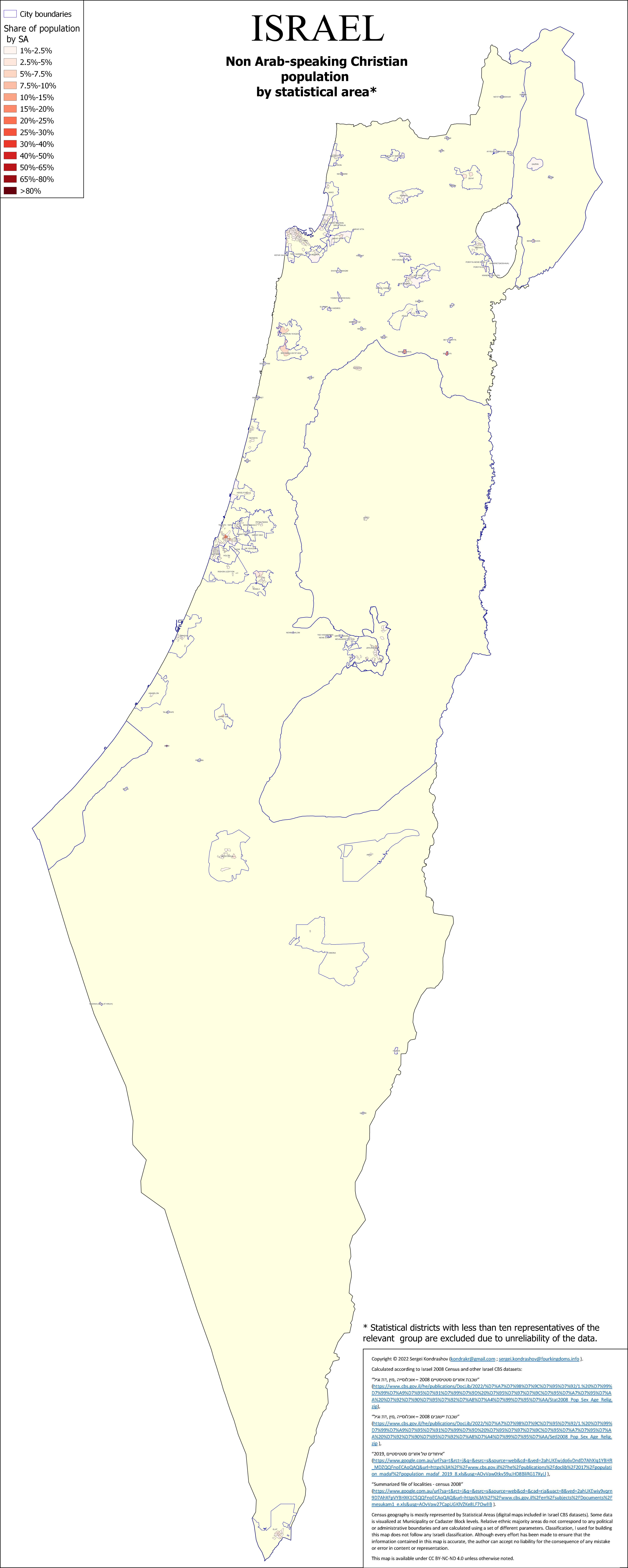
Geographical distribution of the Non-Arabic-speaking Christian population of Israel by statistical area.

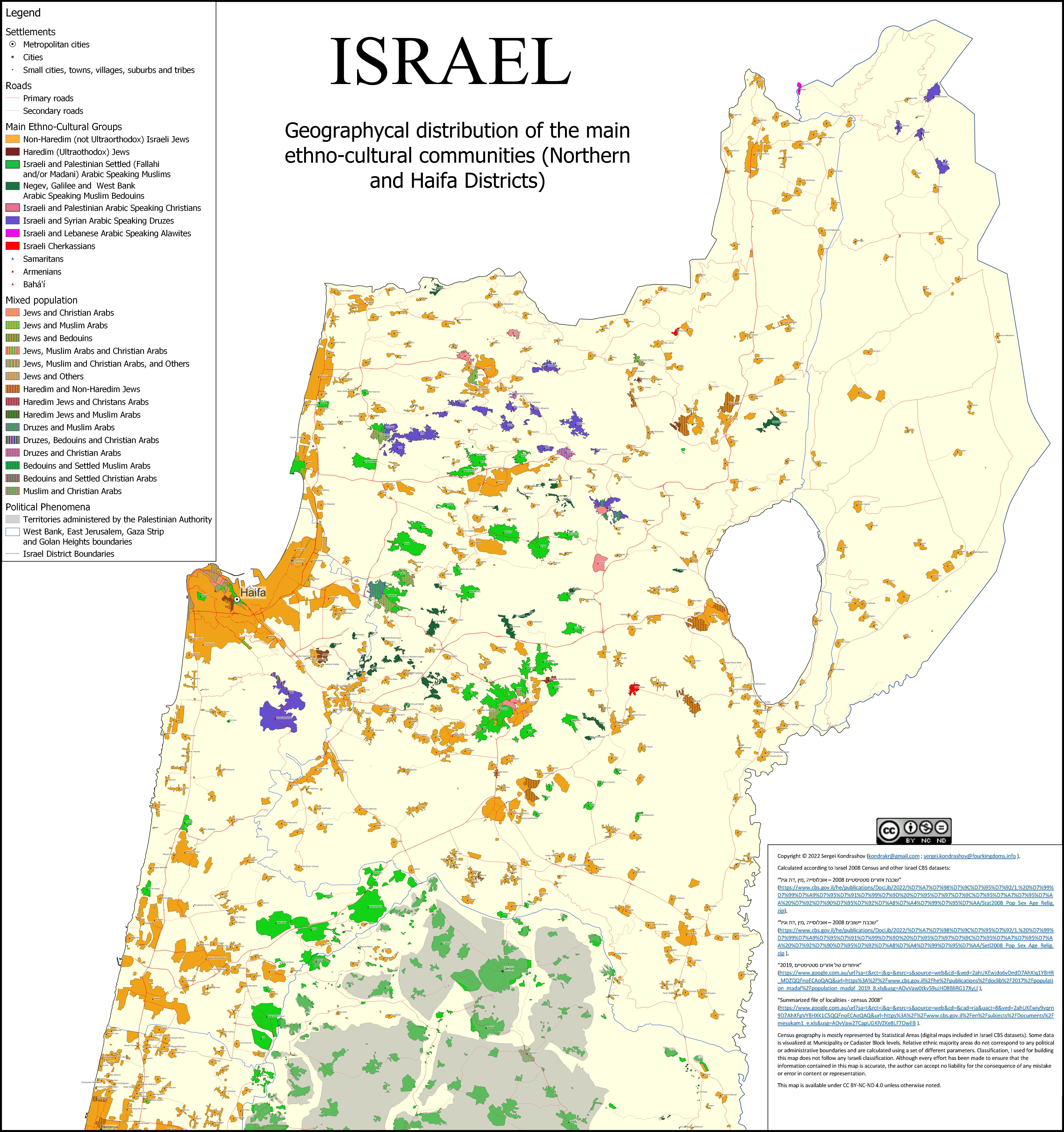
Geographical distribution of the main ethno-cultural communities Haifa and Northern districts

== See also ==
- Arameans in Israel
- Assyrians in Israel
- Christian Zionism
  - Blackstone Memorial (1891)
  - Day of Prayer for the Peace of Jerusalem (2004)
  - Jerusalem Declaration on Christian Zionism (2006)
- Christianity and Judaism
- Christianity in the Middle East
  - Palestinian Christians
  - Persecution of Christians in the Middle East
- Ethical monotheism
- Ger toshav
- Groups claiming affiliation with Israelites
- Israeli citizenship law
- Jewish Christianity
  - Judaizers
  - Judeo-Christian
  - Messianic Jews
  - Subbotniks
- Relations between Judaism and Christianity
  - British Israelism
  - Catholic Church and Judaism
  - Christian Zionism
  - Eastern Orthodoxy and Judaism
  - Jewish views on Jesus
    - Jesus in the Talmud
    - Rejection of Jesus
  - Protestantism and Judaism
- Righteous among the Nations
- Religion in Israel § Christianity
- Religion in the Middle East § Christianity
- Sons of Noah
- List of church buildings in Jerusalem
- Violence against Christians in Israel

== Bibliography ==
Printed sources

- Barnett, Paul (2002). Jesus, the Rise of Early Christianity: A History of New Testament Times. InterVarsity Press. ISBN 0-8308-2699-8.
- Berard, Wayne Daniel (2006), When Christians Were Jews (That Is, Now), Cowley Publications, ISBN 1-56101-280-7
- Bermejo-Rubio, Fernando (2017). Feldt, Laura; Valk, Ülo (eds.). "The Process of Jesus' Deification and Cognitive Dissonance Theory". Numen. 64 (2–3). Leiden: Brill Publishers: 119–152. doi:10.1163/15685276-12341457. eISSN 1568-5276. ISSN 0029-5973. JSTOR 44505332. S2CID 148616605.
- Bird, Michael F. (2017), Jesus the Eternal Son: Answering Adoptionist Christology, Wim. B. Eerdmans Publishing
- Boatwright, Mary Taliaferro; Gargola, Daniel J.; Talbert, Richard John Alexander (2004), The Romans: From Village to Empire, Oxford University Press, ISBN 0-19-511875-8
- Bokenkotter, Thomas (2004), A Concise History of the Catholic Church (Revised and expanded ed.), Doubleday, ISBN 0-385-50584-1
- Bokenkotter, Thomas (2007). A Concise History of the Catholic Church (Rev. ed.). New York: Crown. ISBN 978-0-307-42348-1.
- Brown, Schuyler. The Origins of Christianity: A Historical Introduction to the New Testament. Oxford University Press (1993). ISBN 0-19-826207-8
- Boyarin, Daniel (2012). The Jewish Gospels: the Story of the Jewish Christ. The New Press. ISBN 978-1-59558-878-4.
- Bundy, David (2007). "Early Asian and East African Christianities". In Casiday, Augustine; Norris, Frederick W. (eds.). The Cambridge History of Christianity. Cambridge University Press. pp. 118–148. doi:10.1017/CHOL9780521812443. ISBN 978-1-139-05413-3.
- Burkett, Delbert (2002), An Introduction to the New Testament and the Origins of Christianity, Cambridge University Press, ISBN 978-0-521-00720-7
- Casiday, Augustine; Norris, Frederick W. (2007). "Introduction". In Casiday, Augustine; Norris, Frederick W. (eds.). The Cambridge History of Christianity. Vol. 2. Cambridge University Press. ISBN 978-1-139-05413-3.
- Cohen, Shaye J.D. (1987), From the Maccabees to the Mishnah, The Westminster Press, ISBN 0-664-25017-3
- Cox, Steven L.; Easley, Kendell H. (2007), Harmony of the Gospels, ISBN 978-0-8054-9444-0
- Croix, G. E. M. de Sainte (1963). "Why Were The Early Christians Persecuted?". Past and Present (26): 6–38. doi:10.1093/past/26.1.6.
- Croix, G. E. M. de Sainte (2006), Whitby, Michael (ed.), Christian Persecution, Martyrdom, And Orthodoxy, Oxford: Oxford University Press, ISBN 0-19-927812-1
- Cross, F. L.; Livingstone, E. A., eds. (2005), The Oxford Dictionary of the Christian Church (3rd Revised ed.), Oxford: Oxford University Press, doi:10.1093/acref/9780192802903.001.0001, ISBN 978-0-19-280290-3
- Cullmann, Oscar (1949), The Earliest Christian Confessions, translated by J. K. S. Reid, London: Lutterworth
- Cullmann, Oscar (1966), A. J. B. Higgins (ed.), The Early Church: Studies in Early Christian History and Theology, Philadelphia: Westminster
- Cwiekowski, Frederick J. (1988), The Beginnings of the Church, Paulist Press
- Dauphin, C. (1993), "De l'Église de la circoncision à l'Église de la gentilité – sur une nouvelle voie hors de l'impasse", Studium Biblicum Franciscanum. Liber Annuus XLIII, archived from the original on 2013-03-09
- Davidson, Ivor (2005), The Birth of the Church: From Jesus to Constantine, AD 30-312, Oxford
- Davies, W. D. (1965), Paul and Rabbinic Judaism (2nd ed.), London
- Draper, JA (2006). "The Apostolic Fathers: the Didache". The Expository Times. Vol. 117, no. 5.
- Dunn, James D. G. (1982), The New Perspective on Paul. Manson Memorial Lecture, 4 november 1982
- Dunn, James D. G. (1999), Jews and Christians: The Parting of the Ways, AD 70 to 135, Wm. B. Eerdmans Publishing, ISBN 0-8028-4498-7
- Dunn, James D. G. "The Canon Debate". In McDonald & Sanders (2002).
- Dunn, James D. G. (2005), Christianity in the Making: Jesus Remembered, vol. 1, Wm. B. Eerdmans Publishing, ISBN 978-0-8028-3931-2
- Dunn, James D. G. (2009), Christianity in the Making: Beginning from Jerusalem, vol. 2, Wm. B. Eerdmans Publishing, ISBN 978-0-8028-3932-9
- Dunn, James D. G. (Autumn 1993). "Echoes of Intra-Jewish Polemic in Paul's Letter to the Galatians". Journal of Biblical Literature. 112 (3). Society of Biblical Literature: 459–77. doi:10.2307/3267745. JSTOR 3267745.
- Eddy, Paul Rhodes; Boyd, Gregory A. (2007), The Jesus Legend: A Case for the Historical Reliability of the Synoptic Jesus Tradition, Baker Academic, ISBN 978-0-8010-3114-4
- Ehrman, Bart D. (2003), Lost Christianities: The Battles for Scripture and the Faiths We Never Knew, Oxford: Oxford University Press, ISBN 978-0-19-972712-4, LCCN 2003053097
- Ehrman, Bart D. (2005) [2003]. "At Polar Ends of the Spectrum: Early Christian Ebionites and Marcionites". Lost Christianities: The Battles for Scripture and the Faiths We Never Knew. Oxford: Oxford University Press. pp. 95–112. ISBN 978-0-19-518249-1.
- Ehrman, Bart (2012), Did Jesus Exist?: The Historical Argument for Jesus of Nazareth, Harper Collins, ISBN 978-0-06-208994-6
- Ehrman, Bart (2014), How Jesus became God: The Exaltation of a Jewish Preacher from Galilee, Harper Collins
- Elwell, Walter; Comfort, Philip Wesley (2001), Tyndale Bible Dictionary, Tyndale House Publishers, ISBN 0-8423-7089-7
- Esler, Philip F. (2004), The Early Christian World, Routledge, ISBN 0-415-33312-1
- Finlan, Stephen (2004), The Background and Content of Paul's Cultic Atonement Metaphors, Society of Biblical Literature
- Fousek, Jan; Kaše, Vojtěch; Mertel, Adam; Výtvarová, Eva; Chalupa, Aleš (26 December 2018). "Spatial constraints on the diffusion of religious innovations: The case of early Christianity in the Roman Empire". PLOS One. 13 (12) e0208744. Bibcode:2018PLoSO..1308744F. doi:10.1371/journal.pone.0208744. PMC 6306252. PMID 30586375.
- Franzen, August (1988), Kirchengeschichte
- Frassetto, Michael (2007). Heretic Lives: Medieval Heresy from Bogomil and the Cathars to Wyclif and Hus. London: Profile Books. pp. 7–198. ISBN 978-1-86197-744-1. OCLC 666953429.
- Fredriksen, Paula (2018), When Christians Were Jews: The First Generation, New Haven and London: Yale University Press, ISBN 978-0-300-19051-9
- González, Justo L. (1987). A History of Christian Thought. Vol. 1: From the Beginnings to the Council of Chalcedon (revised ed.). Abingdon Press. ISBN 0-687-17182-2.
- Grant, M. (1977), Jesus: An Historian's Review of the Gospels, New York: Scribner's
- Gundry, R.H. (1976), Soma in Biblical Theology, Cambridge: Cambridge University Press
- Harnett, Benjamin (2017). "The Diffusion of the Codex". Classical Antiquity. 36 (2). University of California Press: 183–235. doi:10.1525/ca.2017.36.2.183. JSTOR 26362608.
- Hopkins, Keith (1998). "Christian Number and Its Implications". Journal of Early Christian Studies. 6 (2): 185–226. doi:10.1353/earl.1998.0035. S2CID 170769034.
- Humfress, Caroline (2013). "5: Laws' Empire: Roman Universalism and Legal Practice". New Frontiers: Law and Society in the Roman World. Edinburgh University Press. ISBN 978-0-7486-6817-5.
- Hunter, Archibald (1973), Works and Words of Jesus
- Hurtado, Larry W. (2004), Lord Jesus Christ: Devotion to Jesus in Earliest Christianity, Grand Rapids, Michigan and Cambridge, U.K.: Wm. B. Eerdmans, ISBN 978-0-8028-3167-5
- Hurtado, Larry W. (2005), How on Earth Did Jesus Become a God? Historical Questions about Earliest Devotion to Jesus, Grand Rapids, Michigan and Cambridge, U.K.: Wm. B. Eerdmans, ISBN 978-0-8028-2861-3
- Johnson, L.T., The Real Jesus, San Francisco, Harper San Francisco, 1996
- Keck, Leander E. (1988), Paul and His Letters, Fortress Press, ISBN 0-8006-2340-1
- Komarnitsky, Kris (2014), "Cognitive Dissonance and the Resurrection of Jesus", Fourth R Magazine, 27 (5)
- Kremer, Jakob (1977), Die Osterevangelien – Geschichten um Geschichte, Stuttgart: Katholisches Bibelwerk
- Lawrence, Arren Bennet (2017), Comparative Characterization in the Sermon on the Mount: Characterization of the Ideal Disciple, Wipf and Stock Publishers
- Loke, Andrew Ter Ern (2017), The Origin of Divine Christology, vol. 169, Cambridge University Press, ISBN 978-1-108-19142-5
- Ludemann, Gerd, What Really Happened to Jesus? trans. J. Bowden, Louisville, Kentucky: Westminster John Knox Press, 1995
- Lüdemann, Gerd; Özen, Alf (1996), De opstanding van Jezus. Een historische benadering (Was mit Jesus wirklich geschah. Die Auferstehung historisch betrachtet), The Have/Averbode
- MacCulloch, Diarmaid (2010). Christianity: The First Three Thousand Years. Penguin Books. ISBN 978-1-101-18999-3.
- Mack, Burton L. (1995), Who wrote the New Testament? The making of the Christian myth, Harper San Francisco, ISBN 978-0-06-065517-4
- Mack, Burton L. (1997) [1995], Wie schreven het Nieuwe Testament werkelijk? Feiten, mythen en motieven. (Who Wrote the New Testament? The Making of the Christian Myth), Uitgeverij Ankh-Hermes bv
- Maier, P. L. (1975), "The Empty Tomb as History", Christianity Today
- McDonald, L. M.; Sanders, J. A., eds. (2002), The Canon Debate, Hendrickson
- McGrath, Alister E. (2006), Christianity: An Introduction, Wiley-Blackwell, ISBN 1-4051-0899-1
- Milavec, Aaron (2003). The Didache: Faith, Hope, & Life of the Earliest Christian Communities, 50-70 C.E. Newman Press. ISBN 978-0-8091-0537-3.
- Moss, Candida (2012). "Current Trends in the Study of Early Christian Martyrdom". Bulletin for the Study of Religion. 41 (3): 22–29. doi:10.1558/bsor.v41i3.22. Archived from the original on 25 February 2014.
- Netland, Harold (2001), Encountering Religious Pluralism: The Challenge to Christian Faith & Mission, InterVarsity Press
- Neufeld (1964), The Earliest Christian Confessions, Grand Rapids: Eerdmans
- O'Collins, Gerald (1978), What are They Saying About the Resurrection?, New York: Paulist Press
- Pagels, Elaine (2005), De Gnostische Evangelien (The Gnostic Gospels), Servire
- Pannenberg, Wolfhart (1968), Jesus – God and Man, translated by Lewis Wilkins; Duane Pribe, Philadelphia: Westminster
- Pao, David W. (2016), Acts and the Isaianic New Exodus, Wipf and Stock Publishers
- Redford, Douglas (2007), The Life and Ministry of Jesus: The Gospels, Standard, ISBN 978-0-7847-1900-8
- Robert, Dana L. (2009). Christian Mission: How Christianity Became a World Religion (Illustrated ed.). John Wiley & Sons. ISBN 978-0-631-23619-1.
- Rowland, Christopher (1985). Christian Origins: An Account of the Setting and Character of the Most Important Messianic Sect of Judaism. SPCK. ISBN 978-0-281-04110-7.
- Schwartz, Seth (9 February 2009). Imperialism and Jewish Society: 200 B.C.E. to 640 C.E. Princeton University Press. ISBN 978-1-4008-2485-4.
- Smith, J. L. (September 1969). "Resurrection Faith Today" (PDF). Theological Studies. 30 (3): 393–419. doi:10.1177/004056396903000301. S2CID 170845348. Archived from the original (PDF) on 1 October 2022.
- Stendahl, Krister (July 1963). "The Apostle Paul and the Introspective Conscience of the West" (PDF). Harvard Theological Review. 56 (3). Cambridge: Cambridge University Press on behalf of the Harvard Divinity School: 199–215. doi:10.1017/S0017816000024779. ISSN 1475-4517. JSTOR 1508631. LCCN 09003793. OCLC 803348474. S2CID 170331485. Archived (PDF) from the original on 24 December 2021.
- Tabor, James D. (1998), "Ancient Judaism: Nazarenes and Ebionites", The Jewish Roman World of Jesus, Department of Religious Studies at the University of North Carolina at Charlotte
- Talbert, Charles H. (2011), The Development of Christology during the First Hundred Years: and Other Essays on Early Christian Christology. Supplements to Novum Testamentum 140., Leiden: Brill Publishers
- Wilken, Robert Louis (2013). The First Thousand Years: A Global History of Christianity. New Haven and London: Yale University Press. ISBN 978-0-300-11884-1. JSTOR j.ctt32bd7m.5. LCCN 2012021755. S2CID 160590164.
- Wilckens, Ulrich (1970), Auferstehung, Stuttgart and Berlin: Kreuz Verlag
- Wright, N.T. (1992), The New Testament and the People of God, Fortress Press, ISBN 0-8006-2681-8
- Wylen, Stephen M. (1995), The Jews in the Time of Jesus: An Introduction, Paulist Press, ISBN 0-8091-3610-4
