= Coptic Church of the Annunciation =

Coordinates: 32.7047°N 35.3022°E

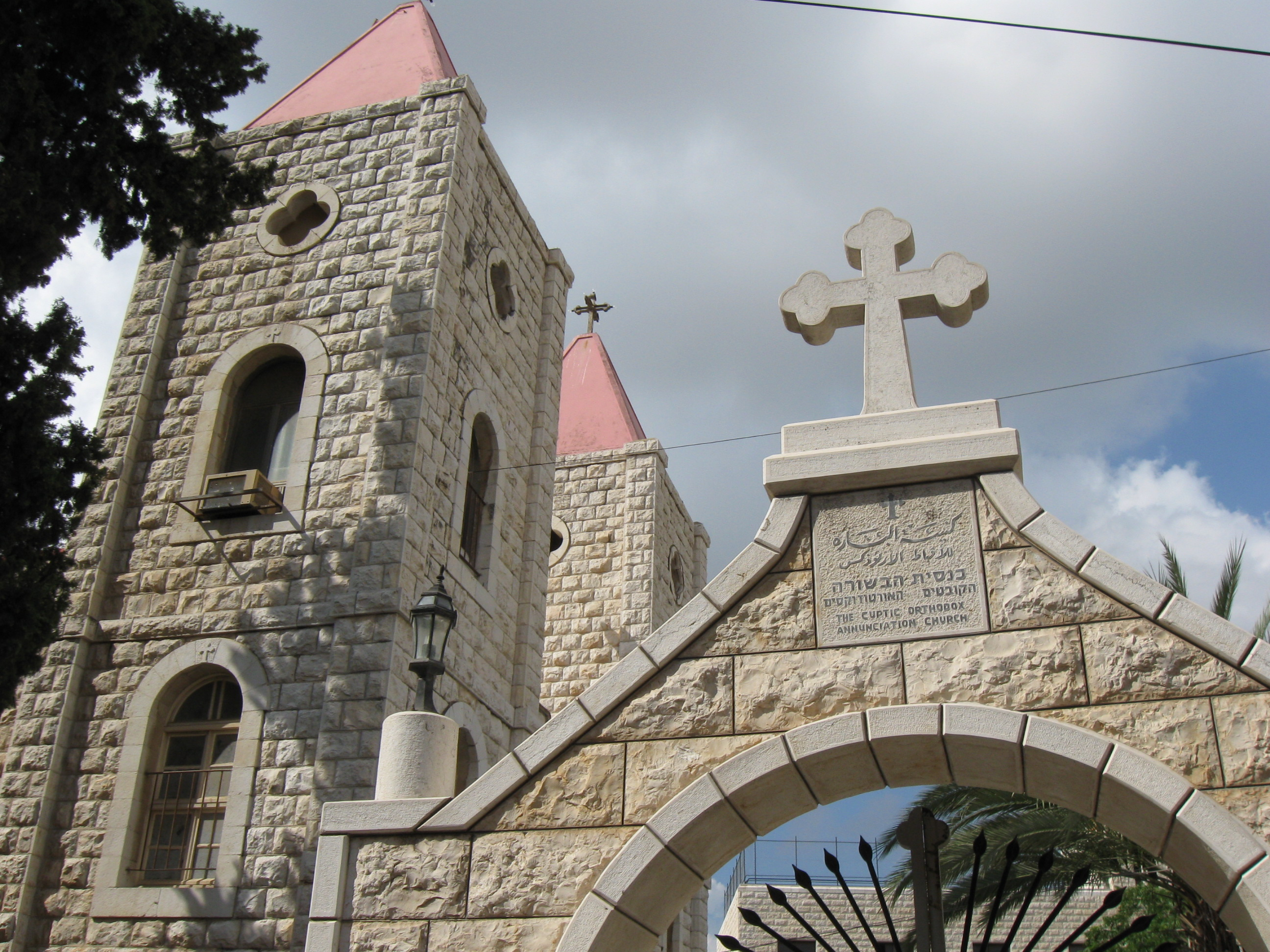
- Coptic Church of the Annunciation
- Location: Nazareth
- Country: Israel
- Denomination: Coptic Church

The Coptic Church of the Annunciation is a Coptic church in the city of Nazareth, in northern Israel. It is dedicated to the Annunciation; it is not to be confused with the Catholic church of the same name (Basilica of the Annunciation) or the Maronite church in the same city.

The Coptic community came to Nazareth late nineteenth century. The Church of the Annunciation was built in 1952 on the initiative of then Patriarch Basil. All construction work has been done voluntarily by members of the local Coptic community.

The church is surrounded by a stone wall with a door that allows entry into the inner courtyard. Above the door is a crucifix. The temple is a two-story building. The façade has on its sides two square towers (three floors) with red roofs.

Visiting the church is possible with an appointment.

== See also ==
- Christianity in Israel
- Basilica of the Annunciation

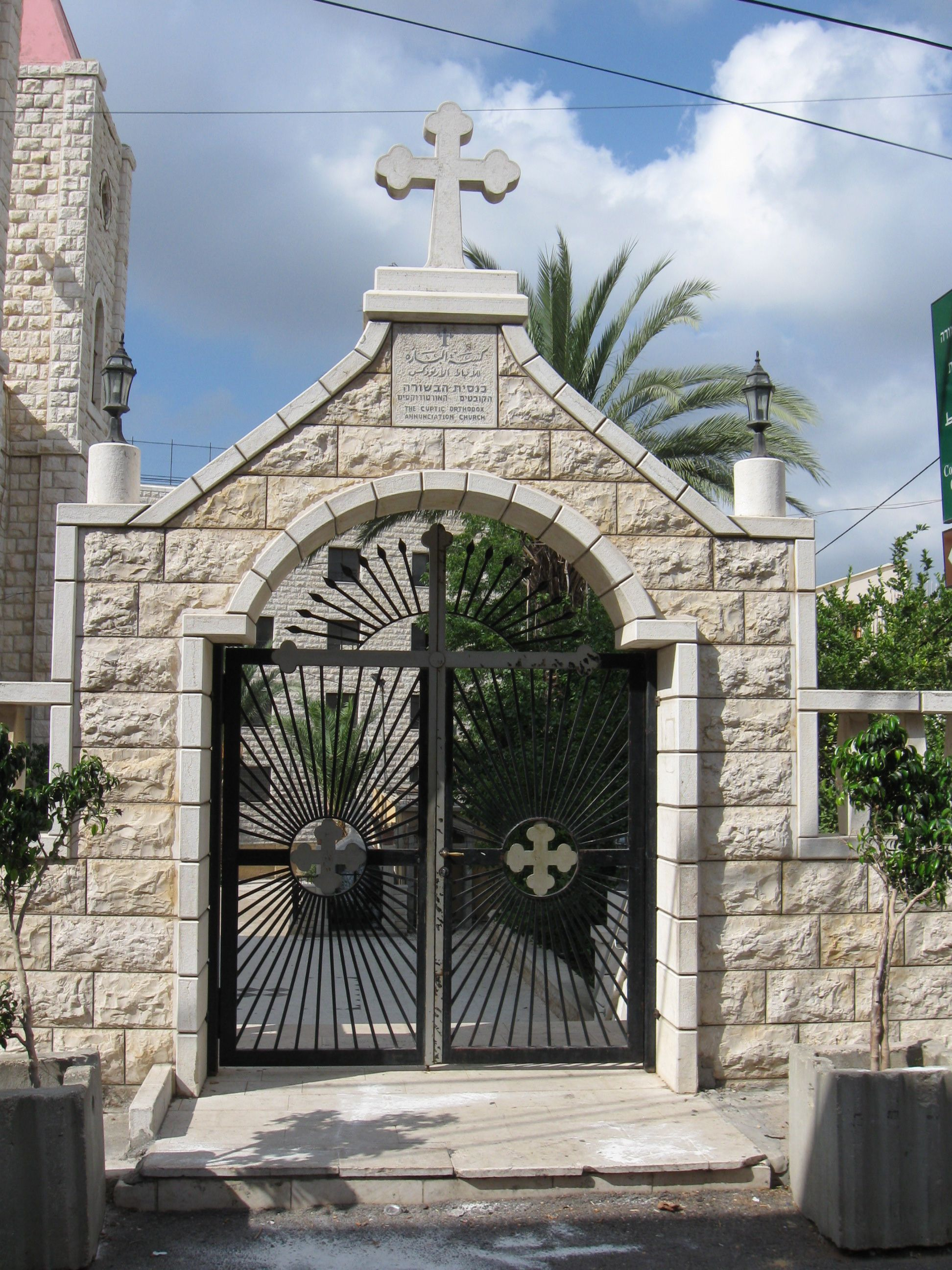
Temple entrance
