= Violence against Christians in Israel =

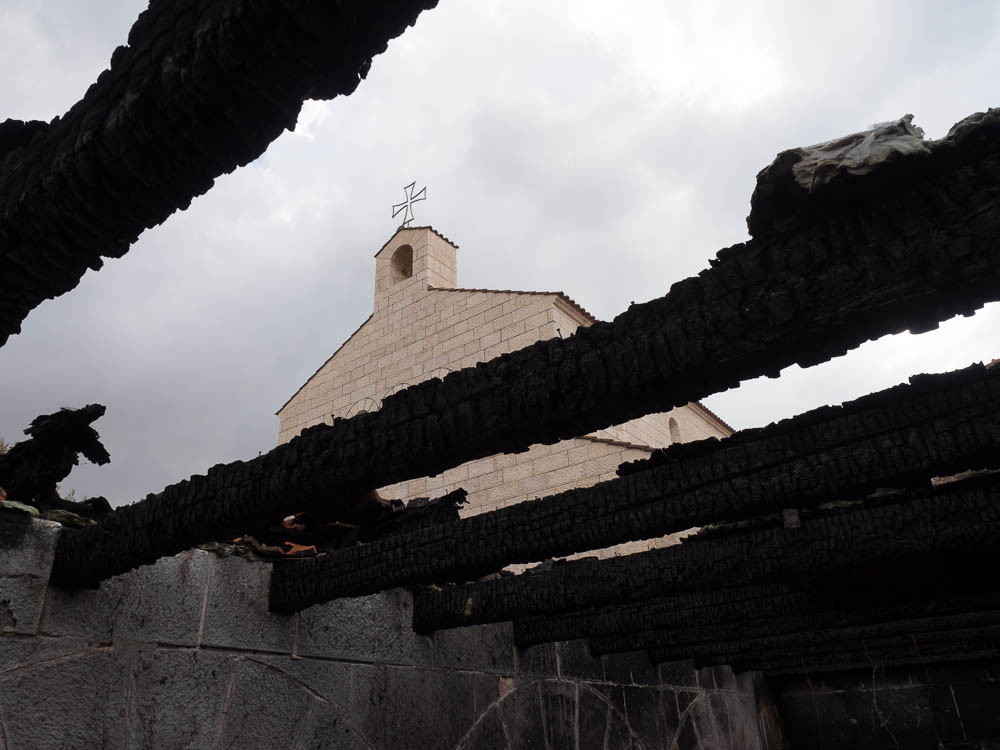
Church of the Multiplication in Tabgha as seen through the burnt roof of an auxiliary building next to the church.

Christians in Israel have been subjected to religious violence. In its 2024 report, the Rossing Center for Education and Dialogue identified that most attacks come from young ultra-Orthodox Jews, "belonging to circles of religious-nationalist extremism." Approximately 80% of Christians residing in Israeli territory (around 180,000 people) are of Arab origin, representing 7% of the total Arab population in the country. Acts of violence, particularly in the city of Jerusalem, include frequent episodes of verbal and physical aggression (including spitting and stone-throwing), vandalism against churches, cemeteries, and Christian property. When perpetrators are arrested, Israeli authorities often claim that they are mentally ill, absolving them of any responsibility.

In 2018, the leaders of the Catholic, Greek Orthodox, and Armenian churches in Jerusalem made a joint statement in front of the Church of the Holy Sepulchre, in which they denounced a "systematic campaign against the churches and the Christian community in the Holy Land" by the Jerusalem municipality.

== Context of the violence ==
Although attacks against Christians that occurred after the founding of Israel are not new, they have grown considerably since the Gaza war and the rise to power of the political group led by Benjamin Netanyahu, the most right-wing and religiously fundamentalist in Israel's history.

In 2024, the Rossing Center recorded a total of 111 acts of violence against Christians (compared to 94 in 2023), "including but not limited to attacks against clergy." Although most attacks were directed at individuals, "35 cases involved vandalism against churches, monasteries, and public religious signs."

Regarding 2025, the Rossing Center recorded 155 cases of violence against Christians, an increase of more than 40% compared to 2024. However, there was no mention of restrictions on religious freedom.

The growing influence of religious nationalist extremism on the Israeli government has created an environment of "threat for religious minorities, and particularly for Christians." In light of this reality, a survey conducted by the Rossing Center found that 48% of Israeli Christians under the age of 30 said they were considering leaving the region permanently and emigrating. Among these, 77% stated that the main reason for their decision was precisely the "escalating discrimination and violence suffered by Christians," as well as the "overall deterioration of the socio-political situation."

=== Statistics ===
According to information released by the Israel Central Bureau of Statistics, as of December 31, 2024, the population of Israel was 10.027 million residents, of which 7.707 million (76.9%) were Jewish and 2.104 million (21%) were of Arab origin. Of the remaining 0.216 million (2.1%), Christians are the largest minority, with approximately 180,300 individuals (1.8% of the Israeli population), of whom 78.8% are of Arab origin, constituting 6.9% of Israel's Arab population.

=== Legal framework ===
Israel does not have a constitution; legal principles are ensured through Basic Laws. However, the Declaration of Independence defines the character of the State. According to this, Israel would guarantee:

(...) complete equality of social and political rights to all its inhabitants irrespective of religion, race or sex; it will guarantee freedom of religion, conscience, language, education and culture; it will safeguard the Holy Places of all religions; and it will be faithful to the principles of the Charter of the United Nations."

A 1992 Basic Law, "Human Dignity and Liberty," addresses the protection of human rights and describes Israel as a "Jewish and democratic" state. But in 2018, another Basic Law was passed, "Israel: The Nation-State of the Jewish People," which states that:

The Land of Israel is the historical homeland of the Jewish people(...); the State of Israel is the nation-state of the Jewish People, in which it realizes its natural, cultural, religious and historical right to self-determination; the realization of the right to national self-determination in the State of Israel is exclusive to the Jewish People.

This law, as religious leaders pointed out at the time, provided a "legal and constitutional basis for discrimination" against minorities, "undermining the ideals of equality, justice, and democracy." As Patriarch Theophilus III emphasized, "this reminds us of laws of a similar nature that were enacted against the Jews during dark periods in Europe."

=== Political developments ===
The unfolding of the Gaza war throughout 2024 and 2025 directly affected Christian communities in Israel in general and in Jerusalem in particular, as they depend on the influx of tourists driven away by the war. Political polarization, exacerbated by the conflict, and the increase in crime (and murders) in Arab communities, also jeopardized the existence of Christians in such environments. Faced with such challenges, inaction or omission on the part of the Israeli authorities became noticeable, often citing a lack of police personnel as a reason to avoid getting involved in disputes.

Of all the Christian groups threatened in Israeli territory, one of the smallest, and certainly the one facing the greatest risk of physical elimination, was the one in Gaza. The Rossing Center's reports do not include them, as it is a war zone.

==== Proselytization ====
Missionary activity is not prohibited in Israel (provided that proselytizing is limited to those over 18 years of age and that no financial incentives are offered for conversion), and religious communities and their places of worship are exempt from paying taxes. However, this exemption does not cover religious properties used for other purposes, such as schools, hostels, or hospitals: these may be subject to fees imposed by municipalities (called "Arnona"), as has been the case since 2024 in Jerusalem, Tel Aviv, Ramla, and Haifa. In 2023, a bill was introduced and withdrawn in the Knesset to make proselytization punishable with incarceration. Attacks against those who are perceived to be engaged in Christian proselytization have increased.

== Attacks by type ==
=== Harassment ===
Includes verbal harassment, attacks and protests during Christian gatherings, anti-Christian propaganda.

2023	2024	2025
11	13	28

=== Aggressions ===
Include spitting, use of pepper spray, physical assault.

2023	2024	2025
37	46	61

=== Vandalism ===
This includes graffiti, trespassing, damage to statues, throwing stones and garbage on Church properties, arson, and defacement of public signs.

2023	2024	2025
41	49	52

=== Violations of Freedom of Religion or Belief ===
Includes requests to remove religious symbols, limitations on access to religious sites, restrictions in freedom of movement to participate in religious services, etc.

2023	2024
5	3

== See also ==
- Christianity in Israel
