= The Israel-Kurdistan Friendship League =

Association in Israel

A newsletter entitled "Yedidut" (Hebrew, Friendship) edited in 1993 in Jerusalem, as one of the first steps of the newly established "Israeli-Kurdistan Friendship League", to send the message across to the Kurdish people in Kurdistan and the diaspora.

The Israel-Kurdistan Friendship League is a friendship association between Jews and Israelis and Muslim community

== History ==
The Israel-Kurdistan Friendship League was established in 1994 in Jerusalem, by several Israeli and Jewish activists of Kurdish origin or interest. The founder was Mordechai Zaken and the main activists who worked together were the late Moshe Zaken, a business man from Jerusalem, Meir Baruch, a retired military person, Michael Niebur who spent some time in NGOs helping the Kurds, and Mathew B. Hand an American who promoted activity of coexistence with Muslims. The response of Kurdish representatives and organizations both in Kurdistan and the diaspora was enthusiastic as can be judged from hundreds of letters, phone calls and also email received in Jerusalem within short time after the announcement of its founding in the world press and in The Voice of America in the Kurdish language, which conducted interviews with the founder, Mordechai Zaken. The League also published a newsletter called yedidut (heb., friendship) carrying the message of Israeli and Jewish friendship to Kurds worldwide.
