= Ihud Bnei HaBrit =

Israeli political party

Ihud Bnei HaBrit איחוד בני הברית
- Leader: Bishara Shilyan
- Founded: 10 July 2013 (nonprofit); 8 February 2019 (party)
- Ideology: Arab Christian interests Two-state solution
- Political position: Centre-right
- Knesset: 0 / 120

Election symbol
- ינ ر ف

Ihud Bnei HaBrit (Hebrew: איחוד בני הברית; Arabic: اتحاد أبناء العهد; English: United Allies) is an Israeli political party that participated in the April 2019 Israeli legislative election. It is mostly an Arab Christian party, with some Jewish and Muslim support.

For the September 2019 Israeli legislative election, the party changed its name to Hatnuah Hanotzrit Haliberalit (Hebrew: התנועה הנוצרית הליברלית; Arabic: الحركة المسيحية الليبرالية; English: Liberal Christian Movement). For the 2021 Israeli legislative election, the party changed its name to "ברית השותפות לאיחוד לאומי" (United Alliance).

== History ==
Bnei Brit HaHadasha ("Sons of the New Testament"), soon changed to Bnei Brit ("Allies"), was established in 2013 with the aim of representing the interests of Arab Christians in Israel. The party encourages full integration of Arab Christians into Israeli society, the two-state solution, and enlistment of Arab speaking Christians into the Israel Defense Forces. It was founded by Bishara Shilyan, a sea captain from Nazareth, and one of the founders of the Christian Enlistment Forum and a central promoter of recruitment of Christians into the Israel Defense Forces. Israel's Arab Christians are predominantly Melkite Greek and Roman Catholic and represent a minority within the broader Arab population of the country.

The party's founder, Bishara Shilyan, said he wants to build a 30.5-metre (100 ft) tall statue of Jesus (modelled on Rio de Janeiro's Christ the Redeemer statue) on top of a mountain in Nazareth. He said the purpose of the statue would be to prevent Nazareth's Christian heritage from being eroded. The town's Christian population has been steadily decreasing relative to its Muslim population, with Christian residents leaving to the predominately Jewish cities of Nazareth Illit, Shfar'am, and Haifa.

The list was officially submitted in the April 2019 Israeli legislative election as Ihud Bnei HaBrit ("United Allies"). The party aims to promote equality between majority and minorities in Israel, in the spirit of the Israeli Declaration of Independence. In its TV broadcast, Shilyan promised to make Israel into a maritime powerhouse in a joined Christian–Jewish effort.

The party participated in the September 2019 Israeli legislative election under the new name Christian Liberal Movement, with the same leader.

== See also ==
- List of political parties in Israel
- Christianity in Israel
- Politics of Israel
