= Mordechai Zaken =

Israeli scholar, linguist, and author (1958–2021)

- מוטי/מרדכי זקן
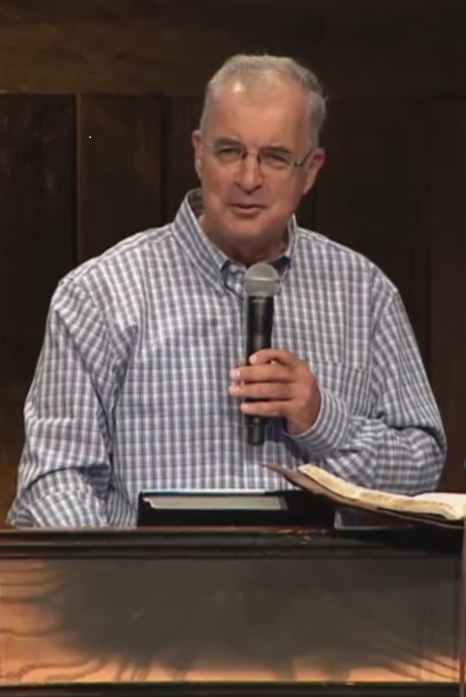
- Born: April 26, 1958
- Died: May 14, 2021 (aged 63)
- Other names: Moti Zaken
- Education: PhD, 2003
- Alma mater: Hebrew University of Jerusalem
- Occupations: Advisor to the Prime Minister on Arab & Minority Affairs
- Years active: May 1997 – November 1999
- Employer: Israel
- Organization: The Israel-Kurdistan Friendship League

Mordechai Zaken also Moti Zaken (Hebrew: מוטי/מרדכי זקן; Arabic: مردخاي زاكين) (April 26, 1958 – May 14, 2021) was a historian and the 2019 laureate of "the Prime Minister Prize for the research of the Jews of the Orient." He was an expert on the Kurds and Middle Eastern minorities both as academic – he was historian of the Jews, the Kurds in Kurdistan and as professional - serving as the advisor on Israeli Arabs and minorities to the prime minister, Benjamin Netanyahu (1997–1999), and to the Ministry of Public Security from 2001.

== Education, expertise, prizes ==
Zaken earned his BA, MA, cum laude, and PhD (2003) in Islamic Studies at the Hebrew University of Jerusalem. He studied as well in the US in both SUNY Binghamton and New York University (1987-1990). Among his influential teachers were Moshe Sharon, Benjamin Z. Kedar and the late semitic linguist Gideon Goldenberg, with whom he published the Book of Ruth in Neo-Aramaic. He published another Neo-Aramaic text in a book honoring Goldenberg's jubilee.

On 6 March 2019, he was announced as the laureate of "the Prime Minister Prize for the Empowerment of the research of the Jews of the Orient and Iran."

== New oral history documentation on the Jews of Kurdistan ==
The severe dearth of written sources on Kurdistan, drove him as a student to embark on oral history fieldwork research, conducting altogether hundreds of in-depth oral interviews with more than sixty elderly Jewish Kurdish informants, whose excellent memory was the product of oral culture. He thus saved their memories from being lost forever. This study forms a new set of historical records. His book on the Jews and the tribal Kurdish society has received wide attention and commended even in its Arabic translation, published in Beirut, as an "innovation," and has been translated as well into Kurdish, in both Sorani and Kurmanji, Persian and French.

== Prime Minister's Advisor on Arabs & Minorities Affairs ==
=== Expertise in the Arab Minorities in Israel ===
As advisor to the Prime Minister on Arab affairs at the Prime Minister ministry (May 1997 – November 1999) he was engaged in the complex relations between the government and the communities of minorities. In 2016, within the Public Security Ministry, he formed a new governmental forum for dialogue with local Arab leaders.

=== Forming the Government-Christian Forum ===
As an advisor on minorities to both the prime minister and the ministry of Public Security he has been standing up against hate crimes.

In 2013 he initiated with Christian leaders the Government – Christians Forum that addresses the concerns of the Evangelical Christian community vis a vis the government. Two prominent Christian leaders in this forum have been Rev. Kopp, of the Baptist Church and Rev. David Pillegi, Rector of the Christ Church in Jaffa Gate.

=== Founding the Israeli-Kurdistan Friendship league ===
A newsletter entitled "Yedidut" (Hebrew, Friendship) edited in 1993 in Jerusalem, as one of the first steps of the newly established "Israeli-Kurdistan Friendship League", to send the message across to the Kurdish people in Kurdistan and the diaspora.

In 1993, he founded the Israeli-Kurdistan Friendship League, possibly the first friendship association between Jews and any community in the Arab states, together with Moshe Zaken and Meir Baruch, Michael Niebur and Mathew B. Hand, the last two with whom he edited the newsletter Yedidut.

In October 2012 he visited Kurdistan at the invitation of the World Kurdish Forum and in October 2013 participated in, and delivered a presentation for this forum that was held in Stockholm, Sweden.

=== The dispute between Muslims and Christians in Nazareth ===
He was the coordinator of the third Ministerial Committee set to resolve the dispute between Muslims and Christians in Nazareth regarding a dispute near the Basilica of the Annunciation, a dispute that concerned leaders throughout the world, such as the US president George W. Bush and the Pope John Paul. The daily presence of Muslim activists in the plaza near the old mosque, known as "Shihab al-Din," became an obstacle for the plan to build an open plaza for the historical visit of the Pope John Paul II in the year 2000. He constructed the final draft for the cabinet resolution, which was used by the State Attorney in the Supreme Court to repel the appeal against the government, in the years 2001–2003.

== Director of the Institute of Students and Faculty on Israel, in New York ==
Zaken served as the last National Director of ISFI, or "The Institute of Students and Faculty on Israel," in New York, an organization under the auspices of the Israeli Foreign Ministry and the Israeli Consulate in New York City (1989–1991). ISFI provided political and cultural resources, ideas and tools, for Jewish and pro-Israel student activists throughout the US and Canada, through which Israeli oriented activities and the message of Israel could be promoted in US campuses.

== Journalism, media and public speaking ==
In 1982, as Chief-Editor of the students' newspaper at the Hebrew University Pi-Ha'aton (פי האתון) ("The donkey's mouth", taken from the Book of Numbers, 22:28), one of his main journalistic achievements was the unearthing of an old photograph from 1948, taken by Arabs and showing mutilated faces and bodies of Jewish soldiers that were part of an army unit that later became known as "Nabi Daniel Caravan" (שיירת נבי דניאל). He published the photograph and the story behind its discovery in a special Independence Day Edition, on 26 April 1982. He was also the Co-Chief editor of "Tipul Shoresh" (Heb., root canal treatment) an annual newspaper of the public activists' program at the Hebrew University, the circulation of which was stopped by the directors and university administration, due to its critical approach towards the university policy regarding social issues. As a scholar, Zaken has been a frequent guest in radio and TV programs, speaking mostly on the Kurds and the minorities in the Middle East, and has been interviewed by newspapers as an expert on these subjects.

He also spoke in public on these topics.

== Publications ==
=== Thesis ===
- "Tribal Chieftains and their Jewish Subjects in Kurdistan: A Comparative Study in Survival," PhD dissertation, the Hebrew University of Jerusalem, 2003.

=== Books (including translations) ===
- Jews of Kurdistan & Their tribal Chieftains: A study in survival, by Mordechai (Moti) Zaken, 2nd and Revised EBook Edition, (Jerusalem:2015).
- Zaken, Mordechai (2007). Jewish Subjects and their Tribal Chieftains in Kurdistan: A Study in Survival. Jewish Identities in a Changing World. Vol. 9. Leiden and Boston: Brill. doi:10.1163/ej.9789004161900.i-376. ISBN 978-90-47-42212-9. S2CID 128667433.
- Arabic translation:Yahud Kurdistan wa-ru'as'uhum al-qabaliyun: Dirasa fi fan al-baqa' هود كردستا ورؤساؤهم القبليون: (دراسة في فن البقاء) (in Arabic). Translated by Khader, Su'ad Muhammad. Beirut: Academic Center for Research. 2013. ISBN 9789953887555.
- Sorani translation: D. Mordixai Zakin, Gulekekany Kurdistan, Sulaimaniyya and Arbil: 2015.
- Kurmanji translation of one part of the book: "Jews, Kurds and Arabs, between 1941 and 1952", by Dr. Amr Taher Ahmed Metîn n° 148, October 2006, p. 98-123.
- French translation of one part of the book: "Juifs, Kurdes et Arabes, entre 1941 et 1952," Errance et Terre promise: Juifs, Kurdes, Assyro-Chaldéens, etudes kurdes, revue semestrielle de recherches, 2005: 7-43, translated by Sandrine Alexie.

=== Selected lectures or conference participation ===
- The third World Kurdish Scientific Congress, Stockholm, October 11–13, 2013.
- The Second World Kurdish Scientific Congress, Erbil, Kurdistan, October 11–15, 2012.
- Keynote Speech; "Genocide, Minorities and Memories", Symposium and Commemoration of the Armenian genocide, Hebrew University of Jerusalem, 22 April 2012.
- Jews, Kurds and Palestinians. German Parliament of Berlin (in German). 2010-10-20.

=== Selected book chapters ===
- Gunter, M., ed. (2018). "The Jewish communities in Kurdistan within the tribal Kurdish society". Routledge Handbook on the Kurds. Routledge. pp. 181–201. doi:10.4324/9781315627427-15. ISBN 9781315627427. S2CID 164733823.
- Mizrahi, A.; Ben-David, A., eds. (2001). "The Lost from the Land of Ashur – the migrations from Kurdistan and the settlement in Eretz-Israel". The Tribes – Evidence of Israel, Exile, Immigrations, Absorption, Contribution and Integration (in Hebrew). pp. 340–373.
- Bar-Asher, M., ed. (1997). "Inventors' Fate: A Folk-Tale in the Neo-Aramaic of Zakho". Massorot: Studies in Language Traditions and Jewish Languages (in Hebrew). Vol. 9, 10, 11. Mifʻal masorot ha-lashon shel ʻedot Yiśraʼel, ha-Makhon le-madaʻe ha-Yahadut, ha-Universiṭah ha-ʻIvrit Yerushalayim. pp. 383–395.
- Goldenberg, Gideon; Zaken, Mordechai (1990). "The Book of Ruth in Neo-Aramaic". In Heinrichs, W. (ed.). Studies in Neo-Aramaic. Harvard Semitic Studies Series. Vol. 36. Atlanta, Ga.: Scholars Pr. pp. 151–157. doi:10.1163/9789004369535_012. ISBN 978-1-55540-430-7. OCLC 246312115.
