= Government - Christians Forum =

Organization established in Jerusalem in 2013

The Israeli Government - Christians Forum is an organization established in Jerusalem in 2013 by Mordechai Zaken, head of the Minorities Affairs Desk at the Ministry of Public Security, to address the concerns of Christians as a minority group.

== History ==
The decision to establish this forum followed years of informal and private discussions with activists and leaders, mainly of American and European origin, in an attempt to address their concerns vis-à-vis government agencies and ministries. Two of the prominent leaders in the side of the Christians helping in establishing this forum have been Charles (Chuck) Kopp, the prominent leader of the Baptist Church in Jerusalem and David Pillegi, Rector of the Christ Church.

On 27 September 2016, the Forum was held for the 7th time since its inauguration. The aim was to promote a new idea to appoint “trusted liaisons” to the airport authorities, in order to help reduce any potential negative experiences for Christian visitors. The meeting was attended by representatives of government ministries and more than 40 representatives of Christian groups and of NGOs. Dr. Moti Zaken the head of the Minority Affairs at the Public Security ministry concluded: "the idea promoted by us to appoint "airport trustees" by Christian groups has been received by the Airport Authority, in order to facilitate entry and exit of Christian tourists to Israel, and this is the first time that something like this is possible. This kind of initiative should not be taken lightly, it is a historic step."
