= Rosh HaNikra =

Rosh Hanikra (Hebrew: רֹאשׁ הַנִּקְרָה, lit. Head of the Grottoes) may refer to:

- Rosh HaNikra grottoes, a geographic feature in Israel; article contains the main history section regarding the cape and the Ladder of Tyre
- Rosh HaNikra (kibbutz), a kibbutz nearby
- Rosh HaNikra Crossing, a border crossing between Israel and Lebanon
- Rosh HaNikra Islands, c. 800 m offshore from the cape with the grottoes
