= Israel–Lebanon relations =

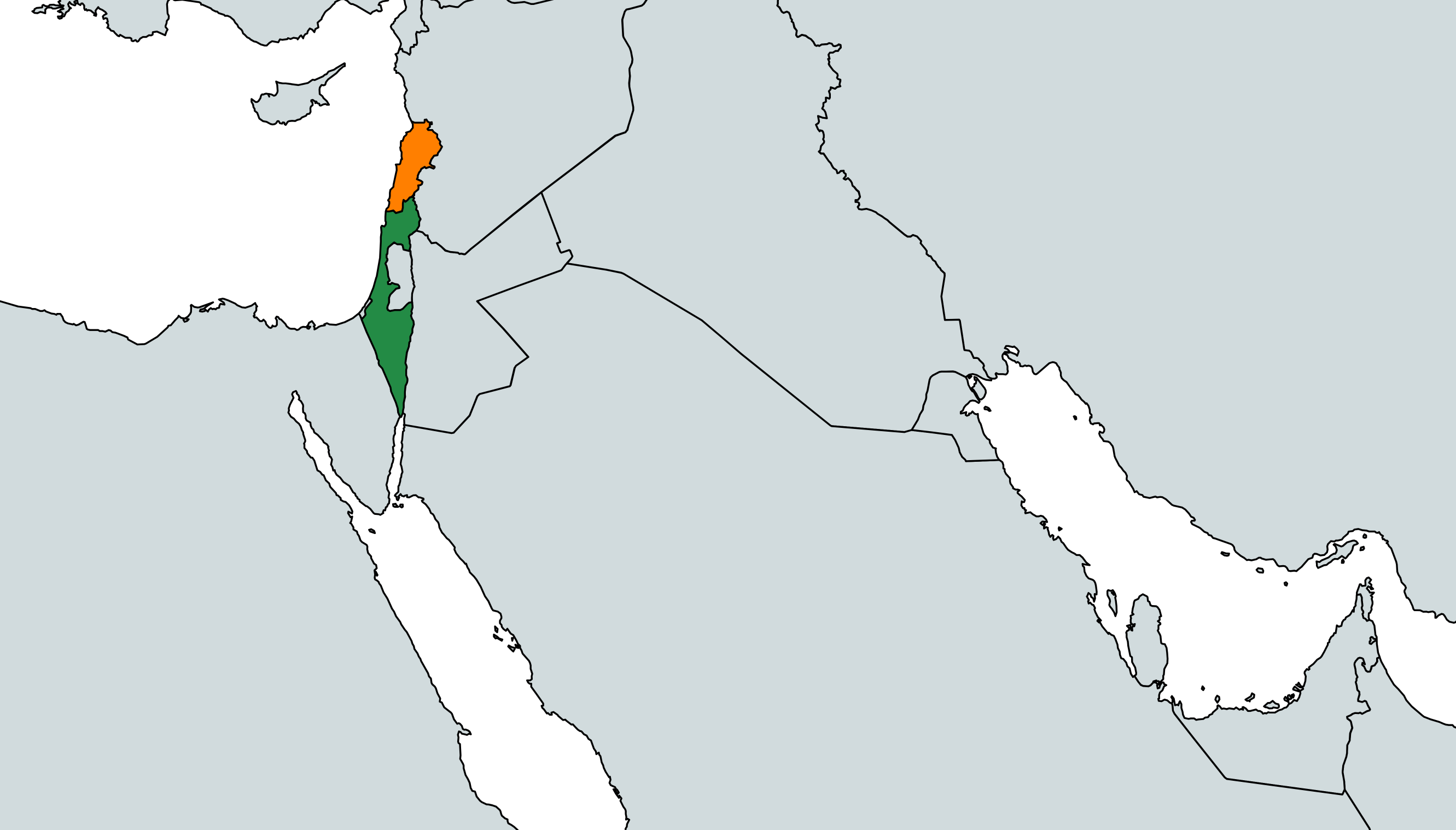
- Israel: Lebanon

Israel–Lebanon relations have been characterized by armed conflict, mutual hostility, and the absence of diplomatic relations since the establishment of Israel in 1948. Lebanon participated in the 1948 Arab–Israeli War, and although it signed an armistice agreement with Israel in 1949, the two countries remain in a formal state of war and continue to regard each other as enemy states under aspects of their domestic law.

From 1949 until the late 1960s, the Israel–Lebanon border was generally the quietest of Israel's frontiers with neighboring Arab states. Relations deteriorated following the arrival of Palestinian militant groups in southern Lebanon, contributing to repeated cross-border hostilities, the 1978 Israeli invasion, the 1982 Lebanon War, Israel's occupation of southern Lebanon until 2000, and the rise of Hezbollah. The two countries signed the U.S.-brokered May 17 Agreement in 1983, intended to normalize relations, but it was never fully implemented and was annulled by Lebanon the following year.

Since Israel's withdrawal from southern Lebanon in 2000, relations have remained hostile, marked by periodic military confrontations, including the 2006 Lebanon War, 2024 Lebanon War, and 2026 Lebanon War.

== History ==
=== Background (1948–1970) ===
Lebanon played a small part in the 1948 Arab–Israeli War, where its army only participated in the battle of al-Malikiya on 5–6 June 1948. During Operation Hiram, Israel captured 15 villages in Southern Lebanon up to the Litani River. While one Israeli general proposed capturing Beirut, which he claimed could be done in 12 hours, Israel's Prime Minister David Ben-Gurion refused permission. The armistice agreement between Lebanon and Israel was relatively straightforward. Unlike the other armistice agreements, there was no clause disclaiming the Blue Line as the international border between Lebanon and the former British Mandate of Palestine (unrelated to the now government of Palestine) continued to be treated as the de jure international border. As a result, Israeli forces withdrew from the villages it had seized during offensive operations in October 1948.

Unlike in other Arab states, the Jewish population of Lebanon grew after the 1948 founding of the State of Israel, mostly due to the large Christian population in Lebanon.

In the early 1950s, direct flights linking Beirut with East Jerusalem were not uncommon. In 1951, Middle East Airlines, Lebanese national flag-carrier, expanded its regional network to include East Jerusalem, Jordan. Also, Air Liban, another Lebanese airline carrier, had flight routes linking Beirut with Jerusalem since 1945. However, the 1967 Six-Day War disrupted Middle East Airlines' operations for about two weeks, and led to the suspension of flights to Jerusalem. Lebanon played a minor role in the Six-Day War, carrying out a single air raid on the first day of the war in which it lost one aircraft.

During the Yom Kippur War, Lebanon sent radar units to Syria for air defense, but refrained from participating in the war.

Following Black September in Jordan in 1970–71, the PLO relocated from Jordan to Southern Lebanon, from where it had carried out attacks against Israel. Israel did not refrain from targeting Lebanese infrastructure when retaliating for fedayeen attacks, notably in the 1968 raid on Beirut Airport. This turned Lebanon, which had largely stayed out of the Arab-Israeli armed conflicts, into a battleground between Israel and Palestinian fedayeen.

=== Lebanese Civil War and Israeli intervention (1975–1990) ===
The Lebanese Civil War began in 1975 when Phalangist gunmen ambushed a bus, killing the 27 Palestinian passengers onboard. The complexities of the war were tied to Lebanon's sectarian political structure dividing Shia and Sunni Muslims and Christians.

In 1982, Israel invaded Lebanon in the middle of the civil war after a gunman from Abu Nidal's organization attempted to assassinate Shlomo Argov. The Israeli Prime Minister blamed the PLO for the incident, and used it as an excuse to begin Operation Peace for Galilee and the 1982 Lebanon War. During the invasion Israel allied with the Phalangist Christian militant group against the PLO and Shia militias. UN Children's Fund (UNICEF) wrote that from the beginning of the Israeli attack on June 4 to August 15, 1982, 29,506 Lebanese and Palestinians had been killed as a result of the Israeli bombardments, 80% of them civilians. Several thousand people were arrested and kept in Israeli-controlled prisons. The Israeli army cut off electricity and water supply to West Beirut, depriving at least 300,000 civilians of water and electricity for about three months. The MacBride Commission published a report in 1983 which said that the scale of the destruction showed that the Israeli army had blanket-bombed areas instead of attacking defined targets. Their bombardment of residential neighborhoods of West Beirut was extensive, and there was widespread destruction of civilian properties. In cases of hospital destruction, the commission said there were no weapons or ammunition in the establishments, yet the Gaza hospital was bombed heavily for three hours.

After the PLO was ejected from Lebanon's capital Beirut in the summer of 1982, Israel hoped to help put Christian Bachir Gemayel in power as Lebanese president. Bachir Gemayel flew to the Israeli coastal town of Nahariya to talk with Menachem Begin and Ariel Sharon. Begin and Sharon proposed that Israel and Lebanon establish full diplomatic relations, but Gemayel proposed a kind of formal non-aggression pact. When Sharon reminded Gemayel that Israel controlled most of Lebanon at that time and that it would be wise to follow Israel's instructions, Gemayel held out his hands and replied "Put the handcuffs on. [...] I am not your vassal." Gemayel left Israel without making any formal agreement. Before the elections, he was assassinated by the Syrian Social Nationalist Party, throwing Lebanon again into crisis.

Following the assassination of Lebanese President by oppositional factions, the Israeli army occupied Beirut, and allowed the Lebanese Forces (LF) to enter the Sabra and Shatila refugee camps, where the LF carried out a massacre of mostly Palestinians and Lebanese Shiites. Between 1,390 and 3,500 civilians were massacred. It sparked international outrage for Israel's actions, particularly because the PLO had already been removed from Lebanon. The Kahan Commission by the Israeli government found Defense Minister Ariel Sharon personally responsible for the bloodshed. The incident led to his resignation as Defense Minister, however he remained in the Israeli Cabinet and would later become Israeli Prime Minister in 2001.

Israel and Lebanon signed an agreement on May 17, 1983 which was a peace treaty in all but name. Lebanon signed the agreement under American and Israeli pressure, but it was opposed by Syria. The agreement was conditional on Syrian withdrawal, which did not occur until April 2005. Much of the content of the treaty was contained in secret protocols and memoranda, and it did not win expected Jordanian and Saudi endorsement. The Lebanese legislature ratified the treaty by a margin of 80 votes, but in a very weak and unstable domestic position, president Amine Gemayel abrogated the peace treaty on March 5, 1984 under unrelenting Syrian pressure and takeover of West Beirut by Druze and Shiite militias, after the U.S. Marines withdrew and after Israel had begun withdrawing from Lebanon.

=== Israeli occupation of Southern Lebanon (1990s) ===
The Lebanese Civil War gradually came to a halt after the 1989 Taif Agreement. Furthermore, the success of the 1991 Persian Gulf War created new opportunities for Middle East peacemaking. In October 1991, under the sponsorship of the United States and the then Soviet Union, Middle East peace talks were held in Madrid, where Israel and a majority of its Arab neighbors conducted direct bilateral negotiations to seek a just, lasting, and comprehensive peace based on UN Security Council Resolutions 242 and 338 (and 425 on Lebanon) and the concept of "land for peace." Lebanon, Jordan, Syria, and representatives of the Palestinians continued negotiating until the Oslo interim peace accords were concluded between Israel and the Palestinians in September 1993 and Jordan and Israel signed an agreement in October 1994. In March 1996, Syria and Israel held another round of Madrid talks; the Lebanon track did not reconvene.

During this time, Israel continued to militarily occupy 10% of Lebanese land, in a southern strip called the South Lebanon Security Belt. In response, the militant Shia group Hezbollah formed with Syrian and Iranian backing. They conducted guerrilla warfare against Israel to resist the occupation. In 1990, the Israeli army burned down olive groves to "deprive Hezbollah guerrillas of cover". The Israeli army planted some 130,000 land mines throughout the strip, making farming deadly. As tensions continued to grow, in 1993 Israeli Prime Minister Yitzhak Rabin launched "Operation Accountability", with the intention of cutting Hezbollah's supply lines, destroying its camps, and forcing Lebanese civilians to flee north. In early April 1996, Israel conducted the military operation "Grapes of Wrath" in response to Hezbollah's actions on Israeli military bases in south Lebanon. The 16-day operation caused hundreds of thousands of civilians in south Lebanon to flee their homes. On April 18, several Israeli shells struck refugee compounds, killing 102 civilians sheltered there.

Throughout the 1990s, discontent had been growing in Israel about the occupation of parts of Lebanon. Discontent increased as a result of a 1997 helicopter crash that killed 73 Israeli soldiers bound for Lebanon. Ehud Barak campaigned for prime minister on a platform of withdrawing from Lebanon. On June 28, 1999 Farid Abboud, the Lebanese ambassador to the U.S., addressed the Los Angeles World Affairs Council to give an update on the peace process. Finally, on May 23, 2000, the Israeli military carried out a withdrawal of Israeli troops from the south and the Bekaa valley, effectively ending 22 years of occupation. The SLA collapsed and about 6,000 SLA members and their families fled the country, although more than 2,200 had returned by December 2001. With the withdrawal of Israeli forces, many in Lebanon began calling for a review of the continued presence of Syrian troops, estimated in late 2001 at approximately 25,000.

The destruction of Lebanese infrastructure that the Israeli military left behind, particularly water infrastructure, was devastating to Southern Lebanon. The Lebanese government turned to organizations such as the Arab Fund, the Kuwait Fund, and the Council for Development and Reconstruction, who invested around $50 million to rebuild water networks, and $63 million to rebuild schools, hospitals, and electricity infrastructure that had been destroyed.

=== Post-withdrawal relations (2000s) ===
On June 16, 2000, the UN Security Council adopted the report of the Secretary General verifying Israeli compliance with UNSCR 425 and the withdrawal of Israeli troops to their side of the demarcated Lebanese-Israeli line of separation (the "Blue Line") mapped out by UN cartographers. (The international border between Lebanon and Israel is still to be determined in the framework of a peace agreement.) In August, the Government of Lebanon deployed over 1,000 police and soldiers to the former security zone, but Hezbollah also maintained observation posts and conducted patrols along the Blue Line. While Lebanon and Syria agreed to respect the Blue Line, both have registered objections and continue to argue that Israel has not fully withdrawn from Lebanese soil. As regional tension escalated with the Palestinian intifada in September 2000, Hezbollah cited Blue Line discrepancies when it reengaged Israel on October 7, taking three Israeli soldiers captive in an area known as Shebaa Farms. This largely unpopulated Israeli-controlled territory along the border between Lebanon and Syria is claimed by Lebanon, although the United Nations and Israel agree that Shebaa Farms is part of Syria. Hezbollah sought to use the captives for leverage to release Lebanese prisoners.

==== Cedar Revolution ====
Since the beginning of the Cedar Revolution, hopes had increased of an Israel-Lebanon peace treaty. In a May 2005 Newsweek interview, Saad Hariri said "We would like to have peace with Israel. We don't want wars. We hope that the peace process moves ahead with us, with the Syrians, with all the Arab countries", but he added that Lebanon would not sign a separate peace treaty as Jordan and Egypt have done. Other Lebanese leaders draw an even harder line.

==== 2006 Lebanon War ====
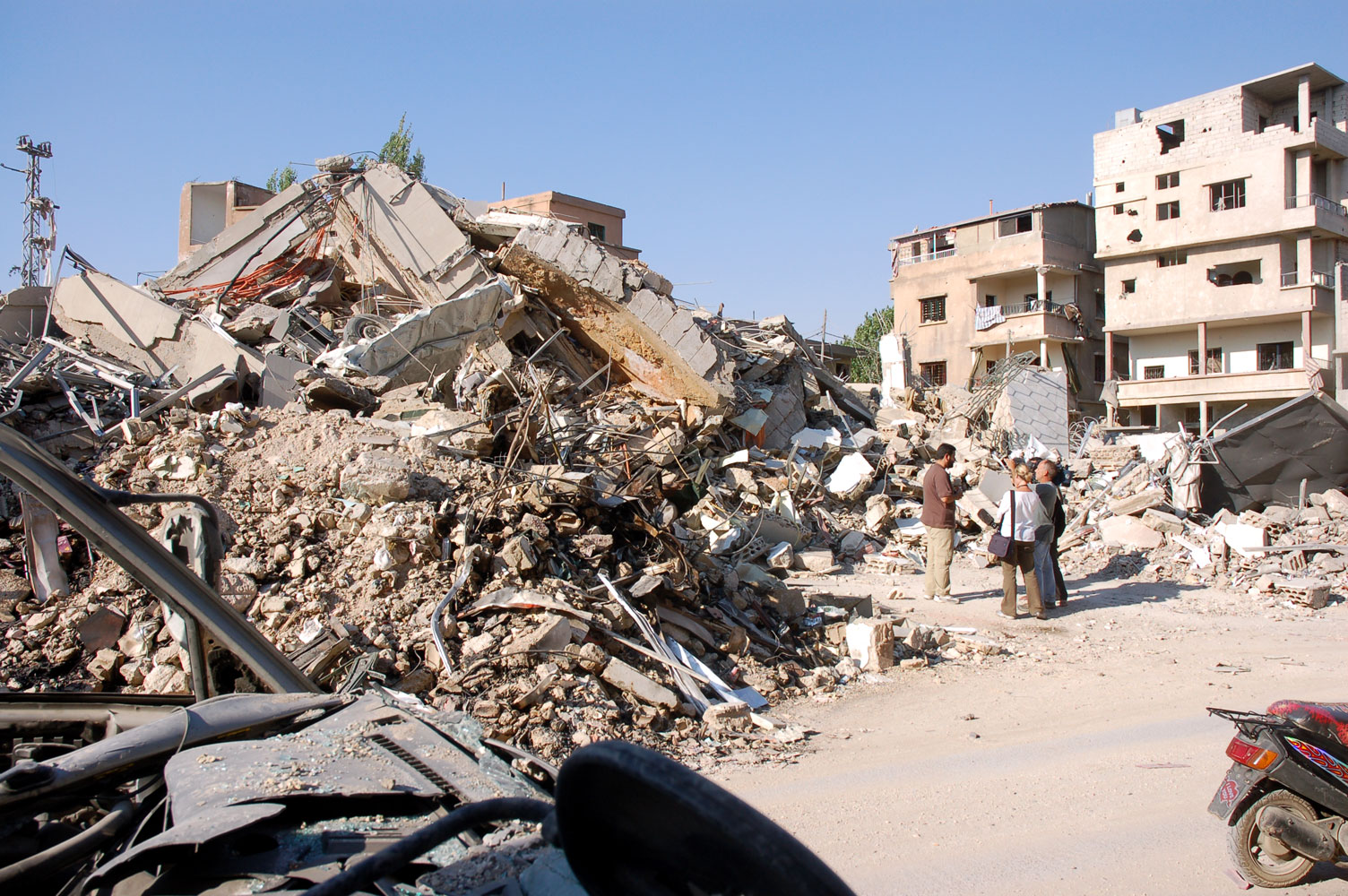
Results of Israeli bombing in Baalbek

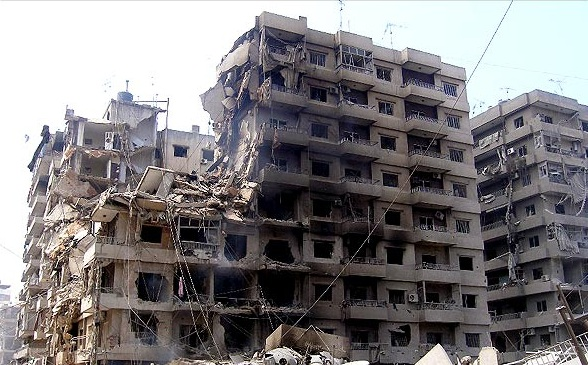
Results of Israeli bombing in Beirut

Lebanese Prime Minister Fouad Siniora said in August 2006 that Lebanon would be the "last Arab country to make peace with Israel" because of the large number of civilians who were killed in the 2006 Lebanon War. Hassan Nasrallah, the leader of Hezbollah, proclaimed "Death to Israel" and promised the "liberation" of Jerusalem.

It was uncovered in the cache of diplomatic cables released by WikiLeaks that, in 2008, the Lebanese Defense Minister had sent messages to Israel via the United States stating the Lebanese Army would refrain from getting involved in a future conflict between Israel and Hezbollah and that the army, as quoted in the cables "will move to pre-position food, money, and water with these units so they can stay on their bases when Israel comes for Hezbollah — discreetly, Murr added." Additionally, he advised Israel to ensure not to "bomb bridges and infrastructure in the Christian areas." According to former U.S. Ambassador to Lebanon Michele Sison, the dispatcher of the cable, "Murr offered some ideas aimed at avoiding turning the Christian population against Israel when the next war with Hezbollah occurs... Murr also outlined his orders to the Lebanese Army when/if Israel invades to counter Hezbollah."

=== General calm with sporadic border incidents (2010s) ===
On August 3, 2010, a clash took place near the Lebanese border village of Odaisseh between the Israel Defense Forces and Lebanese Armed Forces after an Israeli patrol operating on the border clashed with Lebanese troops. Israel claimed that the troops had stayed within Israel, while Lebanon claimed that the soldiers had crossed the border to uproot trees. An ensuing firefight resulted in the deaths of three Lebanese soldiers and one senior Israeli commander; two Israeli soldiers and five Lebanese soldiers were also wounded. A Lebanese journalist was also killed. Israeli artillery and helicopter gunships then struck several Lebanese Army posts and the Lebanese Army's southern headquarters, destroying several military vehicles.

On November 13, 2010, Israel Defense Forces patrolling along the Israeli northern border detected an 80-year-old Lebanese woman whose clothes had tangled in the Lebanese side of the border fence. The elderly woman was caught in a part of the fence which was adjacent to a mine field and when it became clear the Lebanese Army could not assist her, the IDF stepped in. A joint military force of engineering, scouts and Golani troops, pulled the woman into Israeli territory while the Lebanese Army observed the rescue operation. After making sure the woman was not injured, UNIFIL representatives contacted the Lebanese Army and coordinated her return to Lebanon via the Rosh HaNikra Crossing.

On December 15, 2013, a Lebanese soldier shot and killed an IDF soldier at the Rosh HaNikra Crossing.

On 2 September 2019, a day after rocket strikes toward Israeli's border, Hassan Nasrallah said Hezbollah would begin targeting Israeli drones flying in Lebanese airspace, and announced there were "no more red lines" in the fight against Israel. If attacked again, he said, Hezbollah would strike "deep inside" Israel.

=== Israeli invasion of Lebanon (2024) ===
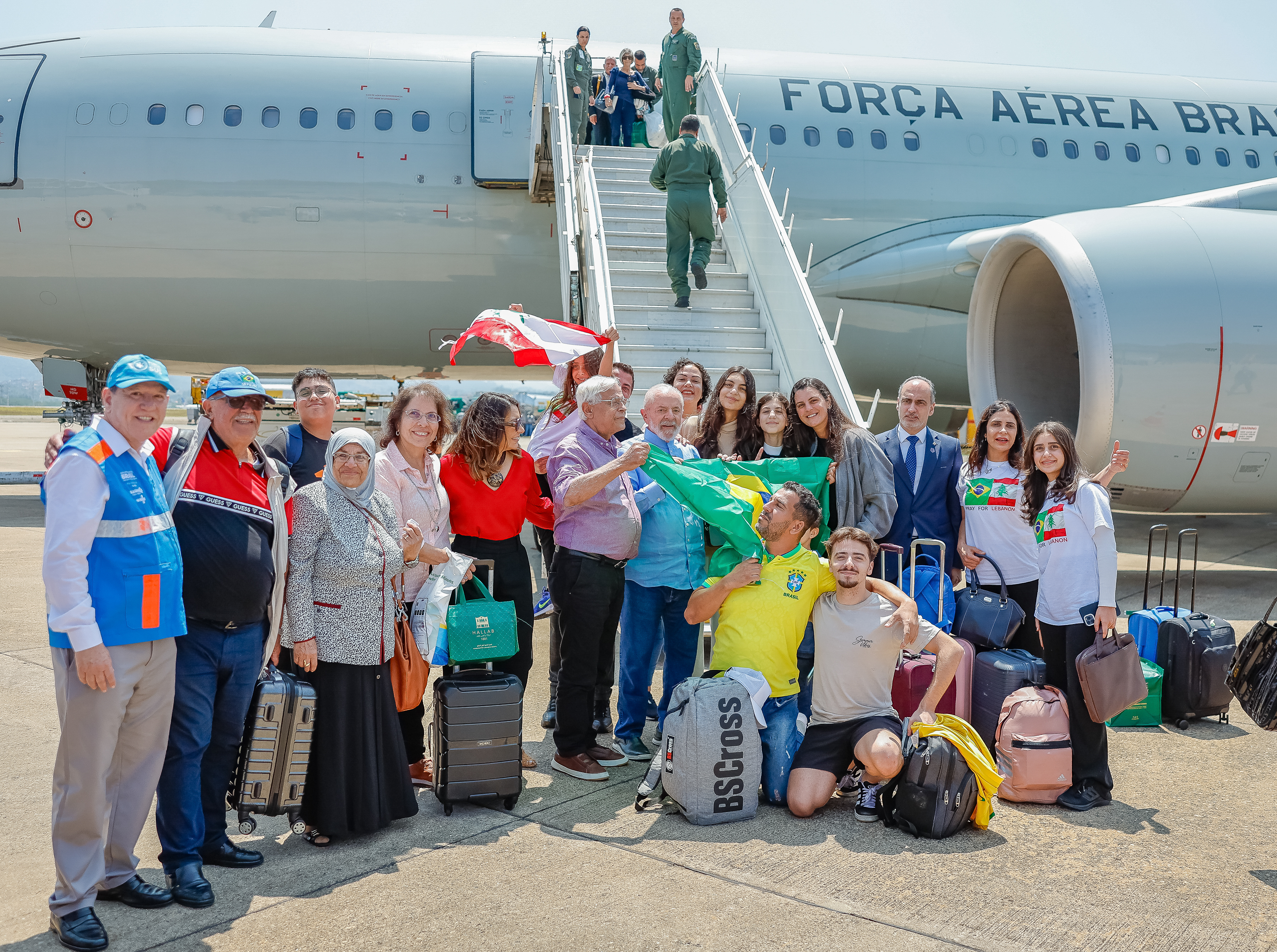
President Lula da Silva receiving repatriated Brazilian nationals from Lebanon on 6 October 2024. Brazil has the highest number of Lebanese descendants and expatriates in the world.

On 1 October 2024, Israel launched its sixth invasion of Southern Lebanon, following nearly a year of conflict with Hezbollah. This escalation occurred after Hezbollah joined the Gaza war, attacking northern Israel and the Israeli-occupied Golan Heights. The hostilities caused significant displacement on both sides. Israel had previously conducted extensive aerial bombing in Lebanon, including attacks on infrastructure and the assassination of Hezbollah leader Hassan Nasrallah. These actions resulted in significant casualties, with over 800 Lebanese deaths reported in a single week in late September.

The invasion led to the Lebanese Armed Forces retreating from parts of the Blue Line. By November 26, a ceasefire agreement mediated by France and the United States was signed and took effect the following day, though sporadic attacks persisted. Israel reported 56 soldiers and 2,762 Hezbollah fighters killed, while Lebanon claimed that 2,720 people, predominantly civilians, died due to Israeli actions.

In April 2025, Hezbollah signaled willingness to discuss disarmament with President Joseph Aoun, on the condition that Israel withdraws from five southern hilltop positions and halts its strikes. Aoun, under rising pressure, seeks to bring all weapons under state control. The group, weakened by the 2024 conflict, insists Israel must act first before any transfer of arms.

==== 2026 peace talks ====
Following a round of Israeli incursions into Lebanon in April 2026, it was decided to hold in Washington, D.C. the peace negotiations meeting between the two countries. The event was hosted by U.S. Secretary of State Marco Rubio on April 14, 2026. Israeli Prime Minister Benjamin Netanyahu stated "we want the dismantling of Hezbollah's weapons, and we want a real peace agreement that will last for generations." On the Lebanese side, President Joseph Aoun declared he hoped the Washington talks will yield "an agreement...on a ceasefire in Lebanon, with the aim of starting direct negotiations between Lebanon and Israel." On June 26, a preliminary framework agreement was signed in Washington that stipulated that Israeli forces were to withdraw from Lebanon once Hizbullah was dismantled by the Lebanese army.

== Alleged spying arrests in Lebanon ==
In the period of April 2009 – July 2010, Lebanese authorities arrested almost 100 people suspected of spying on behalf of Israel. Many were expected to receive the death penalty, which the Lebanese cabinet announced it intended to carry out. Yet, it ended up not being the case, and death penalties were sequently de facto suspended in Lebanon, substituted with life imprisonment as the maximum penalty.

One such instance is the case of Ali al-Jarrah, a Lebanese man who has accused of spying for Israel for 25 years. He was recruited by Israel to photograph Hezbollah supply routes and frequently moved between the Lebanon-Syria border. In 2011, a military court in Lebanon sentenced al-Jarrah to life in prison.

== Maritime border dispute ==
In 2010, Israel discovered massive deposits of natural gas off its coast in the Mediterranean Sea. While Israel's find is within its territorial exclusive economic zone, the dispute stems from the possibility that the gas field spans to Lebanon's boundary. A general principle in such a situation is the rule of capture where each side is permitted to lift as much as it can on its side. Israel has already started exploration and construction on its side, while Lebanese authorities have not yet officially demarcated its exclusive economic zone or initiated a process of attracting bids for exploration rights.

Lebanese Energy Minister Gebran Bassil warned that Lebanon would not allow Israel or any company "serving Israeli interests" to drill gas "that is in our territory". Beirut had previously warned the American Noble Energy company not to approach its territory. In response, Israeli Infrastructure Minister Uzi Landau warned Lebanon that Israel was willing to use force to protect the gas reserves discovered off its shores.

U.S.-mediated negotiations hosted by the UN over the dispute began October 12, 2020. These negotiations led to an agreement resolving the Israeli–Lebanese maritime border dispute, signed on October 27, 2022.

== Legal status and travel restrictions ==
Israeli law enforcement treats Lebanon as an "enemy state". Israeli citizens or any other person who holds any passport bearing stamps, visas, or seals issued by Israel are strictly prohibited from entry to Lebanon and may be subject to arrest or detention for further inspection.

== Public opinion ==
In 2008, a Pew Research Center survey found that negative views concerning Jews were most common in Lebanon, with 97% of Lebanese having unfavorable opinion of Jews. In a 2011 survey again by the Pew Research Center, the Muslim-majority Middle Eastern countries polled held strongly negative views of Jews, only 3% of Lebanese reported having a positive view of Jews.

== See also ==
- History of the Jews in Lebanon
- Israeli–Lebanese conflict
- Palestinians in Lebanon
- Shebaa Farms
- Blue Line (withdrawal line)
- South Lebanon Army
- United Nations Interim Force in Lebanon
- Jewish migration from Lebanon post-1948
- Maronites in Israel
