= Achziv Islands =

Small Israeli islands in the Mediterranean Sea

Native name: איי אכזיב
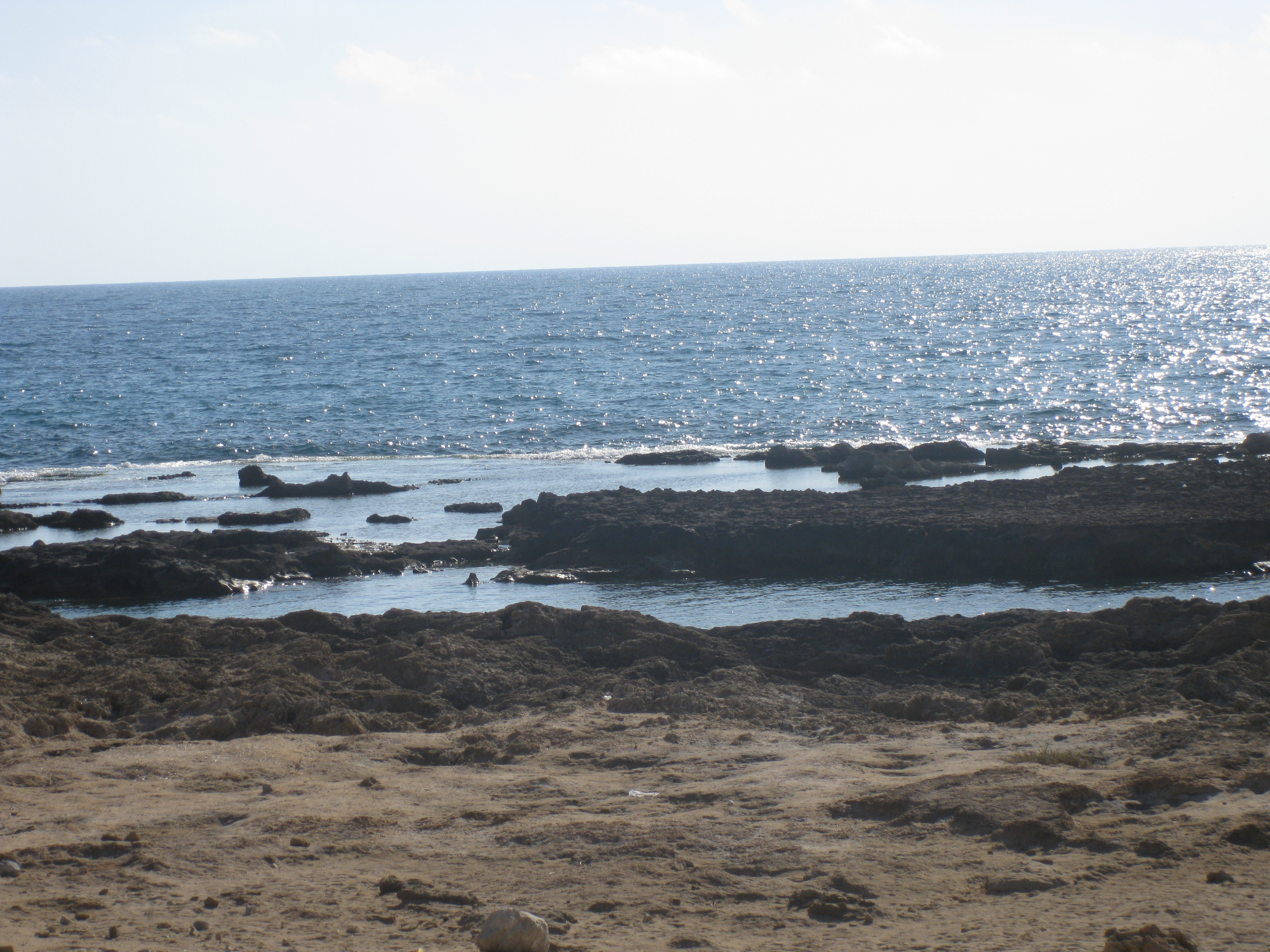
- Achziv Beach

- Location within Israel
- Interactive map of Achziv Islands

Geography
- Location: Mediterranean Sea
- Coordinates: 33.0417°N 35.0831°E
- Total islands: 5

Administration
- Israel

Achziv Islands are a group of five small islets in the Mediterranean Sea, located about one kilometer off the coast of Rosh Hanikra and Achziv, near the city of Nahariya in northern Israel. These islands are remnants of one of three kurkar ridges that run parallel to Israel’s coastline, extending from the north down to the Sharon plain. Over time, parts of the ridge have eroded, sunk, or crumbled. It is also part of the three northernmost islets, known collectively as the Rosh Hanikra Islands, which form a protected nature reserve where public entry is prohibited.

However, the largest island, Shagavion, also nicknamed "Love Island," is the only one open to the public. The surrounding area was significant during the Mishnaic period, when nearby Achziv had a synagogue and was known for producing purple dye from the local sea snails, used in religious garments such as the tallit. The island remained deserted until the 1980s, when two entrepreneurs established a small kiosk-restaurant, attracting visitors by boat and swimmers alike. Despite the challenges of limited supplies and basic facilities, the place thrived—until a storm destroyed the kiosk. Afterward, they began offering motorboat tours to the island and nearby coastal attractions.

== Overview ==
=== Background ===
The island, originally known as Shagavion (Hebrew: שגביון), named after the head of the synagogue of Achzib, who is mentioned in the Talmud, was later nicknamed "Love Island"(Hebrew: אי האהבה) by Israelis and visitors. In ancient times, the area was significant. During the Mishnaic period, a synagogue stood in nearby Achziv, which was known for producing purple dye from local sea snails, used to color religious garments such as the Jewish prayer shawl, the tallit.

=== Tourism development ===
The island remained deserted until the 1980s, when Shmulik Wiesengreen (Hebrew: שמוליק ויסנגרין), a boat engine repairman and entrepreneur, along with his friend Danny Birnbaum (Hebrew: דני בירנבוים), a diving instructor and a pioneer in marine tourism in the Achziv area, decided to launch a small tourism venture together. Wiesengreen transported tools and wooden planks by boat to build a modest kiosk-restaurant. The site served a variety of drinks and dishes, and despite logistical challenges, quickly gained popularity, attracting visitors by boat—and even swimmers who made their way to the island through the water. Birnbaum described the experience as feeling "like Hawaii," and noted that when the mayor of Nahariya wanted to impress his guests, he would bring them to visit the island. The island also drew notable visitors, including then-Minister of Tourism Avraham Sharir and Al Gore.

Birnbaum later recalled the struggles of running the kiosk: “We didn’t have a freezer or pantry, so if we ran out of something like salt, someone had to make the hour-long boat trip to Nahariya and back. Every day we had to bring supplies, and each night we’d take everything down to avoid theft. The boat ride wasn’t easy either — the boats were basic, there were no proper docks, and the crossing could be rough and unsafe." After a few weeks of constructing the restaurant, a strong storm destroyed the project. Birnbaum described the moment: "One morning, I saw the restaurant’s planks scattered across the sand. It was over." Later, the place was reported closed after only four months, under pressure from politicians and nature reserve officials fearing harm to the natural environment.

In the aftermath of the storm, Birnbaum looked for safer ways to bring visitors to the island, which led him to import the first "Tornado" motorboat to Israel from Europe. He later began offering tours along the coastline, including visits to Rosh Hanikra. As of 2020s, Israeli companies such as Trek Yamn continue to offer similar tours.

== Geography ==
The Achziv Islands are five small islands located in the Mediterranean Sea, about a kilometer off the coast of Rosh Hanikra and Achziv, near Nahariya in northern Israel. They are remnants of one of the three kurkar ridges that stretch along Israel’s coastline from north to south to the Sharon region, and have gradually sunk or crumbled over the years. The three northernmost islands, collectively known as the Rosh Hanikra Islands (Hebrew: איי ראש הנקרה), are designated as a nature reserve, where entry is prohibited.

These islands, from north to south, are: Tekhelet (Hebrew: תכלת), Shahaf (Hebrew: שחף), and Nahlieli (Hebrew: נחליאלי), serve as nesting colonies for waterfowl that return annually. South of them lie two more islands from the same ridge: Achziv (Hebrew: אכזיב), and the largest of the group, Shagavion (Hebrew: שגביון), also nicknamed "Love Island" (Hebrew: אי האהבה), is about a dunam and a half in size and is the only island among the five that is not declared a nature reserve. It lies just a five-minute boat ride from the coast of Nahariya. It is part of the same kurkar ridge that begins at Rosh Hanikra and continues south toward Haifa, located roughly opposite Achziv National Park.

== See also ==
- Geography of Israel
