= Almas (missile) =

Iranian air-to-surface missile

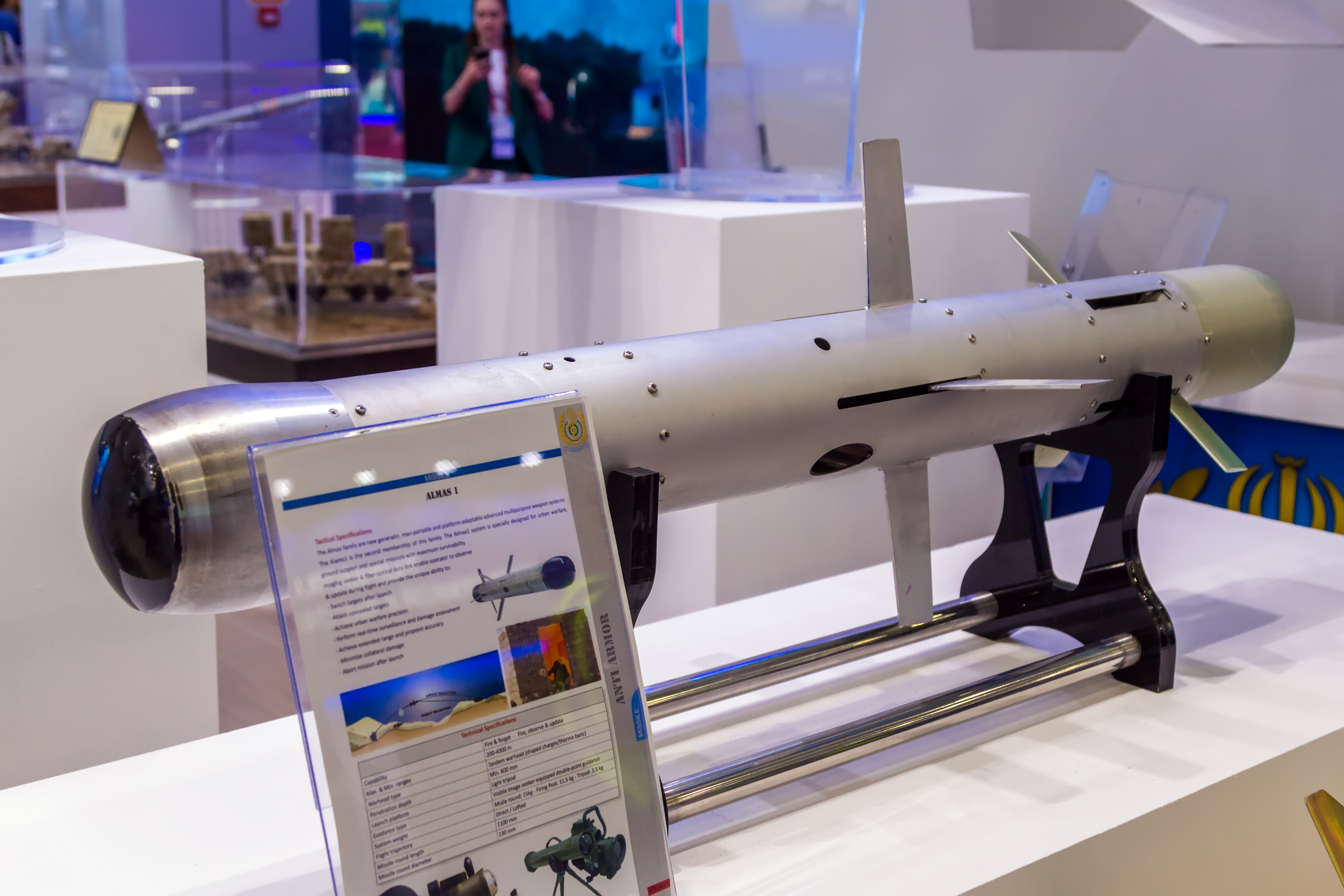
- Type: Surface-to-surface missile Air-to-surface missile
- Place of origin: Iran

Service history
- In service: 2021-present
- Wars: Israel–Hezbollah conflict (2023–2024); 2026 Lebanon war

Specifications
- Warhead: Tandem HEAT/thermobaric
- Engine: Solid-fuel rocket
- Operational range: 4 km (Almas-1)
- Guidance system: Imaging infrared homing (IIR) & electro-optical (EO)

Almas (Persian: الماس, lit. 'diamond') is a family of unlicensed Iranian copies of the Israeli Spike family of surface-to-surface and air-to-surface missiles used for anti-armor attacks.

== History ==
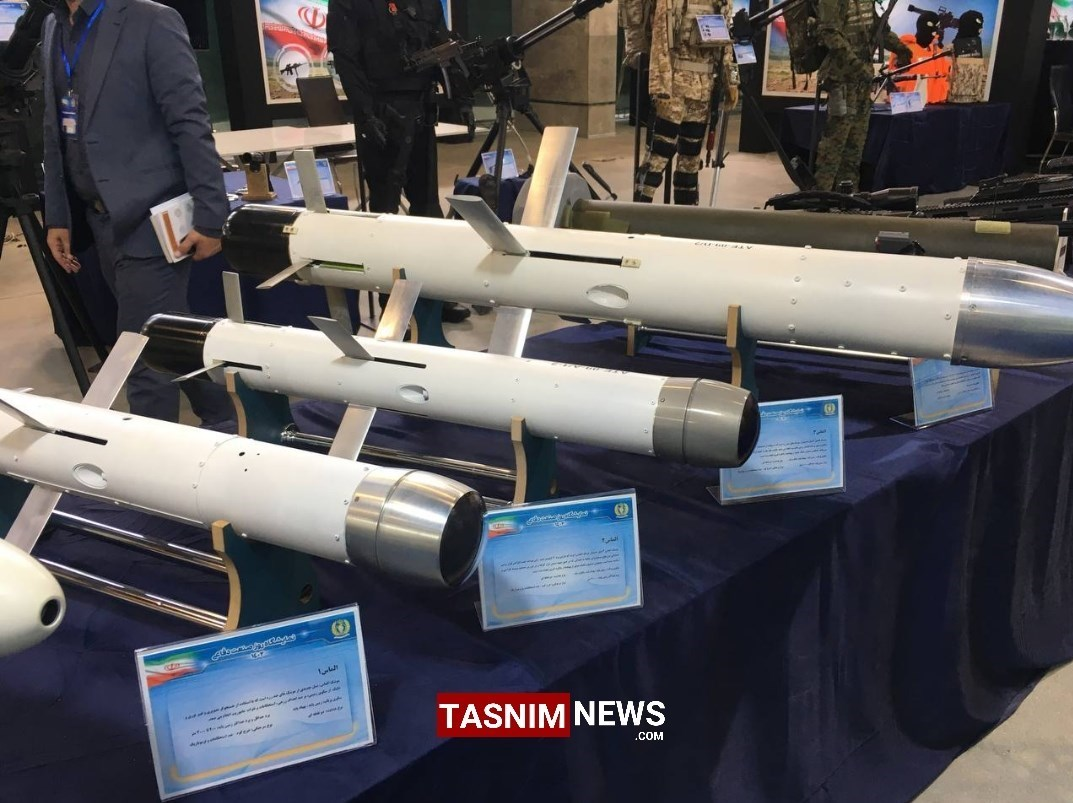
Almas 1/2/3 at a defense expo

Iran reportedly was transferred Israeli Spike-MR missiles that were captured during the 2006 Lebanon War by Hezbollah, which were converted into an unlicensed variant of the missile that was designated the Almas-1. The ground-launched ATGM version was unveiled in public on 7 July 2021. It was shown overseas at the MILEX 2023 exhibition held in May in Belarus and at the Partner 2023 exhibition held in September in Serbia.

On 25 January 2024, a video was released that appeared to show Hezbollah forces using the system against an Israeli surveillance outpost at Shlomi. On 27 January 2024, another attack involving the Almas was reported at Rosh HaNikra.

In November 2024, it was reported that Israeli troops captured Almas ATGMs alongside Kornets from Hezobollah forces during Operation Northern Arrows.

In January 2025, it was reported that the Badr ATGM was developed based on the Almas.

== Variants ==
=== Almas-1 ===
Exact copy of the Spike with a range of 4,000 meters and weight of 15 kg.

=== Almas-2 ===
Has a range of 8,000 meters when fired from the ground with claims of penetrating up to 1,000 mm of armor.

=== Almas-3 ===
Clone of the Spike ER with its warhead based on a two-stage high-explosive or thermobaric type. It has a range between 10 and 16 km.

=== Almas-4 ===
Almas-4, the newer generation of this missile, among other improvements, send clearer images of its flight back to its operators. According to CAT-UXO, a munitions awareness group, this missile can carry two types of warheads. One can detonate in two phases, making it easier to penetrate armor. The other is a fuel-air bomb that explodes into a fireball. It is reportedly based on the Spike NLOS.

== Operators ==
- Hezbollah: Known to be using the Almas. They claim to possess Almas-1/2/3.
- Iran: Reverse engineered Spike-MR with modifications. Originally captured by Hezbollah during the 2006 Lebanon War and given to Iran. Known to be used by the Islamic Revolutionary Guard Corps Ground Forces.
