= Hanikra border clash =

2013 Israel–Lebanon border clash
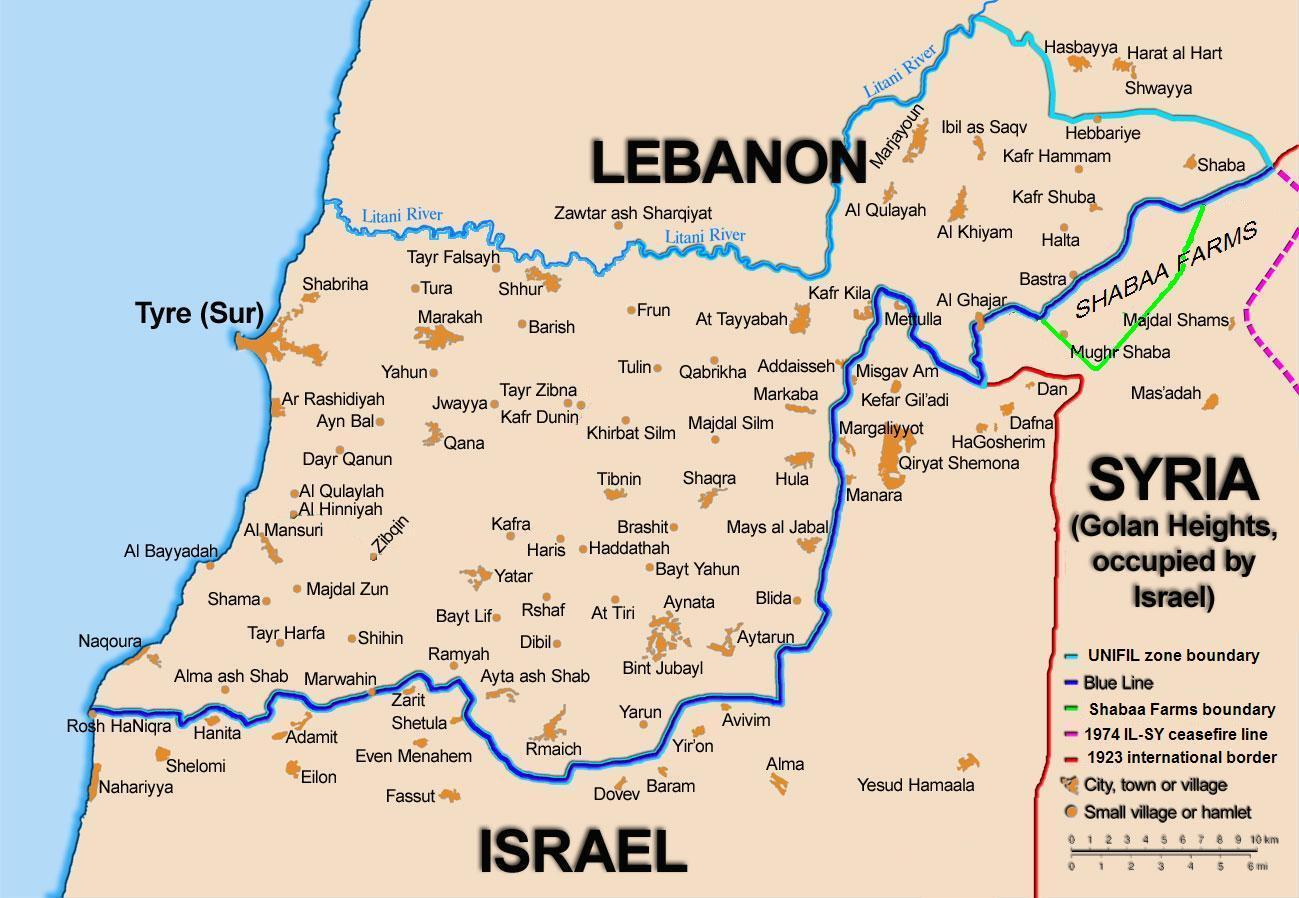
- Blue Line between Israel and Lebanon
| Date | December 15–16, 2013 (1 day) |
| Location | Rosh Hanikra, Israel |
| Result | Fighting subsided: Rogue Lebanese marksmen detained |

Belligerents
| Israel | Lebanon |

Units involved
| (Israel) Israeli Defence Force | (Lebanon) Lebanese Armed Forces |

Casualties and losses
| (Israel) 1 soldier killed (Israel) 1 jeep damaged | (Lebanon) 1 soldier wounded |

The Hanikra border clash was the shooting death of an Israeli soldier and subsequent counter-attack that ensued, wounding a Lebanese soldier. The incident took place in the Rosh HaNikra (HaKira) locality kibbutz on the Lebanese-Israeli border. According to Lebanese authorities the soldier who shot and killed the IDF serviceman acted independently without orders to shoot. The shootout marked the first time an Israeli soldier died confronting Lebanese soldiers since the 2010 Israel–Lebanon border clash.

== Incident ==
On 15 December 2013, at 8:30 pm, Israeli soldier Sergeant Shlomi Cohen, 31, was shot dead by rogue Lebanese army soldier Hassan Ibrahim, 27, a ten-year veteran of the Lebanese military. Ibrahim deserted his army post and shot dead the IDF soldier at close range with a light firearm. The bullets struck him and the military jeep he was driving in 6 to 7 times, between the Rosh HaNikra (known in Lebanon as Naqoura) border crossing and the IDF post he was coming from. The shooting occurred along the fenced Blue Line, 50 meters from the Lebanese border. Israeli military instructions state that no unarmored military vehicle can pass within 100 meters distance of the Lebanese border because of the high risk of being targeted.

=== Israeli military response ===
A quick response was initiated by the Israeli Northern Command in the area. On 16 December, at 1 a.m, two Lebanese soldiers were fired upon based on "suspicious activities" near the scene of the border shooting in a forested area, wounding one soldier. Following the incident, the Lebanese Army put its forces on high alert in the area. The Lebanese military reported Israeli violation of its airspace.

"At 10:15 pm (2015 GMT) yesterday, a drone belonging to the Israeli enemy violated Lebanese airspace over Naqoura, and performed a fly-over of the southern area, then left at 12:40 am."

== Aftermath ==
The Israeli defense Minister Moshe Ya'alon appealed to the United Nations Interim Force in Lebanon, which in turn stressed the need for "self-restraint" on both sides.

Lt. Col. Peter Lerner, IDF spokesman: "The IDF has protested this outrageous breach of Israel’s sovereignty with UNIFIL and has heightened its state of preparedness along the border. We will not tolerate aggression against the State of Israel, and maintain the right to exercise self defense against perpetrators of attacks against Israel and its civilians."

Lebanese soldier Hassan Ibrahim hid in a wooded area and turned himself in to Lebanese authorities the next day, who admitted the soldier of disobeying orders to engage. According to the Prime Minister of Lebanon, Najib Mikati, the soldier will be prosecuted by the Defense Ministry for his actions.
