= Rosh HaNikra Islands =

Group of islands in Israel

Native name: איי ראש הנקרה
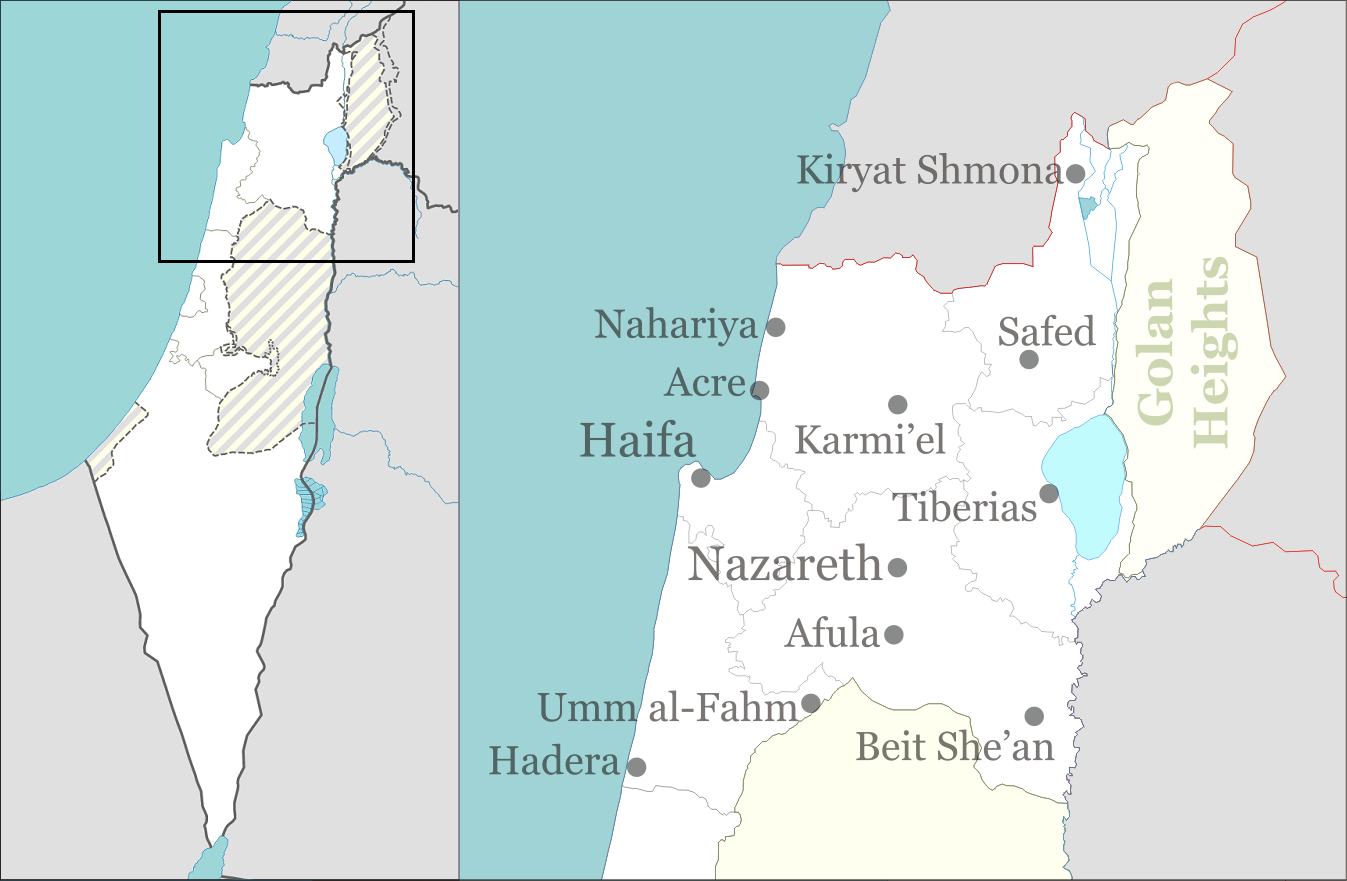
- Location within Northern Haifa region of Israel

Geography
- Location: Mediterranean Sea, near Rosh HaNikra, Israel
- Coordinates: 33°04′19″N 35°05′40″E
- Total islands: 3
- Major islands: Shahaf, Nahalieli, T'chelet

Administration
- Israel

Demographics
- Population: Uninhabited

Additional information
- Part of a nature reserve, visiting is prohibited

The Rosh HaNikra Islands (Hebrew: איי ראש הנקרה, Iye Rosh Hanikra) are a group of three Israeli islands in the Mediterranean Sea, named Shahaf, Nahalieli and T'chelet. The islands are located approximately 800 meters offshore, near Rosh HaNikra. These islands are a single geological unit with the Achziv Islands, that are further south. The depth of the sea water around them is approximately between 7 and 9 meters. The Rosh HaNikra Islands are characterized by many natural pools that provide a natural habitat for various life forms.

The Rosh HaNikra Islands are a part of a natural reserve, and visiting the islands is prohibited. These islands are the only place in Israel where certain rare birds nest: the white wagtail, the European herring gull, and the common tern. The waters surrounding the islands contain a rich variety of marine life.

In ancient days, the islands had a certain economic and commercial significance as they were a natural habitat for the sea snail from which Tyrian purple dye was produced.
