= Rosh HaNikra grottoes =

Geologic formation in northern Israel

Rosh HaNikra
- ראש הנקרה, رأس الناقورة, Ras an-Naqura
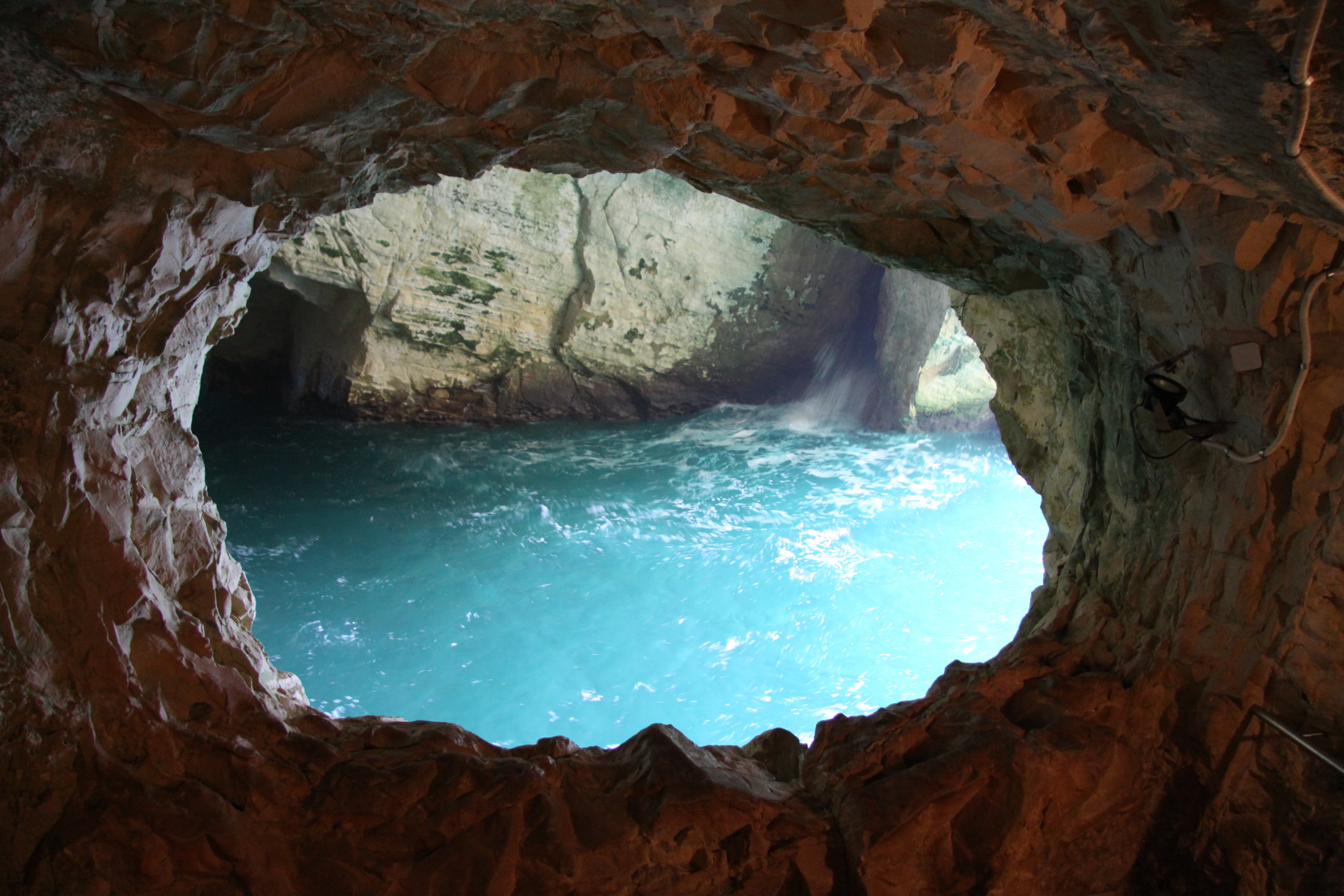
- Rosh HaNikra grottoes

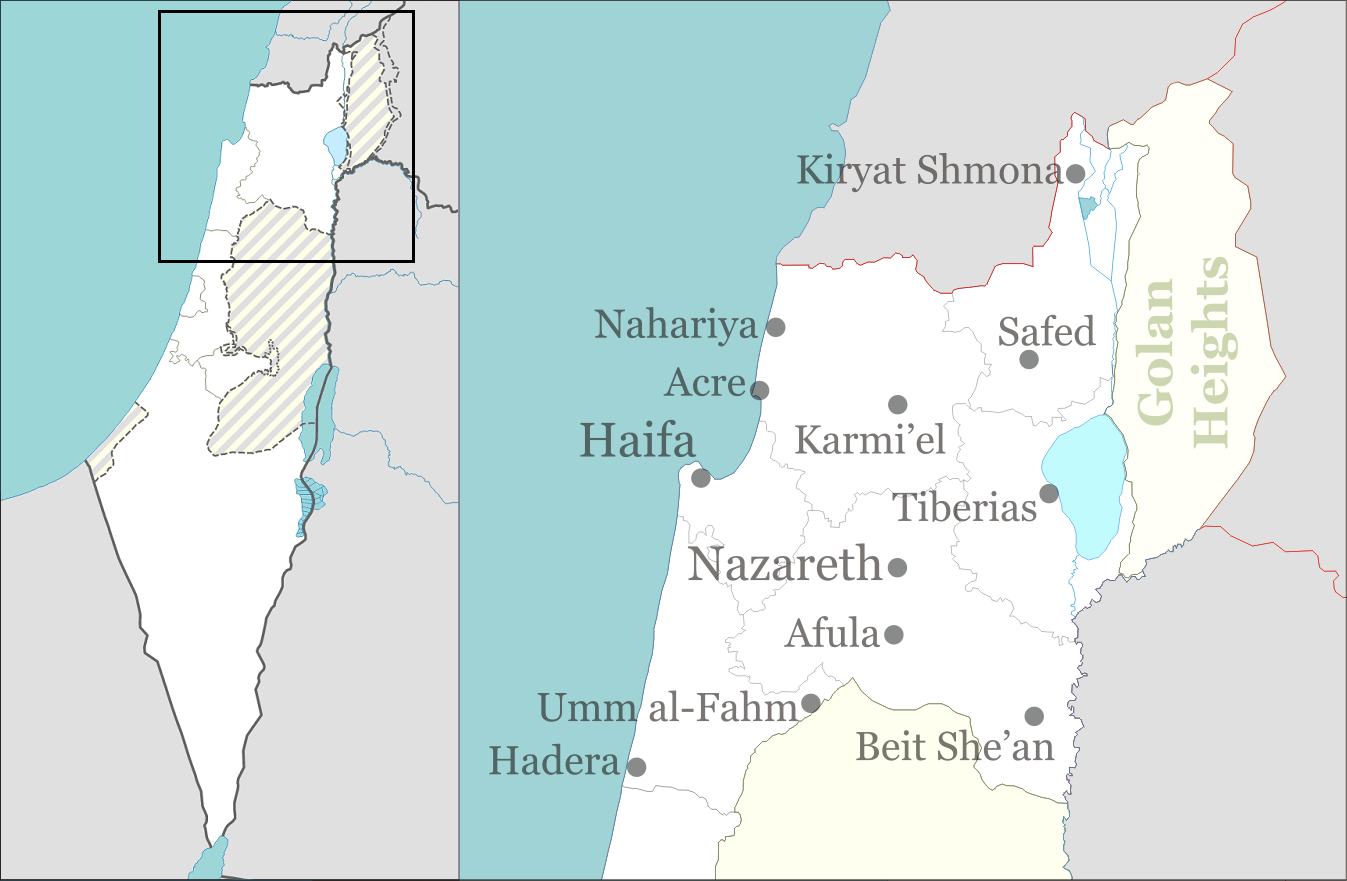
- Location within Northern Haifa region of Israel
- Location: Western Galilee, Israel
- Nearest city: Nahariya
- Coordinates: 33°5′35.24″N 35°6′17.16″E
- Established: 1965-2003 (various parts)
- Governing body: Israel Nature and Parks Authority

Rosh HaNikra or Hanikra (Hebrew: ראש הנקרה, lit. 'head of the cavern'; Arabic: رأس الناقورة, romanized: Rās an-Naqūrah) is a geologic formation in northwest Israel on the border with Lebanon, located on the coast of the Mediterranean Sea, in the Western Galilee. It is a white chalk cliff face which opens up into spectacular grottos.

The Rosh HaNikra grottoes are cavernous hollows formed by sea action on the soft chalk rock. Their total length is about 200 meters. They branch off in various directions, with some interconnecting segments. A man-made tunnel was built by the British for the Haifa-Beirut railroad line, and in 1968 a second one was dug, both connecting the grottoes with each other and allowing access (currently: only exit) along the former route of the British railroad. For many years, though, the only access to the grottoes was from the sea, and the native swimmers and divers were the only ones capable of visiting. The 400-meter-long tunnel dug in 1968 between the grottoes and slightly above sea level allowed easier access, and soon after, a cable car was built to take visitors down from the top of the cliff to the caverns and tunnels. With a 60-degree gradient, this cable car is advertised as the steepest in the world.

A kibbutz, also named Rosh HaNikra, is located nearby. The Israeli city Nahariya is located about 10 km (6 miles) south of Rosh HaNikra.

== History ==
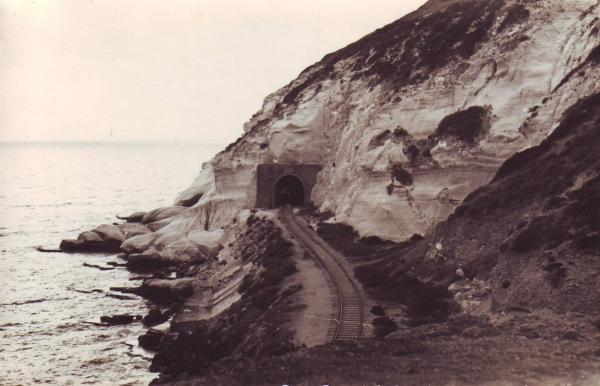
The former British Cairo-Istanbul railway tunnel photographed in 1964.

=== Hebrew Bible to Roman period ===
The Book of Joshua mentions "Misraphot Mayim" as a place south of Rosh HaNikra that was the border of the Israelite tribes of the time. In the First Book of the Maccabees, the "Ladder of Tyre" is referred to as the northern border of the territory under the governorship of Simon Maccabaeus in 144 BCE (1 Maccabees 11:59). Josephus Flavius also describes Rosh Hanikra as the northern border of the city of Acre. (The Jewish War 2, 10, 2). The archaeological tell is today situated within the kibbutz.

In the First Book of Maccabees (1 Macc 11:59), a cape in this region is referred to as the "Ladder of Tyre" (Hebrew: סולם צור; Greek: Η κλίμαξ Τύρου); the author could have meant either the cliffs at Rosh HaNikra, or one of two other capes jutting out into the sea slightly north or south of them. The site was later named an-Nawakir ("The Grottoes") by the Arabs.

=== WWII and after: railway and conflicts ===
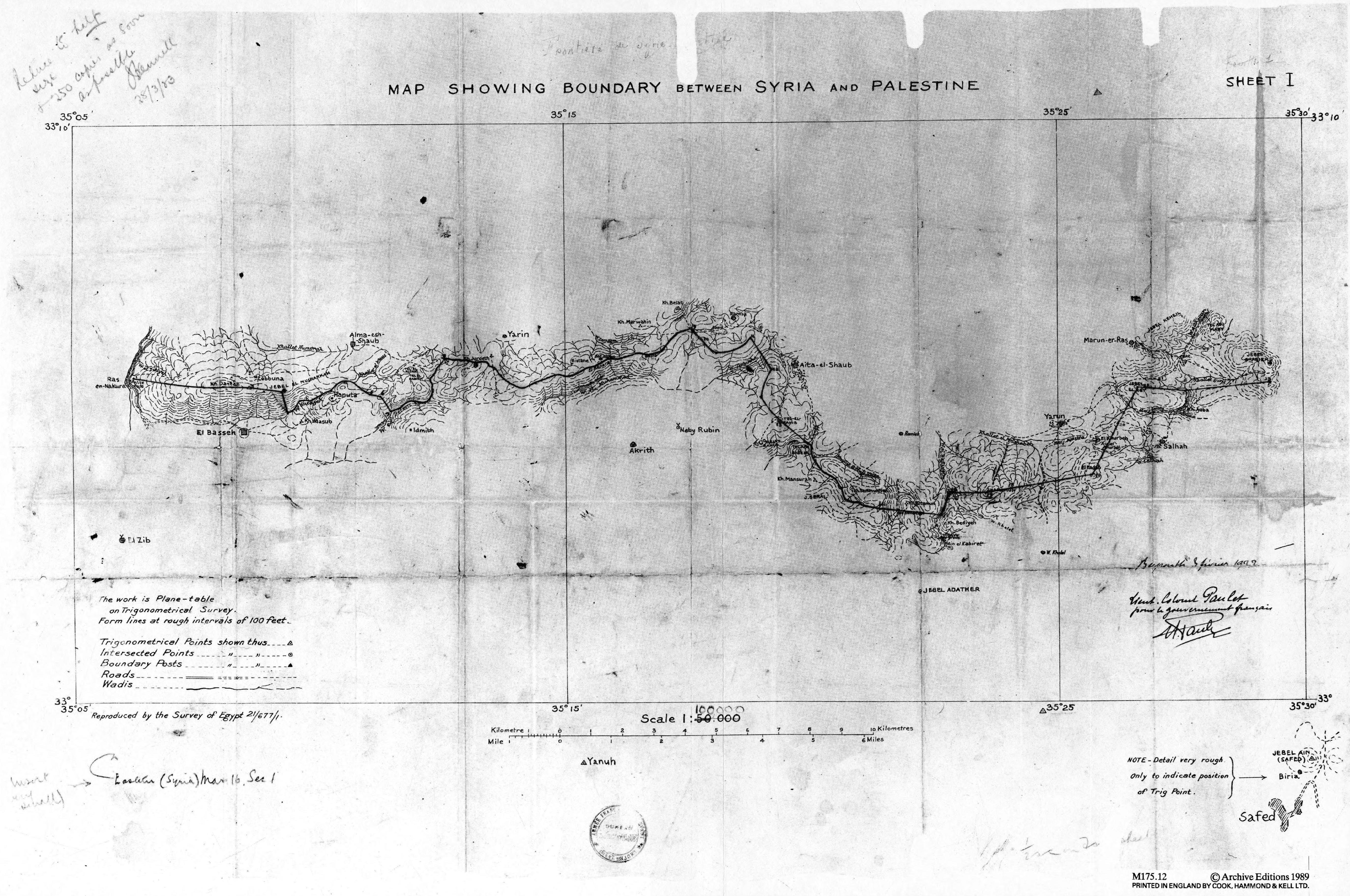
The Paulet–Newcombe Agreement showing Ras en-Nakura as the far left point on the boundary between Palestine and Syria.

Rosh HaNikra has served as a passage point for trade caravans and armies between Lebanon, Syria, Israel, Egypt, and Africa. In 1942, during World War II, after the Allied capture of Vichy-ruled Lebanon, the Haifa-Acre extension of the Hijaz Railway was further expanded into Lebanon for military purposes, which also entailed quarrying the tunnels at Ras el-Nakurah. This allowed for a railway connection between Haifa and the cities of Cairo to the south and Beirut to the north, the latter already being connected to Turkey and Iraq, or to Damascus and then via the Hijaz line to Amman. It was the South African contingent who blasted the tunnels.

The railway bridge at Rosh HaNikra was spared by the Haganah during the 1946 Night of the Bridges operation but, following a late-1947 British announcement that it would withdraw from Palestine months ahead of schedule, the bridge was destroyed by the 21st Battalion under the Palmach in late February 1948 to hinder Lebanese arms shipments to Arab forces opposing the UN Partition Plan. As repairs were prohibitively expensive, the tunnels were later completely sealed. The Lebanese railways have been largely dismantled while the Coastal Railway in Israel currently ends near Nahariya, several kilometers to the south.

The management of the Cairo-Jaffa-Haifa-Beirut railway apologizes to passengers.
The clock is broken, the track worn down, the locomotive tired, the weeds high, the fuel expensive, the engineer asleep, the tunnel at Rosh Hanikra blocked.
And one more little detail — peace is running late.
But don’t give up: The train is coming. It’ll be just a few more minutes.

Rosh Hanikra was the location where Israeli and Lebanese officials negotiated and concluded an armistice agreement in 1949 which ended the Lebanese-Israeli component of the 1948 War of Israeli Independence. A border passage across the Blue Line into Lebanon at the site is sometimes used by UNIFIL personnel.

Today, the tunnels remain completely sealed. A poem is mounted on the Israeli side, yearning for peace with Lebanon.

== Nature reserves and national park ==
The area around the cape of Rosh HaNikra includes a number of nature reserves:

- The Rosh HaNikra islands - 311 dunams declared in 1965
- The Rosh HaNikra reserve - 500 dunams declared in 1969, and an additional 765 dunams in 1996
- Rosh HaNikra beach - 230 dunams, declared in 2003

The Rosh HaNikra national park also has jurisdiction of 220 dunams in the area.

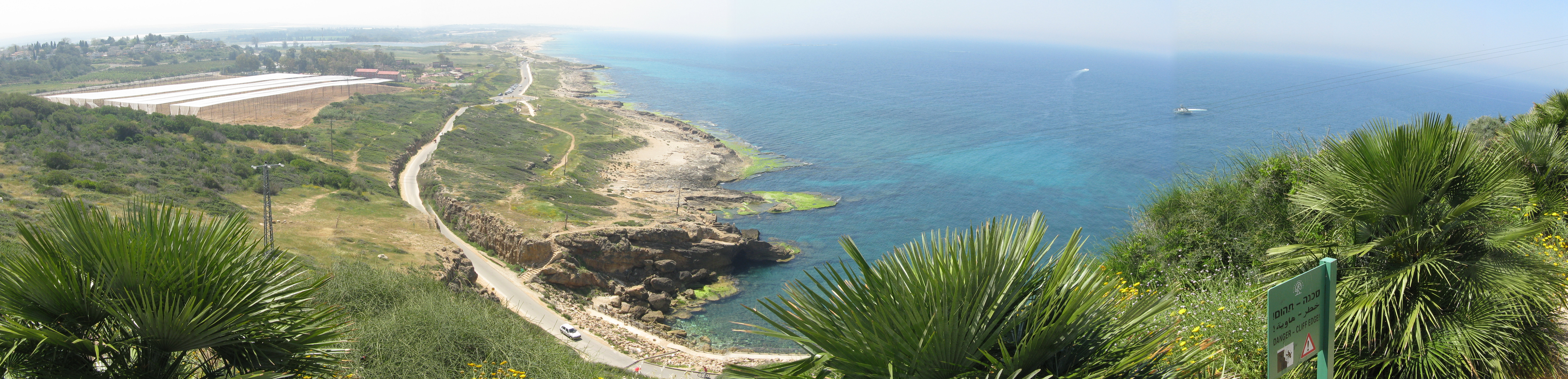
Former British railway route carved into the ridge, now a road, and farmland looking south from Rosh HaNikra

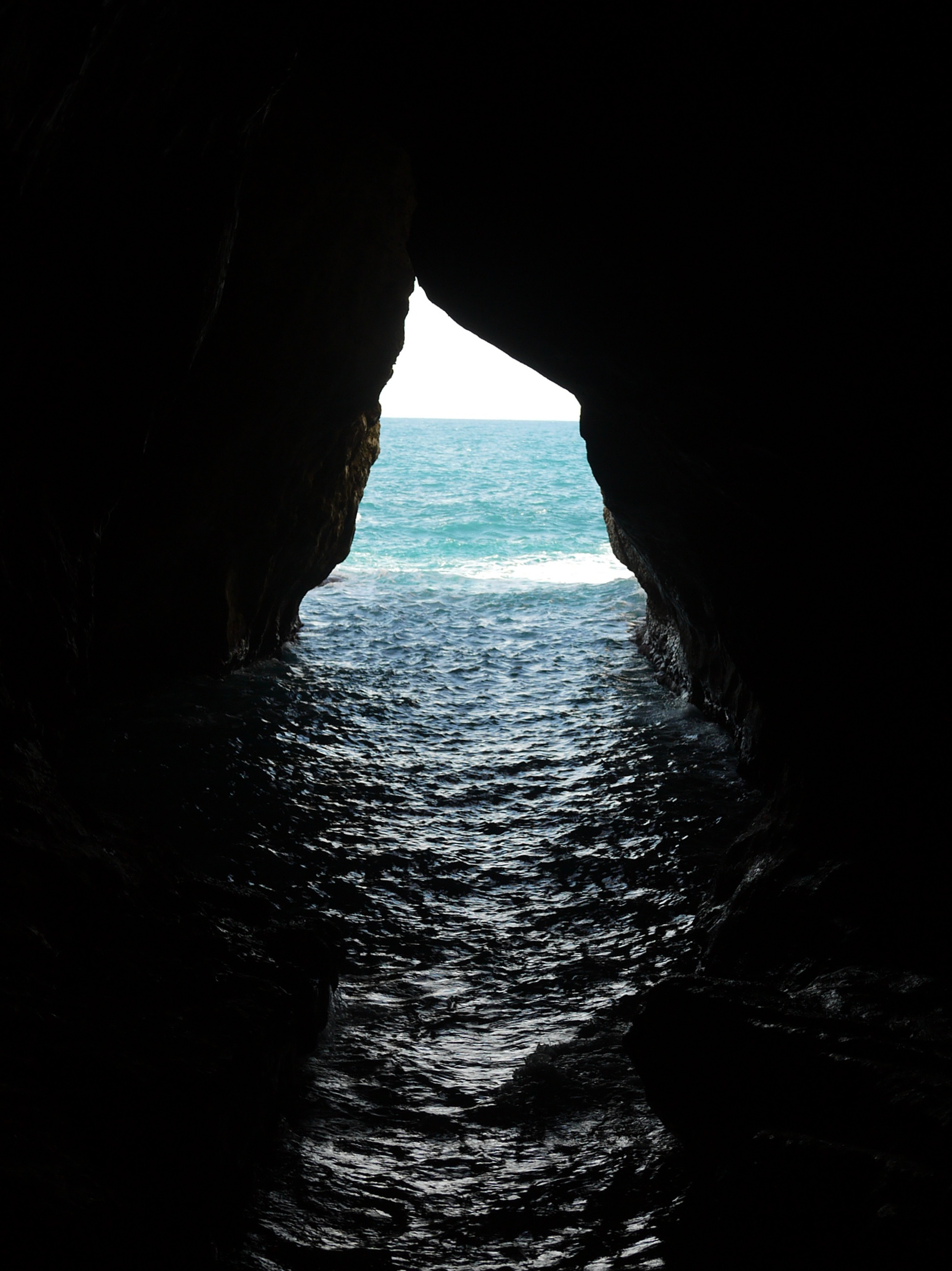
View from Rosh HaNikra grotto toward the sea

== Cable car ==
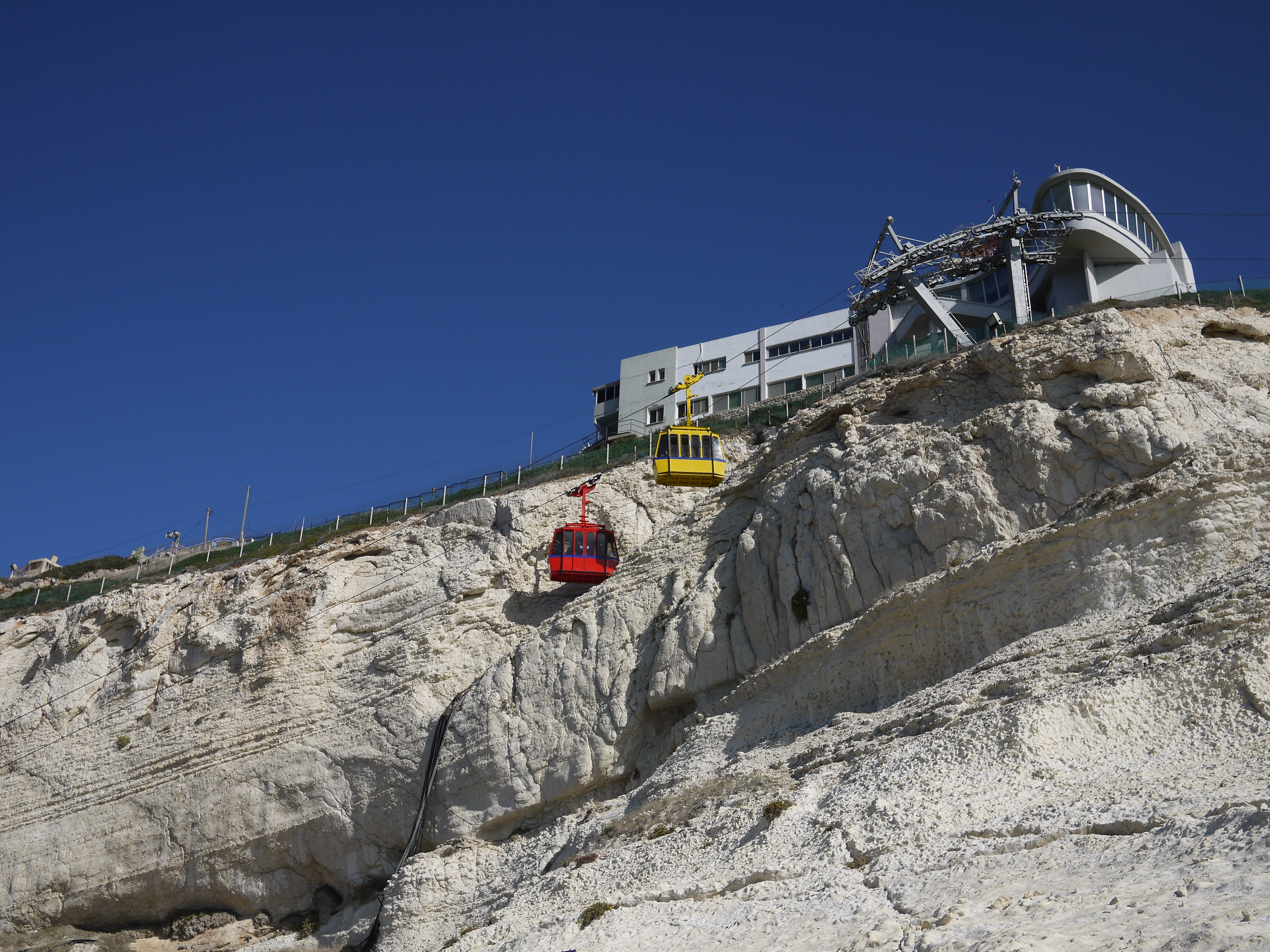
Doppelmayr Cable-car in Rosh Hanikra, claimed to be the steepest cable car in the world, with a gradient of 60°

The Rosh HaNikra cable car is a cable car serving tourists wishing to visit the grottoes. The cable car is situated very close to the Lebanese border. The site is popular with tourists, and is one of the facilities available for tourists in Kibbutz Rosh HaNikra. The cable car was manufactured by Austrian manufacturer Doppelmayr Garaventa Group, and claims to be the steepest cable car in the world, ascending at a gradient of 60 degrees. The base station is located on the sea, and the cable car is occasionally affected by stormy weather. The Israeli Sign Language sign for Rosh HaNikra derives from this cable car, as it emulates its motion.

== See also ==
- Geography of Israel
- Hiking in Israel
- Kurkar
- Tourism in Israel

== Gallery ==
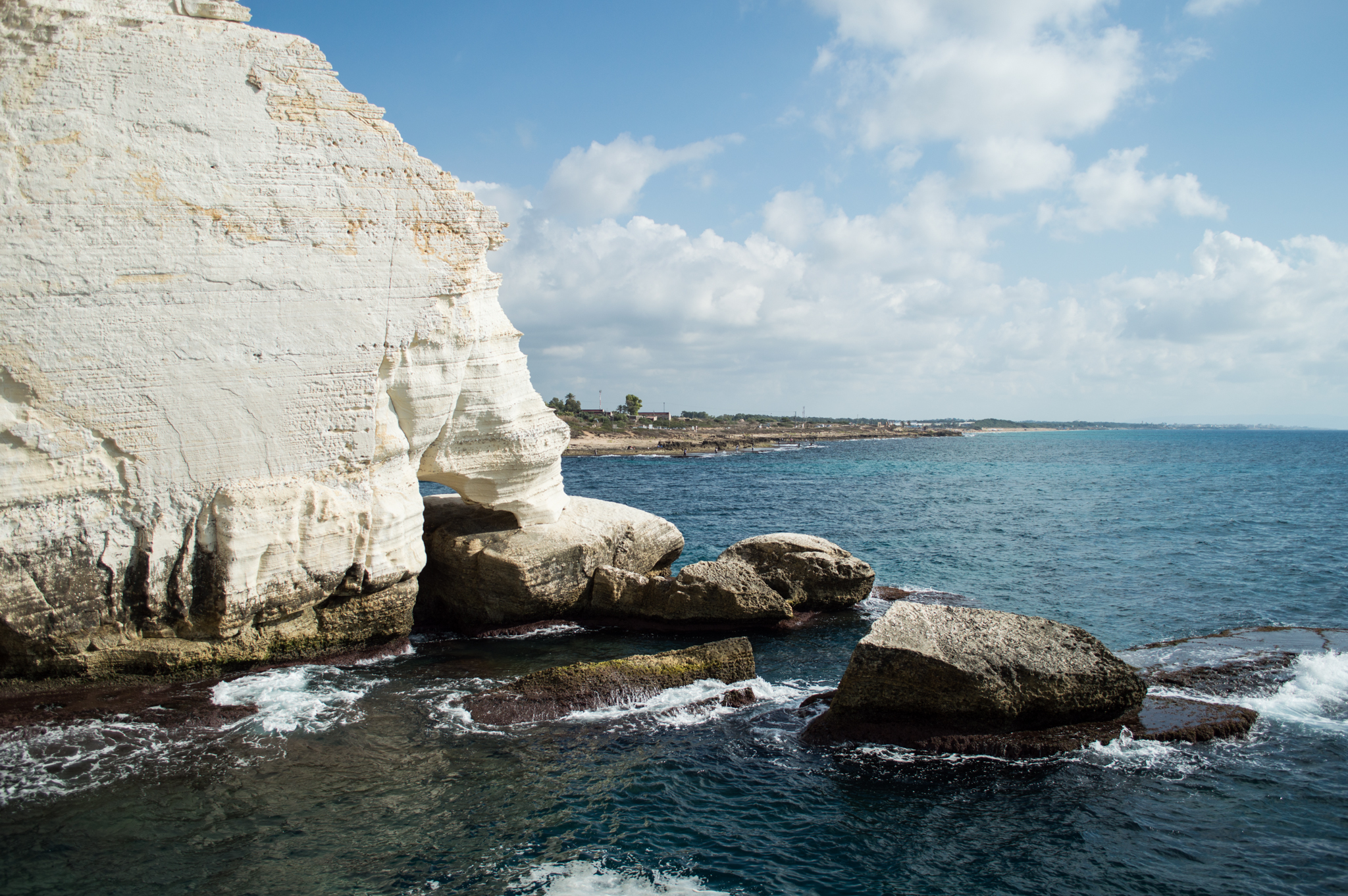

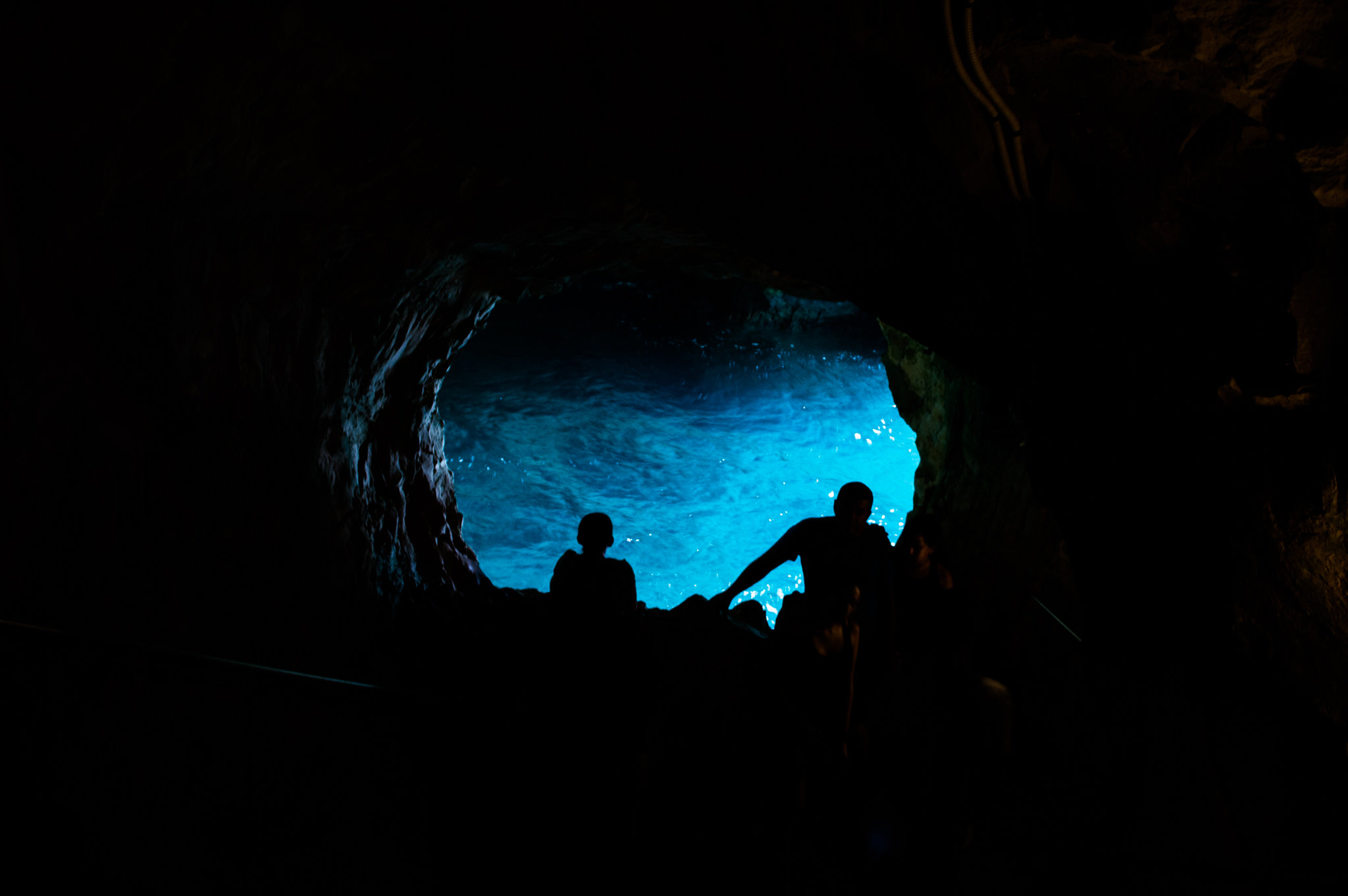

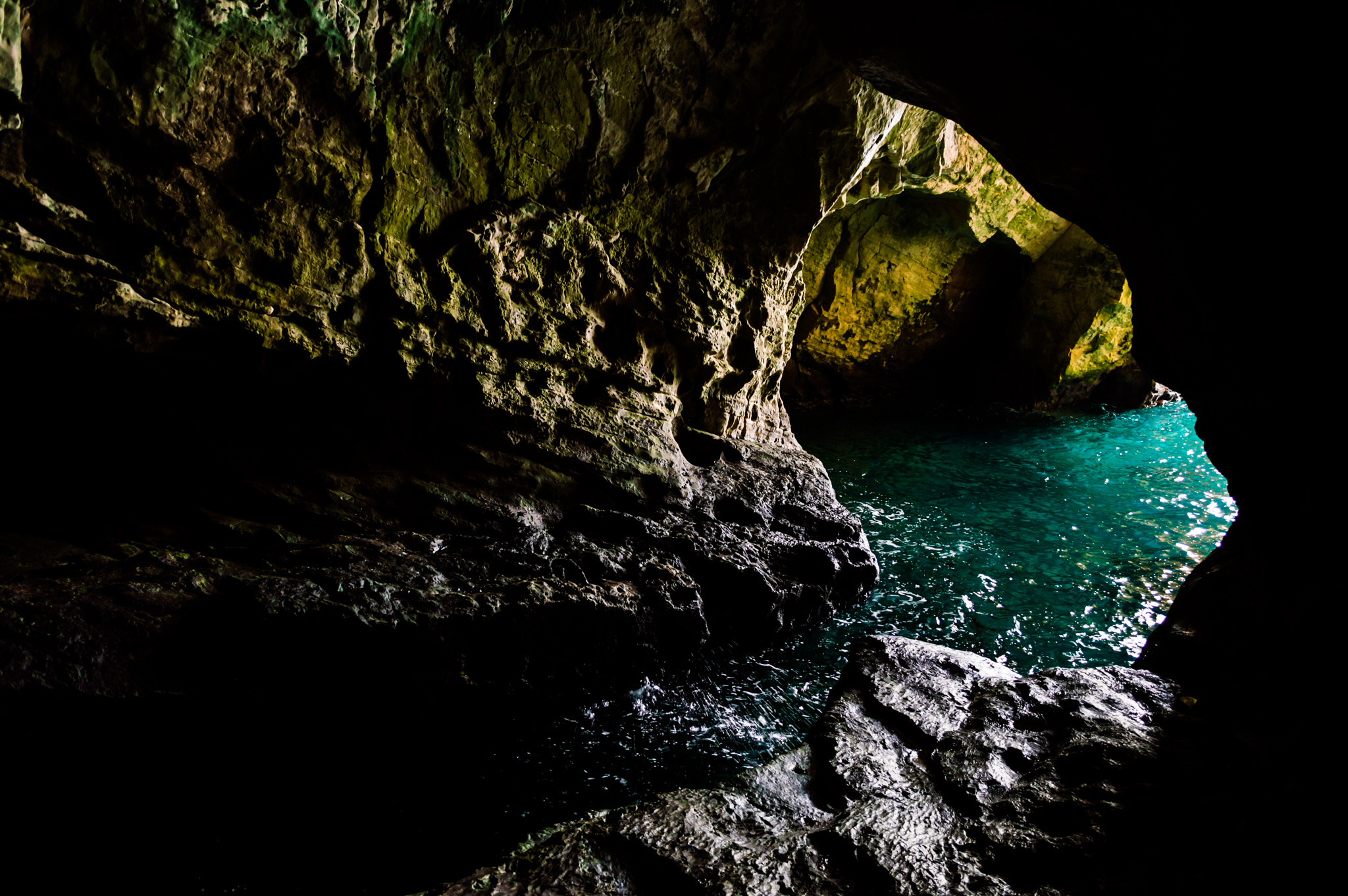

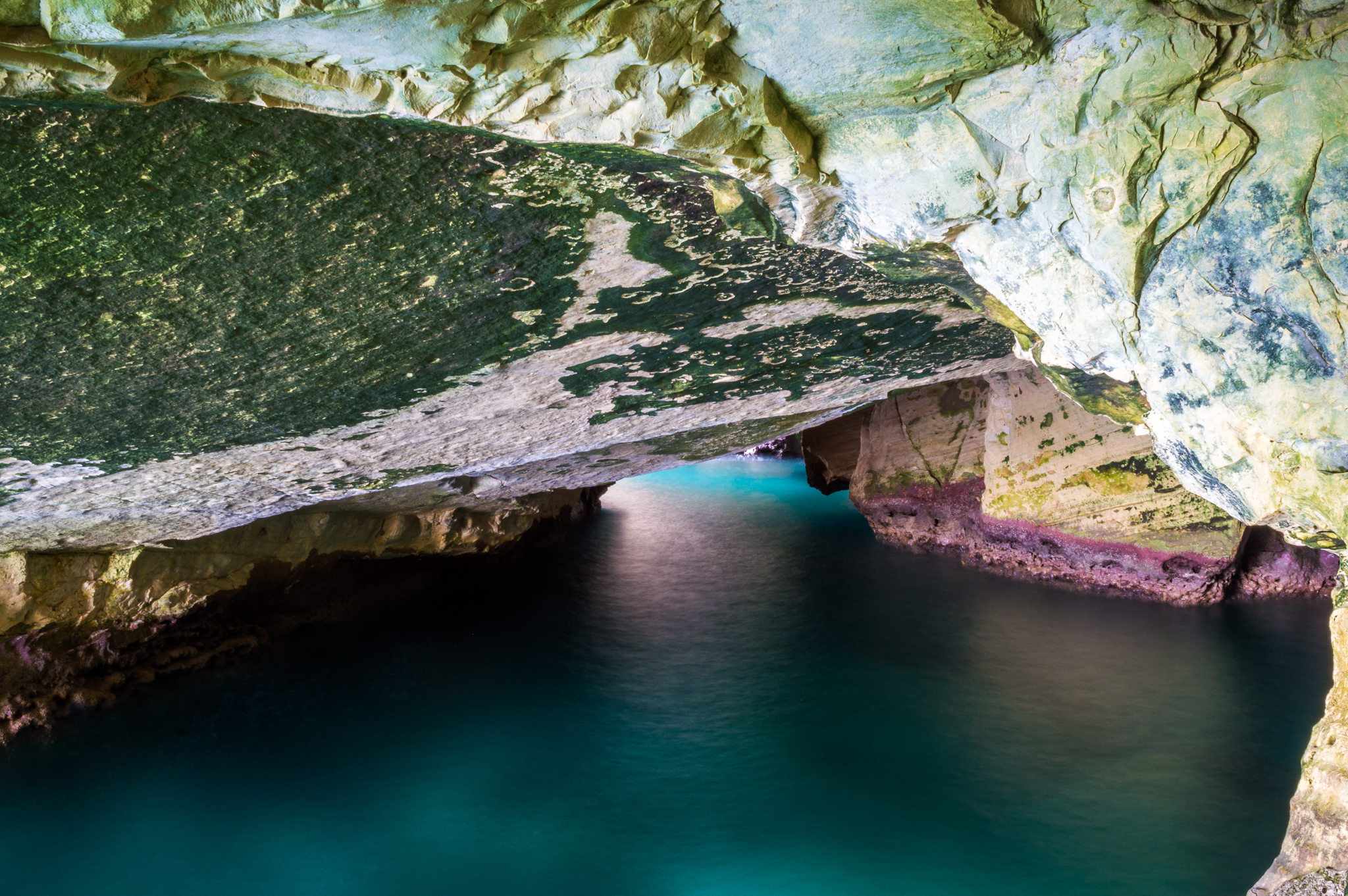

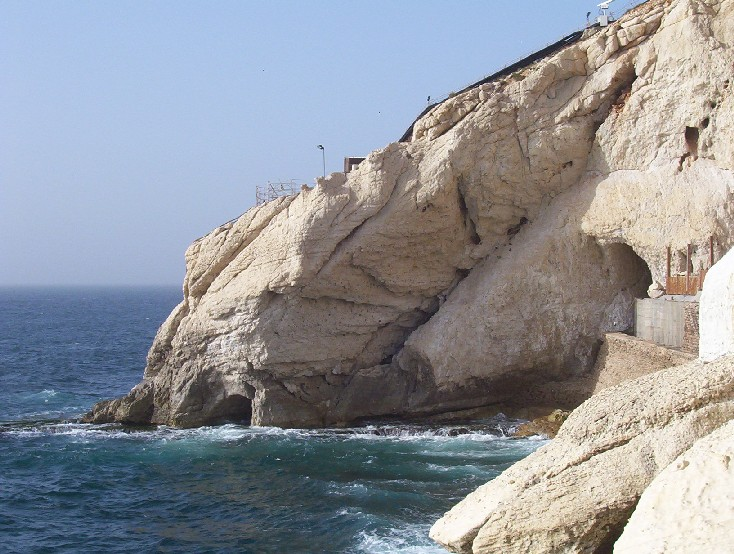

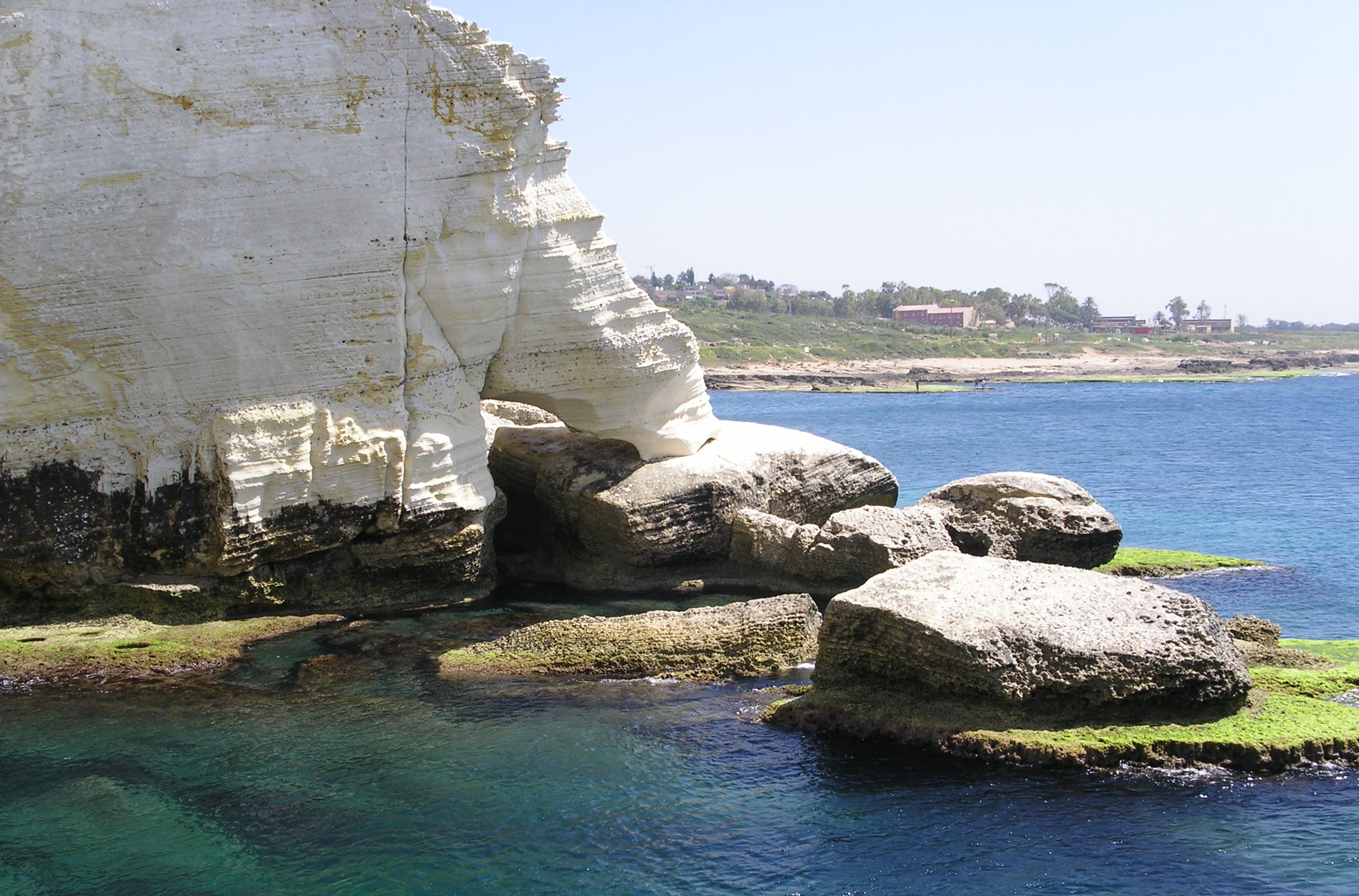

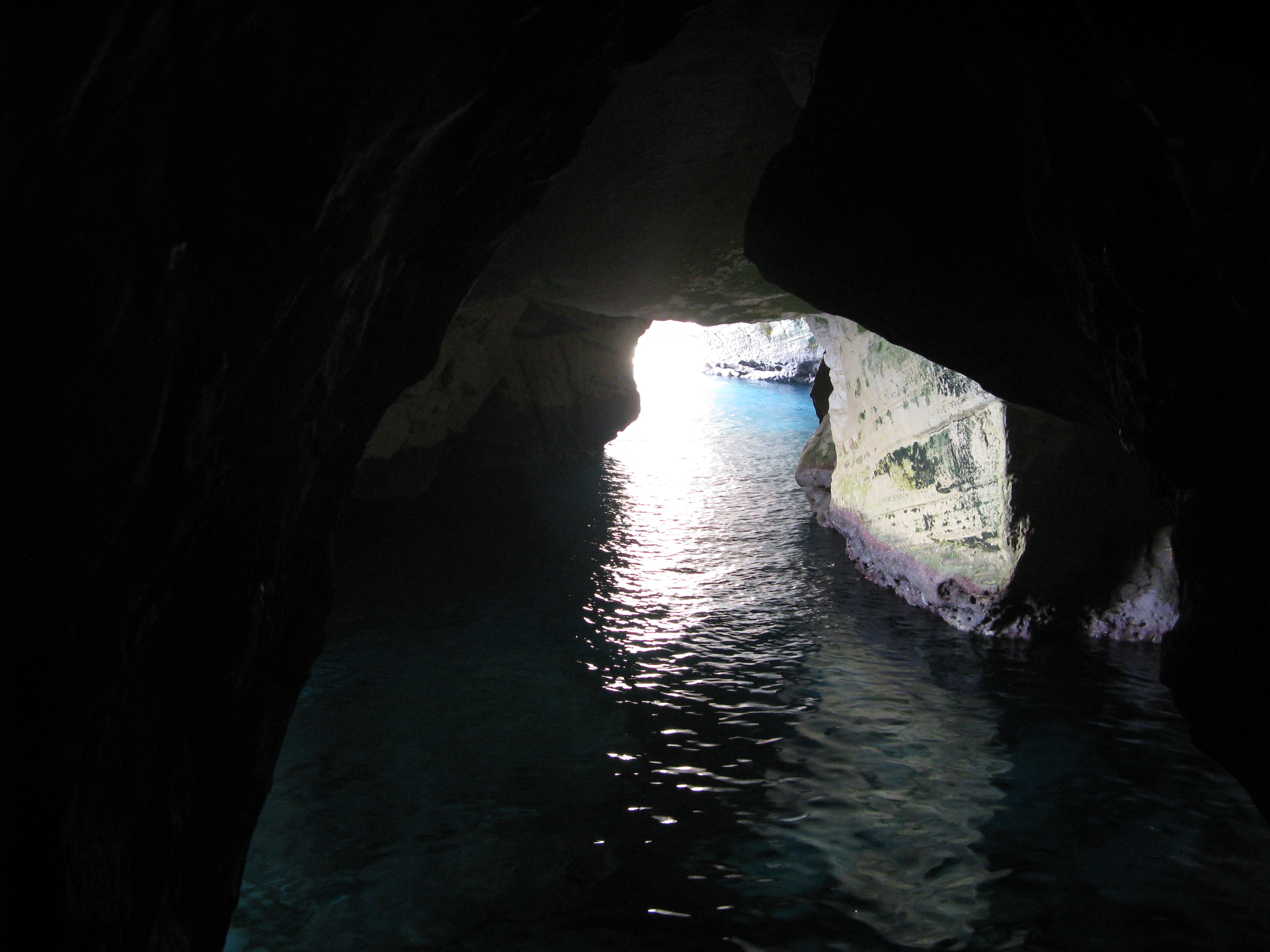
