= Rosh HaNikra Crossing =

Lebanon-Israel Border

Rosh HaNikra Crossing מעבר ראש הנקרה معبر رأس الناقورة
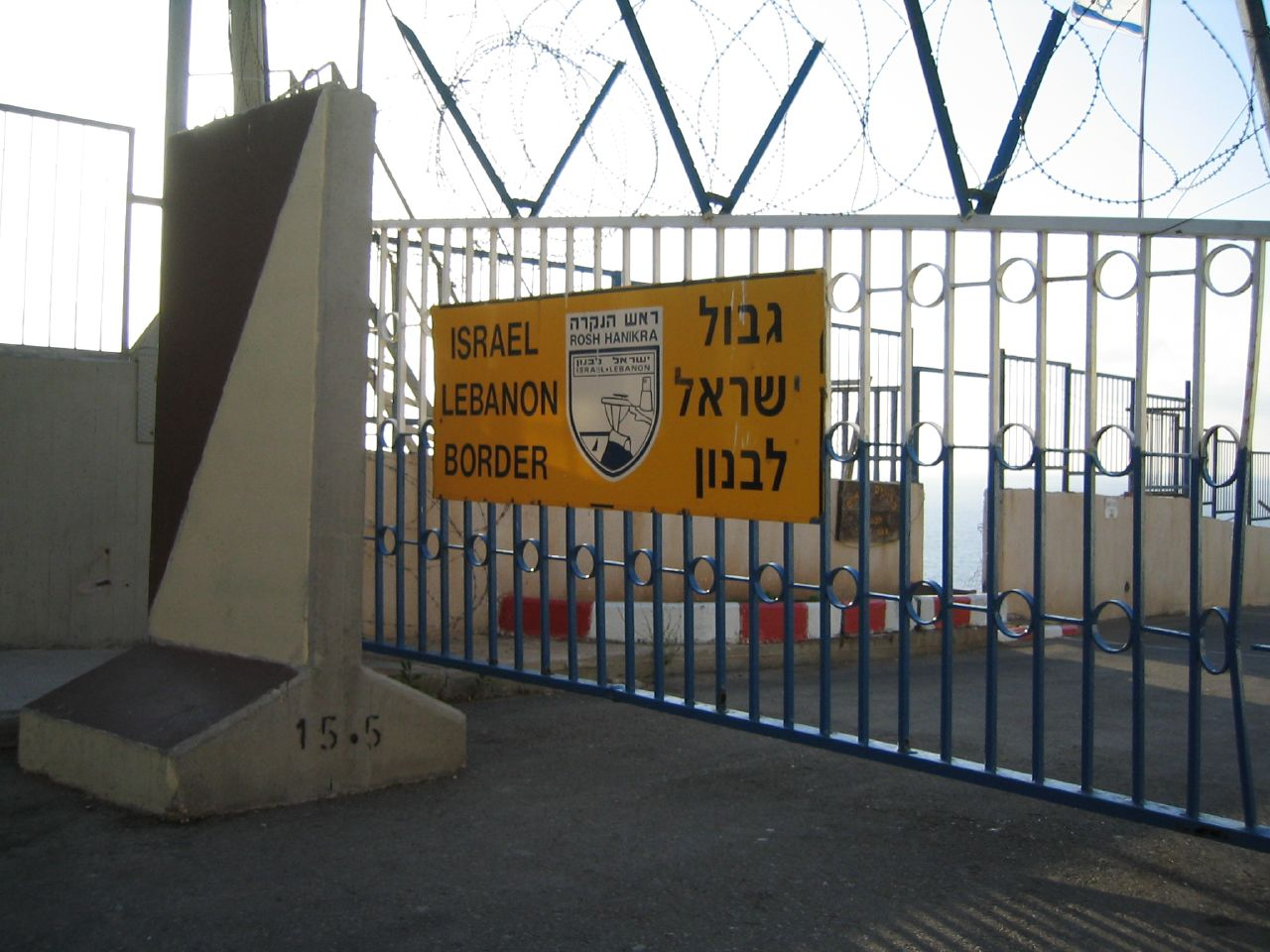
- Israeli side of crossing
- Coordinates: 33°05′39″N 35°06′17″E
- Crosses: Blue Line
- Locale: Rosh HaNikra, Israel; Naqoura, Lebanon
- Maintained by: UNIFIL; IDF

The Rosh HaNikra Crossing (Hebrew: מעבר ראש הנקרה), also known as Ras Al Naqoura Crossing (Arabic: معبر رأس الناقورة), is an international border crossing between Naqoura, Lebanon and Rosh HaNikra, Israel. The terminal is operated solely by the United Nations Interim Force in Lebanon and the Israel Defense Forces. The passage of regular tourists/visitors is forbidden.

== Use ==
The crossing has been used twice during the summation of negotiations between Israel and Hezbollah. On 16 July 2008 it was used by Israel to send Samir Kuntar back to Lebanon and for Hezbollah to return the bodies of Israeli soldiers Eldad Regev and Ehud Goldwasser.

After the release of passengers and crew from the 2010 Gaza flotilla raid, Israel deported four Lebanese activists via the crossing on 3 June 2010. Abbas Nasser, Hussein Shukur, Andre Abi Khalil and Hani Suleiman crossed the border at about 10.30 pm where they were met by a huge crowd, waving the Lebanese, Palestinian and Turkish flags and throwing rice and flowers.

== Border incident ==
On December 15, 2013, an Israeli soldier was shot and killed by a Lebanese soldier.

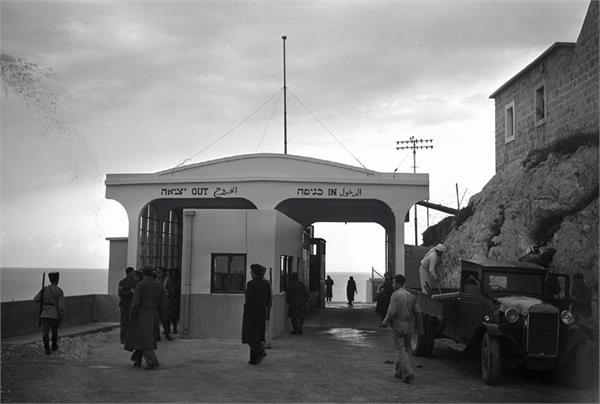
Rosh HaNikra 1939

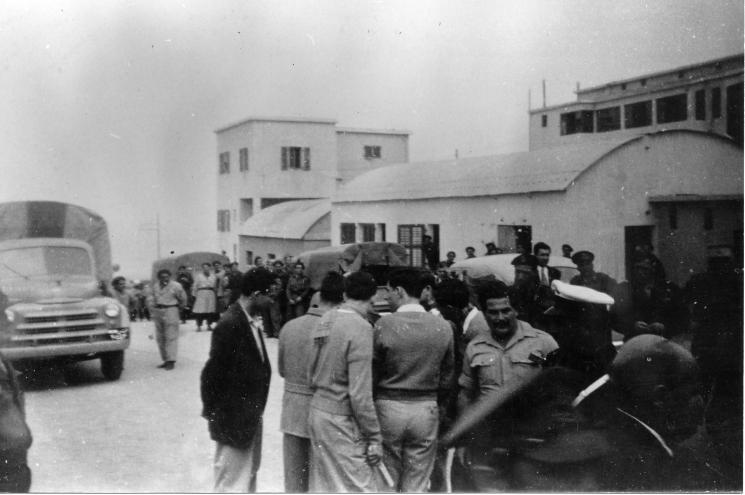
IDF prisoners being released from Lebanon at Rosh HaNikra, 23 March 1949
