= Rosh HaNikra (kibbutz) =

Rosh HaNikra: ראש הנקרה (Hebrew)
- kibbutz
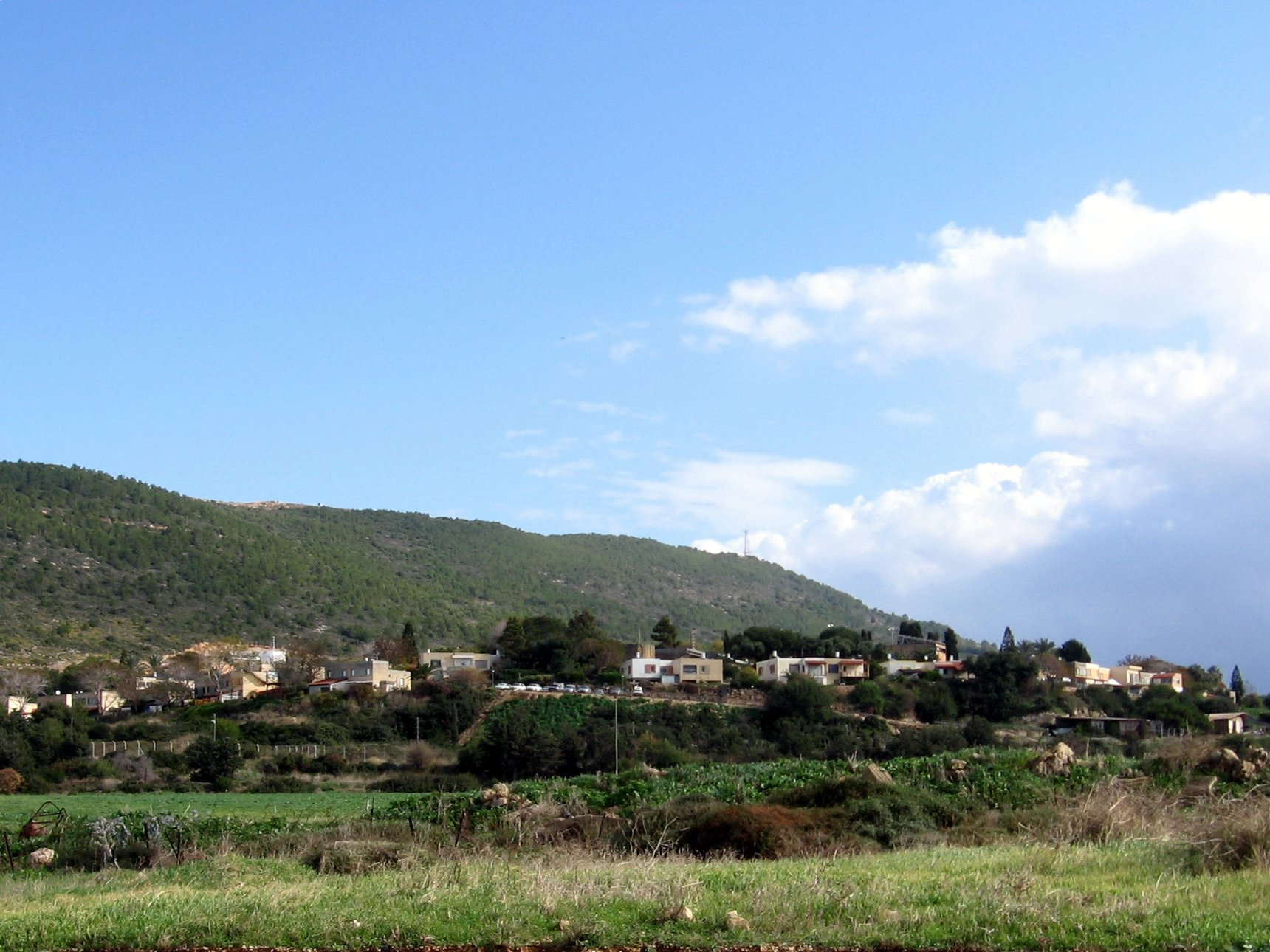
- Etymology: Head of the Grottoes
- Location within Northwest Israel Location within Israel
- Coordinates: 33°5′10″N 35°6′59″E
- Country: Israel
- District: Northern
- Subdistrict: Acre
- Council: Mateh Asher
- Affiliation: Kibbutz Movement
- Founded: 6 January 1949
- Founder: Demobilised Palmach members
- Population (2024): 1,383
- Website: www.rosh-hanikra.com

Rosh HaNikra (Hebrew: ראש הנקרה, lit. 'Head of the Grottoes') is a kibbutz in northern Israel. Located on the Mediterranean coast near the Rosh HaNikra grottoes and the border with Lebanon, it falls under the jurisdiction of Mateh Asher Regional Council. In 2024 it had a population of 1,383.

== History ==
The kibbutz was established on 6 January 1949 by a gar'in of demobilised Palmach soldiers who moved there from kibbutz Hanita, along with Zionist youth movement members and young Holocaust survivors. It was built near al-Bassa, which was depopulated in the 1948 Arab–Israeli War.

=== 2023 Israel–Gaza war ===
During the Gaza war, northern Israeli border communities, including Rosh HaNikra, faced targeted attacks by Hezbollah and Palestinian factions based in Lebanon, and were evacuated.

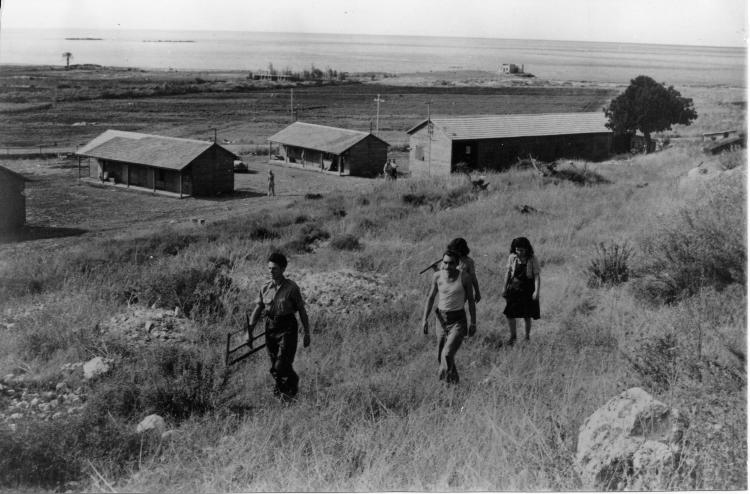
Original buildings at Rosh Hanikra, 1949

In January 2024, Hezbollah released a video of a strike on the Israeli naval base at Rosh Hanikra, on the border with Lebanon, saying it had used an Almas missile. Several subsequent videos over the spring 2024 also show to deploy the guided missile against Israeli targets.

== Economy ==
The kibbutz grows bananas and avocados, and raises turkeys. In 1974, kibbutz members founded a biotechnology company called Rahan Meristem, which included the first commercial tissue culture laboratory in the country. Rahan developed new procedures for large scale, in-vitro, clonal propagation of over 200 plant genera including ornamental, industrial, fruit, and vegetable crops. In the mid-1980s, in-vitro propagated banana plants became the leading product. Rahan is now a center of research and consultation for the banana industry throughout the world.

A formal R&D department was established in 1991 to provide technical support. Areas of expertise include molecular and classical genetics, plant cell and tissue culture, plant biochemistry and physiology, bacteriology and industrial biotechnology. Methods have also been developed for the control of contaminating microbes, early detection and elimination of somaclonal variation, reduction of labor and fixed costs in production, etc.

In the early 21st century, the kibbutz was privatized.

== Notable people ==
- Sacha Baron Cohen, English actor, comedian, screenwriter, and producer
- Nufar Edelman (born 1982), Olympic sailor
- Eitan Friedlander (born 1958), Olympic sailor
- Dekel Keinan, Israeli footballer

== See also ==
- Agricultural research in Israel
- Rosh Hanikra Islands
