= Beit She'an =

Neolithic settlement; city in Israel

Beit She'an בֵּית שְׁאָן Beth-Shean Beisan
- City

Hebrew transcription(s)
  - ISO 259: Beit Šˀan
  - Translit.: Bet Šəʼan
  - Also spelled: Bet She'an (official); Beth Shean (unofficial)
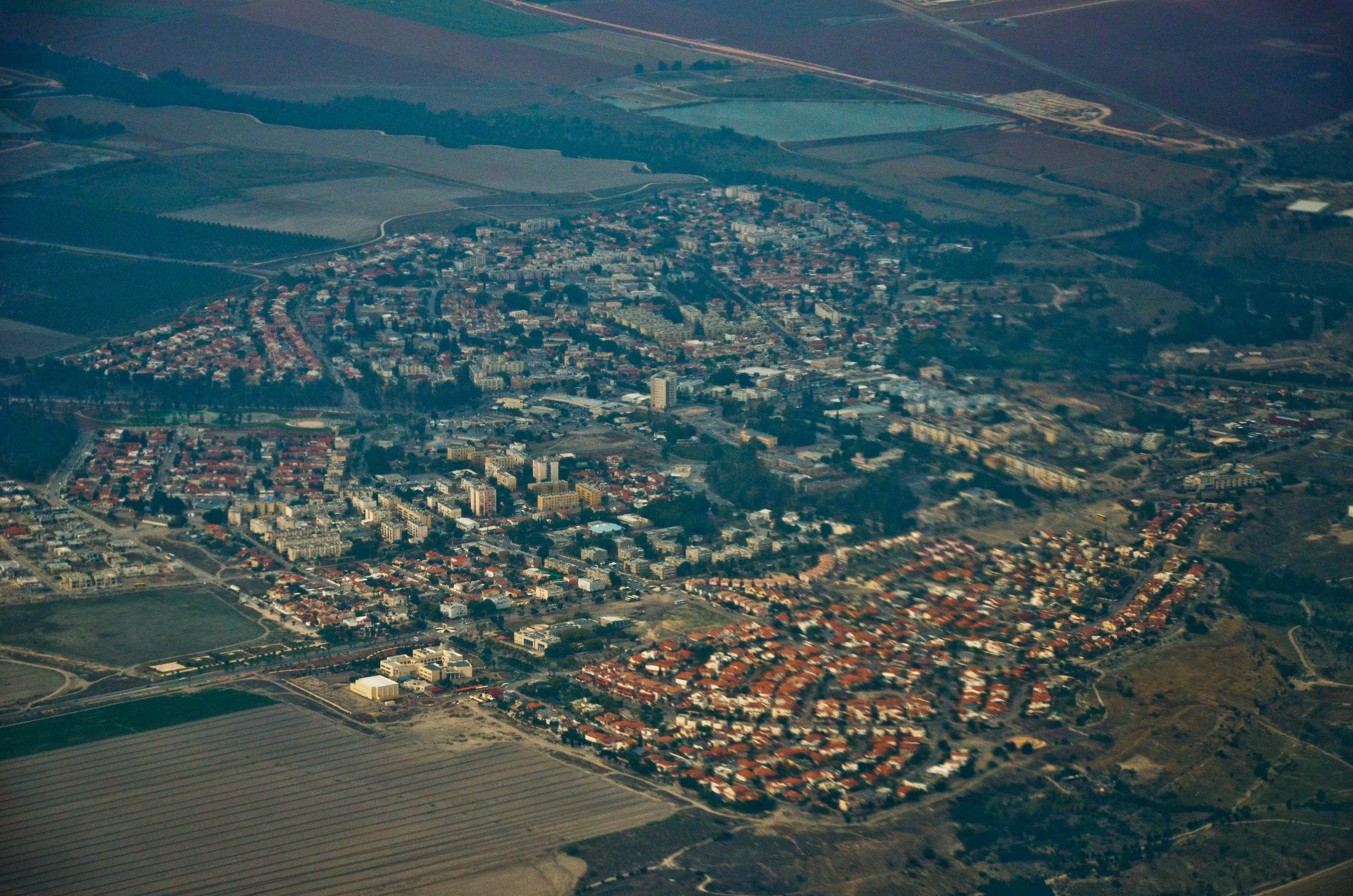
- Beit She'an

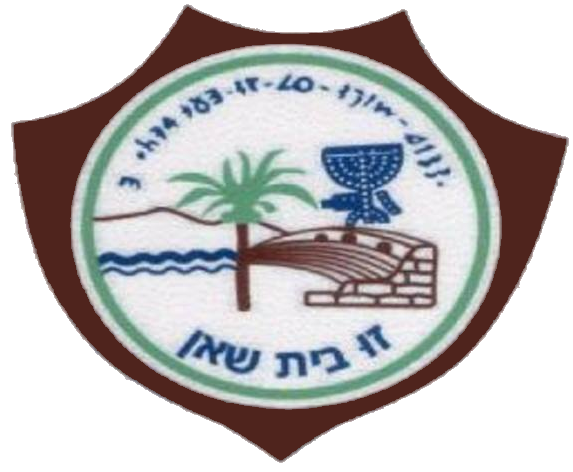

- Location within Jezreel Valley region of Israel Location within Israel
- Coordinates: 32°30′N 35°30′E
- Country: Israel
- District: Northern
- Subdistrict: Jezreel
- Natural Region: Bet She'an Valley
- Founded: 6th–5th millennia BCE (Earliest settlement); Bronze Age (Canaanite town)

Government
  - Mayor: Noam Juma'a

Area
  - Total: 7,330 dunams (7.33 km^{2}; 2.83 sq mi)

Population (2024)
  - Total: 20,252
  - Density: 2,760/km^{2} (7,160/sq mi)
- Name meaning: House of Tranquillity
- Website: http://www.bet-shean.org.il

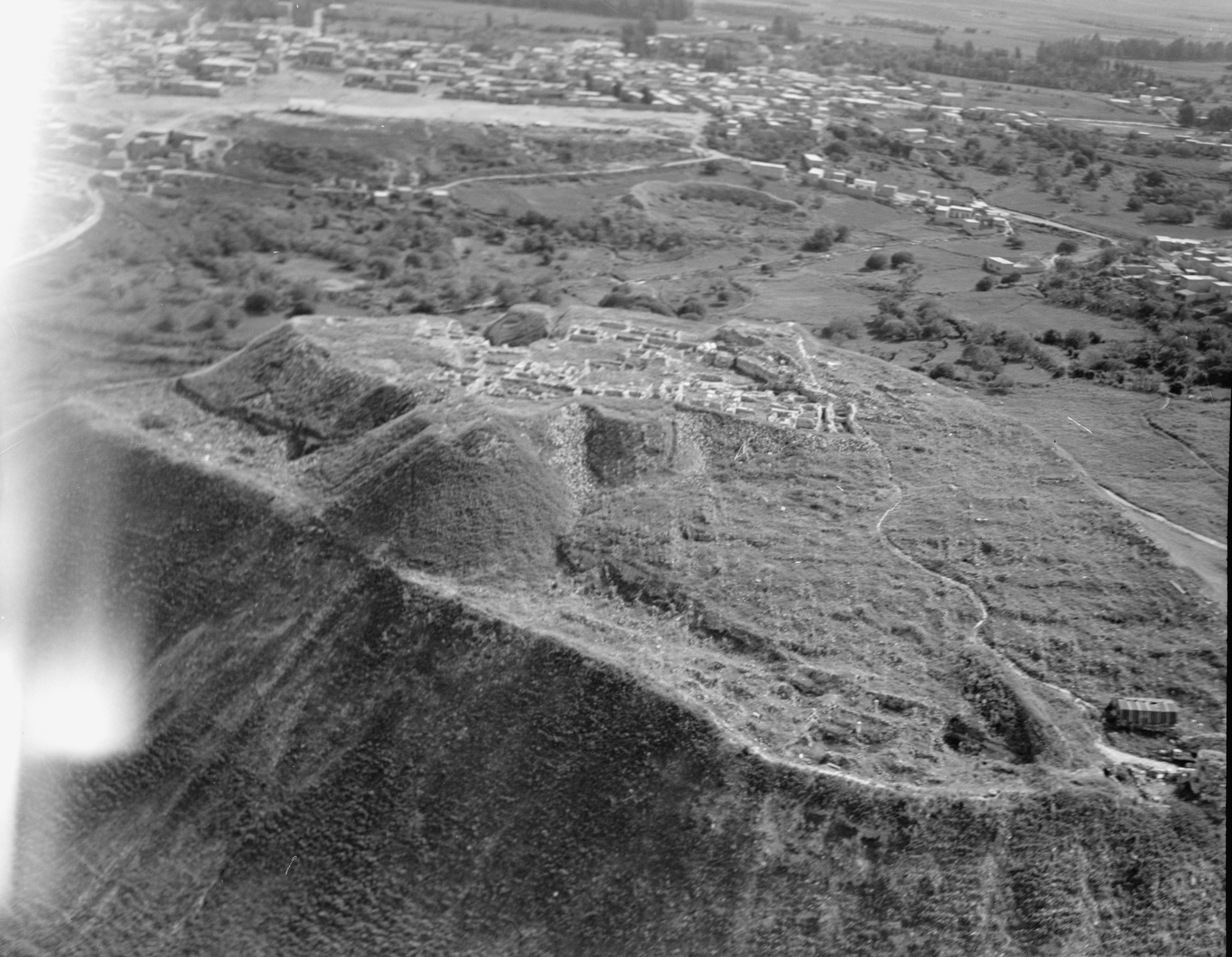
Archaeological excavation at Tell Beth Shean in 1937. The town is seen at the top half of the picture

Beit She'an or Beth-Shean (Hebrew: בֵּית שְׁאָן Bēṯ Šəʾān), also known as Beisan (Arabic: بيسان Bīsān), is a city in the Northern District of Israel. The town lies at the Beit She'an Valley about 120 m (394 feet) below sea level. In 2022, 98% of the population was Jewish and 2% was counted as other.

Beit She'an is believed to be one of the oldest cities in the region. It has played an important role in history due to its geographical location at the junction of the Jordan River Valley and the Jezreel Valley. Beth She'an's ancient tell contains remains beginning in the Chalcolithic period. When Canaan came under Imperial Egyptian rule in the Late Bronze Age, Beth She'an served as a major Egyptian administrative center. The city came under Israelite rule in the monarchic period. It probably fell under Philistine control during the time of Saul, when, according to the Bible, his body was displayed there along with his sons.

During the Hellenistic period, the settlement was known as Scythopolis (Ancient Greek: Σκυθόπολις). After the region came under Roman rule, Scythopolis gained imperial free status and was the leading city of the Decapolis. A multi-cultural metropolis under Byzantine rule, it served as the capital of the province of Palaestina Secunda, and had a mixed population of Christians, Jews, Samaritans and pagans. After the Arab conquest of the Levant, and following a series of devastating earthquakes (most notably in 749), the city lost its prominence, and became a medium-sized country town.

The population of the town was completely changed from 1948 to 1950. It had been entirely Muslim and Christian, designated to be part of the Jewish state in the 1947 United Nations Partition Plan for Palestine, and was captured by the Haganah in May 1948. The battle over the town during Operation Gideon caused most of its inhabitants to flee, and the remainder were expelled as part of the 1948 Palestinian expulsion and flight. The town was then resettled by Jewish immigrants. Today, Beit She'an serves as a regional centre for the towns in the Beit She'an Valley. The ancient city ruins are now protected within the Beit She'an National Park. The town is located near the Jordan River Crossing, one of three crossing points between Israel and Jordan.

== Geography ==
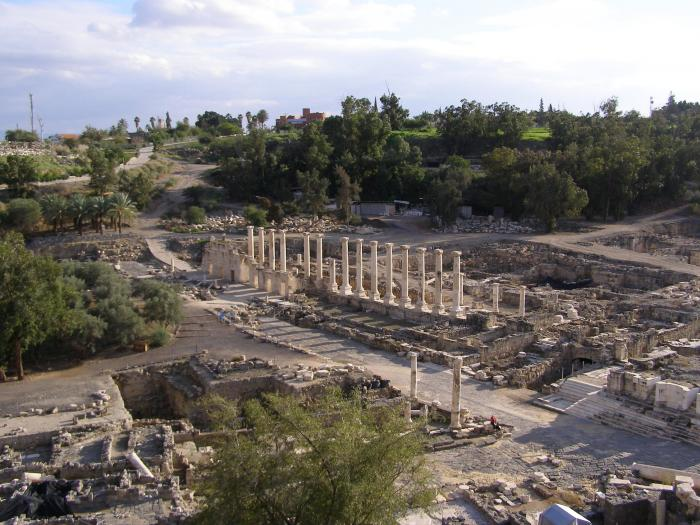
Ancient ruins of Beit She'an

Beit She'an's location has always been strategically significant, due to its position at the junction of the Jordan River Valley and the Jezreel Valley, essentially controlling access from Jordan and the inland to the coast, as well as from Jerusalem and Jericho to the Galilee.

Beit She'an is situated on Highway 90, the north–south road which runs the length of the eastern edge of Israel and the West Bank. The city stretches over an area of 7 square kilometers with a substantial national park in the north of the city. Beit She'an has a population of 20,000.

Today the town is under the administration of the Emek HaMa'ayanot Regional Council.

== Climate ==
Beit She'an has a hot semi-arid climate, with mild, rainy winters and very hot, dry summers. Beit She'an is one of the hottest cities in Israel, due to its location in Beit She'an valley, which is part of the Jordan Valley. The annual precipitation is 305 mm, making it the driest city in Northern Israel. The cause of the relative aridity is the location in the rain shadow of the Samaria mountains and Mount Gilboa, which blocks some of the rain from reaching the area.

== History of archaeological exploration ==
The University of Pennsylvania carried out excavations of ancient Beit She'an in 1921–1933. Relics from the Egyptian period were discovered, most of them now exhibited in the Rockefeller Museum in Jerusalem. Some are in the University of Pennsylvania Museum in Philadelphia. Excavations at the site were resumed by the Hebrew University of Jerusalem in 1983 and then again from 1989 to 1996 under the direction of Amihai Mazar. The excavations have revealed no less than 18 successive ancient towns.

== History ==
=== Neolithic and Chalcolithic Ages ===
In 1933, archaeologist G.M. FitzGerald, under the auspices of the University of Pennsylvania Museum, carried out a "deep cut" on Tell el-Hisn ("castle hill"), the large tell, or mound, of Beth She'an, in order to determine the earliest occupation of the site. His results suggest that settlement began in the Late Neolithic or Early Chalcolithic periods (sixth to fifth millennia BC.) Occupation continued intermittently throughout the Late Neolithic and Chalcolithic periods, with a likely gap during the Late Chalcolithic period (ca. 4000–3300 BC).

=== Early Bronze Age ===
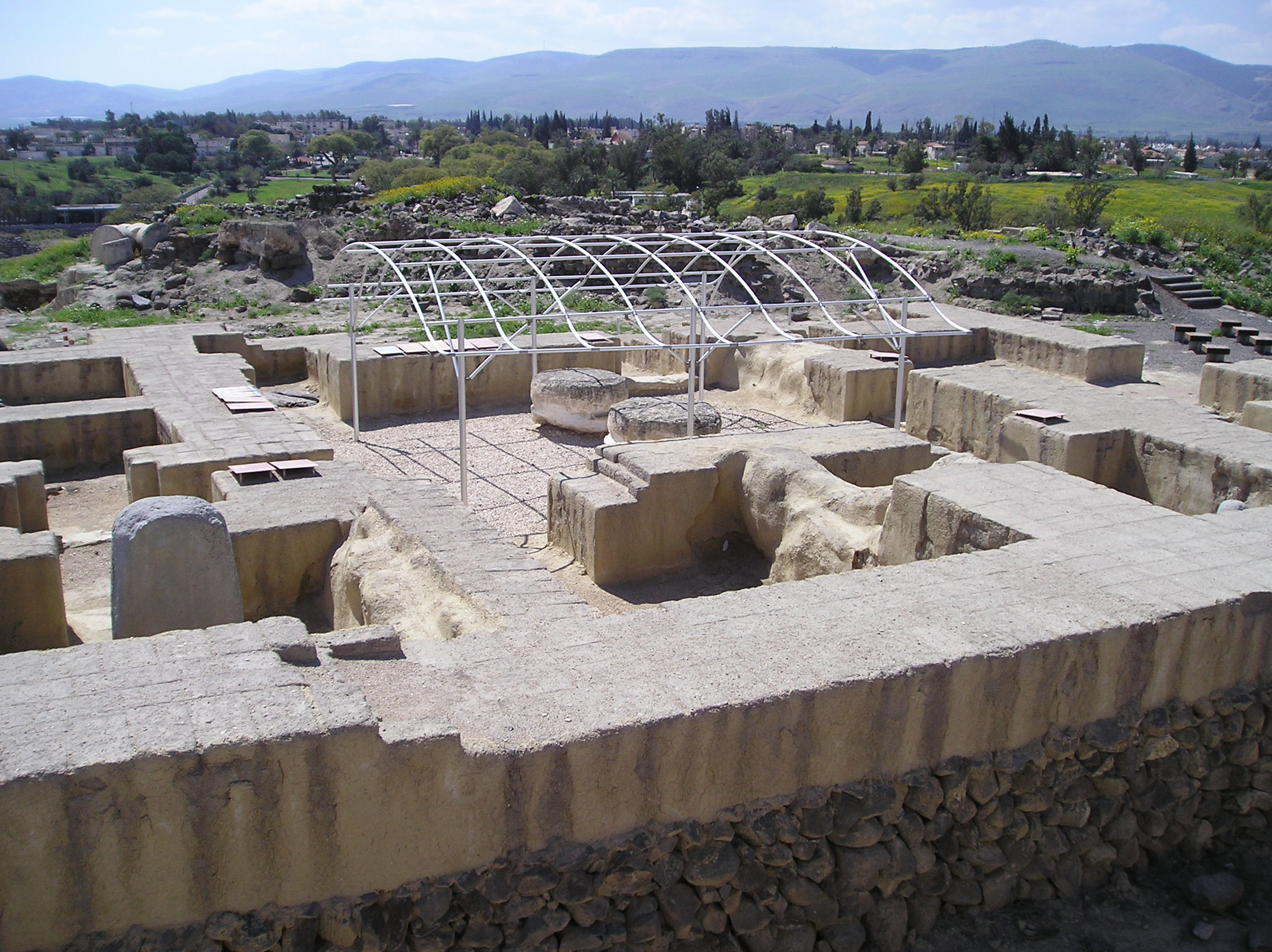
House of the Egyptian governor on Tell el-Husn

Settlement seems to have resumed at the beginning of the Early Bronze Age IB (c. 3300–3050/3000 BCE) and continues throughout this period, is then missing during the Early Bronze Age II (c. 3050/3000–2720 BCE), and then resumes in the Early Bronze Age IIIA (c. 2720–2500 BCE).

During Early Bronze IIIB (c. 2500–2350 BCE), IVA (c. 2350–2150 BCE), IVB (c. 2150–2020 BCE) there is a possible occupation gap due to drier climate conditions and periods of drought in the transitional phases.

=== Middle Bronze Age ===
A large cemetery on the northern mound was in use from the Bronze Age to Byzantine times. Canaanite graves dating from 2000 to 1600 BCE were discovered there in 1926.

The Middle Bronze I (c. 2020–1820 BCE) has a possible occupation gap.

The Middle Bronze Age II (c. 1820–1550 BCE) in attested in Area R as Strata R-5–R-3.

=== Late Bronze Age ===
The Late Bronze Age IA (Stratum R-2). The Late Bronze Age IB–IIA (Stratum R-1).

Level X (LB I). Canaanite settlement. Contemporary with early 18th Dynasty of Egypt (Ahmose-Hatshepsut).

==== Egyptian period ====
During the three hundred years of rule by the New Kingdom of Egypt, the population of Beit She'an appears to have been primarily Egyptian administrative officials and military personnel.

Level IX (LB IIA). After the conquest of Beit She'an by Pharaoh Thutmose III in the 15th century BCE, as recorded in an inscription at Karnak, the small town on the summit of the mound became the center of the Egyptian administration of the region. The Egyptian newcomers changed the organization of the town and left a great deal of material culture behind. A large Canaanite temple (39 m (128 ft) in length) excavated by the University of Pennsylvania Museum (Penn Museum) may date from about the same period as Thutmose III's conquest, though the Hebrew University excavations suggest that it dates to a later period. Artifacts of potential cultic significance were found around the temple. Based on an Egyptian stele found at the place, the temple was dedicated to the god Mekal. The Hebrew University excavations determined that this temple was built on the site of an earlier one.

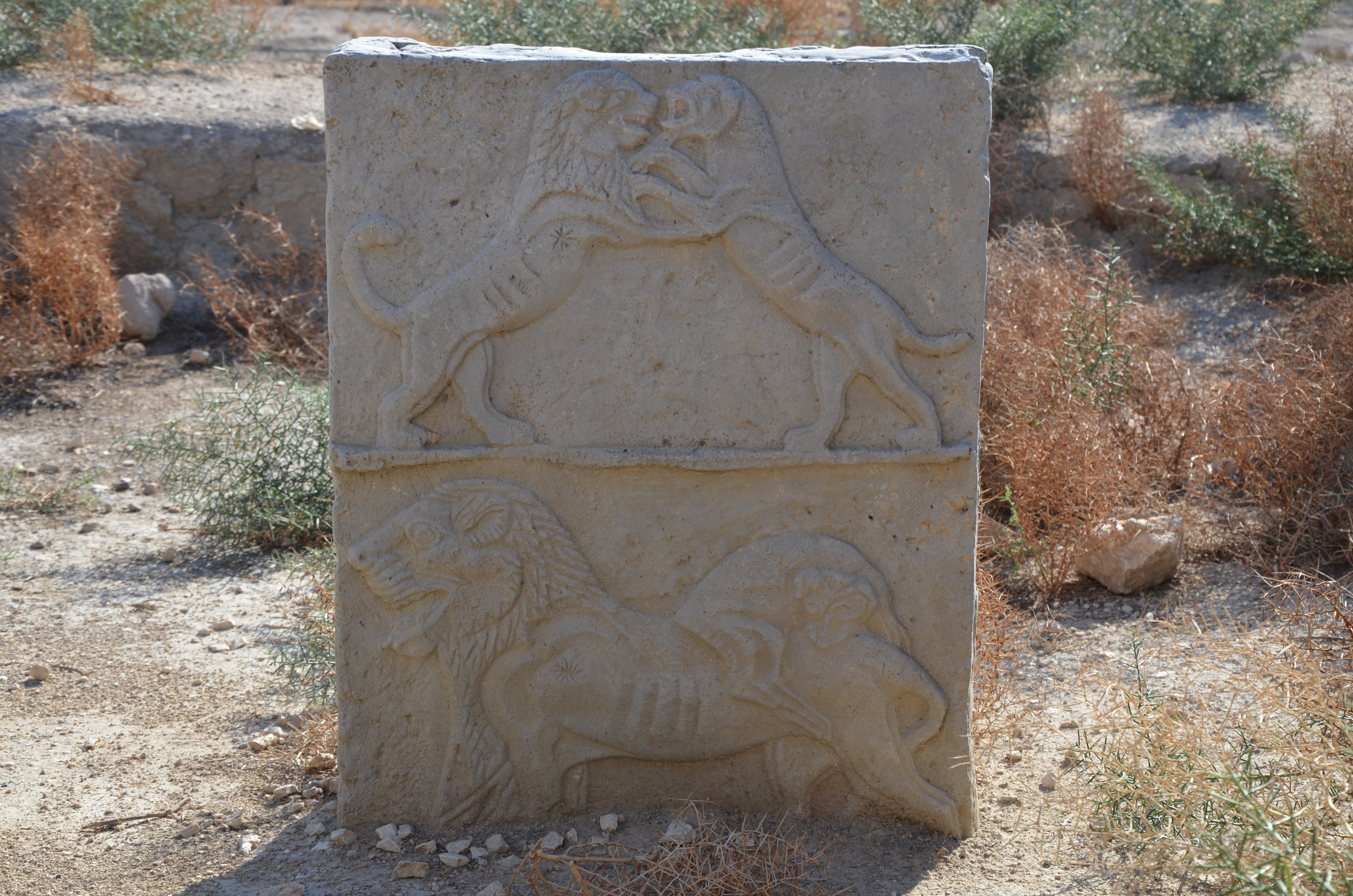
Lion and Lioness, 14th century BC

One of the most important finds near the temple is the Lion and Lioness (or a dog) stela, currently in the Israel Museum in Jerusalem, which depicts the two playing.

Level VIII. Amarna period

Level VII (LB IIB). The town was completely rebuilt, following a new layout, during the 19th dynasty. The Penn Museum excavations uncovered two important stelae from the period of Seti I and a monument of Ramesses II. One of those steles is particularly interesting because it testifies to the presence Habiru, which Seti I protected from an Asiatic tribe. While William F. Albright identified the Habiru as "Hebrews" that identification has been challenged by newer scholarship. Pottery was produced locally, but some was made to mimic Egyptian forms. Other Canaanite goods existed alongside Egyptian imports, or locally made Egyptian-style objects.

During the 20th Dynasty, invasions of the "Sea Peoples" upset Egypt's control over the Eastern Mediterranean. Though the exact circumstances are unclear, the entire site of Beit She'an was destroyed by fire around 1150 BC. The Egyptians did not attempt to rebuild their administrative center and finally lost control of the region. The 20th Dynasty saw the construction of large administrative buildings in Beit She'an, including "Building 1500", a small palace for the Egyptian governor.

Over 50 clay anthropoid coffins were found at the site mainly from the 13th and 12th centuries BC. Most are in the typical Egyptian style but some are of a "grotesque" type linked to the Aegean which caused earlier archaeologists to suggest they were of the "sea peoples" which pharaoh Ramses III claimed to have resettled in the region.

Level VI (LB IIB). Stratum S-4. Egyptian garrison (early 20th Dyn. Ramesses III). Sherds of Mycenaean IIIC pottery.

=== Iron Age ===
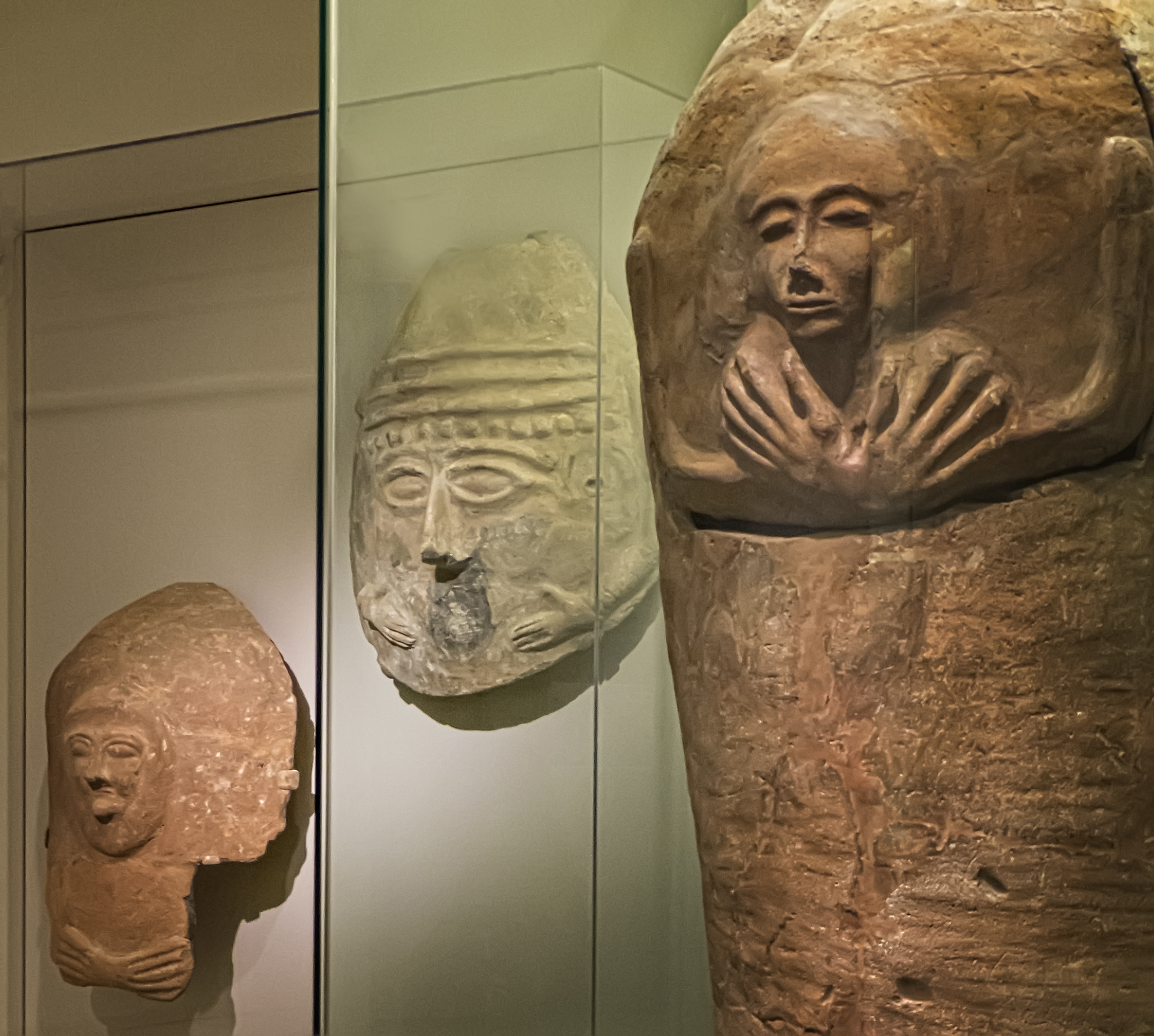
Terracotta sarcophagus Beth Shean northern cemetery tomb 202A Iron IA 1200–1150 BCE, Penn Museum

==== Iron IA ====
- Iron IA (c. 1150-1080 BCE). Stratum S-3. Egyptian garrison (late 20th Dyn. Ramesses IV-VI). Four sherds of Mycenaean IIIC pottery.
- Destruction of the Egyptian garrison

==== Iron IB ====
An Iron Age IB (c. 1080–950, cf. 21st Dynasty of Egypt) Canaanite city was constructed on the site of the Egyptian center shortly after its destruction.

The Hebrew Bible identifies Beit She'an as where the bodies of King Saul and three of his sons were hung by the Philistines after the Battle of Gilboa. The Philistines prevailed and Saul died in battle together with three of his sons, Jonathan, Abinadab and Malchishua, (1 Samuel and 1 Chronicles, 1 Samuel 31; 1 Chronicles 10). 1 Samuel 31:10 states that "the victorious Philistines hung the body of King Saul on the walls of Beit She'an". Later, the people of Jabesh-Gilead took the remnants, carried them into their city, and burned them. No archeological evidence was found of a Philistine occupation of Beit She'an, but it is possible the force only passed there.

1 Kings 4:12 refers to Beit She'an as part of the kingdom of Solomon, though the historical accuracy of this list is debated. Archaeomagnetic dates suggest that the first Israelite urban settlement was established either during the Solomonic period or in the pre-Omride phase of the early kingdom of Israel at the latest, and that it was probably destroyed around 935–900 BC.

==== Iron II ====
Level V (Iron IIA). Stratum S1.

Level IV (Iron IIB). Fortified city in the Northern Kingdom of Samaria/Israel.

===== Assyrian period =====
In 732 BCE, the Assyrian conquest of the northern kingdom of Israel under Tiglath-Pileser III brought about the destruction of Beit She'an by fire. (see also Megiddo).

Minimal reoccupation occurred until the Hellenistic period.

=== Classical Age ===
==== Hellenistic period ====
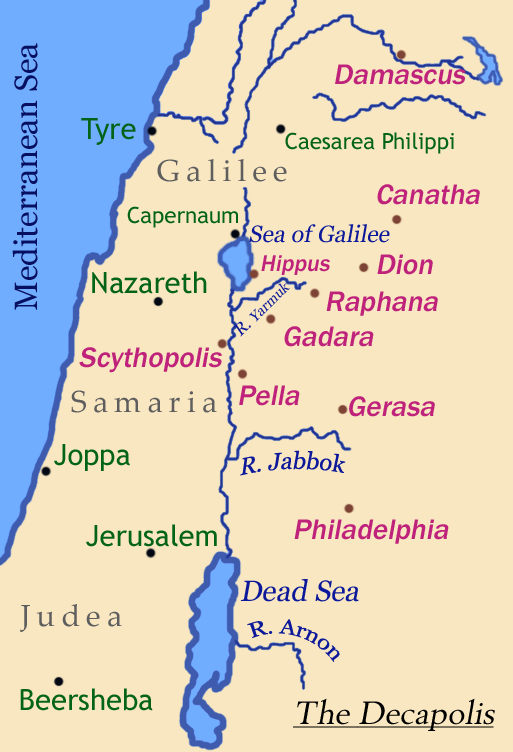
Map of the Decapolis showing the location of Beit She'an, here called by its Greek name, Scythopolis

The Hellenistic period saw the reoccupation of the site of Beit She'an under the new name "Scythopolis" (Ancient Greek: Σκυθόπολις), meaning "City of the Scythians", possibly named after the Scythian mercenaries who settled there as veterans.

Little is known about the Hellenistic city, but during the 3rd century BCE a large temple was constructed on the tell. It is unknown which deity was worshipped there, but the temple continued to be used during Roman times. Graves dating from the Hellenistic period are simple, singular rock-cut tombs. From 301 to 198 BCE the area was under the control of the Ptolemies, and Beit She'an is mentioned in 3rd–2nd century BCE written sources describing the Syrian Wars between the Ptolemaic and Seleucid dynasties. In 198 BCE the Seleucids finally conquered the region.

==== Roman period ====
In 63 BCE, Pompey made Judea a part of the Roman Republic. Beit She'an was refounded and rebuilt by Gabinius. The town center shifted from the summit of the mound, or tell, to its slopes. Scythopolis prospered and became the leading city of the Decapolis, the only one west of the Jordan River.

The city flourished under the "Pax Romana", as evidenced by high-level urban planning and extensive construction, including the best preserved Roman theatre of ancient Samaria, as well as a hippodrome, a cardo and other trademarks of the Roman influence. Mount Gilboa, 7 km (4 mi) away, provided dark basalt blocks, as well as water (via an aqueduct) to the town. Beit She'an is said to have sided with the Romans during the early phase of the First Jewish–Roman War in 66 CE. Excavations have focused less on the Roman period ruins, so not much is known about this period. The Penn. University Museum excavation of the northern cemetery, however, did uncover significant finds. The Roman period tombs are of the loculus type: a rectangular rock-cut spacious chamber with smaller chambers (loculi) cut into its side. Bodies were placed directly in the loculi, or inside sarcophagi which were placed in the loculi. A sarcophagus with an inscription identifying its occupant in Greek as "Antiochus, the son of Phallion", may have held the cousin of Herod the Great. One of the most interesting Roman grave finds was a bronze incense shovel with the handle in the form of an animal leg, or hoof, now in the University of Pennsylvania Museum.

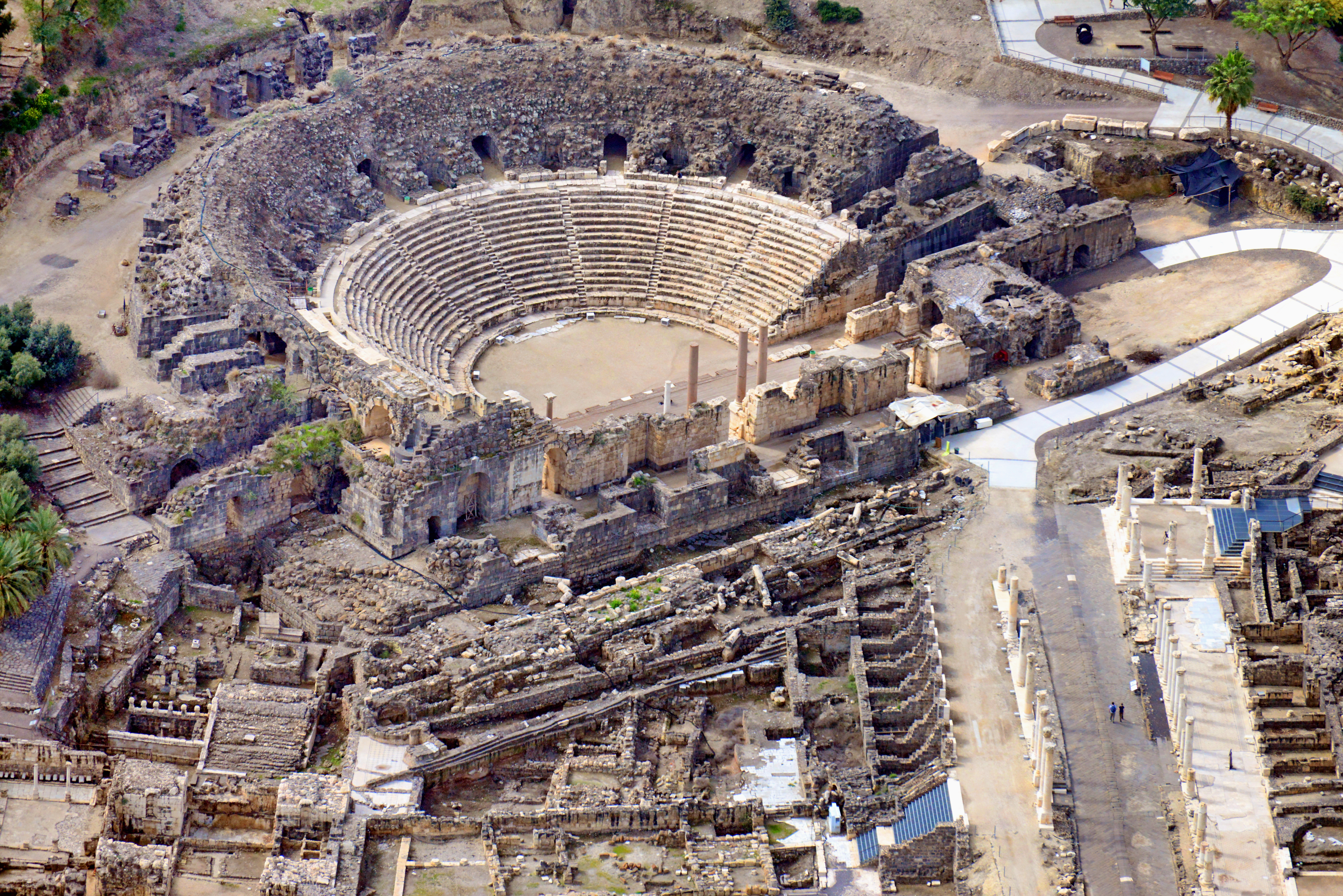
The Roman theatre

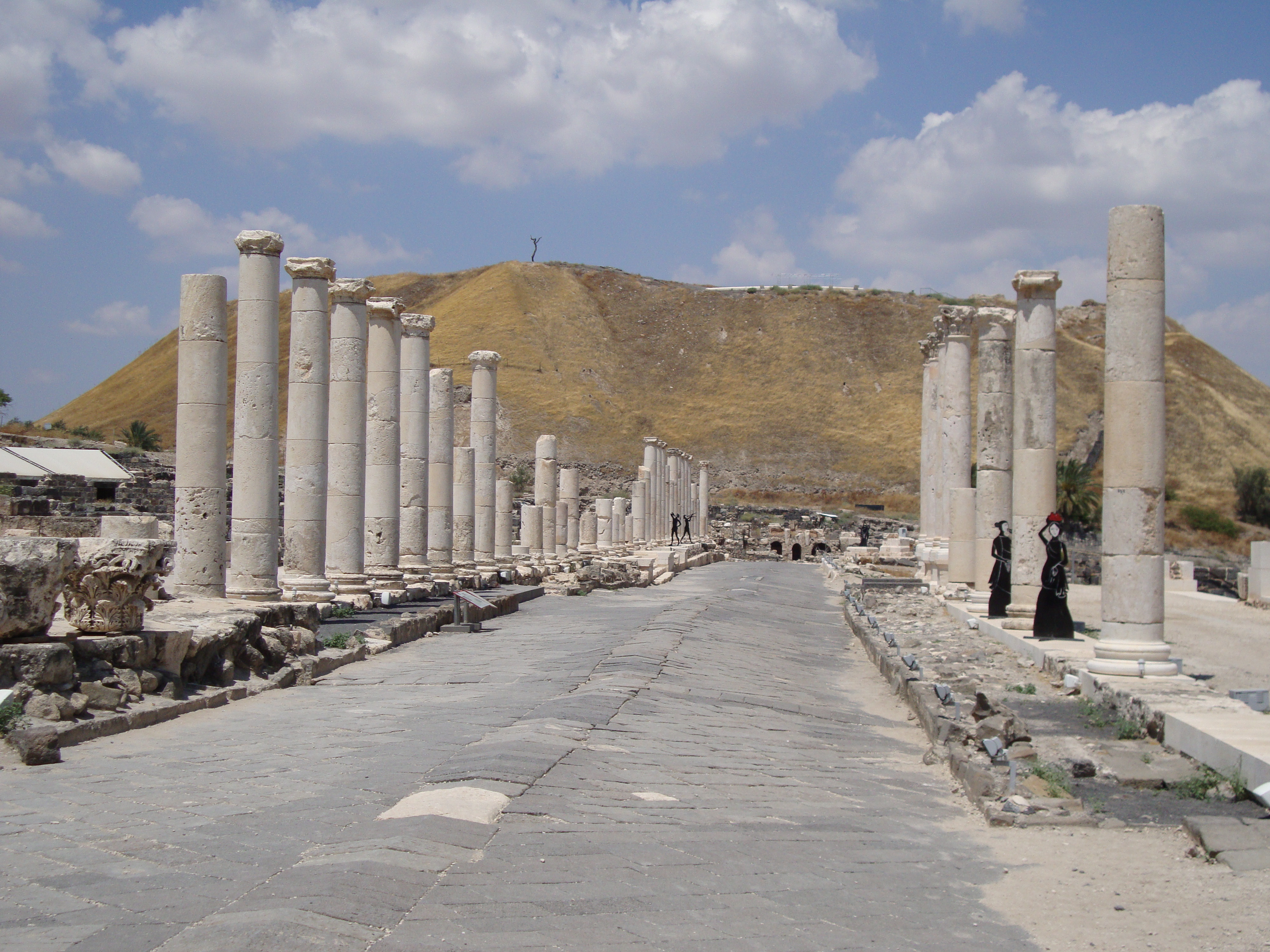
Roman cardo

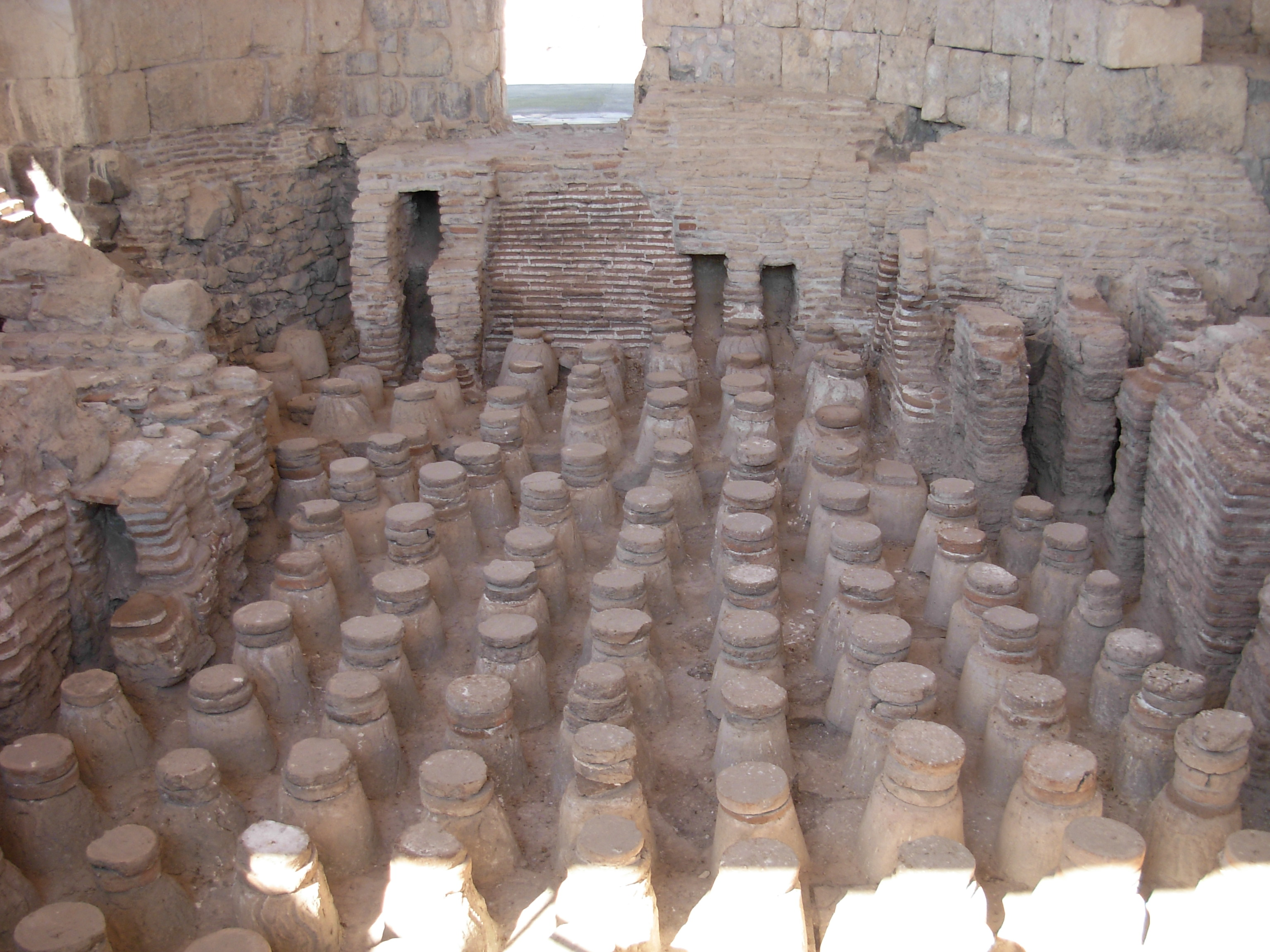
Roman baths

=== Middle Ages ===
==== Byzantine period ====
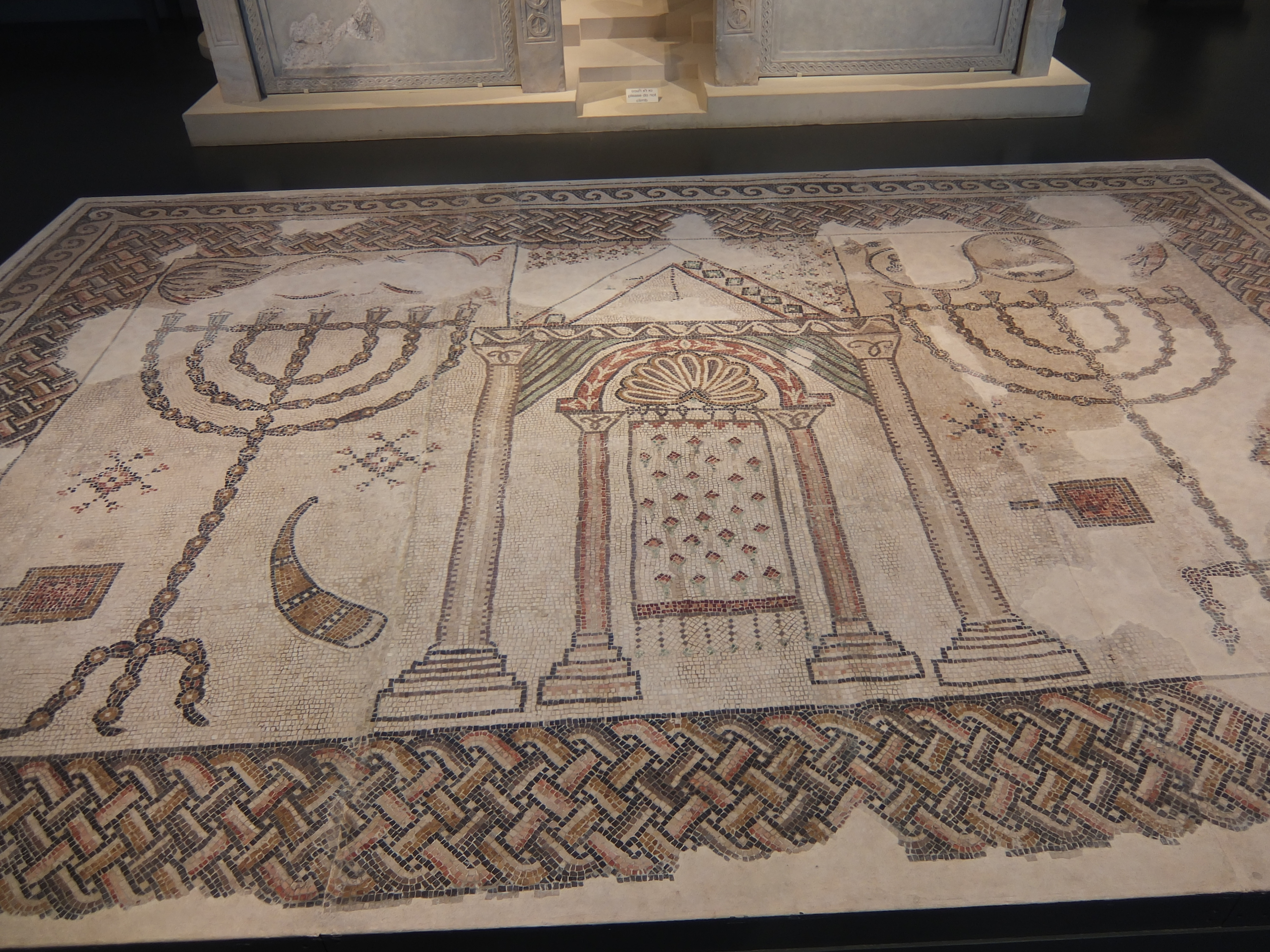
Mosaic from 5th–7th century synagogue in northern Beit Shean, possibly Samaritan, Israel Museum

Copious archaeological remains were found dating to the Byzantine period (324 – 636) and were excavated by the Penn Museum from 1921 to 1923. A rotunda church was constructed on top of the tell, and a wall enclosed the entire city. Textual sources mention several other churches in the town. Scythopolis was primarily Christian, as attested to by many churches, but evidence of Jewish habitation and a Samaritan synagogue indicate established communities of these minorities. The pagan temples in the city center went out of use, but the nymphaeum and the thermae were restored, and a Sigma-shaped complex was added. Many of the buildings of Scythopolis were damaged in the 363 Galilee earthquake. In 409, Syria Palaestina was divided and Scythopolis became the capital of the northern region of Palaestina Secunda. and the See of Scythopolis was the Metropolitan archdiocese.

Dedicatory inscriptions indicate a preference for donations to religious buildings. Many colourful mosaics were preserved, such as that featuring the zodiac in the Lady Mary's Monastery, or the one with a temple menorah and the phrase shalom in the House of Leontius synagogue. The Samaritan synagogue's mosaic was unique in its aniconic abstention from human or animal images, instead using floral and geometrical motifs. Elaborate decorations were also found in the settlement's many luxurious villas, and in the 6th century especially, the city reached its maximum size of 40,000 and spread beyond its period city walls.

The Byzantine-era portion of the northern cemetery was excavated in 1926. The tombs from this period consisted of small rock-cut halls with vaulted graves on three sides. A great variety of objects were found in the tombs, including terracotta figurines possibly depicting the Virgin and Child, many terracotta lamps, glass mirrors, bells, tools, knives, finger rings, iron keys, glass beads, bone hairpins, and many other items.

Influential Christian personalities who lived or passed through Scythopolis are Procopius of Scythopolis (died July 7, 303), Cyril of Scythopolis (ca. 525–559), Epiphanius of Salamis (c. 310/320–403) and Joseph of Tiberias (c. 285 – c. 356) who met there around the year 355.

==== Early Muslim period ====
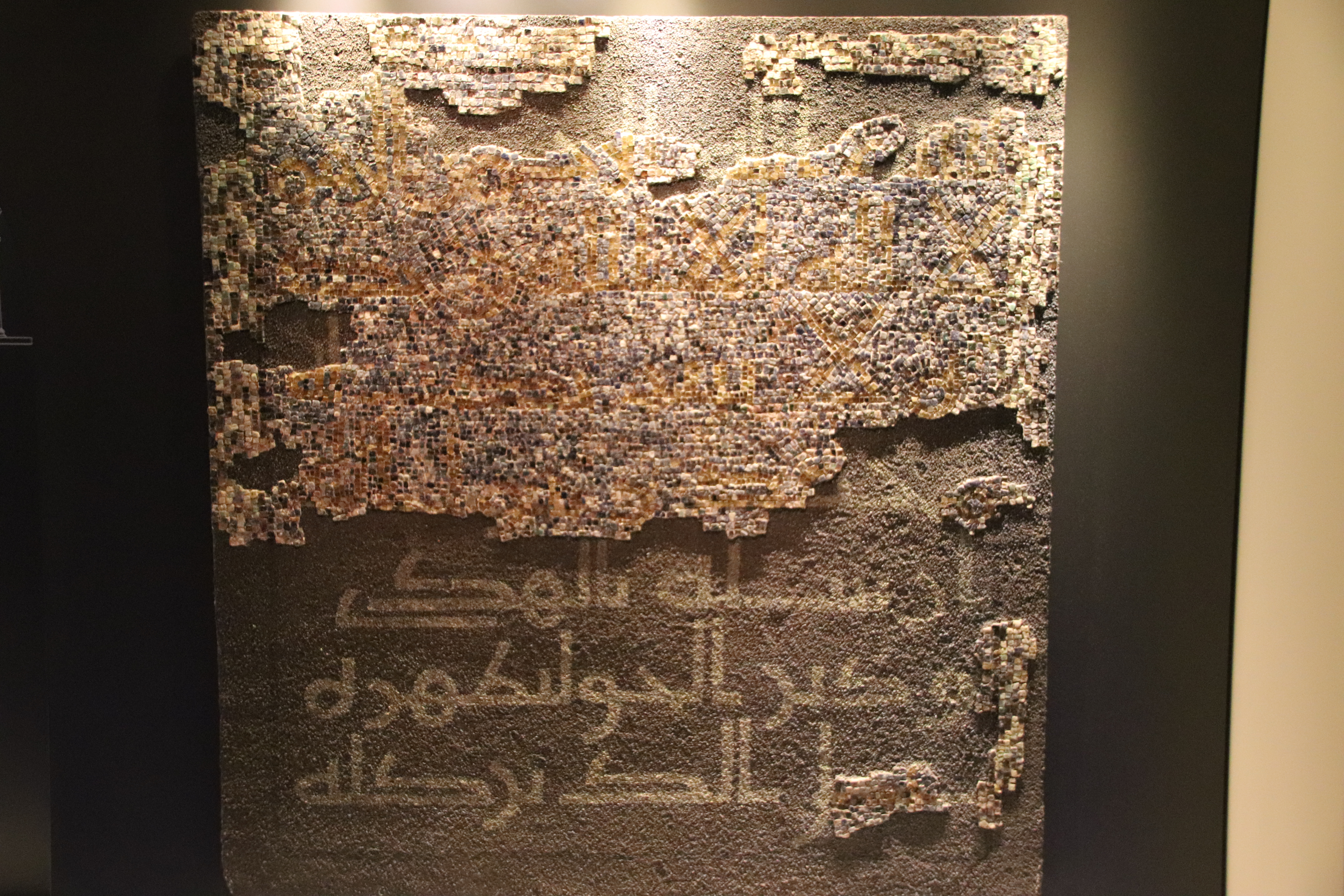
Arabic inscription in stone and gold-glass mosaic dated to 738 from the Bazaar Gate of then Bisan, now displayed in the Israel Museum

In 634, Byzantine forces were defeated by the Rashidun army under the Rashid caliph Umar, and the city reverted to its Semitic name, being named Baysan (Bisan) in Arabic. The day of victory came to be known in Arabic as Yawm Baysan "day of Baysan." The city was not damaged; newly arrived Muslims lived alongside the Christian population until the 8th century. The town formed one of the districts of Jund al-Urdunn, itself a part of the Bilad al-Sham, until the Crusades.

The city declined; structures were built in the streets, narrowing them to mere alleys, and makeshift shops were opened among the colonnades. The city reached a low point in the 8th century, witnessed by the removal of marble for producing lime, the blocking off of the main street, and the conversion of a main plaza into a cemetery.

However, some recently discovered counter-evidence may be offered to this picture of decline. In common with state-directed building work carried out in other towns and cities in the region during the 720s, Baysan's commercial infrastructure was refurbished: its main colonnaded market street, once thought to date to the sixth century, is now known—based on a mosaic inscription—to be a redesign dating from the time of the Umayyad caliph Hisham ibn Abd al-Malik (r. 724–43). Al-Bakri of al-Andalus noted that the wine produced there was delicious.

On January 18, 749, Umayyad Baysan was devastated by a catastrophic earthquake. A few residential neighborhoods grew among the ruins, probably established by the survivors, but the city never recovered its magnificence. The city center moved to the southern hill, where the Crusaders later built a castle.

Jerusalemite historian al-Muqaddasi visited Baysan in 985, during the Abbasid Caliphate and wrote that it was "on the river, with plentiful palm trees, and water, though somewhat heavy (brackish.)" He further noted that Baysan was notable for its indigo, rice, dates, and grape syrup known as dibs. Its principal mosque was situated in the center of its marketplace.

==== Crusader period ====
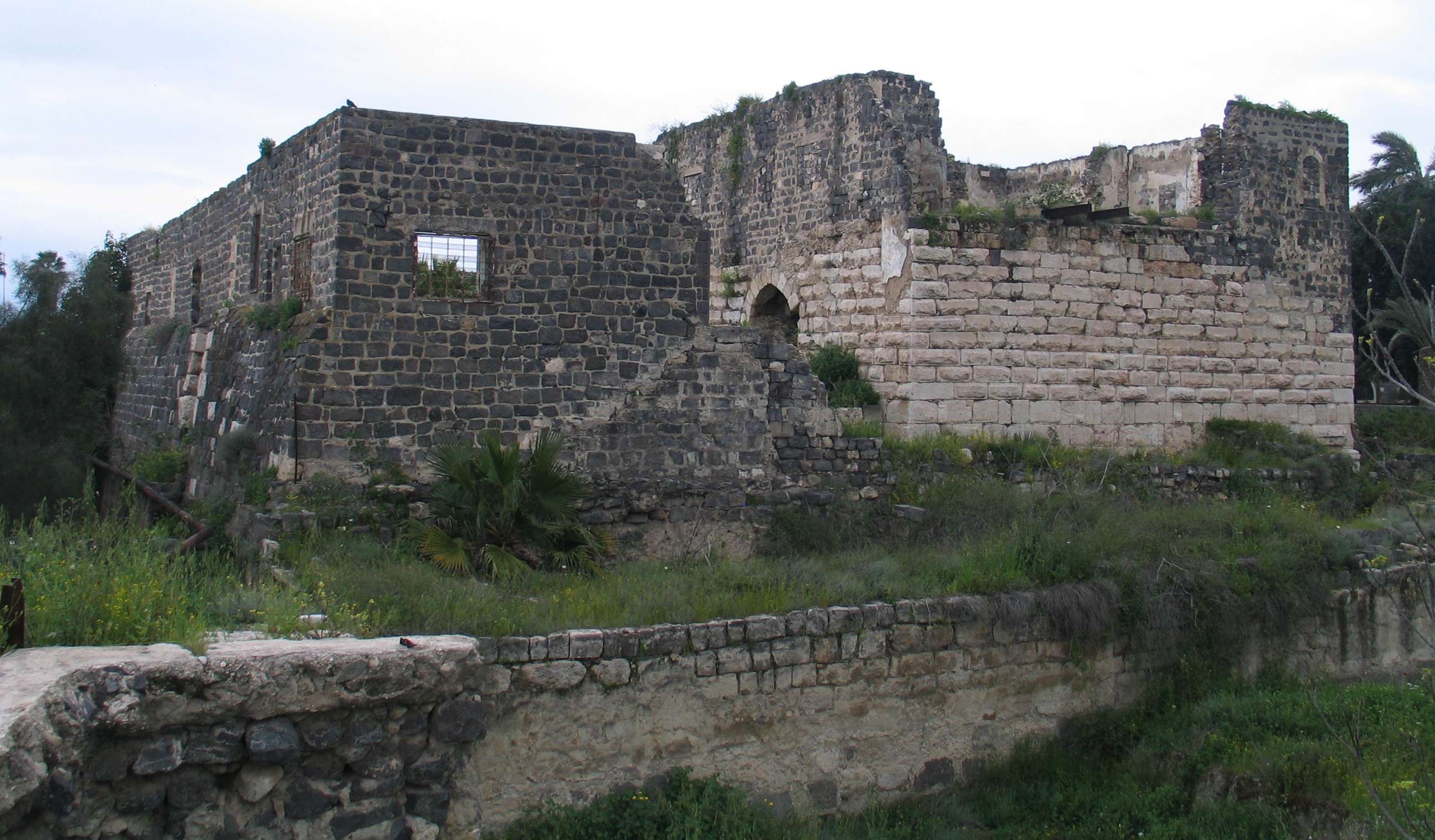
Crusader castle with moat and inner tower.

In the Crusader period, the Lordship of Bessan was occupied by Tancred, Prince of Galilee in 1099; it was never part of the Principality of Galilee, despite its location, but became a royal domain of the Kingdom of Jerusalem in 1101, probably until around 1120. According to the Lignages d'Outremer, the first Crusader lord of Bessan once it became part of the Kingdom of Jerusalem was Adam, a younger son of Robert III de Béthune, peer of Flanders and head of the House of Béthune. His descendants were known by the family name de Bessan.

It occasionally passed back under royal control until new lords were created. The town became part of the Belvoir fiefdom.

A small Crusader fortress surrounded by a moat was built in the area southeast of the Roman theatre, where the diminished town had relocated after the 749 earthquake. The fortress was destroyed by Saladin in 1183.

During the 1260 Battle of Ain Jalut, retreating Mongol forces passed near the town, but did not enter it.

=== Modern Ages ===
==== Mamluk period ====
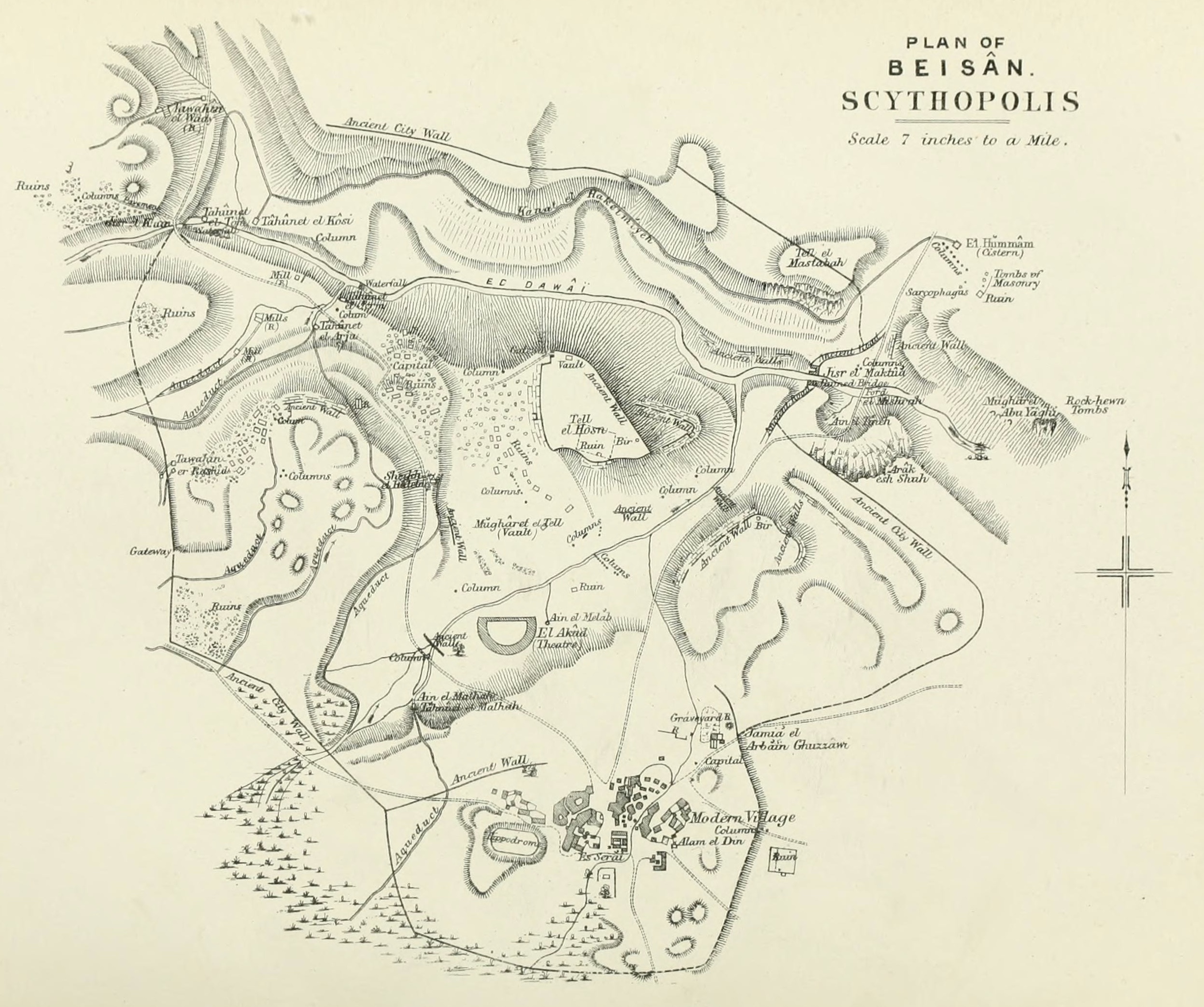
Plan of Beisan-Scythopolis from the 1871–1877 PEF Survey of Palestine

Under Mamluk rule, Beit She'an was the principal town in the district of Damascus and a relay station for the postal service between Damascus and Cairo. It was also the capital of sugar cane processing for the region. Jisr al-Maqtu'a, "the truncated/cut-off bridge", a bridge consisting of a single arch spanning 25 ft (7.6 m) and hung 50 ft (15 m) above a stream, was built during that period.

==== Ottoman period ====
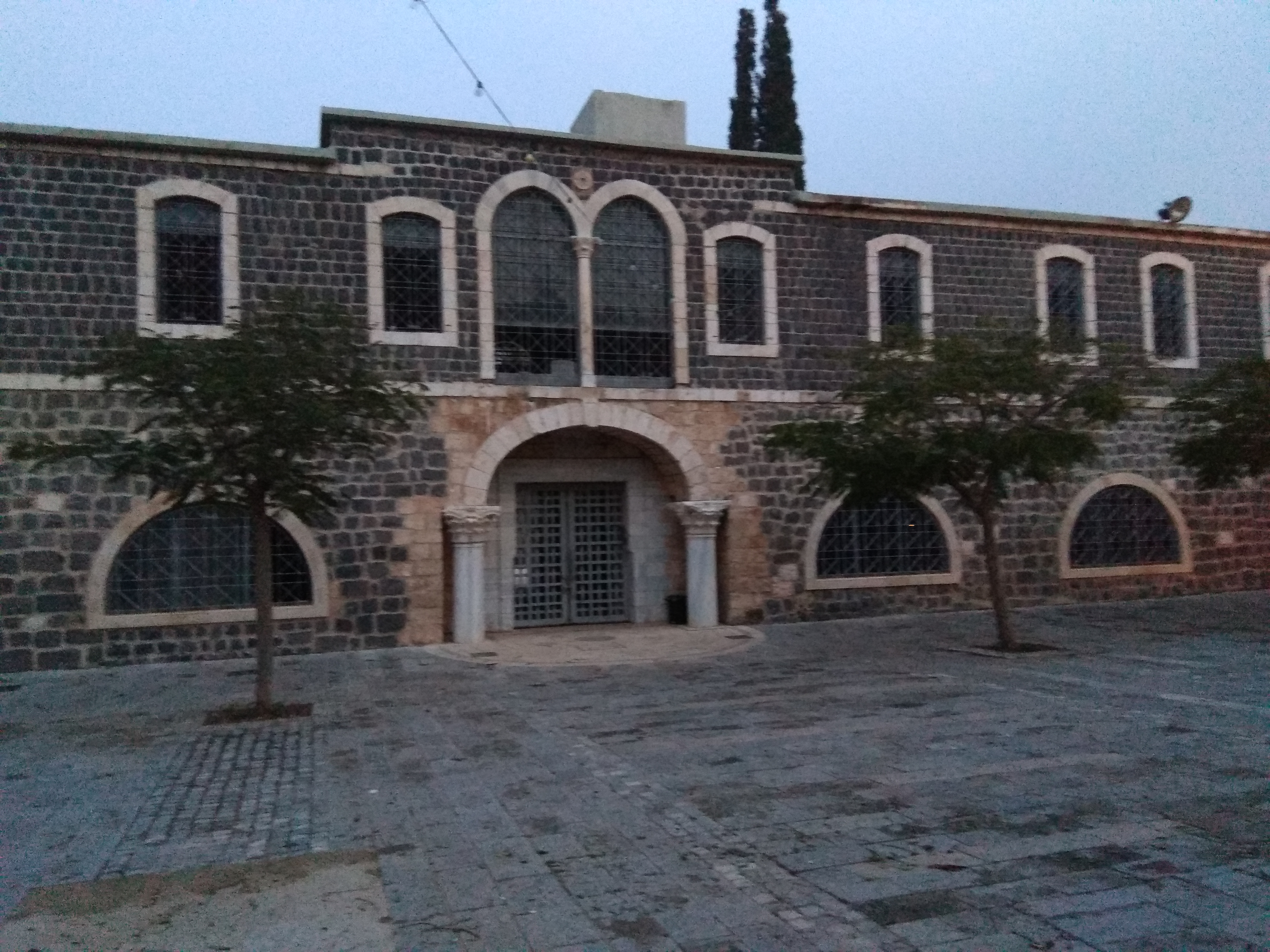
Ottoman Saraya

During this period, the inhabitants of Baysan were mainly Muslim, but there were some Jews. The 14th century topographer Ishtori Haparchi settled there and completed his work "Bulb and Flower" (Hebrew: כפתור ופרח, romanized: Kaftor vaFeraḥ) in 1322, the first Hebrew book on the geography of the Land of Israel.

During the 400 years of Ottoman rule, Baysan lost its regional importance. During the reign of Sultan Abdul Hamid II when the Jezreel Valley railway, which was part of the Haifa to Damascus extension of the Hejaz railway was constructed, a limited revival took place. The local peasant population was largely impoverished by the Ottoman feudal land system, which leased tracts of land to tenants and collected taxes from them for their use.

The Swiss–German traveler Johann Ludwig Burckhardt described Beisan in 1812: "The present village of Bysan contains seventy or eighty houses; its inhabitants are in a miserable condition, from being exposed to the depredations of the Bedouins of the Ghor, to whom they also pay a heavy tribute."

In 1870/1871, an Ottoman census listed the village in the nahiya (sub-district) of Shafa al-Shamali.

In the early 20th century, though still a tiny and obscure village, Beisan was known for its plentiful water supply, fertile soil, and producing olives, grapes, figs, almonds, apricots, and apples.

==== British Mandate period ====
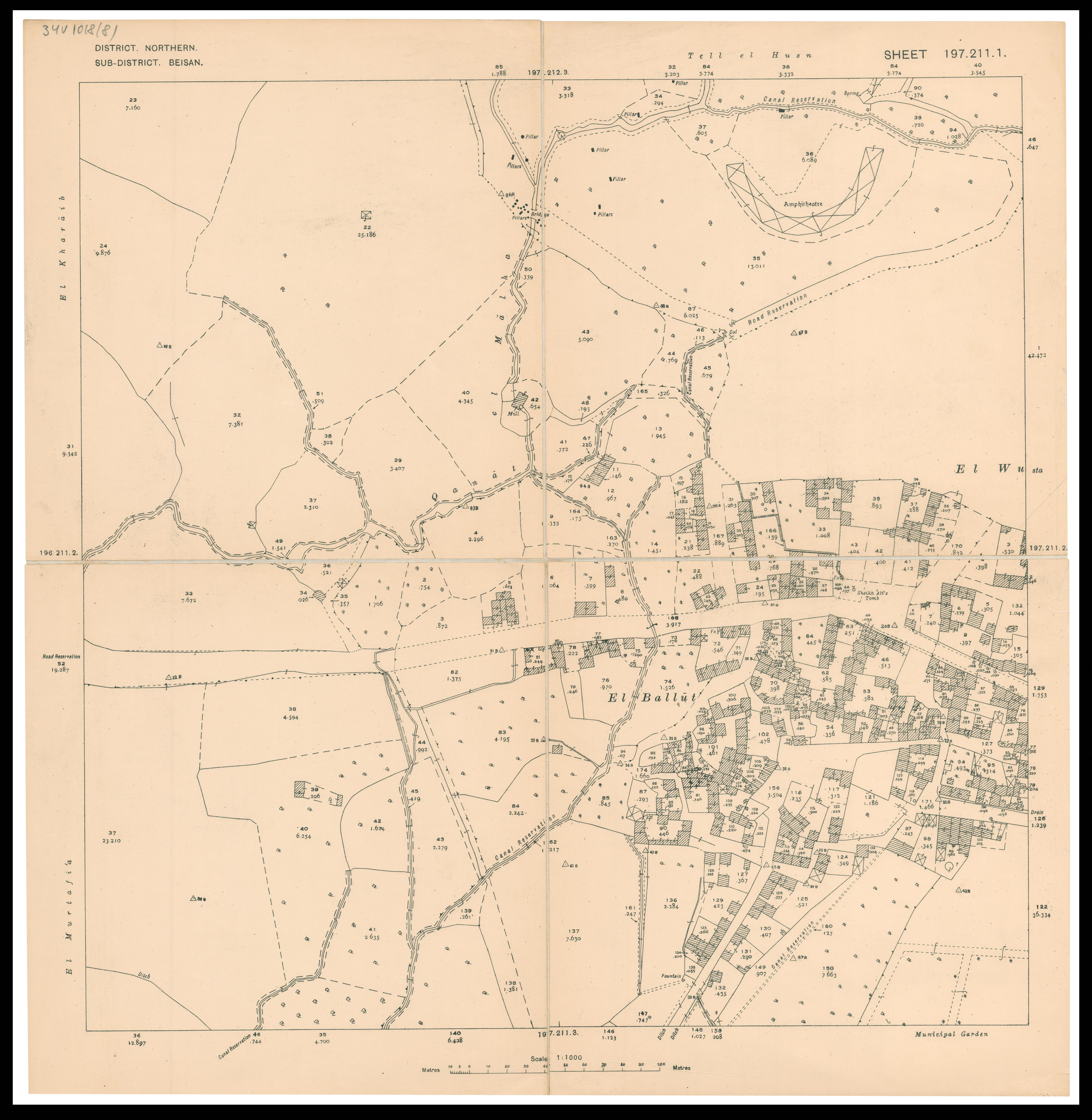
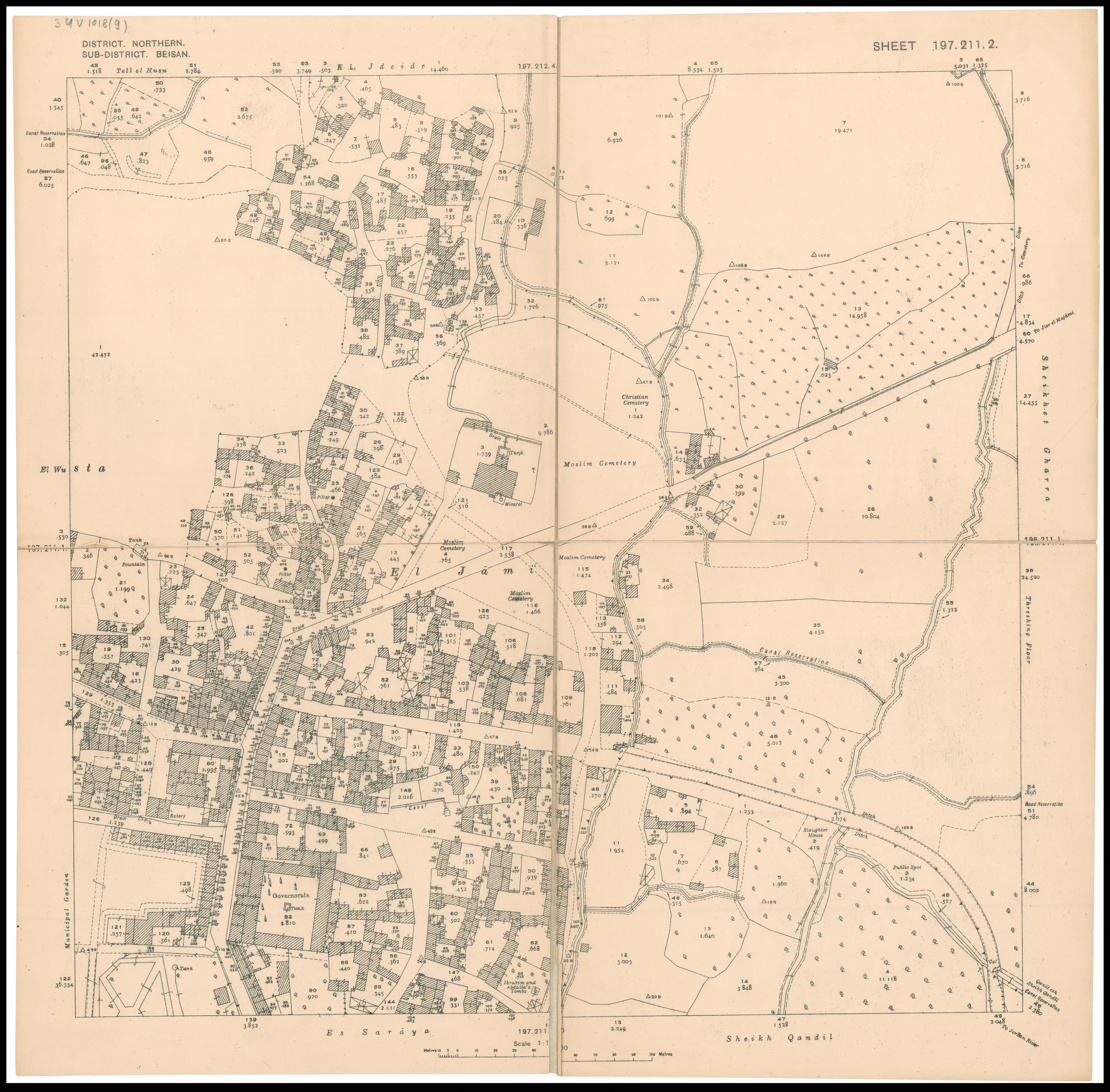
Detailed map of the town in the 1930s from the Survey of Palestine

Under the Mandate, the city was the center of the District of Baysan. According to a census conducted in 1922 by the British Mandate authorities, Beit She'an (Baisan) had a population of 1,941, consisting of 1,687 Muslims, 41 Jews and 213 Christians.

In 1934, Lawrence of Arabia noted that "Bisan is now a purely Arab village," where "very fine views of the river can be had from the housetops." He further noted that "many nomad and Bedouin encampments, distinguished by their black tents, were scattered about the riverine plain, their flocks and herds grazing round them." Beisan was home to a mainly Mizrahi Jewish community of 95 until 1936, when the 1936–1939 Arab revolt saw Beisan serve as a center of Arab attacks on Jews in Palestine. In 1938, after learning of the murder of his close friend and Jewish leader Haim Sturmann, Orde Wingate led his men on an offensive in the Arab section of Baysan, the rebels’ suspected base.

According to population surveys conducted in British Mandate Palestine, Beisan consisted of 5,080 Muslim Arabs out of a population of 5,540 (92% of the population), with the remainder being listed as Christians. In 1945, the surrounding District of Baysan consisted of 16,660 Muslims (67%), 7,590 Jews (30%), and 680 Christians (3%); and Arabs owned 44% of land, Jews owned 34%, and 22% constituted public lands. The 1947 UN Partition Plan allocated Beisan and most of its district to the proposed Jewish state.

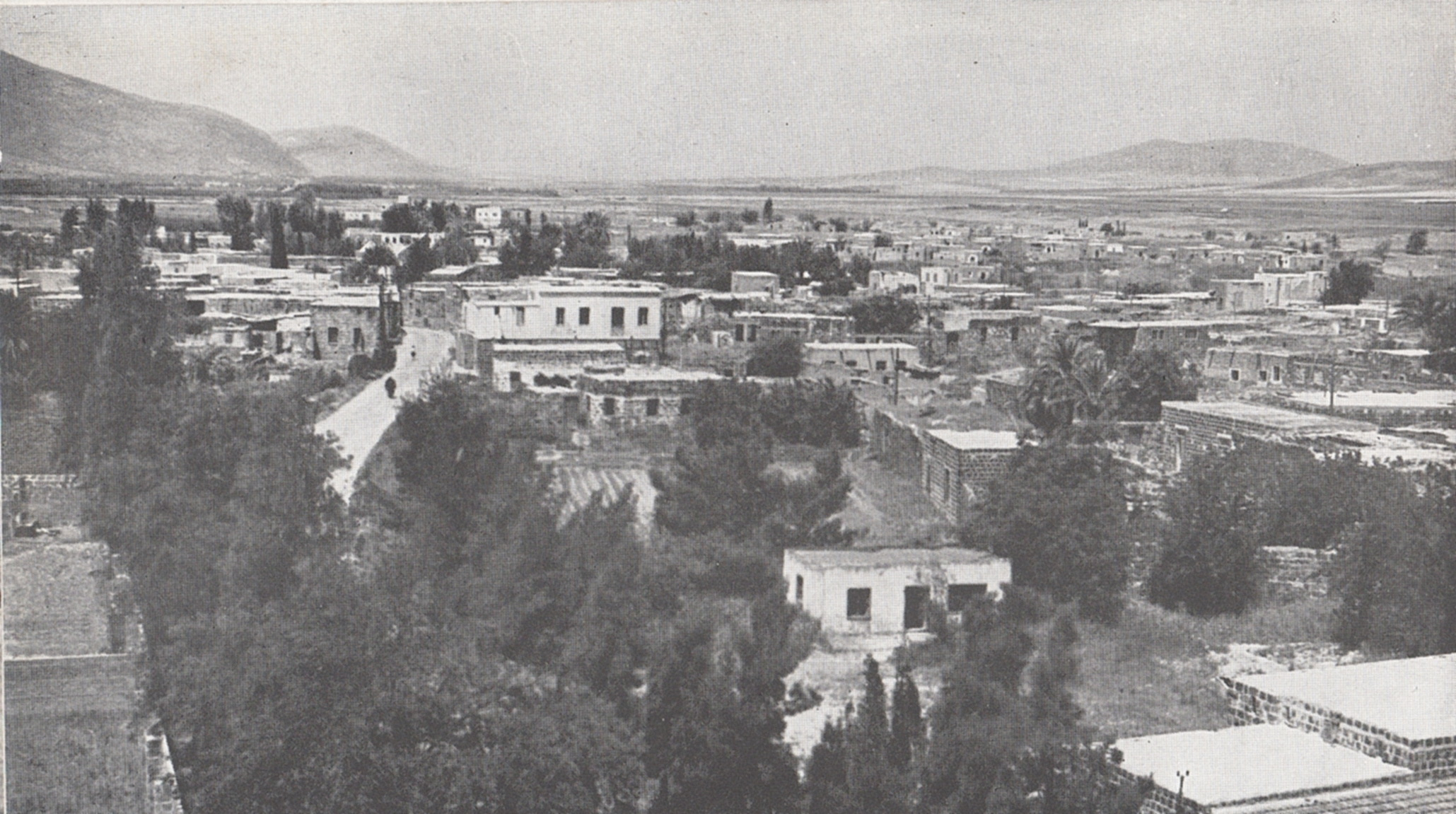
Beisan in 1936

Beit She’an 1939

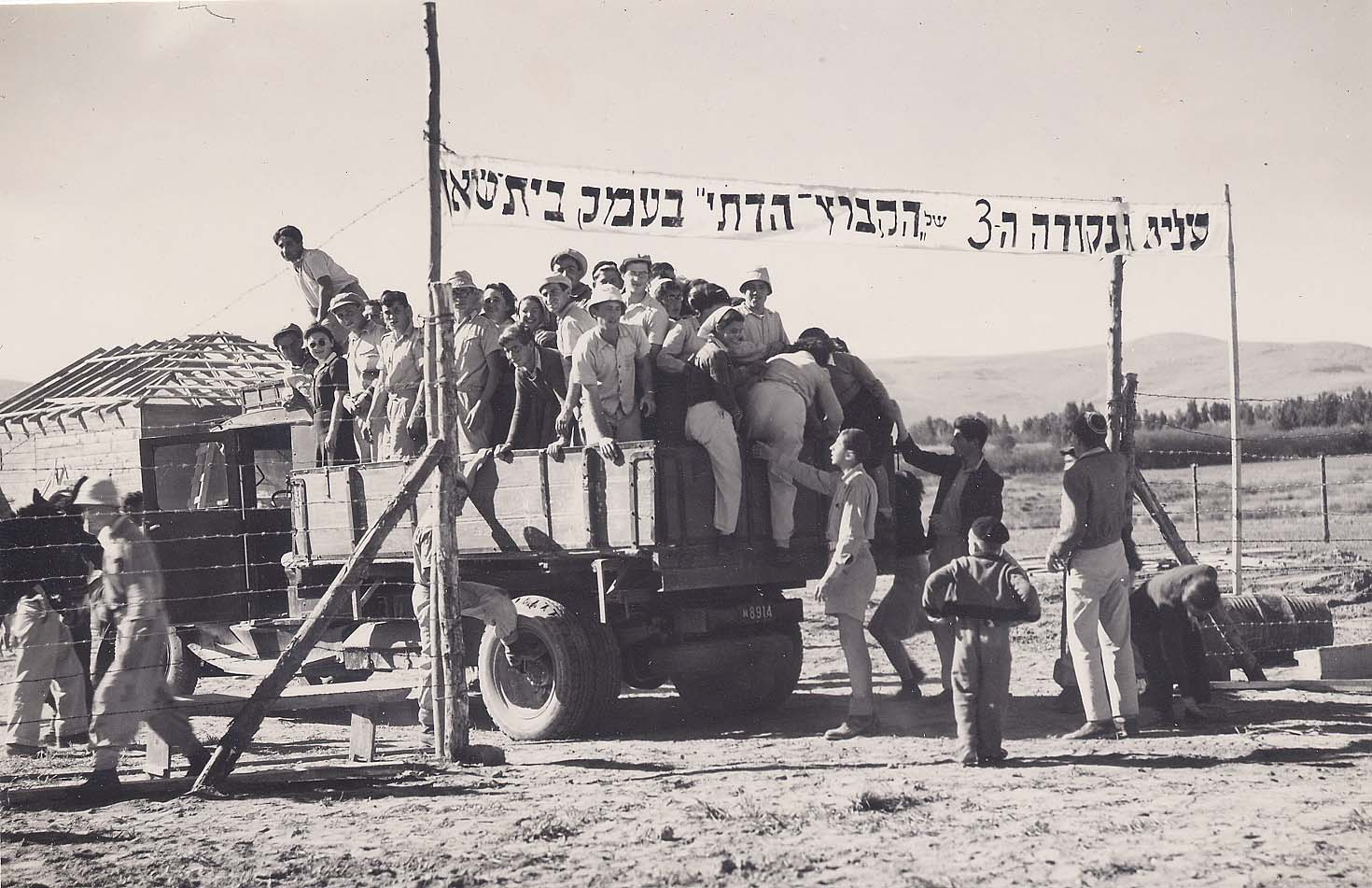
Pioneers of Kibbutz Ein Hanatziv settle in Bet She'an, 1946

==== 1948 Palestine war ====
Jewish forces and local Bedouins first clashed during the 1947–1948 civil war in Mandatory Palestine in February and March 1948, part of Operation Gideon, itself part of Plan Dalet. Joseph Weitz, a leading Yishuv figure, wrote in his diary on May 4, 1948, that, "The Beit Shean Valley is the gate for our state in the Galilee...[I]ts clearing is the need of the hour."

Beisan, then an Arab village, fell to the Jewish militias three days before the end of the Mandate. After Israel's Declaration of Independence in May 1948, during intense shelling by Syrian border units, followed by the recapture of the valley by the Haganah, the Arab inhabitants fled across the Jordan River. The property and buildings abandoned after the conflict were then held by the State of Israel. Most Arab Christians relocated to Nazareth.

Historian Saleh Abdel Jawad writes that Beisan experienced "aerial bombardment, entirely without military justification and as a tool of expulsion".

==== State of Israel ====
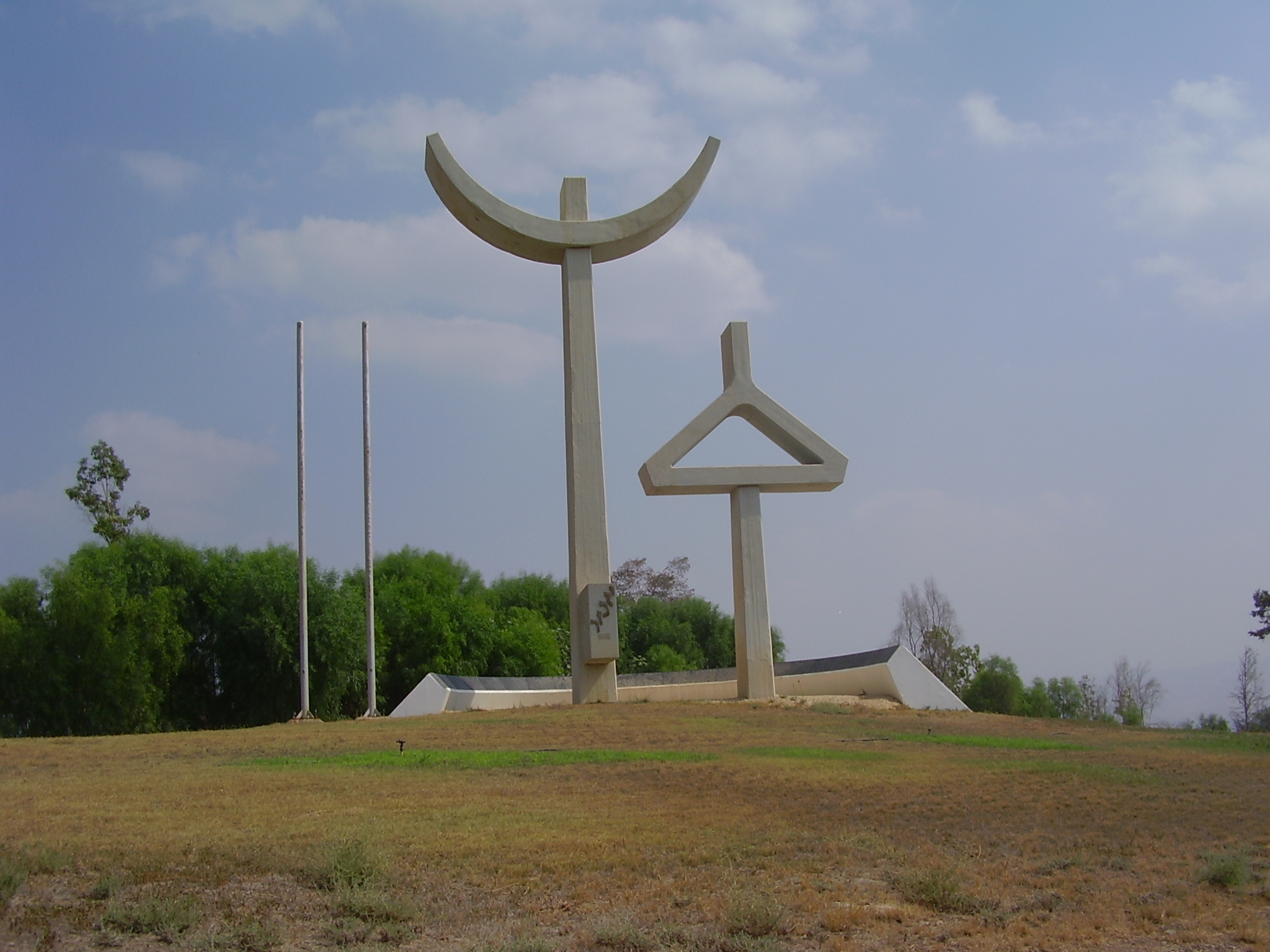
War monument, Al Mansfeld and Munio Weinraub, 1960

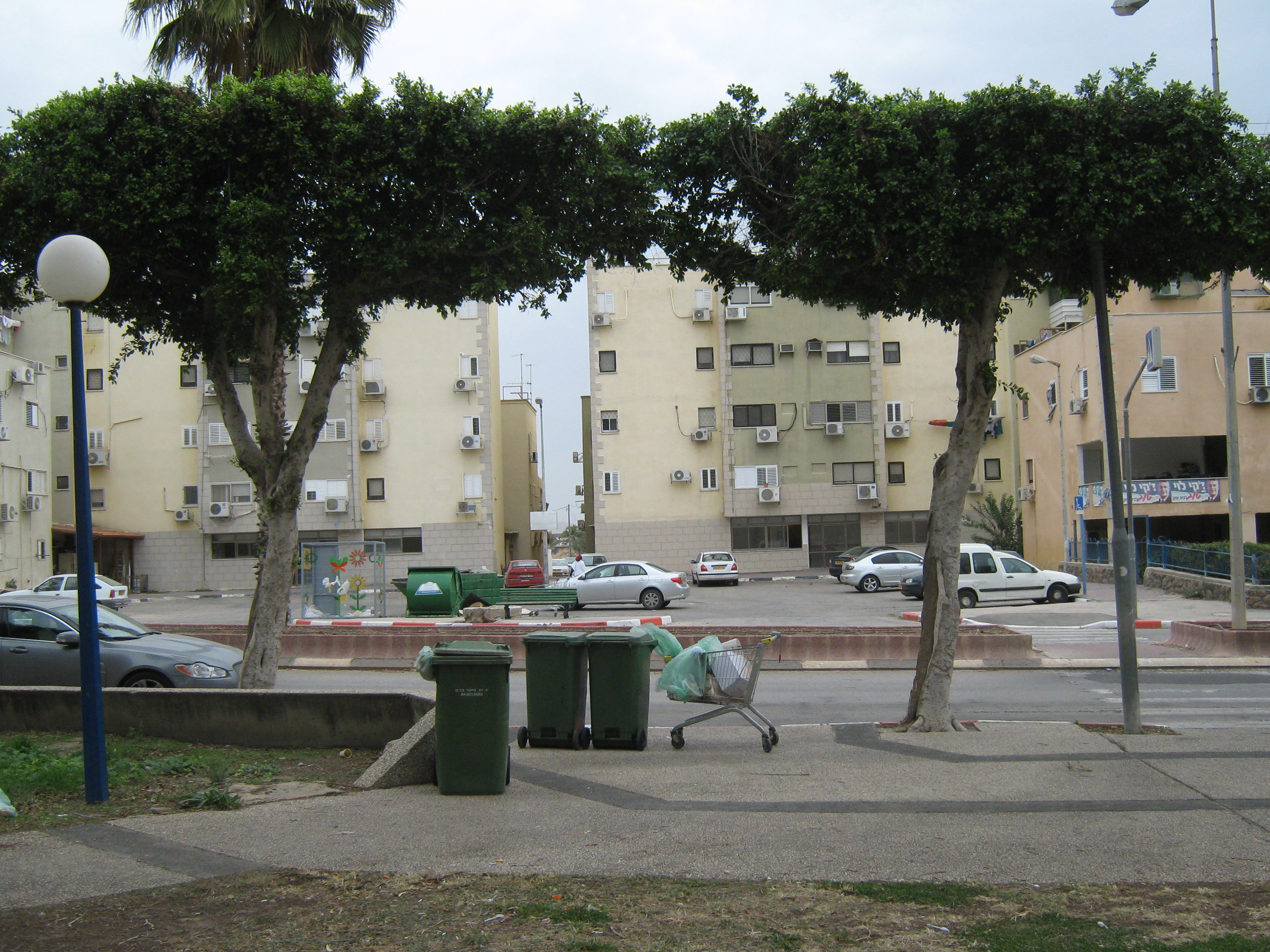
A neighborhood in Beit She'an

A ma'abarah (immigration camp) inhabited mainly by North African Jewish olim (immigrants) was erected in Beit She'an, and it later became a development town.

From 1969, Beit She'an was a target for Katyusha rockets and mortar attacks from Jordan. In the 1974 Beit She'an attack, militants of the Popular Democratic Front for the Liberation of Palestine, took over an apartment building and murdered a family of four.

In 1999, Beit She'an was incorporated as a city. Geographically, it lies in the middle of the Emek HaMaayanot Regional Council, formerly the Beit She'an Valley Regional Council.

Since June 2000, Beit She'an has been included in the "Tentative List of World Heritage Places" of the UNESCO.

During the Second Intifada, in the 2002 Beit She'an attack, six Israelis were killed and over 30 were injured by two Palestinian militants, who opened fire and threw grenades at a polling station in the center of Bet She'an where party members were voting in the Likud primary.

== Seismicity ==
Beit She'an is located above the Dead Sea Transform (a fault system that forms the transform boundary between the African Plate to the west and the Arabian Plate to the east) and is one of the cities in Israel most at risk to earthquakes (along with Kiryat Shmona, Safed, Tiberias, and Eilat). Historically, the city was destroyed in the Golan earthquake of 749.

== Demographics ==
Historical population
Year	Pop.	±%
1972	11,300	—
1983	13,100	+15.9%
1995	14,600	+11.5%
2008	16,900	+15.8%
2022	19,825	+17.3%
2024	20,253	+2.2%

According to the Israel Central Bureau of Statistics (CBS), the population of the municipality was 20,252 at the end of 2024. In 2005, the ethnic makeup of the city was 99.5% Jewish and other non-Arab (97.3% Jewish), with no significant Arab population. See Population groups in Israel. The population breakdown by gender was 8,200 males and 8,100 females.

The age distribution was as follows:

Age	0–4	5–9	10–14	15–19	20–29	30–44	45–59	60–64	65–74	75+
Percentage	9.9	9.4	9.4	9.4	17.6	17.7	16.7	2.7	4.4	2.8
Source: Israel Central Bureau of Statistics

== Economy ==
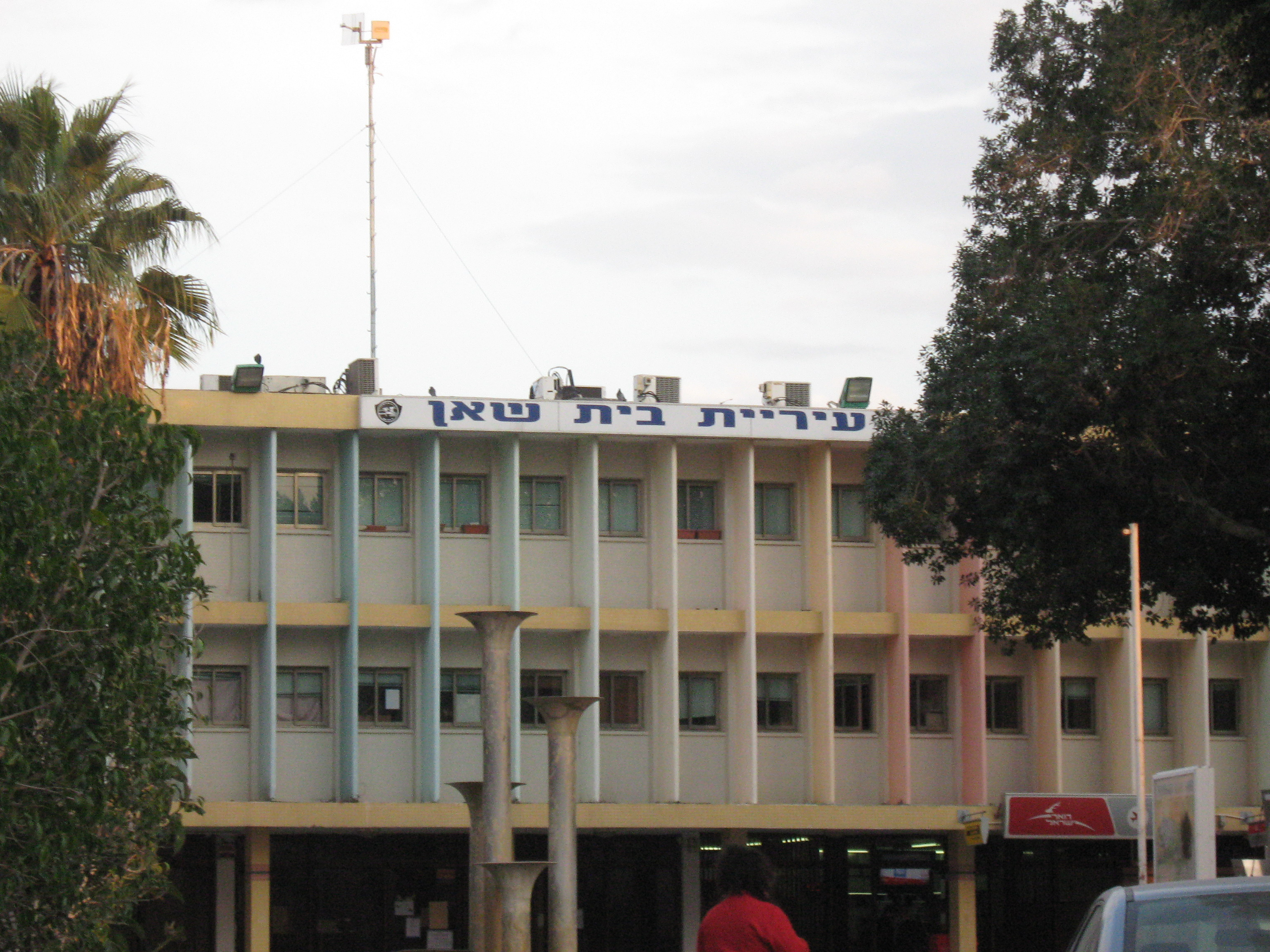
Beit She'an municipality

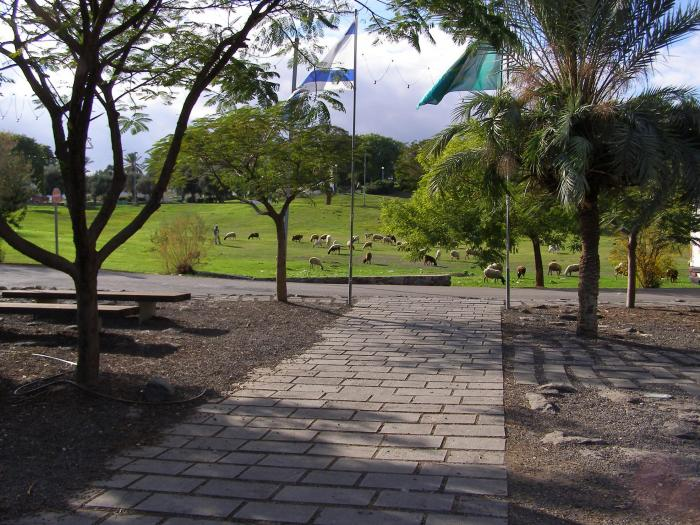
Beit She'an park

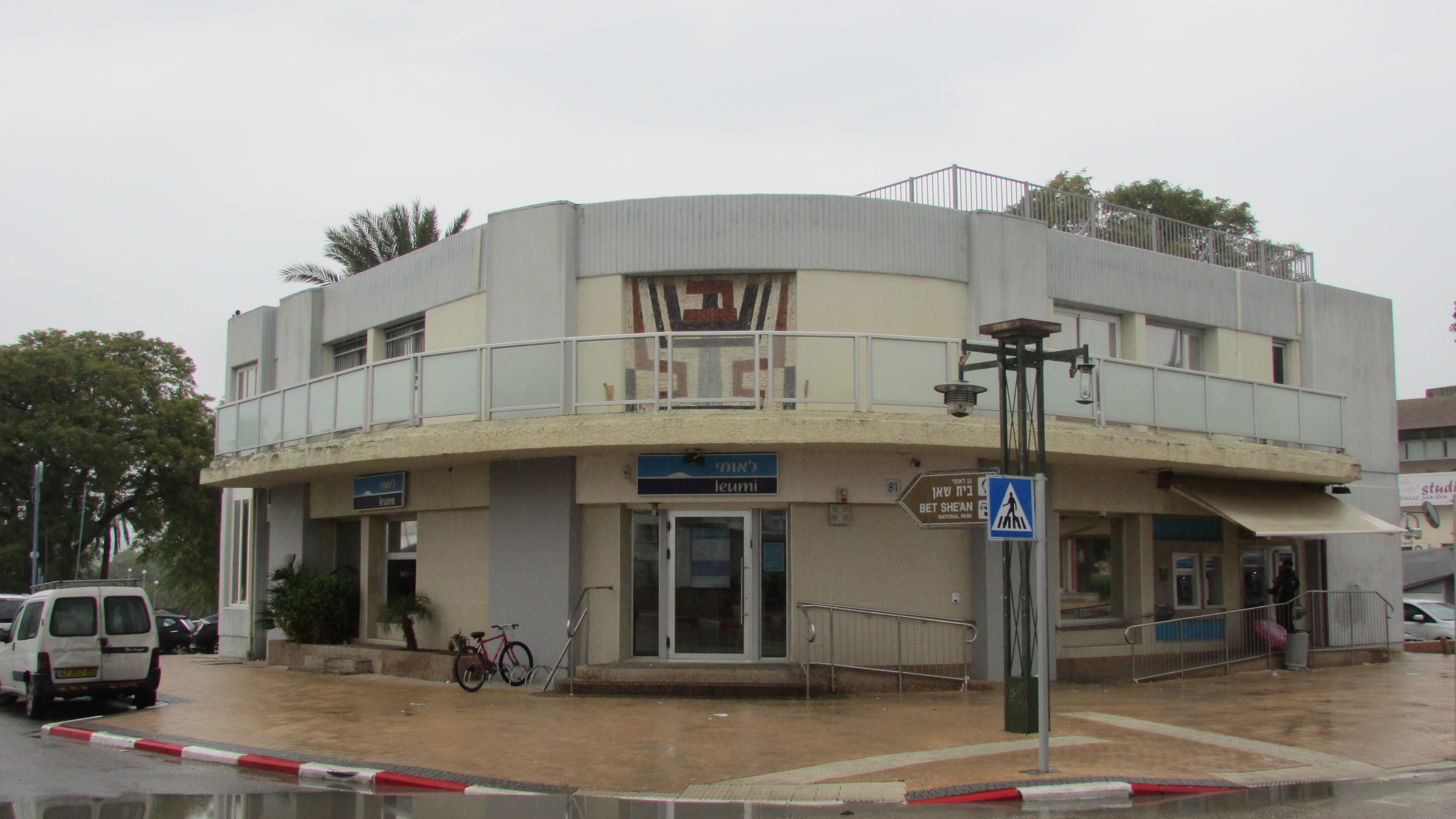
Bank Leumi branch in Beit She'an

Beit She'an is a center of cotton-growing, and many of residents are employed in the cotton fields of the surrounding kibbutzim. Other local industries include a textile mill and clothing factory.

=== Tourism ===
Ancient Beit She'an, one of the most spectacular Roman and Byzantine sites in Israel, is a major tourist attraction.

When the ancient city of Beit She'an was opened to the public in the 1990s and turned into a national park, tourism became a major sector of the economy.

== Transportation ==
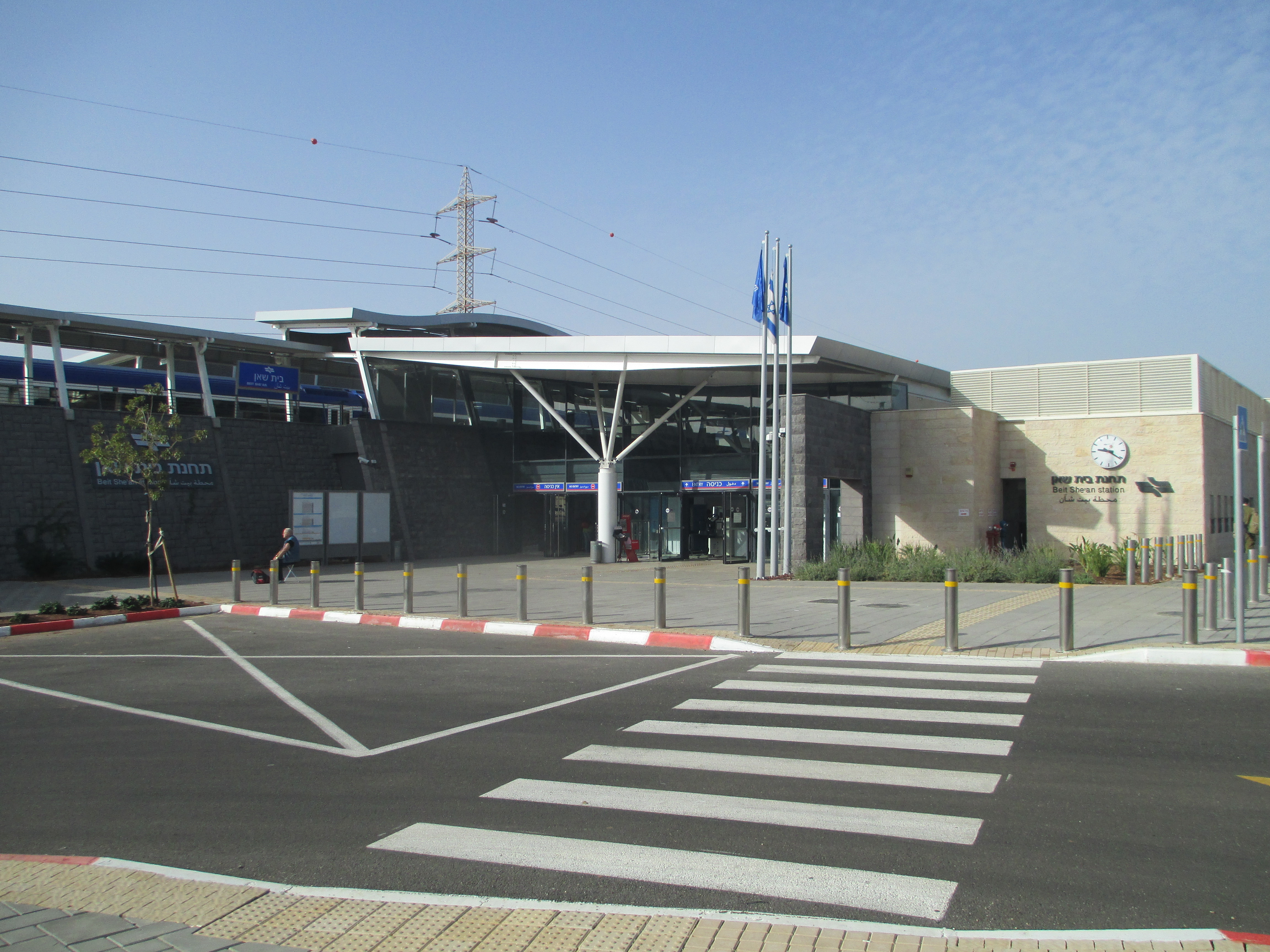
New railway station, Beit She'an

Beit She'an had a railway station that opened in 1904 on the Jezreel Valley railway which was an extension of the Hejaz railway. This station closed together with the rest of the Jezreel Valley railway in 1948.

In 2011–2016 the valley railway was rebuilt and the new Beit She'an railway station, located at the same site as the historical station was opened. Passenger service offered at the station connects the city to Afula, Haifa and destinations in between. In addition to passenger service, the station also includes a freight rail terminal.

== Sports ==
The local football club, Hapoel Beit She'an spent several seasons in the top division in the 1990s, but folded in 2006 after several relegations. Maccabi Beit She'an currently plays in Liga Bet.

== Voting Patterns ==
In the 2022 election, 90 percent of voters in Beit She'an voted for the parties of the right-wing coalition led by Benjamin Netanyahu, while 8 percent voted for the parties of the center-left coalition led by Yair Lapid and 0.1 percent voted for the Arab parties.

In the 2026 election, 85 percent of voters in Beit She'an voted for the parties of the right-wing coalition led by Benjamin Netanyahu, while 10 percent voted for the parties of the center-left coalition led by Gadi Eisenkot and 0.3 percent voted for the Arab parties. An additional 1.8 percent voted for the Reservists, and 1.5 percent voted for Amcha Yisrael. Voter turnout increased 12 percent from the 2022 election.

== Notable people ==
- Cyril of Scythopolis
- Severian of Scythopolis
- Ishtori Haparchi
- Naim Ateek
- David Levy
- Jackie Levy
- Orly Levy, politician (birthplace)

== Twin towns – sister cities ==
Beit She'an is twinned with:

- Cleveland, United States (Since 2019)

== Historic images ==
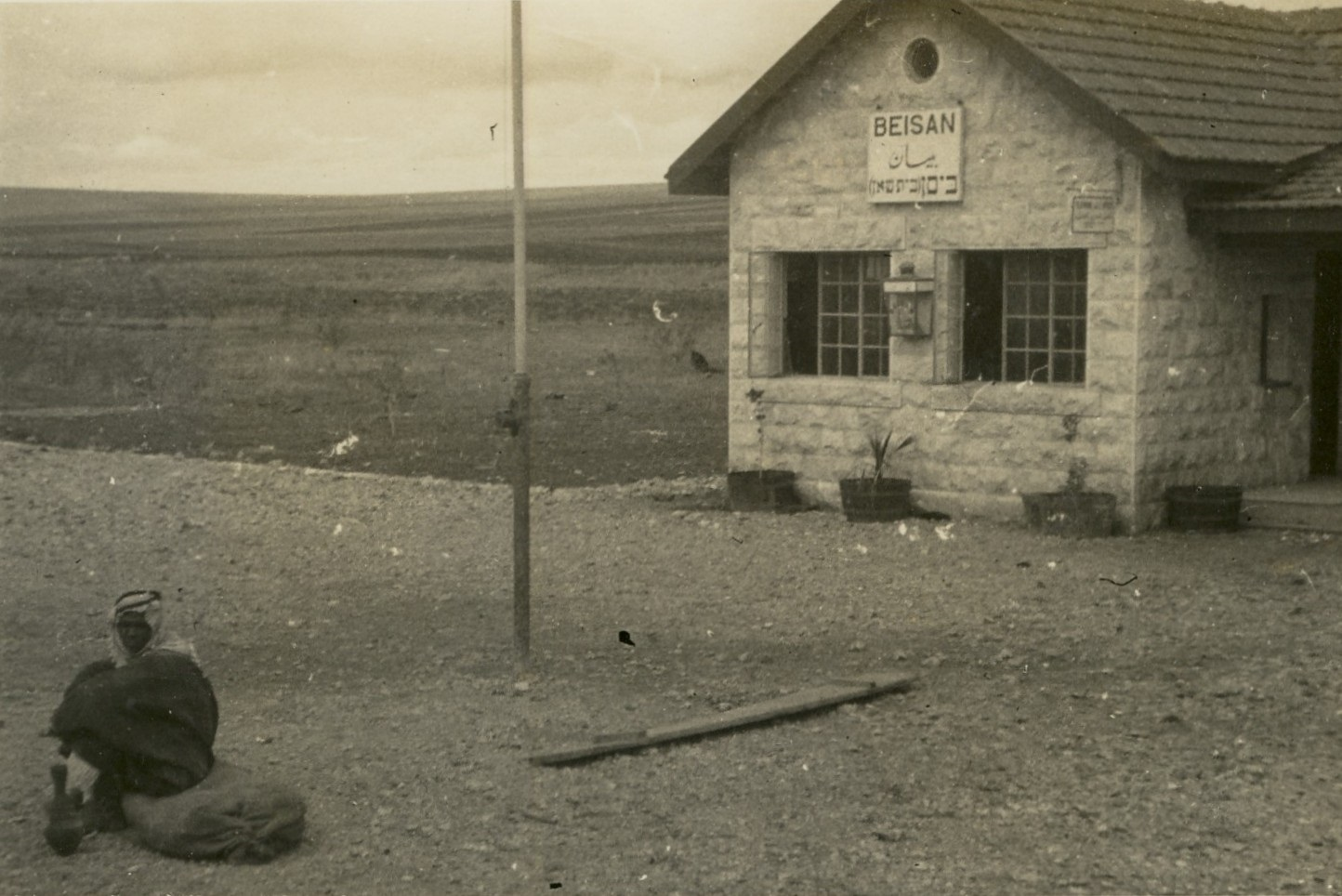
Historic railway station, 1930s

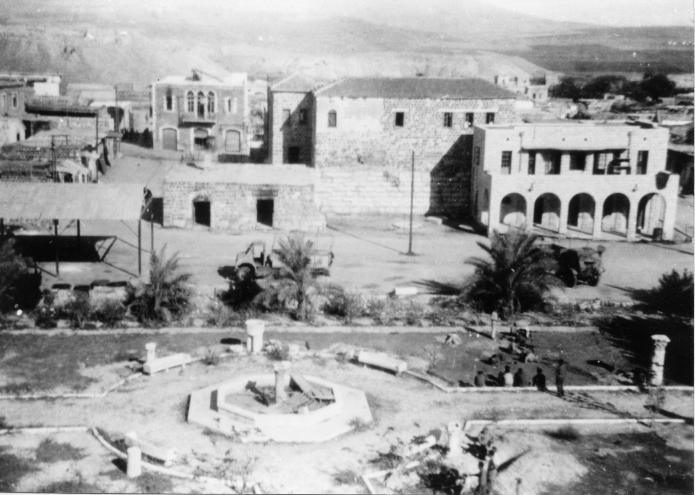
Beit She'an after conquest, 1948

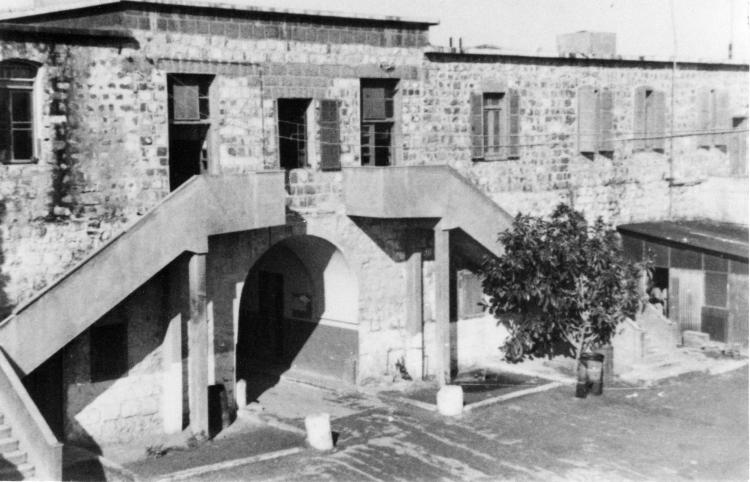
Ottoman Saray building used by Yiftach Brigade as company barracks, 1948

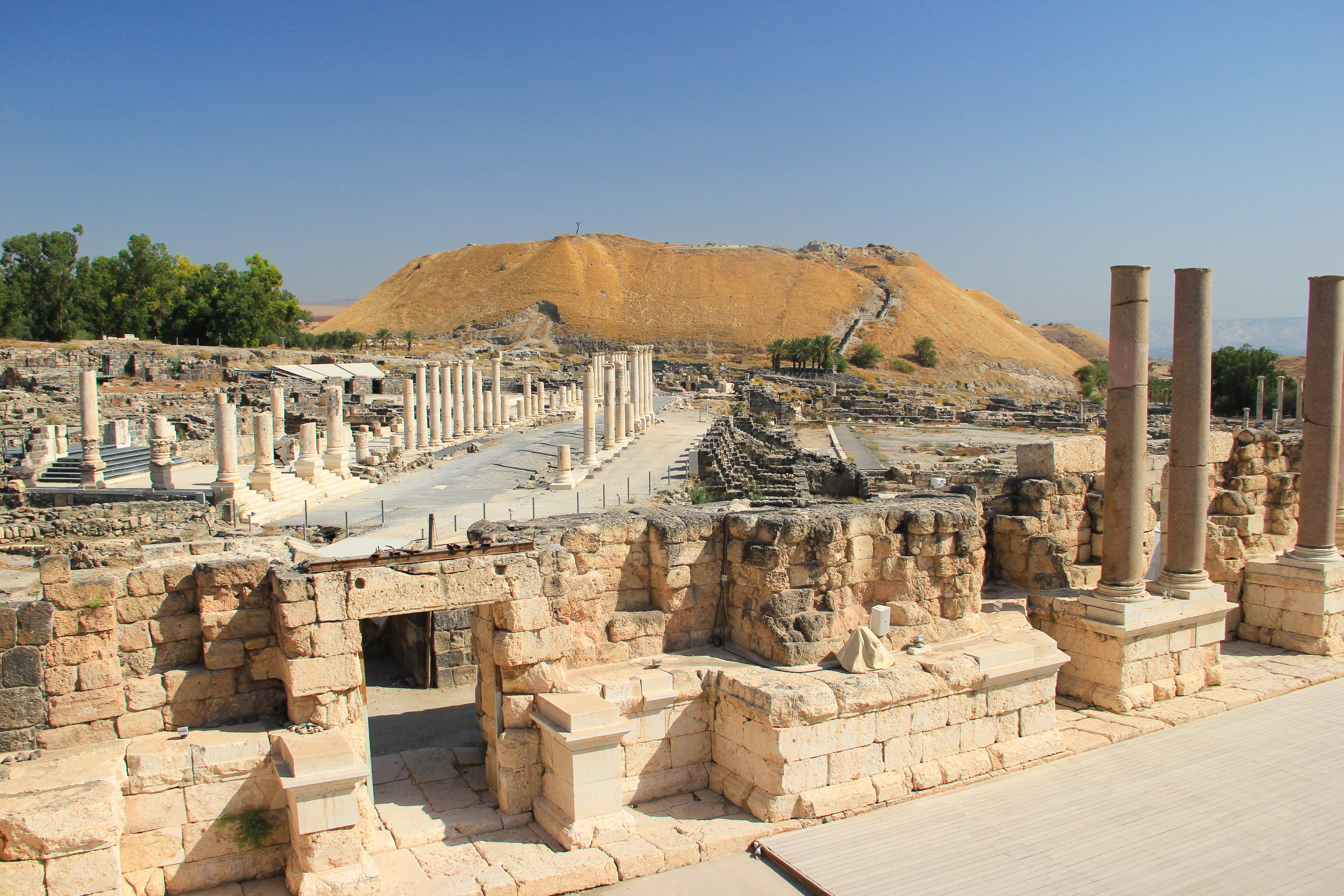
Beit Shean ruins

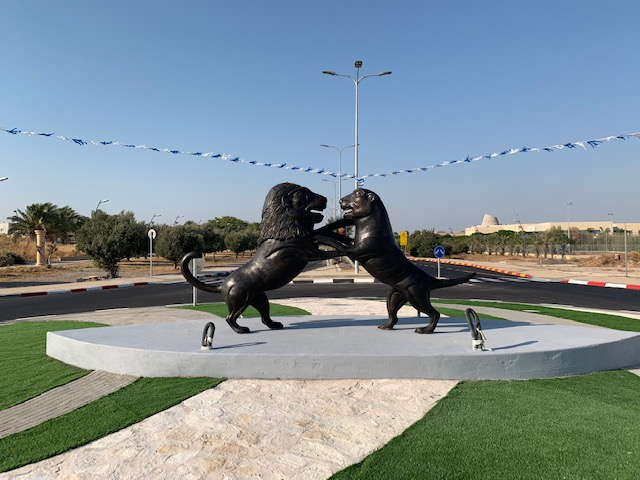
Lions playing sculpture, roundabout in Beit Shean

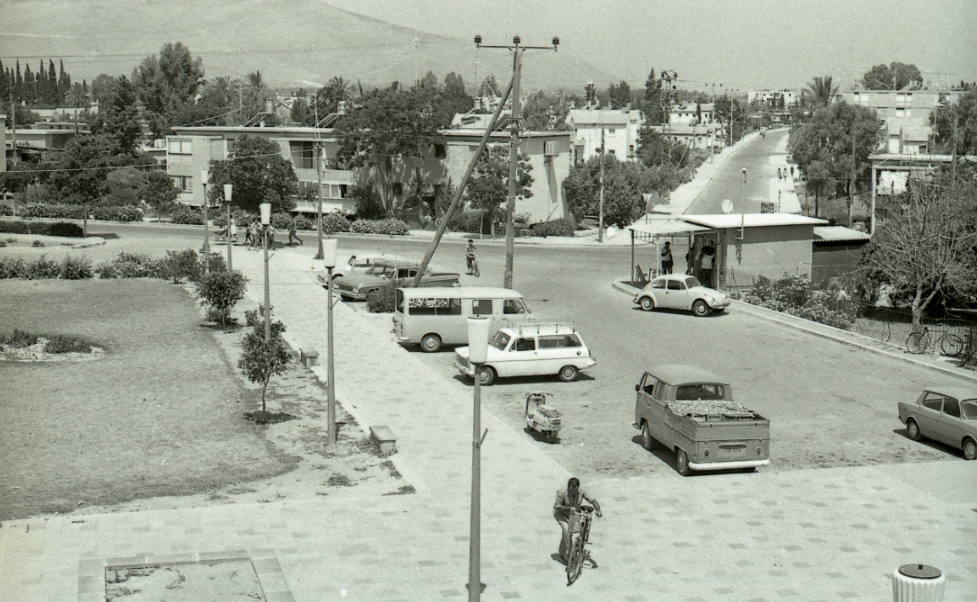
Beit She'an in 1970

== See also ==
- Scythopolis (see), the city's former archbishopric, now a Catholic Metropolitan titular see, aka Scitopoli
- Cities of the ancient Near East
- Jordan River Crossing
- Vassals of the Kingdom of Jerusalem

== Bibliography ==
- Barron, J. B., ed. (1923). Palestine: Report and General Abstracts of the Census of 1922. Government of Palestine.
- Conder, C.R.; Kitchener, H.H. (1882). The Survey of Western Palestine: Memoirs of the Topography, Orography, Hydrography, and Archaeology. Vol. 2. London: Committee of the Palestine Exploration Fund. (Conder and Kitchener, 1882, SWP II, p. 83)
- Dauphin, C. (1998). La Palestine byzantine, Peuplement et Populations. BAR International Series 726 (in French). Vol. III : Catalogue. Oxford: Archeopress. ISBN 978-0-86054-905-5. (p. 782)
- Department of Statistics (1945). Village Statistics, April, 1945. Government of Palestine. (Department of Statistics, 1945, p. 6)
- Guérin, V. (1874). Description Géographique Historique et Archéologique de la Palestine (in French). Vol. 2: Samarie, pt. 1. Paris: L'Imprimerie Nationale. (284- 298)
- Hadawi, S. (1970). Village Statistics of 1945: A Classification of Land and Area ownership in Palestine. Palestine Liberation Organization Research Centre. (pp. 43, 84134)
- Hütteroth, W.-D.; Abdulfattah, K. (1977). Historical Geography of Palestine, Transjordan and Southern Syria in the Late 16th Century. Erlanger Geographische Arbeiten, Sonderband 5. Erlangen, Germany: Vorstand der Fränkischen Geographischen Gesellschaft. ISBN 978-3-920405-41-4. (p. 168)
- Le Strange, G. (1890). Palestine Under the Moslems: A Description of Syria and the Holy Land from A.D. 650 to 1500. Committee of the Palestine Exploration Fund.
- Meyers, E. M.; Chancey, Mark A. (2012). Alexander to Constantine: Archaeology of the Land of the Bible, Volume III. Yale University Press. ISBN 978-0-300-14179-5.
- Mills, E., ed. (1932). Census of Palestine 1931. Population of Villages, Towns and Administrative Areas. Jerusalem: Government of Palestine.
- Morris, B. (2004). The Birth of the Palestinian Refugee Problem Revisited. Cambridge University Press. ISBN 978-0-521-00967-6.
- Shahin, Mariam (2005). Palestine: A Guide. Interlink Books. pp. 159–165. ISBN 978-1-56656-557-8.
- Sharon, M. (1999). Corpus Inscriptionum Arabicarum Palaestinae, B-C. Vol. 2. Brill. ISBN 978-90-04-11083-0. (see pp. 195)
- Tsafrir, Y. and Foerster, Gideon: "“Nysa-Scythopolis – A New Inscription and the Titles of the City on its Coins", The Israel Numismatic Journal. Vol. 9, 1986–7, pp. 53–58.
- Tsafrir, Y. and Foerster, Gideon: "Bet Shean Excavation Project – 1988/1989", Excavations and Surveys in Israel 1989/1990. Volume 9. Israel Antiquities Authority. Numbers 94–95. Jerusalem 1989/1990, pp. 120–128.
- Tsafrir, Y. and Foerster, Gideon: "From Scythopolis to Baisān: Changes in the perception of the city of Bet Shean during the Byzantine and Arab Eras", Cathedra. For the History of Eretz Israel and its Yishuv, 64. Yad Izhak Ben-Zvi. Jerusalem, July 1992 (in Hebrew).
- Tsafrir, Y. and Foerster, Gideon: "The Dating of the 'Earthquake of the Sabbatical Year of 749 C. E.' in Palestine", Bulletin of the School of Oriental and African Studies of London. Vol. LV, Part 2. London 1992, pp. 231–235.
- Tsafrir, Y. and Foerster, Gideon: "Urbanism at Scythopolis-Bet Shean in the Fourth to Seventh Centuries", Dumbarton Oaks Papers. Dumbarton Oaks Research Library and Collection. Number Fifty-One, 1997. pp. 85–146.
