= Alfred Mansfeld =

Israeli architect (1912–2004)

- אלפרד (אל) מנספלד
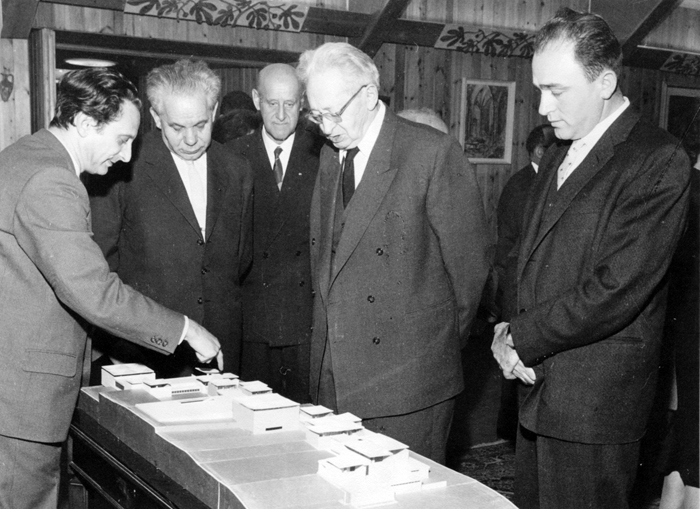
- Alfred Mansfeld presents the Israel Museum model to Yitzhak Ben-Zvi and Mordechai Ish-Shalom
- Born: 2 March 1912; Saint Petersburg, Russia
- Died: 15 March 2004 (aged 92); Haifa, Israel
- Education: Technische Hochschule Berlin, Germany; École Spéciale d'Architecture, Paris, France
- Occupation: Architect
- Known for: Designing the Israel Museum
- Awards: Israel Prize (1966); "Gold Plaquette" for Foreign Architects from the Association of German Architects (1969); Rechter Prize (1976)

Alfred (Al) Mansfeld (Hebrew: אלפרד (אל) מנספלד; 2 March 1912 – 15 March 2004) was an Israeli architect.

== Biography ==
Mansfeld was born in Saint Petersburg, Russia in 1912. While still a child, he moved with his family to Berlin, Germany. He began studying architecture in 1931 at the Technische Hochschule Berlin (now Technische Universität Berlin) but, with the rise of the Nazis to power, he moved in 1933 to Paris, France, where he completed his studies in 1935 at the École Spéciale d'Architecture, as a student of the architect, Auguste Perret, a pioneer of concrete construction. In 1935, he emigrated to Mandate Palestine.

From 1937 until 1959 Mansfield worked in partnership with Munio Gitai Weinraub. Their firm was held in high regard, and by the time the partnership ended, the office was among the largest in Israel. Together, Weinraub and Mansfield won eleven national architecture competitions. Mansfield's winning entry into the design competition for the Israel Museum, submitted without Weinraub, was the catalyst for terminating their partnership. In 1959 Mansfield set up his own practice. Following the dissolution of his partnership with Weinraub, there was a dispute between the pair about the attribution of a number of collaborative projects, as well as their shared archive of work. After Weinraub's death, some of the archive ended up in Paris, and in 2012 Mansfield's descendants successfully petitioned for the work to be returned to Israel, in accordance with Mansfield's wishes.

In 1949, Mansfied joined the faculty of the Technion – Israel Institute of Technology, where he taught for over forty years and was Dean of Faculty of Architecture from 1954 to 1956.

Mansfield was the senior partner in the Haifa firm of Mansfeld-Kehat Architects, which he founded, and of which his son, Michael Mansfeld, is a partner.

He died on 15 March 2004, at his home, designed by him, in central Carmel, Haifa, Israel.

== Selected projects ==
- The interior design of the Israel Museum, jointly with Dora Gad (1965);
- The interior design, together with architect Dora Gad, of the five ships of Zim, Israel's largest shipping company (1955–1975);
- Haifa Auditorium;
- Tikotin Museum of Japanese Art, Haifa;
- The Zim Building, Haifa;
- The Stella Maris neighbourhood in Haifa;
- The Wilfrid Israel Museum on Kibbutz HaZore'a;
- The master plan and the first buildings of the hospital in Nahariya;
- The Mazer Building (now the Feldman Building) on the Givat Ram campus of the Hebrew University of Jerusalem;
- Library and Administration Building at Yad Vashem, Jerusalem (with Munio Gitai Weinraub)

== Awards and honours ==
- In 1966, he won the Israel Prize, in architecture, jointly with Dora Gad, with whom he had designed the interior of Israel Museum.
- In 1969, he received the "Gold Plaquette" for Foreign Architects from the Association of German Architects (BDA - Bund Deutscher Architekten).
- In 1971, he was elected member of the Berlin Academy.
- In 1976, he was awarded the Rechter Prize, for planning the Stella Maris neighbourhood in Haifa.
- In 1983, he was elected an honorary member of the Paris Academy.
- In 2001, he received an honorable mention from the Architects Association.

== See also ==
- List of Israel Prize recipients
