= Munio Weinraub =

Israeli architect

Munio Gitai Weinraub
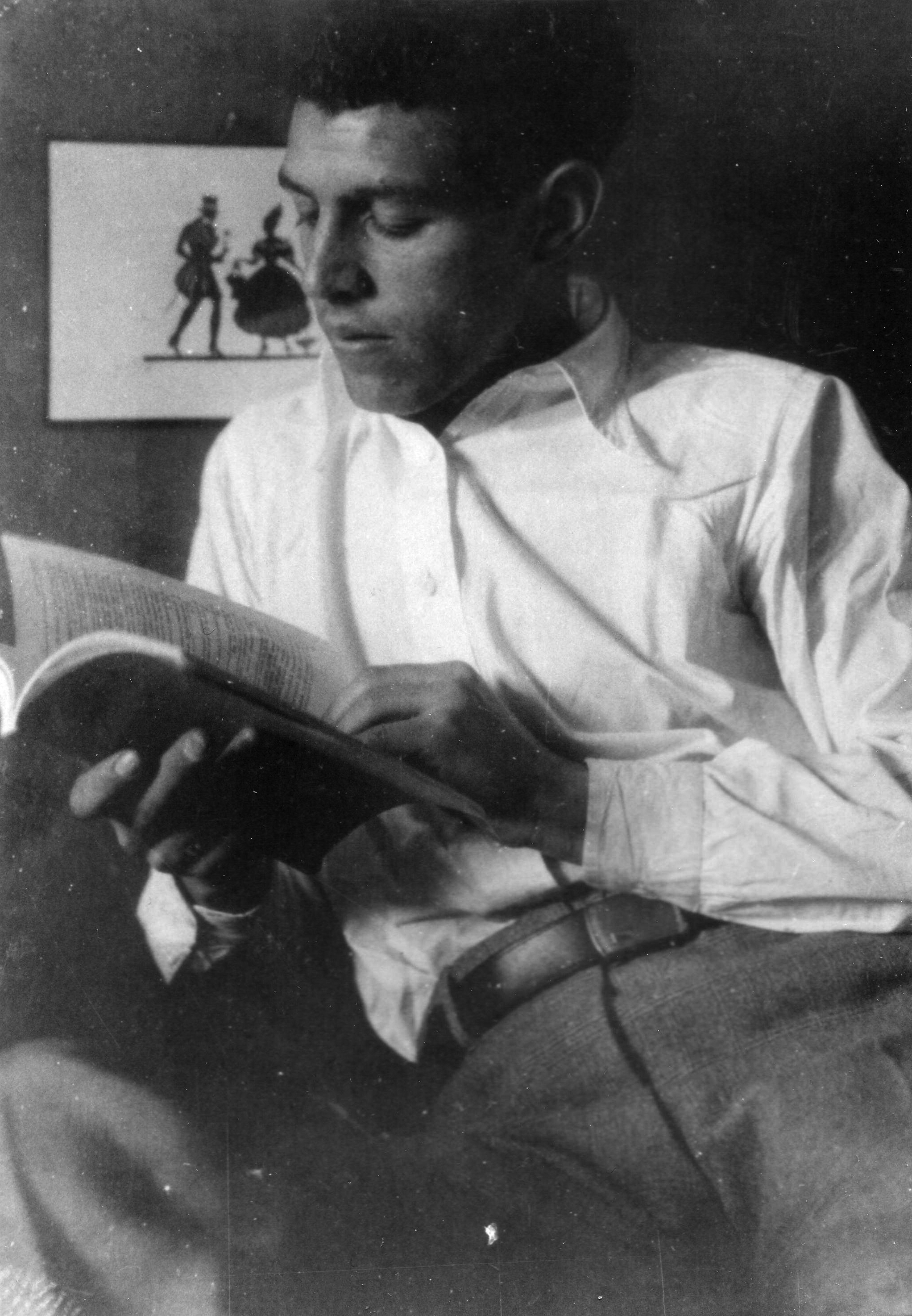
- Munio Gitai Weinraub, Bauhaus, 1930
- Born: March 6, 1909; Szumlany, Austrian Galicia
- Died: September 24, 1970 (aged 61); Haifa, Israel
- Occupation: Architect
- Years active: 1932-1970
- Known for: Administration and library building, Yad Vashem, The World Holocaust Remembrance Center, Jerusalem (1953-1955); The Hydraulic Institute, Technion, Haifa (1953-1956); Meiser Institute for Jewish Studies, Givat-Ram Campus, Hebrew University, Jerusalem (1955-1957); Lighthouse for the Blind, Kiryat Haim (1956-1958); Kiryat Hamemshala, Jerusalem
- Spouse: Efratia Munchik Margalit (1936-death)
- Children: Gideon Gitai (1940-2019); Amos Gitai

Munio Gitai Weinraub (March 6, 1909 – September 24, 1970) was a Polish-born Jewish architect who was part of the Bauhaus movement in Israel. Throughout his 36-year career, he was responsible for the planning and construction of thousands of housing units, including workers' housing and private homes in and around Haifa.

Weinraub also took part in the initial planning of the Hebrew University campus in Givat Ram and the Yad Vashem Museum in Jerusalem. From the beginning of his career, Weinraub sought to combine the values of Hannes Meyer's social planning with the construction art of his mentor and teacher Ludwig Mies van der Rohe. As such, his works are generally characterized by minimalist geometry. Similar to Mies van der Rohe, Weinraub chose to give up "problems of form" in order to dedicate himself to "problems of construction" and focus on engineering, the treatment of the material, and the processing of the architectural individual.

== Early life and education ==
Munio Gitai Weinraub was born in the small town of Szumlany in Galicia (now Ukraine). He grew up in the city of Bielsko, in Cieszyn Silesia, a city with a considerable German-speaking population in Poland. His father was a farm manager in the service of Polish landlords and his mother came from a wealthier background of small industrialists. He was the youngest of four sons and his childhood was overshadowed by World War I. After the war, Weinraub became a member of the Jewish youth group Hashomer Hatzair, a scouting organization that combined nature explorations similar to those of Baden-Powell's Scouts in the UK, and the romantic tendencies of the German Wandervögel groups, with the study of Zionist and Socialist ideologies.

At the age of eighteen, in 1927, when Weinraub applied for architecture studies at the Bauhaus School in Dessau, it was suggested to him to be first enrolled in the art school Tischlerschule in Berlin, where he studied drawing, perspective, traditional furniture design, woodwork, carpentry, and more. In 1930, he enrolled in Bauhaus.

== Work ==
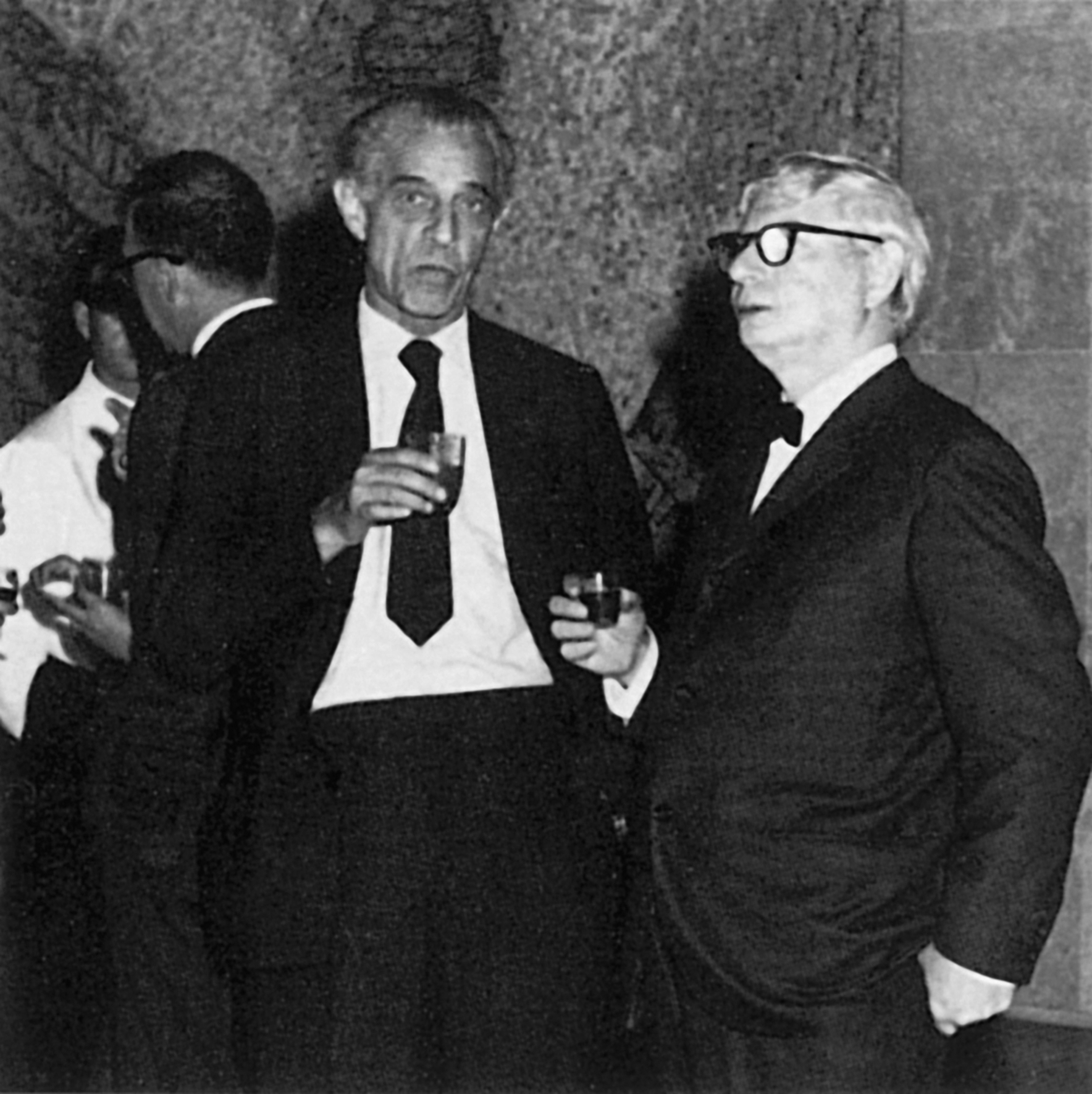
Munio Weinraub and Louis Kahn.

After his studies, Weinraub worked for Ludwig Mies van der Rohe, the Bauhaus director at the time. Mies hired him to work with him in his Berlin office, where his main responsibility was to supervise the installation of a number of works at the 1931 German Building Exhibition. In 1930, Weinraub was suspended due to "participating in political protests". Mies readmitted him into the school in 1931. With the rise of Nazism and the closure of the Bauhaus by Goebbels in 1933, Weinraub was arrested, beaten, and jailed on the pretext of “treason against the German people”. He was then expelled and found refuge in Switzerland, where he worked for the architect Moser in Zurich.

At the end of 1934, Weinraub left Europe and immigrated to Palestine and settled in Haifa, which was the urban base of the Hebrew labor movement. He maintained his relationship with the Kibbutz Hashomer Hatzair when he took part in the planning and design of sixteen of the movement's founding points. Weinraub was one of the few practicing architects in Palestine who worked according to the Bauhaus method.

=== Weinraub-Mansfeld ===
From 1937 to 1959, he worked in partnership with architect Al Mansfeld, with whom he founded the Weinraub-Mansfeld firm in 1935. Their work focused on serving local labor movement institutions and designing schools, cultural structures, factories, employee housing, kibbutzim, private residences, office buildings, and industrial facilities. Their work was noted for being "rigorously simple" and "stylistically conventional rather than vanguard".

In 1949, Weinraub was nominated as the head of the Department of Architecture in the planning office at the Ministry of Labor and Housing, directed by Arieh Sharon. This incurred involvement in the initial planning policy-making of Israel.In 1951, a Weinraub-Mansfeld collaboration won the entry for the site planning of the government center Ha-Kirya, in Jerusalem. The firm also won a dozen more national competitions during the 1950s.

During the 1950s, Weinraub and Mansfeld both began teaching at the Technion, in Haifa. Their academic roles, combined with the challenge of entering numerous architectural competitions, influenced their diverging theoretical conceptions and their collaboration ended in 1959. When Weinraub and Mansfeld dissolved their partnership, it was regularly published in Bauen und Wohnen, L'Architecture d'Aujourd'hui, and other international publications.

=== Solo career ===
Weinraub continued his career on his own, pursuing commissions for architecture, working for the labor federation, the kibbutzim, and various educational institutions. One of his final projects was the water tower at Gil Am (a youth rehabilitation institution in Shefar'am).

Apart from his activities as a designer and architect, Weinraub (like many architects of his generation) was also a furniture designer who created desk and chair designs for some large companies.

In the 36 years of his career, Weinraub had completed some 300 projects. Some of Weinraub’s buildings have now been remodeled, altered, or demolished.

== Notable projects ==
Many of the commissions Weinraub received were tied to the Histadrut's initiatives to promote Hebrew labor. He designed some of the industrial buildings of two prominent factories in the field of construction: the Phoenicia glass factory and the Vulcan iron and metal industries, both located in the estuary of the Kishon River in the Haifa Bay area. These factories were among the first on such a scale to be built in Palestine, and they played a significant role in changing the economic base of the region. For Phoenicia, he built a vast, clear-span, metal-ribbed structure with a pitched roof, and capped with pushed-up monitor clerestories for light and ventilation. However, the large production resembled a column-free basilica, and was one of the largest (if not the largest) spaces built in Palestine at the time. In 1941, the Phoenicia Glass factory was the first of the large building industries in Haifa to be purchased by Solel Boneh, a Histadrut-controlled company, followed by the Vulcan Metal Works, whose sheds and furnaces were designed by Weinraub in the same year.Weinraub planned two more factories that enabled the establishment of Kibbutz Kfar Masaryk, which sits halfway between Haifa and Acre: the Na’aman Brick and Tile Factory (1939–50) and the Askar Paint and Plaster Company (1938-1940). Two other projects were the design of the Lighthouse for the Blind, an educational institution in Kiryat Haim, and the new dining hall of Kibbutz Kfar Masaryk. Weinraub and Mansfeld planned many projects for the Histadrut institutions and its members, some which were completed, some not, including about 8,000 housing units for workers' subsidiaries such as Shikun-Ovdim and Solel-Boneh. The most prominent of these projects, apart from the Beit Hapoalim compound in Hadar, was the warehouse and office building of Hamashbir HaMarkasi, the cooperative that marketed the produce of all the collectives in the Hebrew community.

Apart from their projects in housing and work on industrial planning in the country, Weinraub and Mansfeld were also involved in three other major projects. The first was the design of the Yad Vashem Monument for Holocaust victims, the second was a construction plan for the government complex in Jerusalem, and the third was the building design of the Meiser Institute (now Feldman), one of the main buildings on the new campus of the Hebrew University of Givat Ram.

== Architectural approach ==
Weinraub was a Functionalist. Inspired by Mies, he denounced problems of form in favor of problems of construction. As he made sure to pay attention to the modes of production, Weinraub focused on the tectonic aspects of design so that the process of building could be properly done, and solved specific questions of how elements were to be joined and materials were to be finished. His buildings were composed of simple, well-proportioned volumes that fit in with their environments but looked small and plain, despite being very detailed. This approach was consistent with the theories of the Neu Sachlichkeit (new objectivity), a strain of unsentimental Functionalism that was prominent during the years of Weinraub's training in Germany.Although Weinraub was not overly concerned with architectural theory, his buildings display a coherent typological approach, which indicates a theoretical search for a humane Functionalism. The creative act in Weinraub's practice was based more on solving the problems of building and dwelling than on striving for stylistic originality. The sort of Functionalism he practiced was based on the rejection of individualism and image-consciousness in order to establish respect for how things are made, how things fit together, and how space is used. From the tiny cubicle houses in the workers’ suburbs of Haifa to his larger projects of the 1950s, as well as the Meiser Institute of the Hebrew University in Jerusalem, Weinraub's buildings have a distinct approach in their integration of materials, structure, and spatial organization.

== The Munio Gitai Weinraub Museum of Architecture ==
In 2014, the Munio Gitai Weinraub Architecture Museum opened in Haifa, in honor of Israeli architecture and dedicated to Weinraub's private collection. The museum was established by his son, Amos Gitai, and includes Weinraub's private archive and a room restoring the studio where he worked. The museum was established in collaboration with the Haifa Municipality and the Haifa Museums Company. The "Kowalski Efrat" office of the architects Zvi Efrat and Meira Kowalski was responsible for adapting the building to its purpose as a museum and Carmit Hernick Saar was responsible for its execution.

The museum's opening exhibition was 'The Architecture of Memory', curated by Amos Gitai. The exhibition was accompanied by the book Carmel, produced in collaboration with the Munio Gitai Weinraub Architecture Museum and the Haifa Museums.

Every year, the museum hosts several exhibitions on Israeli and international architecture, and various events such as conferences and public conversations with architects and artists.

Among the exhibitions held at the museum:

- Building of the Khan al-Ahmar Bedouin School, Curators: Amos Gitai, Sharon Yavo Ayalon, and Nitzan Satt, 2016.
- Public Housing, Curators: Sharon Yavo Ayalon and Nitzan Satt, 2016
- Ecological Ripples, Curator: Architect Dr. Joseph Cory, 2015.
- Industrial Urbanism: Places of production, Curator: Tali Hatuka, 2015
- Learning from Vernacular, For a New Vernacular Architecture, Curator: Pierre Frey, 2013
- Haifa Encounters: Arab-Jewish Architectural Collaboration during the British Mandate, Curators: Walid Karkabi and Adi Roitenberg, 2014.
- The Architecture of Memory, Curator: Amos Gitai, The Museum's Opening Exhibition, 2014.

== Personal life and death ==
In 1936, Weinraub married Efratia Margalit (Munchik) (1909–2004). The couple had two sons, photographer Gideon Gitai (1940-2019) and Israeli filmmaker Amos Gitai, who himself studied architecture at the Technion in Haifa and University of California, Berkeley.

In the 1960's, he Hebraized his surname to Gitai.

In 2012, the film "A Lullaby for My Father" directed by Amos Gitai was released.

He died from colon cancer in Haifa in 1970 at the age of 61, buried in Kibbutz Kfar Masaryk.

== Bibliography ==
- Richard Ingersoll, Munio Gitai Weinraub: Bauhaus architect in Eretz Israel (photographs by Gabriele Basilico), Millan: Electa, 1994. (published in conjunction with the exhibition at the Israel Museum, Jerusalem ’Munio Gitai Weintraub : building for a working society’, 17 May-31 October 1994.)
- Olivier Cinqualbre, Lionel Richard, Munio Weinraub Gitai: Szumlany, Dessau, Haïfa: parcours d'un architecte moderne, Paris: Centre Pompidou, 2001.
- Town planning in Israel: New Towns for a New State, Building Digest, 10:11, November 1950.
- Israël centre de culture à Kiryat Haim, près de Haifa, Technique & Architecture, 10:1-2, pp. 94–95, 1951.
- Ha-Kirya: Der Regierungssitz Israels Architekten Munio Weinraub und Al Mansfeld, Plan: Revue suisse d'unrbanisme, 9:3, p. 92, May–June 1952.
- "Immeubles à Haifa, Israël", L'Architecture d'aujourd'hui, 25:57, p. 96, 1954
