= Bet She'an Valley natural region =

Coordinates: 32°30′00″N 35°30′00″E

Bet She'an Valley Natural Region
- Natural Region
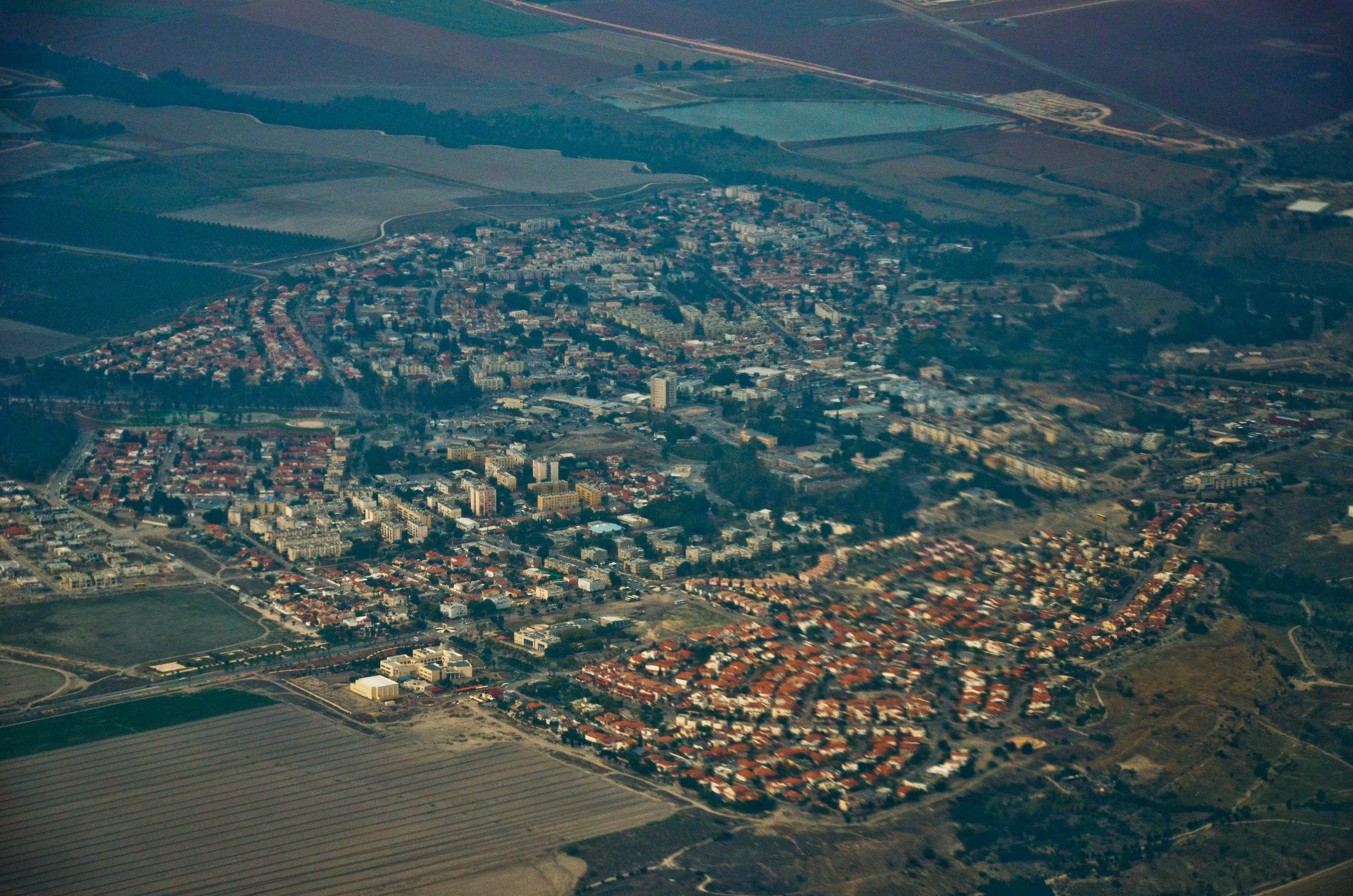
- View of Beit She'an
- Interactive map of Bet She'an Valley Natural Region
- Country: Israel
- District: Northern
- Subdistrict: Jezreel
- Largest City: Beit She'an

Area
  - Total: 217 km^{2} (84 sq mi)

Population (2024)
  - Total: 36,881

Ethnicity
  - Jews and others: 95.5%
  - Arabs: 0.8%

The Bet She'an Valley Natural Region or Beit She'an Valley Natural Region is a natural region in the Jezreel Subdistrict, in the Northern District of Israel. It is largely coextensive with the Emek HaMaayanot Regional Council. Beit She'an is the largest city in the natural region.

== Geography ==
Districts, Subdistricts and Natural Regions of the State of Israel, 2018

The natural region consists of the southeastern portion of the Jezreel subdistrict, adjacent to the West Bank and bordered by Jordan on the east, which here follows the Jordan River. It has an area of 217 km^{2}.

== Demographics ==
The largest city is Beit She'an, containing 55 percent of the natural region's population.

The vast majority of the population of the natural region are Jewish. There are no Arab towns in the region.

Historical population
Year	Pop.	±%
1972	17,300	—
1983	20,400	+17.9%
1995	22,100	+8.3%
2008	27,700	+25.3%
2022	35,035	+26.5%
2024	36,881	+5.3%

== Administrative local authorities ==
Cities	Local Councils	Villages
Bet She'an	[None]	Valley of Springs (formerly Beit She'an Valley): Beit Yosef; Ein HaNetziv; Gesher; Hamadia; Kfar Ruppin; Ma'ale Gilboa; Ma'oz Haim; Menahemia; Meirav; Mesilot; Meital; Neve Eitan; Neve Ur; Nir David; Rehov; Reshafim; Revaya; Sde Eliyahu; Sde Nahum; Sde Trumot; Tel Te'omim; Tirat Zvi; Yardena

== Politics ==
In the 2022 election, 74 percent of voters in the natural region voted for the parties of the right-wing coalition led by Benjamin Netanyahu, and 26 percent voted for the parties of the center-left coalition led by Yair Lapid. The Arab parties received no significant support.

In the 2026 election, 67 percent of voters in the natural region voted for the parties of the right-wing coalition led by Benjamin Netanyahu, while 26 percent voted for the parties of the center-left coalition led by Gadi Eisenkot and 0.3 percent voted for the Arab parties. An additional 2.8 percent voted for the Reservists, and 3.3 percent voted for Amcha Yisrael. Voter turnout increased 14 percent from the 2022 election.

== Transportation ==
Beit She'an is the final station of the Jezreel Valley railway, which connects the area to Afula and Haifa.
