= Meirav =

Meirav: מירב (Hebrew)
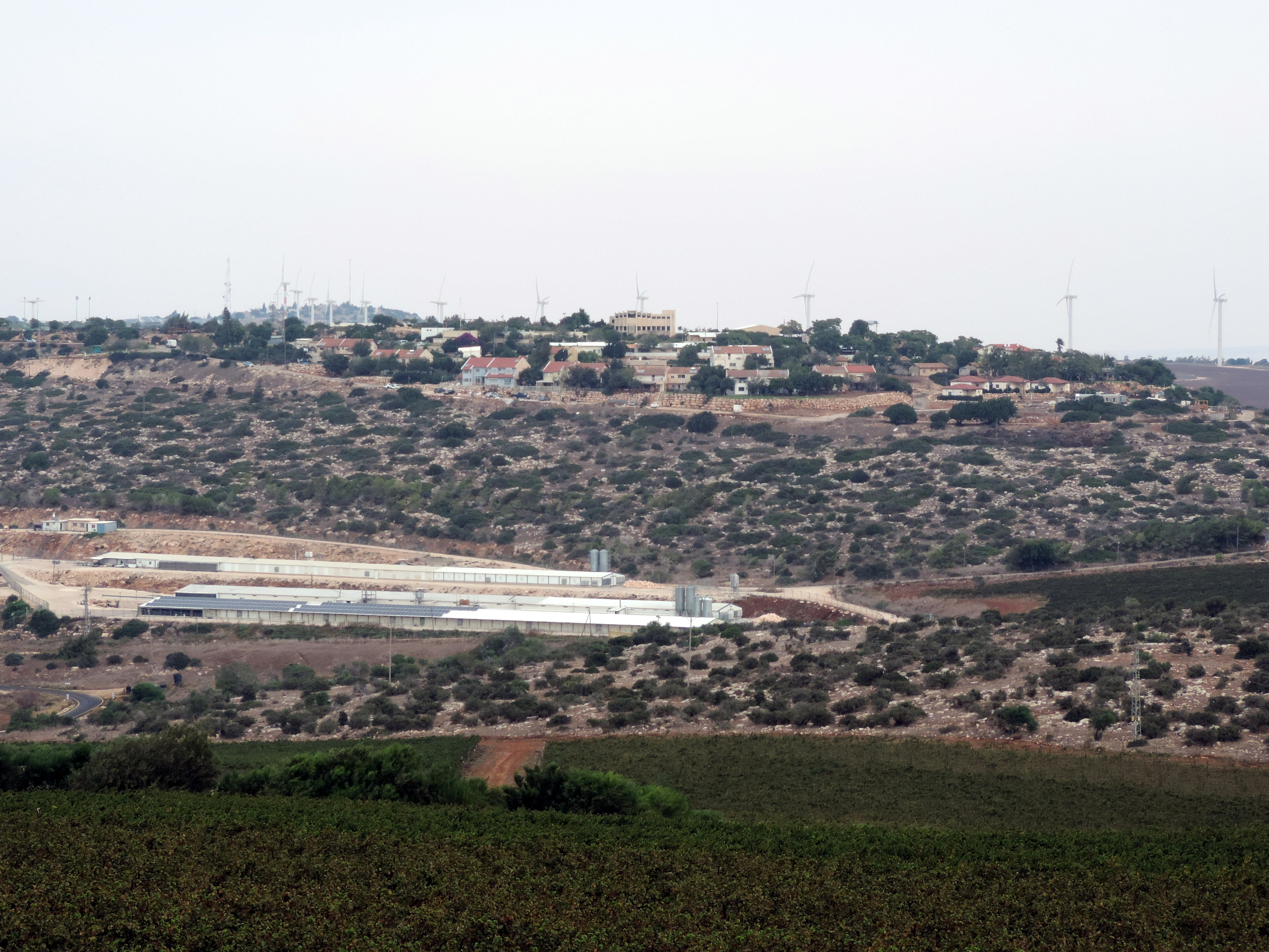

- Location within Jezreel Valley region of Israel Location within Israel
- Coordinates: 32°27′6″N 35°25′18″E
- Country: Israel
- District: Northern
- Subdistrict: Jezreel
- Council: Valley of Springs
- Affiliation: Religious Kibbutz Movement
- Founded: 1982 (original location); 1987 (current location)
- Founder: Nahal
- Population (2024): 858
- Website: www.merav.net

Meirav (Hebrew: מירב) is a religious kibbutz in northern Israel. Located on the downward slopes of Mount Gilboa around ten kilometres southwest of Beit She'an and less than 500 metres from the Green Line, it falls under the jurisdiction of Valley of Springs Regional Council. In 2024 it had a population of 858.

== Etymology ==
Some people connect the name "Meirav" to the story of Saul's death in the Battle of Gilboa against the Philistines, which is believed to have occurred nearby, because Saul's oldest daughter was named Meirav (1 Samuel 14:50). However, the name can also be interpreted as meaning "a lot of water" and " the most of".

== History ==
The kibbutz was founded initially as a Nahal settlement on Mount Malkishua in 1982, and is the newest religious kibbutz in the country. In 1987, it moved to its current location on Mount Avinadav.

Meirav is located just south of another religious kibbutz, Ma'ale Gilboa. As they are both religious kibbutzim, it was decided that although they are located in the Gilboa mountains (and would naturally fall under the jurisdiction of Gilboa Regional Council), it would be better to include them in Beit She'an Valley Regional Council, where there is a group of religious kibbutzim, including Ein HaNatziv, Sde Eliyahu, Shluhot and Tirat Zvi.

On 18 November 2011, Haaretz reported that the route of the separation barrier near kibbutz Meirav has been changed so that about 1,500 dunams (375 acres) of West Bank land would be on the Israeli side. Assigned to the kibbutz by the Israel Lands Administration (ILA), the parcel of privately owned Palestinian land, which was registered as such with the Israeli authorities, was transferred to the kibbutz, which is located about seven kilometers northwest of it. It is thought to be the first instance of Palestinian-owned land being transferred to a community on Israeli territory within the Green line. According to Haaretz, the ILA, which has no authority in the West Bank and had no right to transfer the privately owned Palestinian land to the kibbutz, informed the kibbutz in January 2012 that the land was being removed from their allotted slot. Nevertheless, the kibbutz continued to cultivate the land. As Haaretz reports, the land is to be returned to its Palestinian owners after the ILA admitted its mistake in a letter to the Palestinian landowner's attorney in February 2013.

== Economy ==
As well as agriculture, the kibbutz also has a candle factory. Until 2001, it employed around 100 Palestinians from the nearby West Bank village of Jalbun. However, a terrorist attack on the kibbutz's residents, resulting in the death of a young girl, and another in Beit She'an led to the building of a fence between the two communities, resulting in the Palestinians losing their jobs.
