= Religious Kibbutz Movement =

Organization for Orthodox kibbutzim

The Religious Kibbutz Movement (Hebrew: הקיבוץ הדתי, HaKibbutz HaDati) is an organizational framework for Orthodox kibbutzim in Israel. Its membership includes 22 communities, 16 of them traditional kibbutzim, and 6 others in the category of Moshav shitufi, meaning that they have no communal dining hall or children's house but maintain a shared economy. The Religious Kibbutz Movement has about 15,000 members. It is not part of the secular Kibbutz Movement with its c. 230 kibbutzim, and it does not include the two Poalei Agudat Yisrael-affiliated religious kibbutzim.

== History ==
The Religious Kibbutz Movement was founded in 1935 by groups of Jewish pioneers who immigrated to Palestine from Europe. It was the fourth kibbutz movement established in Palestine, after Hever Hakvutzot, HaKibbutz HaMeuhad and Hashomer Hatzair. From the outset, the policy of this movement was settlement in clusters, due to the need for religious schooling. Another consideration was the desire to counteract the influences of a secular environment: A single religious kibbutz in a non-religious environment would find it difficult to defend its religious and social principles. Bloc settlement also created the possibility for mutual assistance, with veteran settlements sharing their experience with those that came later.

== Settlement blocs ==
In 1937–1948, the Religious Kibbutz Movement established three settlement blocs of three kibbutzim each. The first was in the Beit Shean Valley (Tirat Zvi, Sde Eliyahu and Ein HaNetziv) the second was in the Hebron mountains south of Bethlehem (known as Gush Etzion: Kfar Etzion, Masu'ot Yitzhak and Ein Tzurim), and the third was in the western Negev (Sa'ad and Be'erot Yitzhak). Another kibbutz, Yavne, was founded in the center of the country as the core of a fourth bloc which only came into being after the establishment of the state.

== Current trends ==
Many kibbutzim of the Religious Kibbutz Movement are in the midst of privatization, similar to the trend in non-religious kibbutzim. The movement operates a number of educational institutions, including Yeshivat HaKibbutz HaDati (Ein Tzurim), Yeshivat Ma'ale Gilboa, Ein HaNatziv Women's Seminary, the Yaacov Herzog Institute for Jewish Studies, a school for post-military Jewish studies for women on Massuot Yitzhak, a Field School And a women's Yeshiva (branch of Drisha Institute) in Kfar Etzion. Three kibbutzim, Beerot Yitzhak, Sde Eliyahu and Yavneh, also offer 5-month ulpan (Hebrew language study) programs for participants from abroad.

== List of member kibbutzim ==
Lower Galilee

- Beit Rimon
- Lavi
- Nir Etzion (Moshav Shitufi)

Mount Gilboa

- Ma'ale Gilboa
- Meirav

Beit She'an Valley

- Ein HaNatziv
- Sde Eliyahu
- Shluhot
- Tirat Zvi
- Shadmot Mehola (moshav shitufi)

Center

- Be'erot Yitzhak
- Kvutzat Yavne

Gush Etzion

- Kfar Etzion
- Migdal Oz
- Rosh Tzurim

Shafir Region

- Ein Tzurim
- Massuot Yitzhak (moshav shitufi)

Western Negev

- Alumim
- Sa'ad

Har Hevron Region

- Beit Yatir (moshav shitufi)
- Ma'on (moshav shitufi)
- Carmel (moshav shitufi)

== See also ==
- Settlement movement (Israel), the wider communal settlement movement within the pre-1967 borders
- Midreshet Ein HaNetziv
- Yossi Kats, (1995). "The Religious Kibbutz Movement and Its Credo, 1935-48". Middle Eastern Studies, 31(2), 253–280. JSTOR https://www.jstor.org/stable/4283715
- Yossi Kats, (1999), The Religious Kibbutz Movement in the Land of Israel, Jerusalem: Magnes Press. ISBN 978-965-493-007-9.
- Kats, Yossi (2007). The Religious Kibbutz During the Mandate Period (in Hebrew). Jerusalem: Bar-Ilan University. ISBN 965-226-171-8.
