= Ma'ale Gilboa =

Kibbutz in northern Israel

Ma'ale Gilboa: מעלה גלבוע (Hebrew)
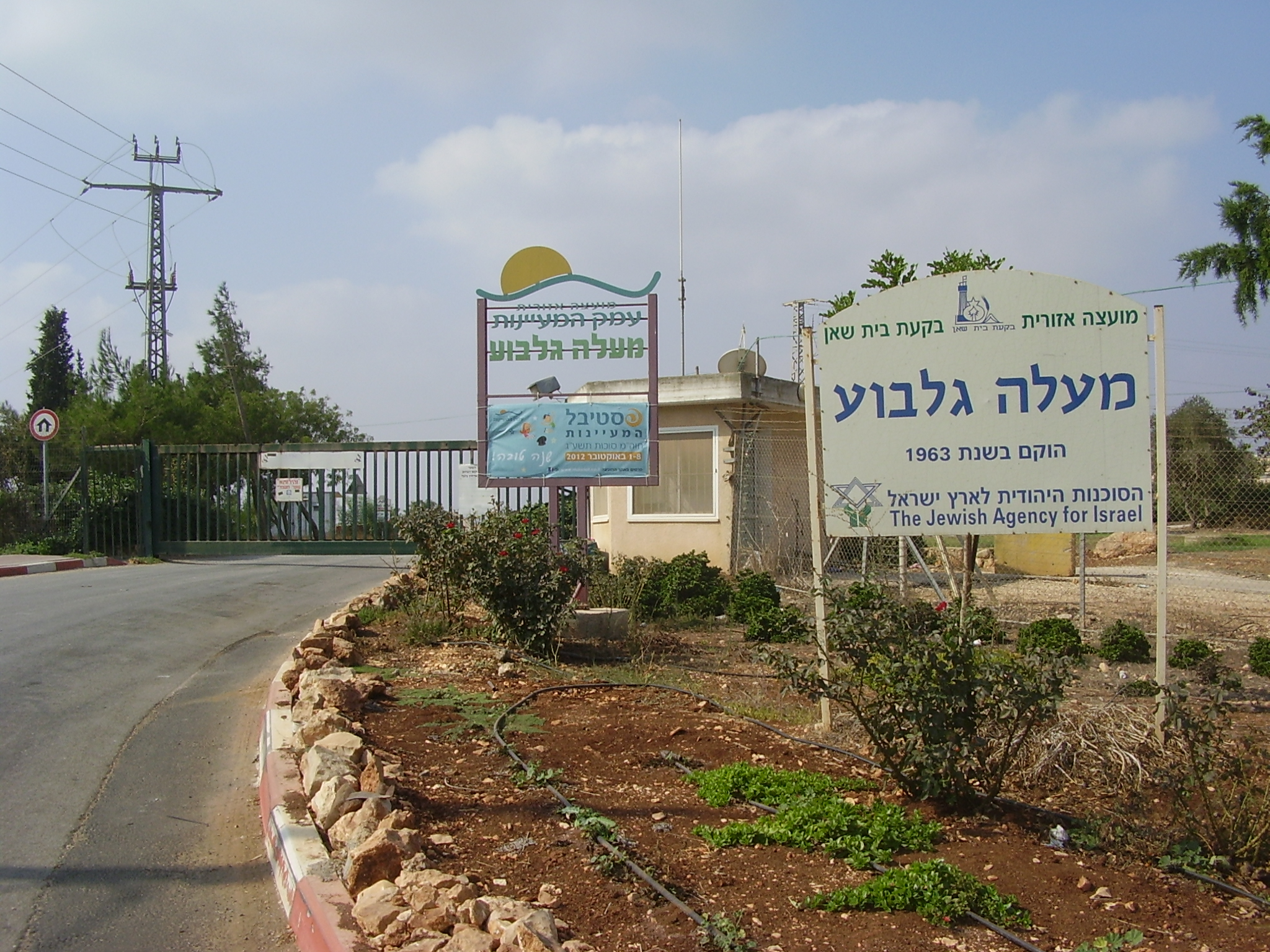
- Etymology: Gilboa Ascent
- Location within Jezreel Valley region of Israel Location within Israel
- Coordinates: 32°28′35″N 35°25′13″E
- Country: Israel
- District: Northern
- Subdistrict: Jezreel
- Council: Valley of Springs
- Affiliation: Religious Kibbutz Movement
- Founded: 1963
- Founder: Nahal
- Population (2024): 921

Ma'ale Gilboa (Hebrew: מעלה גלבוע, lit. 'Gilboa Ascent') is a religious kibbutz located on the summit of Mount Gilboa, on the northeast end of the ridge of the Samarian hills in Israel. Located about 5 km west of Beit She'an, it falls under the jurisdiction of Beit She'an Valley Regional Council. In 2024 it had a population of 921.

== History ==
The kibbutz was founded in 1962 as a Nahal settlement, on the lands of the depopulated Palestinian village of Khirbat al-Jawfa. It is located across the Green Line from Faqqu'a.

In 1967 it was settled by members of the Religious Kibbutz Movement. Ma'ale Gilboa is located just north of another religious kibbutz, Meirav. As they are both religious kibbutzim, it was decided that, although they are located in the Gilboa mountains (and would naturally fall under the jurisdiction of Gilboa Regional Council) it would be better to include them in Beit She'an Valley Regional Council, where there is a group of religious kibbutzim, including Ein HaNatziv, Sde Eliyahu, Shluhot and Tirat Zvi.

In 1997, after economic and social hardships, the kibbutz faced a crisis and was almost dissolved. Today the economy of the kibbutz is thriving; the kibbutz has managed to repay its debts and has recorded a profit. As with most kibbutzim in Israel today, Ma'ale Gilboa is in the process of privatization. Some aspects of the socialist kibbutz structure are disappearing, and individual services for members of the kibbutz are translated into their economic value. As a result, the kibbutz is not only enjoying economic prosperity but is growing demographically as well. In 2007-2008 the kibbutz began building additional housing units for families interested in joining the community.

The main sources of livelihood are agricultural; growing carrots, dairy farming, and raising turkeys for meat. Most of the members and residents of the community work off the kibbutz.

== Education ==
Notably, the kibbutz houses Yeshivat Ma'ale Gilboa, which, following the closure of Yeshivat Ein Tzurim is currently the only functioning yeshivat shiluv, which combine two years of Torah study with three years of army service. This is in contrast to Hesder yeshivot, which combine a year and a half of army with three and a half years of Torah study.
