= Beit Yosef, Israel =

Moshav in northern Israel

Beit Yosef: בית יוסף (Hebrew)
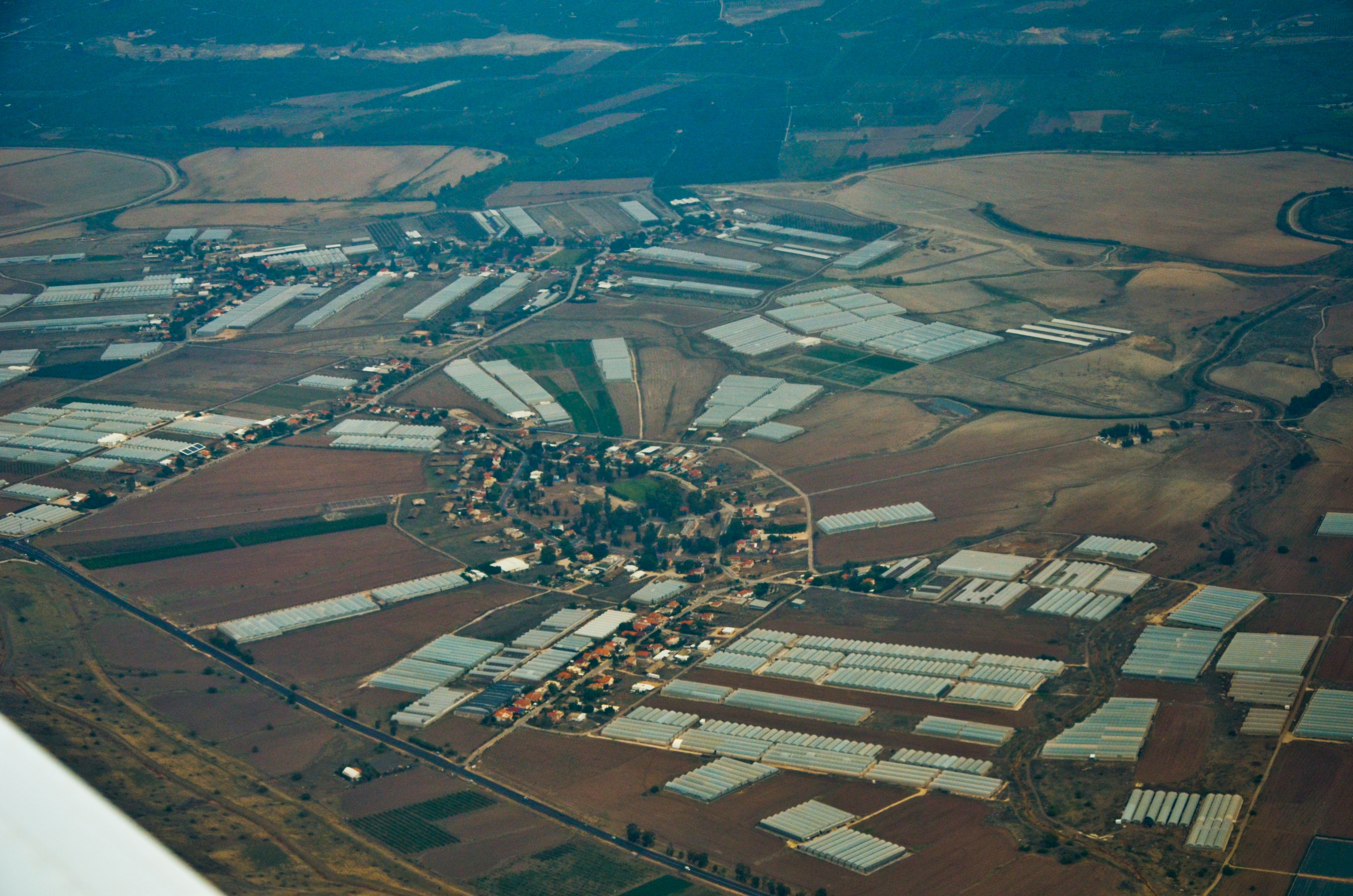

- Location within Jezreel Valley region of Israel Location within Israel
- Coordinates: 32°33′31″N 35°33′6″E
- Country: Israel
- District: Northern
- Subdistrict: Jezreel
- Council: Valley of Springs
- Affiliation: Moshavim Movement
- Founded: 1937
- Population (2024): 606

Beit Yosef (Hebrew: בית יוסף) is a moshav in northern Israel. Located in the Beit She'an Valley about eight kilometres north of Beit She'an, adjacent to Yardena, it falls under the jurisdiction of Valley of Springs Regional Council. As of 2024 it had a population of 606.

== History ==
Beit Yosef was founded in 1937 as a tower and stockade settlement, a series of settlements erected during the 1936–1939 Arab revolt in Palestine. It was named for Yosef Aharonovitch, an influential figure in the Labor Party and a journalist. By 1947 it had a population of over 200. Although it was abandoned during the 1948 Arab–Israeli War after it was severely attacked by the Jordanian Arab Legion and Iraqi Army, it was re-established in 1951 by immigrants from Kurdistan and Iraq.

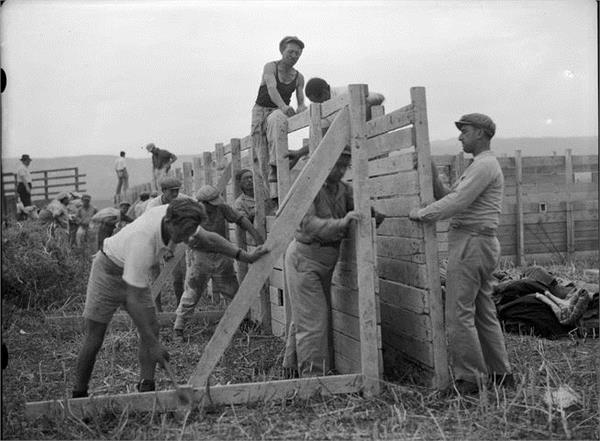
Construction of stockade wall, 1 April 1937

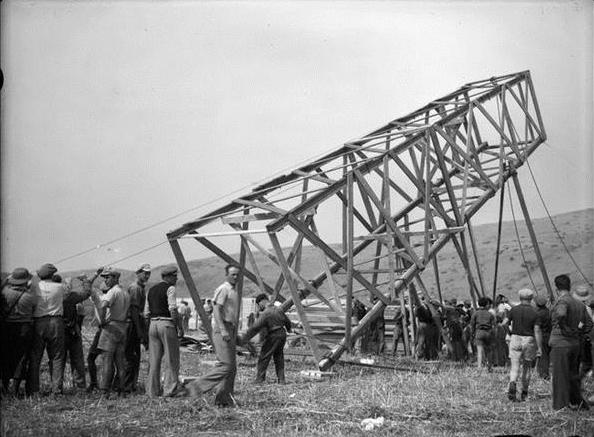
Pre-constructed watch tower installed, 1 April 1937

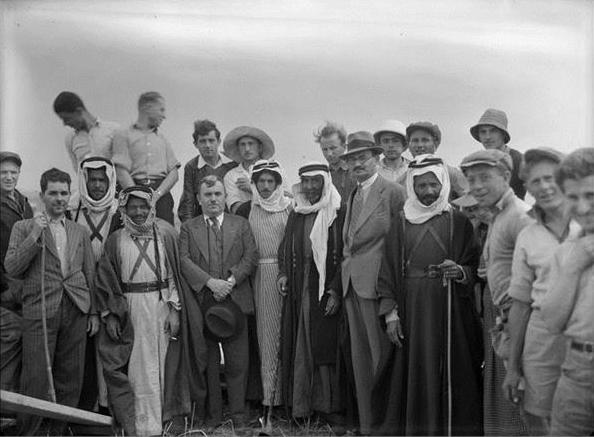
Local villagers visit construction site, 1 April 1937

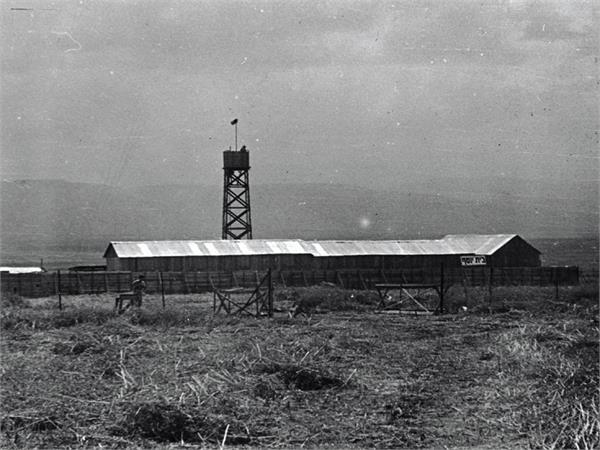
Beit Yosef 1937

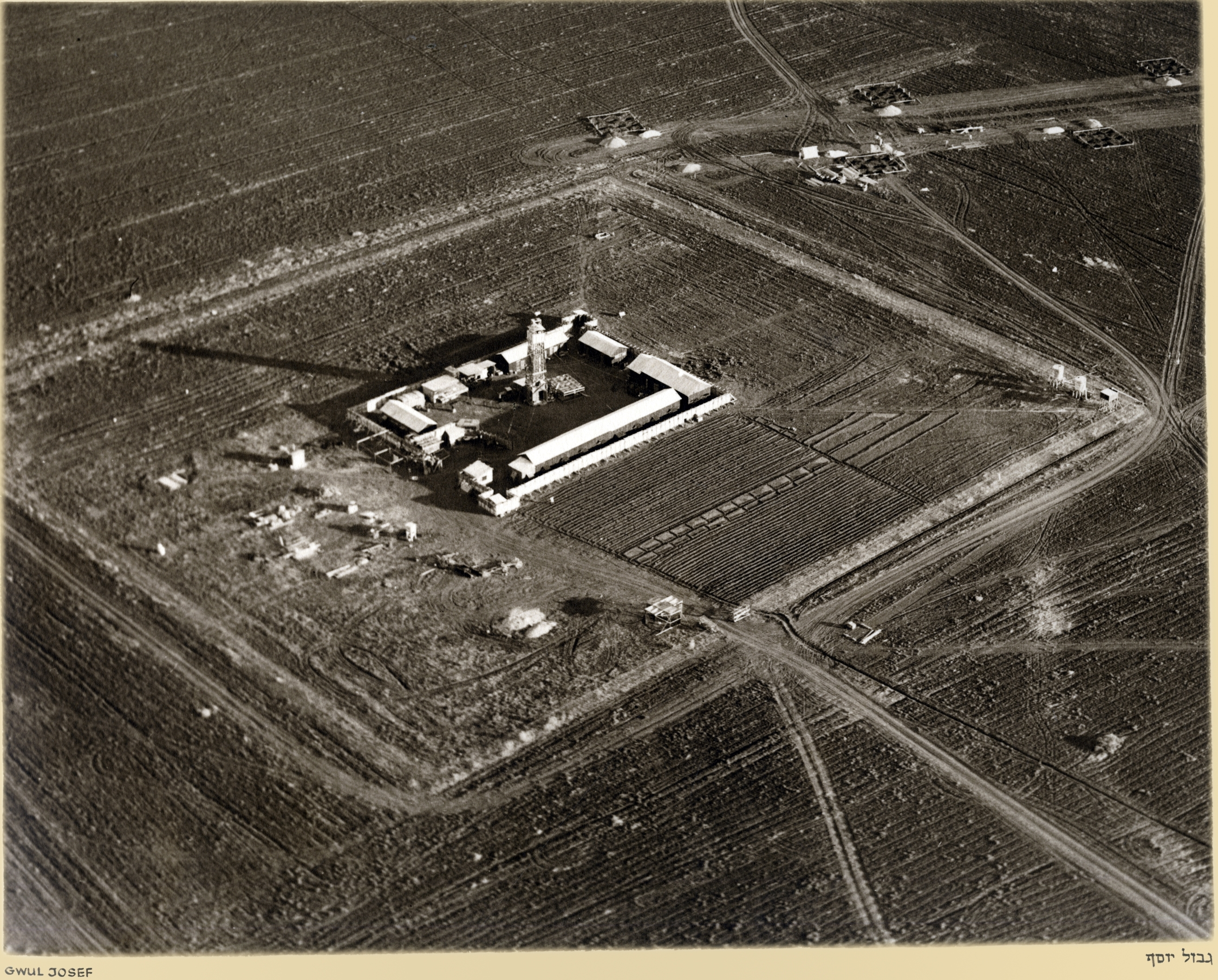
Aerial view of Beit Yosef, April 1937

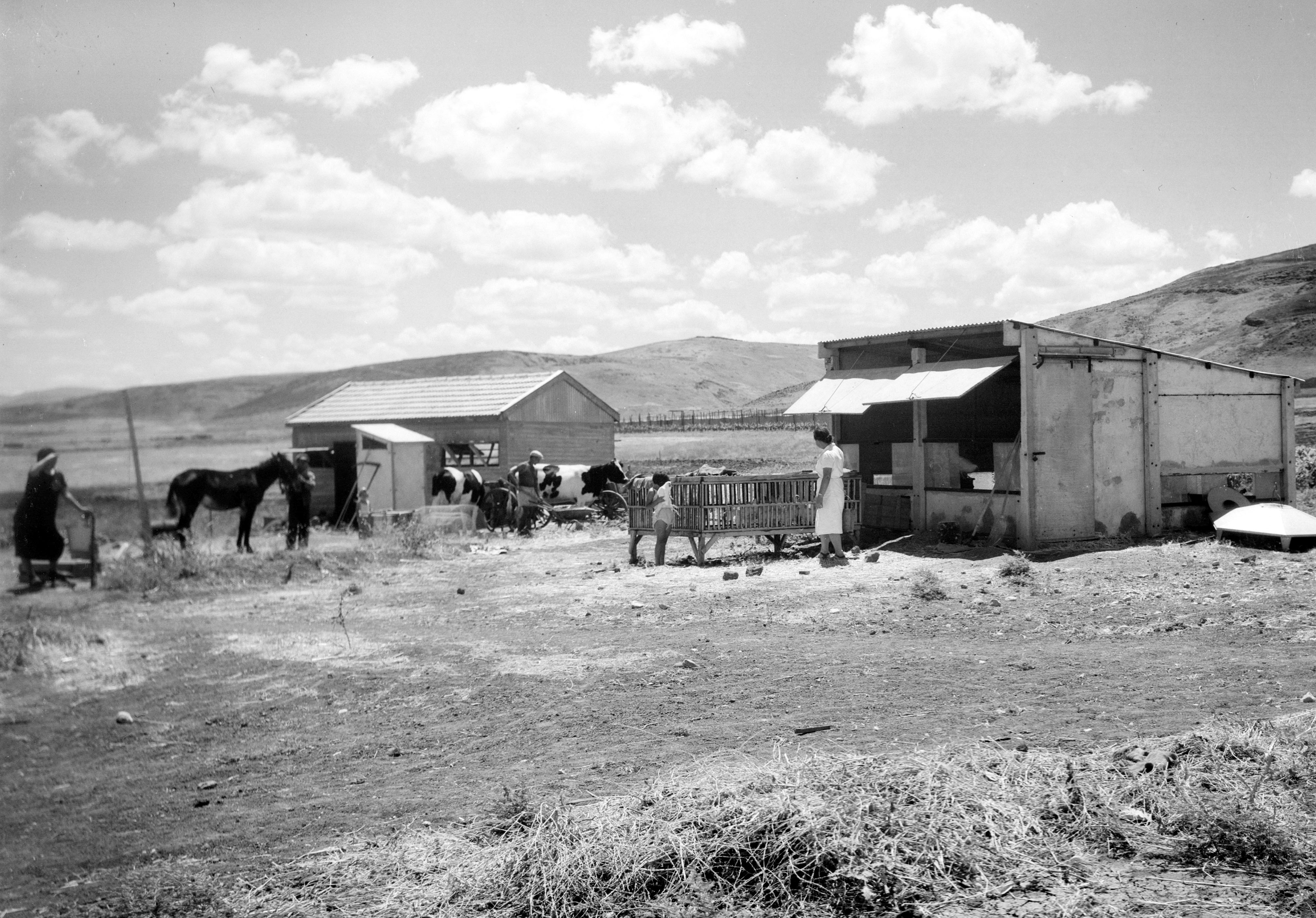
Farm on Moshav Beit Yosef, 1939

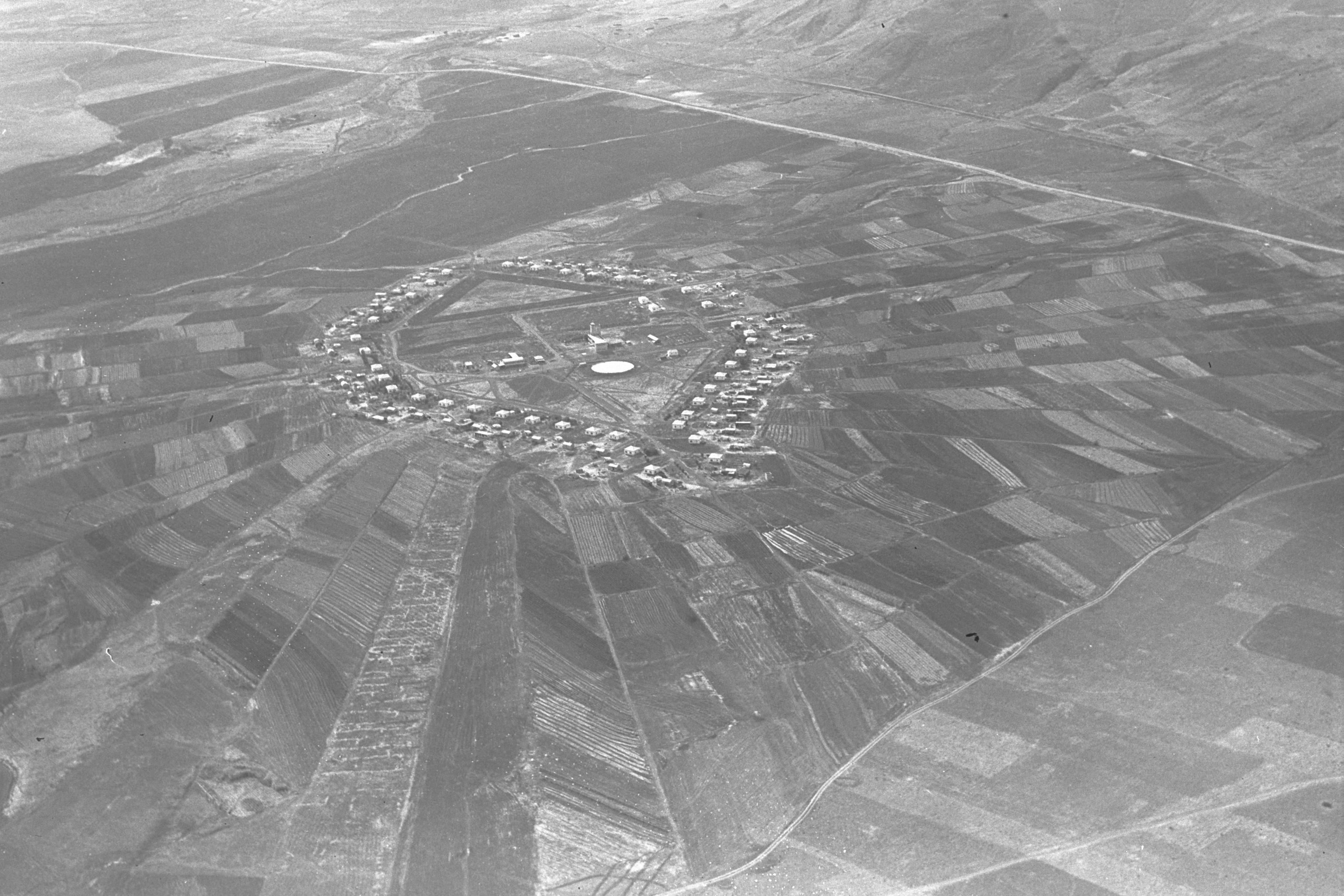
Beit Yosef 1946
