= Meital =

Community settlement in northern Israel

Meital: מיטל (Hebrew)
- Location within Jezreel Valley region of Israel
- Coordinates: 32.4390°N 35.4169°E
- Country: Israel
- District: Northern
- Subdistrict: Jezreel
- Council: Valley of Springs
- Population (2024): 227

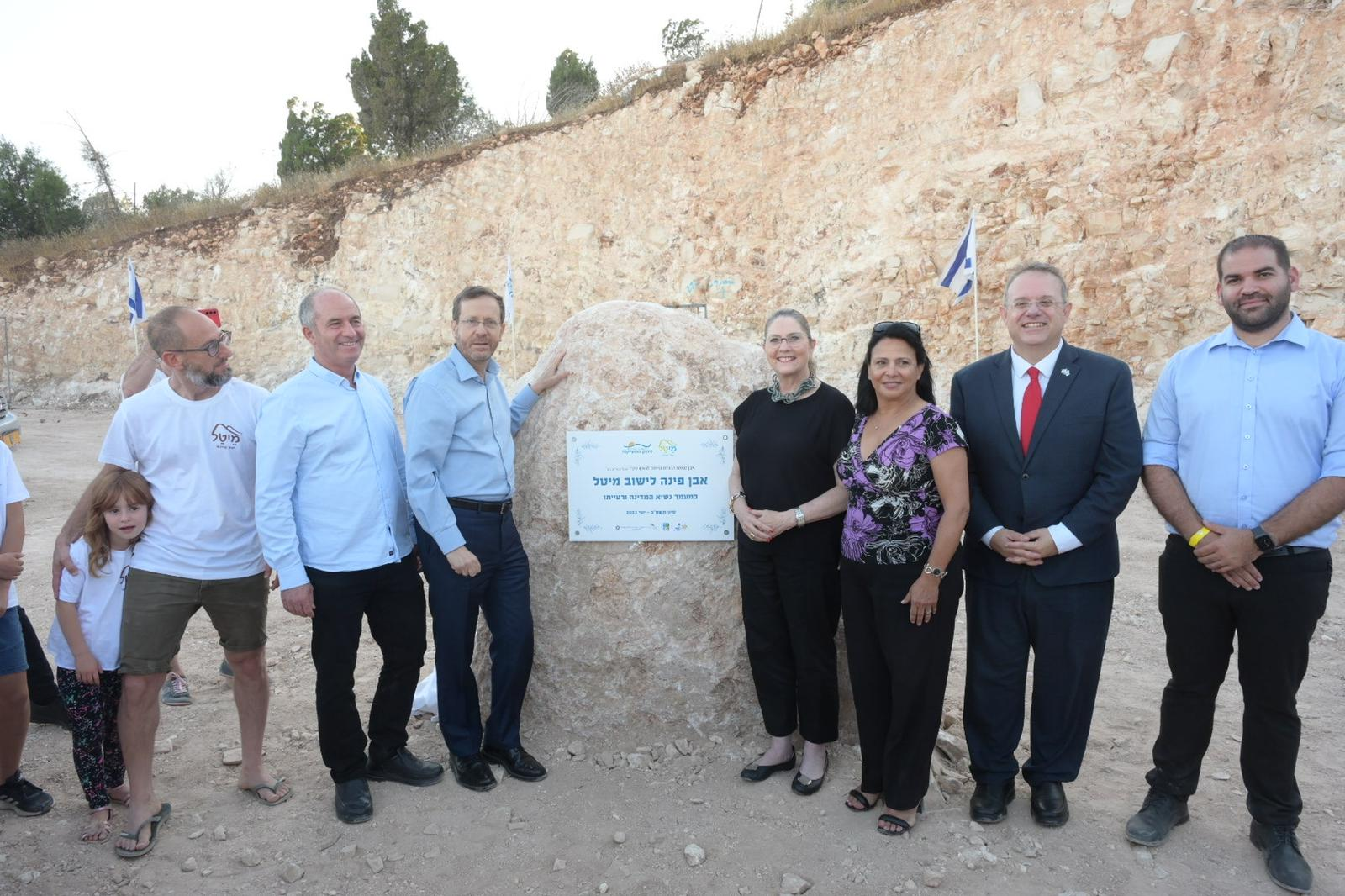
Cornerstone-laying ceremony for Meital, June 2022.

Meital (Hebrew: מיטל) is a community settlement in the Beit She'an valley in northern Israel. Located on Mount Gilboa adjacent to Malkishua, it falls under the jurisdiction of Valley of Springs Regional Council. In 2024 it had a population of 227.

== History ==
Planning of the village began in 2015.
