= Tel Rehov =

Archaeological site in Israel

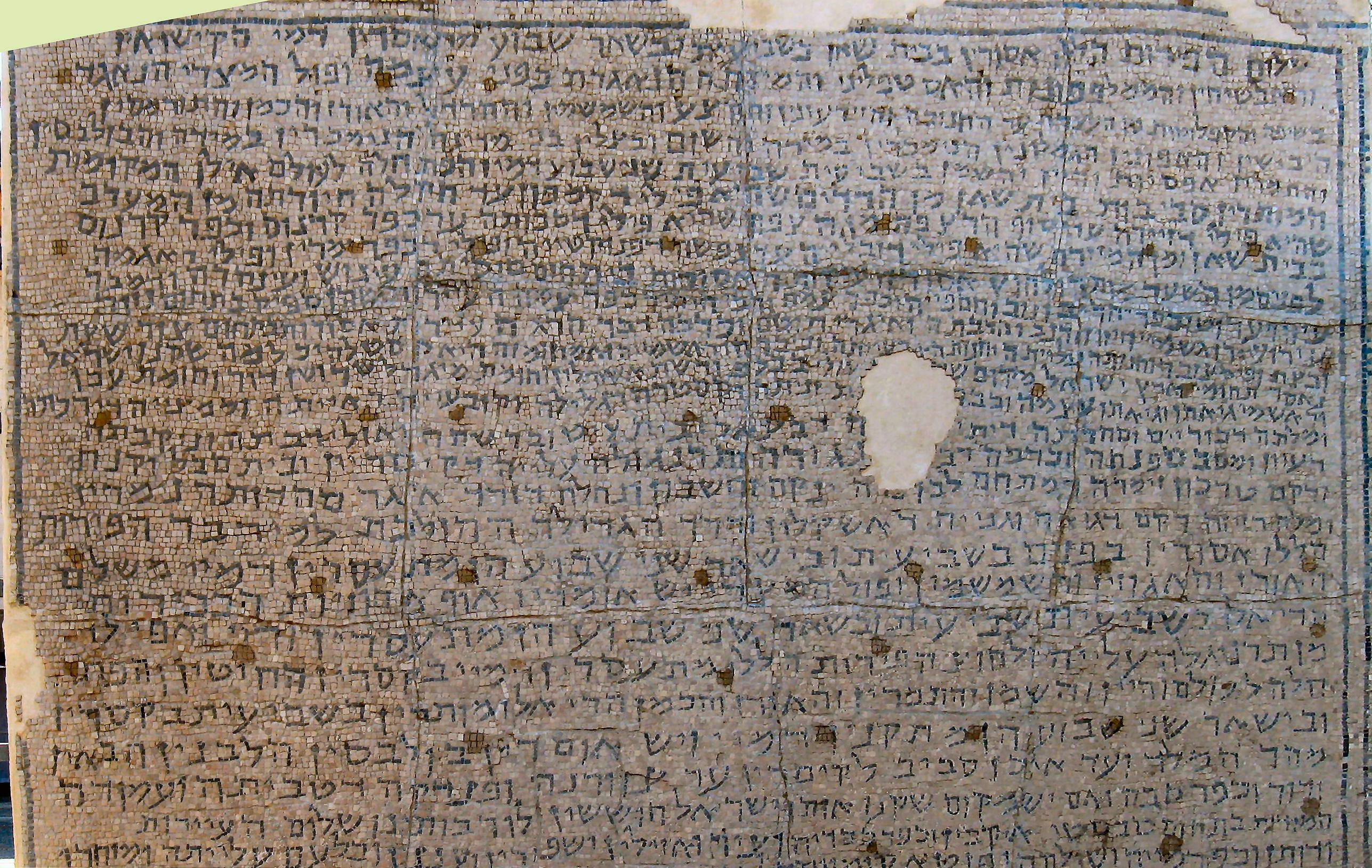
- "Mosaic of Rehob" from the synagogue at Khirbet Farwana/Horvat Parva near Tel Rehov

- Location within Israel
- 32.457125°N 35.498242°E
- Periods: Bronze Age, Iron Age
- Cultures: Canaanite, Israelite
- Region: Bet She'an Valley, Jezreel Subdistrict \ נפת יזרעאל, Northern District / מָחוֹז הַצָּפוֹן

History
- Built: circa 14th century BC
- Abandoned: 732 BCE (Assyrian destruction)

Site notes
- Material: largely mud brick, stone foundations
- Height: 34 m (max. present prominence)
- Excavation dates: 1997 to 2012
- Archaeologists: Amihai Mazar
- Website: https://telrehov.wordpress.com/telrehov/

Tel Rehov (Tel Reḥov) (Hebrew: תל רחוב) or Tell es-Sarem (Tell eṣ-Ṣarem) (Arabic: تل الصارم) is a large archaeological site situated in the Bet She'an Valley, a segment of the Jordan Valley, Israel. The site is located approximately 5 kilometres (3 mi) south of Beit She'an and 3 kilometres (2 mi) west of the Jordan River at an altitude between 160 metres (525 ft) and 126 metres (413 ft) Below Sea Level. Archaeological and historical evidences indicates that Tel Rehov was occupied in the Bronze Age and Iron Age.

The site is one of several suggested as Rehov (also Rehob), meaning "broad", "wide place".

The oldest apiary discovered anywhere by archaeologists, including man-made beehives and remains of the bees themselves, dating between the mid-10th century BCE and the early 9th century BCE, came to light on the tell. In the nearby ruins of the mainly Byzantine-period successor of Iron Age Rehov, a Jewish town named Rohob or Roōb, within it a synagogue with the Mosaic of Rehob, considered one of the most important discoveries from the Roman - Byzantine period and the longest mosaic inscription found so far in the Land of Israel.

== Identification ==
Tel Rehov does not correspond to the Hebrew Bible places named as Rehov, of which two were in the more westerly allotment of the Tribe of Asher, and one more northerly.

Identification of Tell es-Sarem/Tel Rehov with the ancient Canaanite and Israelite city of Rehov was based on the preservation of the name at the nearby Islamic holy tomb of esh-Sheikh er-Rihab (one kilometre; 1000 yards to the south of Tel Rehov), and the existence of the ruins of a Byzantine-period Jewish town that preserved the old name in the form of Rohob or Roōb/Roob (one kilometre; 1000 yards northwest of Tel Rehov).

Rehov was one of the largest cities in the region during the Late Bronze Age (1550–1200 BCE) and Iron Age I–IIA (1200–900 BCE). During the Late Bronze Age, while Egypt ruled over Canaan, Rehov was mentioned in at least three sources dated between the 15th–13th century BCE, and again in the list of conquests of Pharaoh Shoshenq I, whose campaign took place around 925 BCE.

== History ==
=== Early Bronze Age ===
Excavations revealed an eight meter wide mud brick fortification wall (with glacis) around the upper mound which the excavators attributed to the Early Bronze III period though no city of that period was found.

=== Late Bronze Age ===
The site was clearly occupied during the Late Bronze I and Late Bronze II periods (15th century-13th century BCE). Actual occupation from this period was only excavated in a small area (Area D) of the lower mound, with possible exposure in probes on the upper mound, owing to the large Iron Age stratigraphic overburden. Some Egyptian material, including a scarab with the inscription "Scribe of (the) house of (the) overseer of sealed items, Amenemhat" indicates the town may have been under Egyptian control like other towns in the region, after the time of Thutmose III.

=== Iron Age ===
The site was occupied in the Iron Age I and Iron Age II periods, from 12 century BC to 9th century BC. At that point it was destroyed and burnt which the excavators ascribe to the Assyrians in the mid-800s BC. During the Iron Age II, it was a city in the northern Kingdom of Israel. It had an estimated population of 2,000 during the 9th and 8th centuries BCE, according to archaeologist William G. Dever.

In the Levant there is a large Iron Age chronology controversy (similar the even more complicated Chronology of the ancient Near East with which there is some overlap). It is all very tangled with a High Chronology and a Low Chronology and some variants thereof. Given the careful stratigraphy and many radiocarbon dates Tel Rehov has been used to support and deny various chronologies. It has also been identified as a Lowland power center in opposition to the Omrides.

==== Greek pottery ====
From the 10th century BC and 9th century BC (Strata VI to IV) Greek pottery was found in stratified context. This is a useful result in addressing the chronology problems of the Levant (High vs Low) and of Greek pottery.

==== "Elisha" ostracon ====
In 2013, a potsherd was found holding a partially preserved inscription, which has been reconstructed as to be the rare name of Elisha, best known as the name of biblical Prophet Elisha. The association with the prophet is tenuous, based on the date of the ostracon (the second half of the ninth century), the rarity of the name, and the geographic vicinity of Elisha's biblical hometown, Abel-meholah; but the name reconstruction is disputed, and the presence of incense altars in the house of the find and throughout Tel Rehov is considered contrary to the teachings of biblical prophets.

==== Inscriptions ====
In and near Tel Rehov, inscriptions containing references to the family of Nimshi have been found. King Jehu of Israel, anointed by a disciple of Elisha, is the son, grandson, or otherwise descendant of a certain Nimshi.

==== Iron Age beehives ====
The oldest known archaeological finds relating to beekeeping were discovered at Rehov.

In September 2007, it was reported that 30 intact beehives and the remains of 100–200 more dated to the mid-10th century BCE to the early 9th century BCE were found (Strata V, Area C) by archaeologists in the ruins of Rehov. The hives had been destroyed by fire. The beehives were evidence of an advanced honey-producing beekeeping (apiculture) industry almost 3000 years ago in the city, thought to have had a population of about 2000 residents at that time, both Israelite and Canaanite. The beehives, made of straw and unbaked clay, were found in orderly rows of 100 hives each. Each individual beehive was shaped as a hollow cylinder measuring ca. 80 cm in length and 40 cm in diameter, with ca. 4 cm. thick walls. One end of the cylinder was sealed, with only a small hole in its center that allowed the bees to enter and exit the hive. Previously, references to honey in ancient texts of the region (such as the phrase "land of milk and honey" in the Hebrew Bible) were thought to refer only to "honey" produced from dates and figs; the discoveries show evidence of commercial production of bee honey and beeswax.

In addition to beehives, the remains of bees and bee larvae and pupae were also found. In 2010, using DNA from the remains of bees found at the site, researchers identified the bees as a subspecies, similar to the Anatolian bee, found now only in Turkey. It is possible that the bees' range has changed, but more likely that the inhabitants of Tel Rehov imported bees because they were less aggressive than the local bees and provided a better honey yield (three to eight times higher than Israel's native bees).

Supporting archaeological knowledge include evidence of other imports in Rehov from eastern Mediterranean lands; later Egyptian documentation of transferring bees in large pottery vases or portable beehives; and an Assyrian stele from the 8th century BCE that evidences that bees had been brought from the Taurus Mountains of southern Turkey to the land of Suhu—about the same distance as between the Taurus and Rehov (400 kilometres (250 mi)).

The beehives were dated by carbon-14 radiocarbon dating at the University of Groningen in the Netherlands, using organic material (wheat found next to the beehives).

Ezra Marcus of the University of Haifa, said the finding was a glimpse of ancient beekeeping seen in Near Eastern texts and ancient art. Religious practice was evidenced by an altar decorated with fertility figurines found alongside the hives.

== Archaeology ==
The site of Tel Rehov consists of an upper and lower mound with a total area, including mound slopes, of 11 hectares (27 acres). The total area of the mound tops is 7 hectares (17 acres).

The site was inspected by W.F. Albright in the 1920s, identifying the main occupation period as being the 13th to 10th century BC. In the 1940s Avraham Bergman and Ruth Brandstater inspected Tel Rehov. While there they found a Proto-Canaanite inscription in the topsoil. In the following decades some local residents collected items from the site, including a cylinder seal from the Old Babylonian period.

After full surface surveys and a geophysical study of the lower mound in 1995–1996 modern archaeological excavations were conducted for 11 seasons between 1997 and 2012 under the directorship of Amihai Mazar, Professor at the Institute of Archaeology of the Hebrew University in Jerusalem, and with the primary sponsorship of writer John Camp. Seven occupation strata were established with the uppermost (Strata I) representing scattered Islamic finds and the rest (Strata II to VII) being Iron Age. The lower mound was abandoned after Strata IV. No strata were established for the Bronze Age as results in this period were scanty and primarily on a small part of the lower mound. Among the finds, recovered in the 2003 season, was a 10th century BC jar with 2 identical three letter Proto-Canaanite inscriptions.

In 2002 a small rescue excavation occurred after ditching damaged several Bronze Age shaft tombs on the fringes of the site. Besides human remains, pottery fragments, ostrich egg-shell fragments, and two complete bronze daggers were found.

== Nearby sites ==
=== Ancient synagogue ===
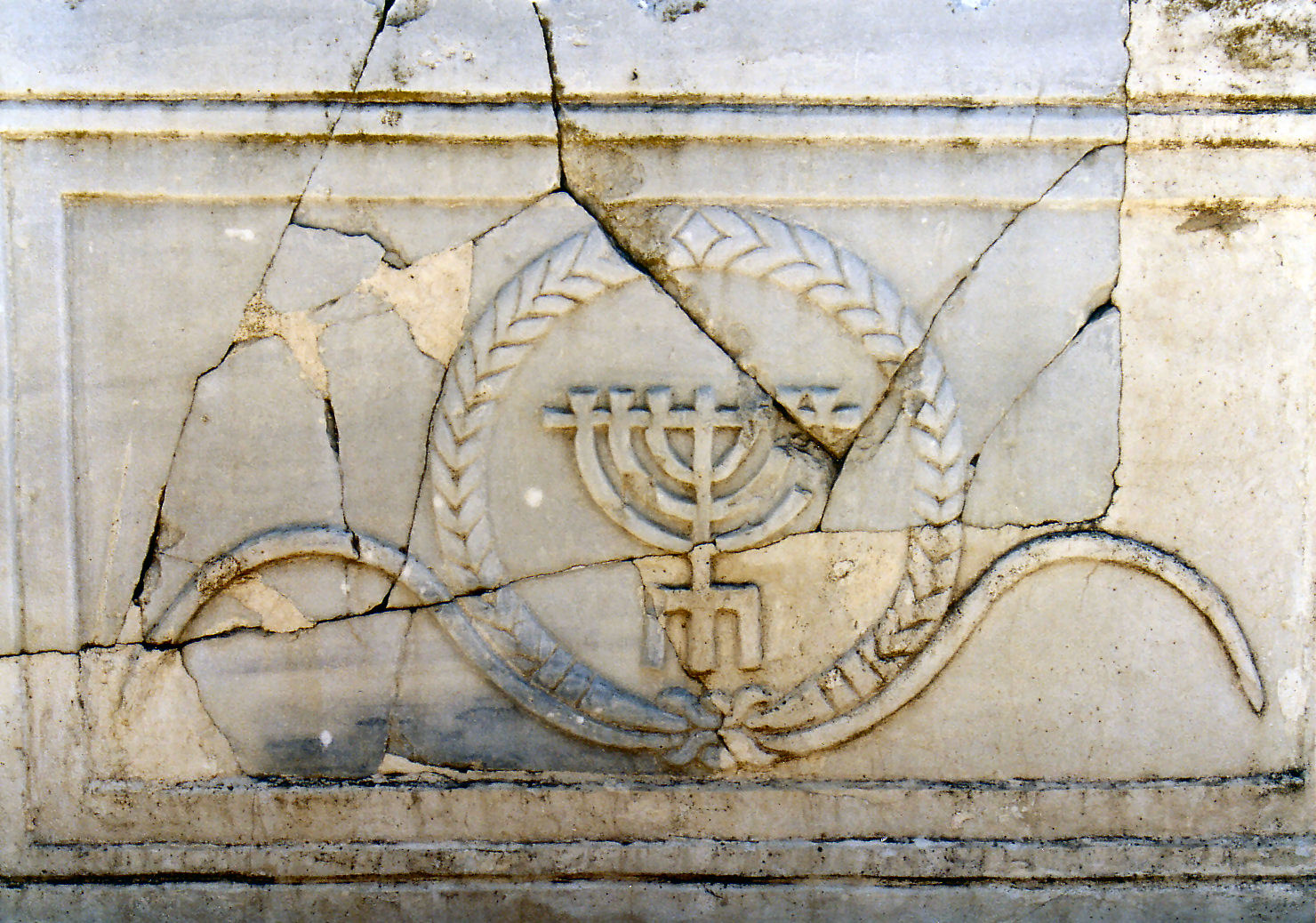
Tel Rehov ancient synagogue: marble screen with menorah relief

Remains of a mainly Byzantine-period synagogue built in three successive phases between the fourth and the seventh century CE were found at the site of Tulul Farwana ("mounds of Farwana"), now part of the agricultural lands of Kibbutz Ein HaNetziv. Among the remains of the synagogue archaeologists found a relatively well-preserved mosaic pavement, the narthex part of which includes a very long sixth-century inscription in Aramaic; the so-called Mosaic of Rehob, Tel Rehov inscription or Baraita of the Boundaries with details of Jewish religious laws concerning "the Borders of the Land of Israel" (Baraitha di-Tehumin), tithes and the Sabbatical Year. During an archaeological survey of the abandoned structures standing at Farwana, there was found a marble-parapet with a relief of a seven-branched menorah, believed to have once enclosed the raised rostrum of the synagogue. Today, the marble-parapet with its menorah relief is on display at the synagogue in Kibbutz Ein HaNetziv. Later, children from the kibbutz discovered nearby one of the abandoned structures a cache of gold coins, which discovery prompted a more thorough investigation of the site, under the tutelage of archaeologist Fanny Vitto. An excavation of the site by her team led to the discovery of the aforementioned mosaic.

=== Byzantine era town ===
During the Byzantine era, a Jewish town that preserved the old name in the form of Rohob or Roob, stood one kilometre (1000 yards) northwest of Tel Rehov, at Khirbet Farwana/Horbat Parva and was mentioned by Eusebius as being on the fourth mile from Scythopolis, modern-day Beit She'an/Bisan.

Archaeological work at Farwana has also exposed pottery and other finds from the Iron Age, the Persian, Hellenistic, Roman, Byzantine, Early Islamic, Crusader, Mamluk and Ottoman periods.

== Publication ==
With the conclusion of the first campaign of excavations at the site of Tel Rehov after 2012, the efforts of the excavation team were directed towards a comprehensive and efficient publication of the findings. These were published in the Qedem publication series of the Hebrew University in five successive volumes:

- A. Mazar and N. Panitz-Cohen. 2020. Tel Reḥov, A Bronze and Iron Age City in the Beth-Shean Valley Volume I. Introductions, Synthesis and Excavations on the Upper Mound

== Exhibition ==
In 2016, almost four years after the conclusion of the Hebrew University excavations at Tel Rehov, a large selection of the excavated finds were exhibited in the Migdal Gallery of the Eretz Israel Museum in Tel Aviv from 1 January until 31 October.

== See also ==
- Ancient synagogues in the Palestine region - covers entire Palestine region/Land of Israel
  - Ancient synagogues in Israel - covers the modern State of Israel
- Archaeology of Israel
- Cities of the ancient Near East
