= Khirbat al-Jawfa =

Palestinian village, depopulated in 1948

Khirbat al-Jawfa Khirbet al Jaufa
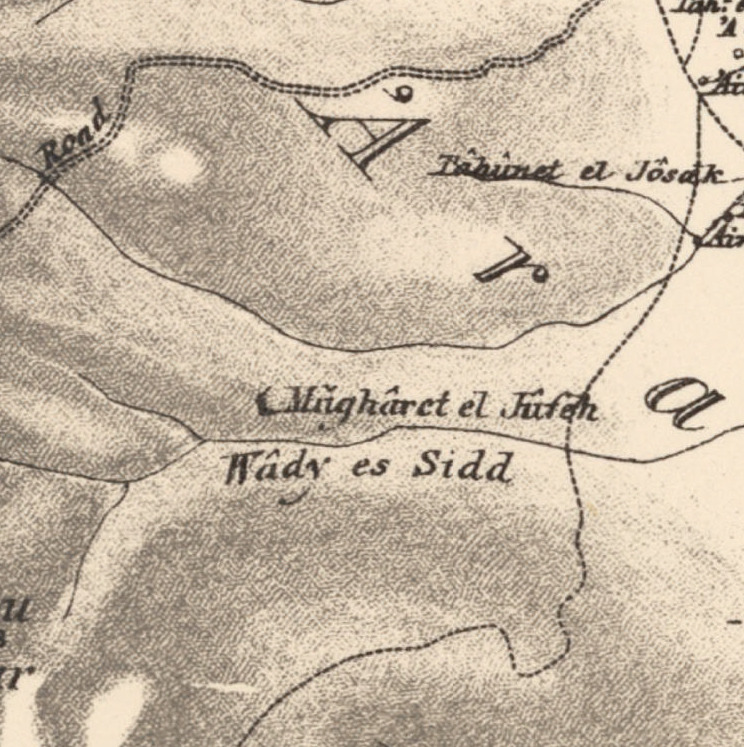
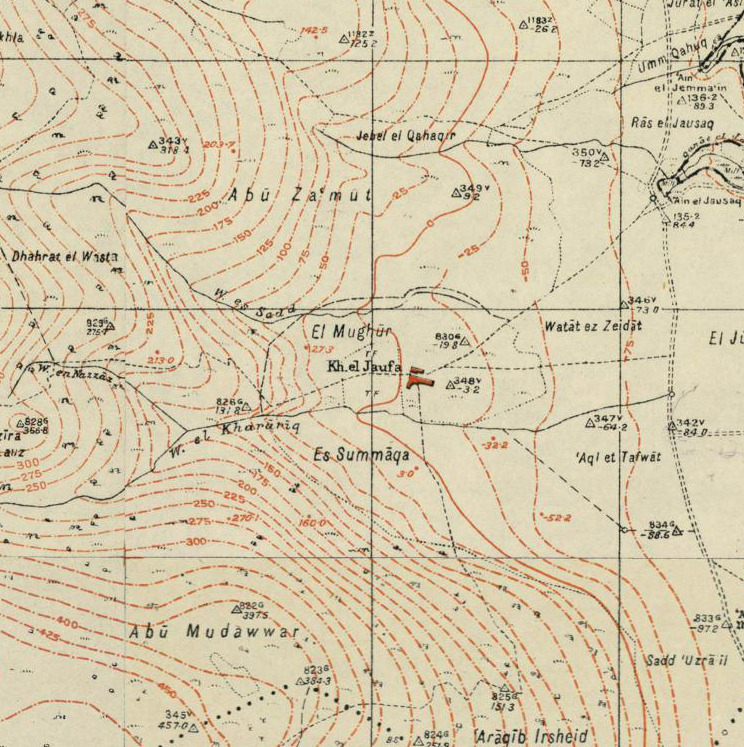
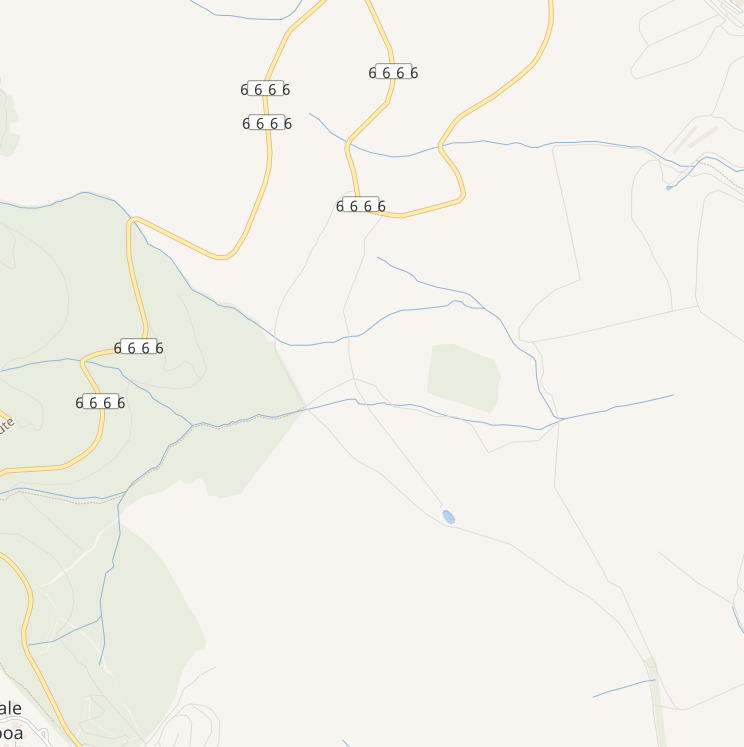
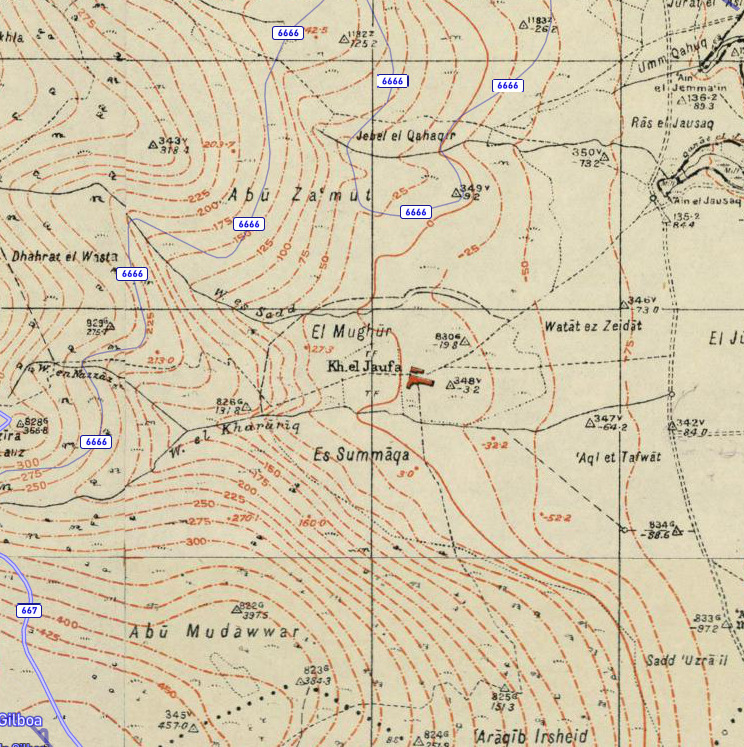
- 1870s map 1940s map modern map 1940s with modern overlay map A series of historical maps of the area around Khirbat al-Jawfa (click the buttons)

- Location within Mandatory Palestine
- Coordinates: 32°29′26″N 35°26′01″E
- Palestine grid: 191/210
- Geopolitical entity: Mandatory Palestine
- Subdistrict: Jenin
- Date of depopulation: 12 May 1948
- Cause(s) of depopulation: Influence of nearby town's fall
- Current Localities: Ma'ale Gilboa

Khirbat al-Jawfa' was a Palestinian Arab village that was depopulated during the 1948 Arab–Israeli war.

== Location ==
The village was situated 12 kilometers (7.5 mi) east of Jenin, on the top of a small circular plateau that extended from the northern slope of a mountain (Jabal Faqqu'a). It overlooked the Jordan Valley to the north and northeast, and was linked by a dirt path to the village Tall al-Shawk in District of Baysan.

== History ==
=== British period ===
In the British mandate period the village was classified as a hamlet by the Palestine Index Gazetteer.

It was probably occupied by the forces of the Golani Brigade as part of Operation Gideon on 12 May 1948. Most of its population fled to Jenin and its surrounding areas after the Israeli forces overtook the city of Bisan on 15 May 1948.

=== Israeli period ===
According to the Palestinian historian Walid Khalidi, the 1948 armistice line separating Israel from the West Bank fell a short distance to the west of Khirbat al-Jawfa, cutting through the land of the nearby village of Faqqu'a (in the West Bank). The land of this village that was inside Israel have been combined with the land that belonged to Khirbat al-Jawfa, making the two indistinguishable. The kibbutz of Ma'ale Gilboa, founded 1962, is located inside this amalgamated parcel of land, southwest of the village site.

Khalidi described the village remaining structures in 1992 as: "Although sections of some walls still stand, most of the former houses have been reduced to rubble. The entire area has been fenced in and is used as a grazing area for cows. A large water tank belonging to kibbutz Ma'ale Gilbo'a is on the site".

== See also ==
- Depopulated Palestinian locations in Israel

== Bibliography ==
- Khalidi, W. (1992). All That Remains:The Palestinian Villages Occupied and Depopulated by Israel in 1948. Washington D.C.: Institute for Palestine Studies. ISBN 0-88728-224-5.
- Morris, B. (2004). The Birth of the Palestinian Refugee Problem Revisited. Cambridge University Press. ISBN 978-0-521-00967-6.

== External links and references ==
- Welcome to al-Jawfa,-Khirbat
- Khirbat al-Jawfa at Zochrot
- Survey of Western Palestine, Map 9: IAA, Wikimedia commons
- Al-Jawfa, Khirbat at Khalil Sakakini Cultural Center
