= Rehov =

Moshav in north eastern Israel

Rehov: רחוב (Hebrew)
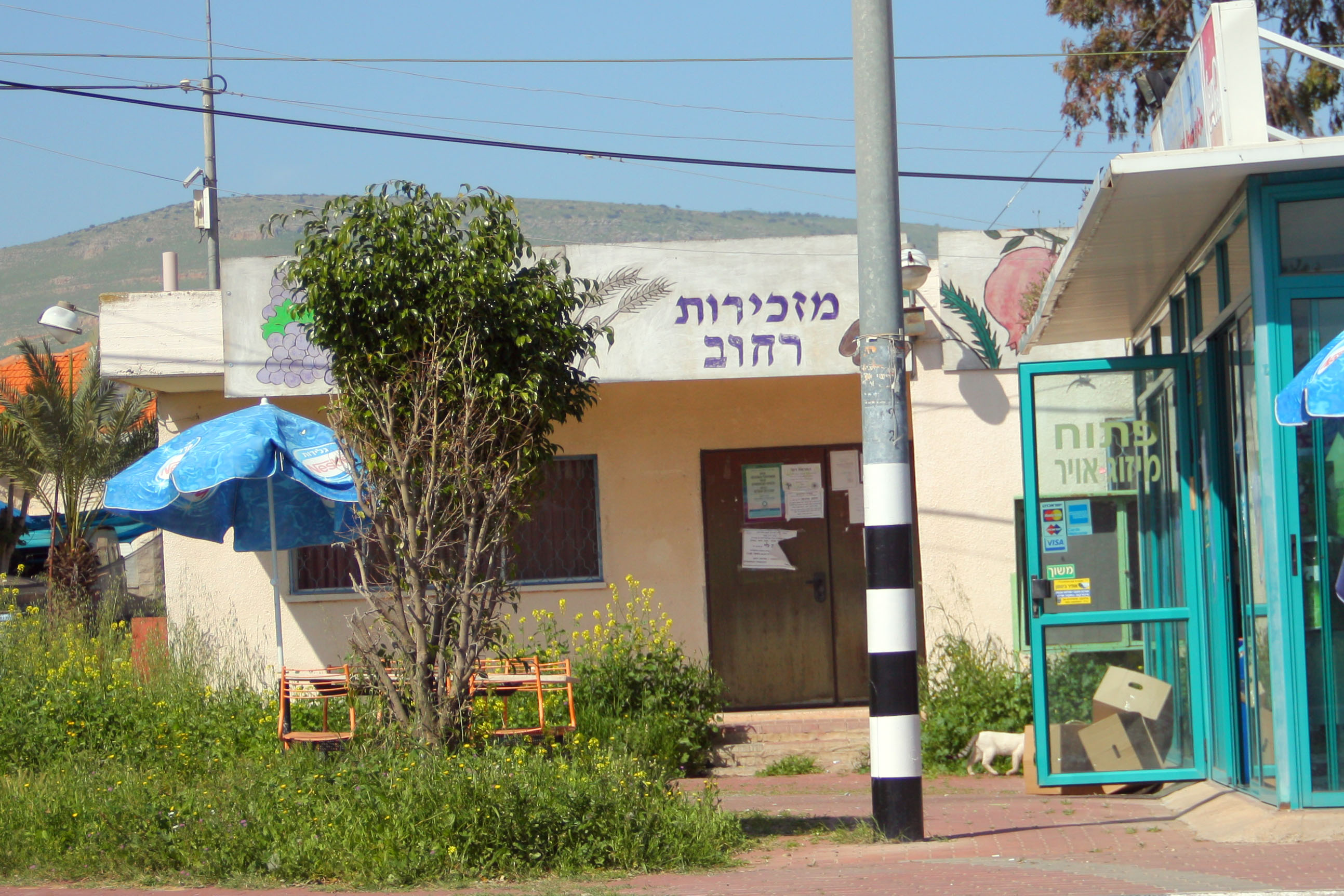

- Location within Jezreel Valley region of Israel Location within Israel
- Coordinates: 32°27′03″N 35°29′23″E
- Country: Israel
- District: Northern
- Subdistrict: Jezreel
- Council: Valley of Springs
- Affiliation: Hapoel HaMizrachi
- Founded: 1951
- Founder: Kurdish and Moroccan immigrants
- Population (2024): 612

Rehov (Hebrew: רחוב) is a moshav in northern Israel. Located four kilometres south of Beit She'an, it falls under the jurisdiction of the Valley of Springs Regional Council. In 2024, it had a population of 612.

== History ==
The moshav was established in 1951 by immigrants from Kurdistan and Morocco and named for the Jewish ancient city of Tel Rehov, which was located in the area.
