= Sde Eliyahu =

Religious kibbutz in northern Israel

Sde Eliyahu: שְׂדֵה אֵלִיָּהוּ (Hebrew)
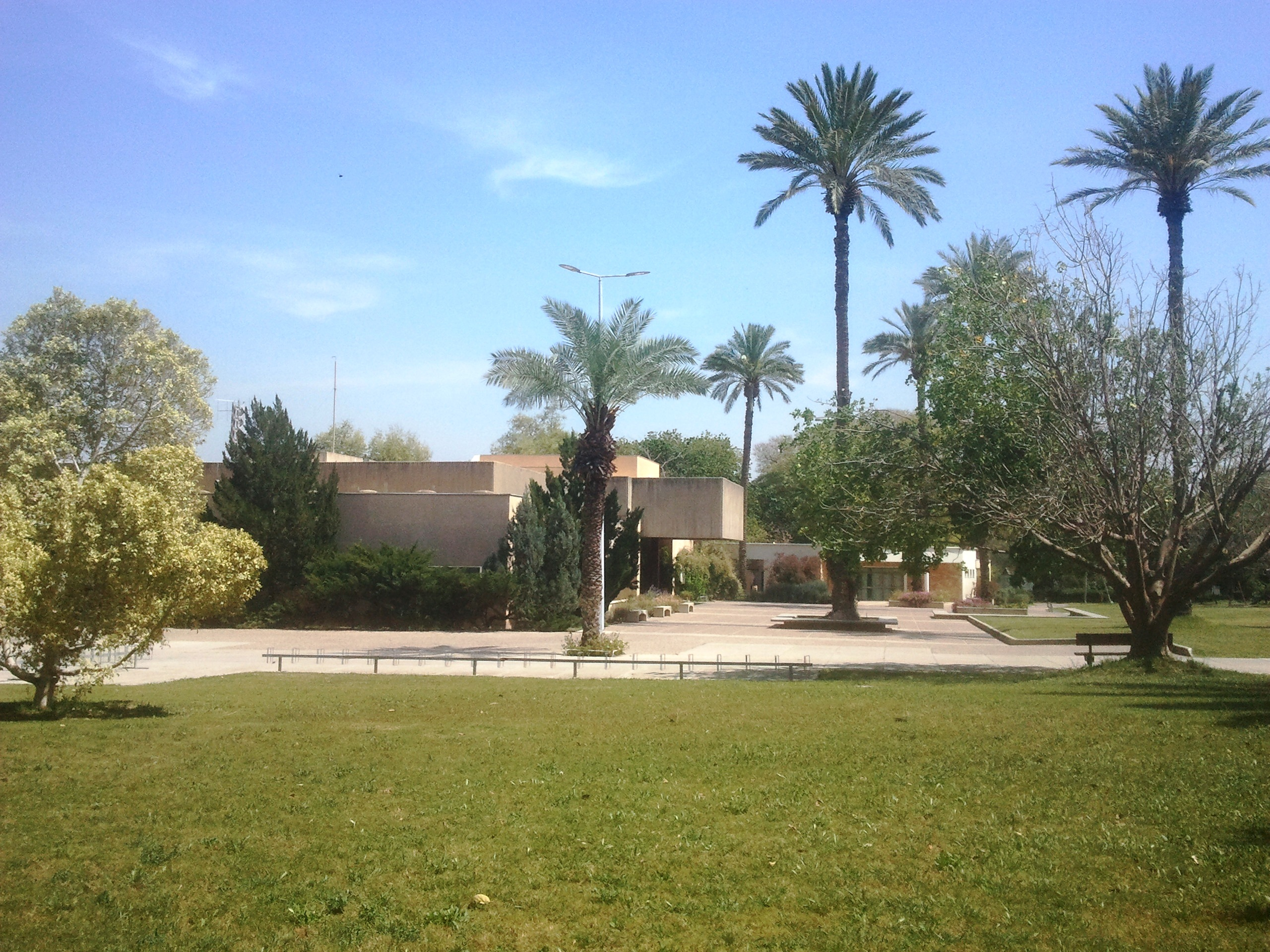

- Location within Jezreel Valley region of Israel
- Coordinates: 32°26′25″N 35°30′54″E
- Country: Israel
- District: Northern
- Subdistrict: Jezreel
- Council: Valley of Springs
- Affiliation: Religious Kibbutz Movement
- Founded: 8 May 1939
- Founder: German Jewish refugees
- Population (2024): 795
- Website: www.seliyahu.org.il

Sde Eliyahu (Hebrew: שְׂדֵה אֵלִיָּהוּ, lit. Eliyahu Field) is a religious kibbutz in northern Israel. Located five kilometres south of Beit She'an, it falls under the jurisdiction of Valley of Springs Regional Council. In 2024 it had a population of 795.

== History ==
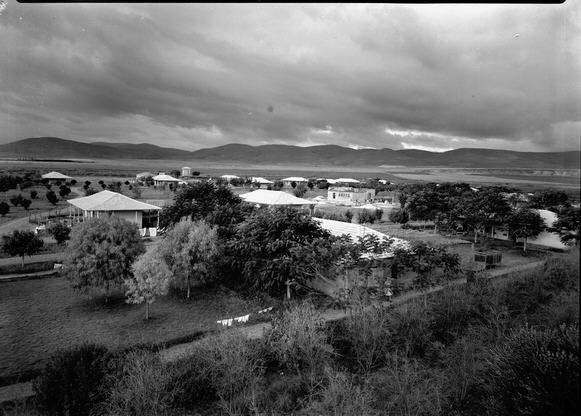
Sde Eliyahu 1946

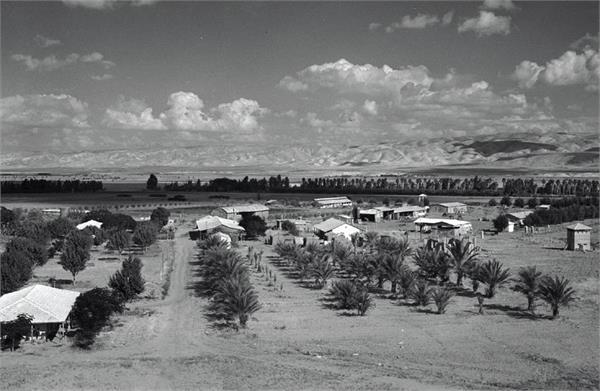
Sde Eliyahu 1947

Sde Eliyahu was founded on 8 May 1939 by Jewish refugees from Nazi Germany as a tower and stockade settlement. It was named after the 19th-century Rabbi Eliyahu Guttmacher, one of the early leaders of Religious Zionism. It was part of a cluster of religious kibbutzim that includes Ein HaNatziv, Shluhot and Tirat Zvi.

The population of the kibbutz grew from 60 in 1937 to 208 by 1948.

After the 1948 Arab–Israeli War, Sde Eliyahu began to farm the land the depopulated Palestinian village of Arab al-'Arida.

== Economy ==
The kibbutz produces dates, olives, grapes, pomegranates, spices and field crops, as well as dairy cattle and poultry. Organic farming methods and non-pesticide management are used.

BioBee was established in 1983 as the Sde Eliyahu Biological Control Insectaries. The company mass-breeds and sells insects that are natural enemies of pests, sterile males of the Mediterranean fruit fly for pest control using the sterile insect technique, and bumblebees for pollination in greenhouses and open farmfields. In 2021, BioBee's use of persimilis, a predatory mite, to replace chemical pesticides, won the Bernard Blum Award from the International Biocontrol Manufacturers Association in Basel, which named it the leading biocontrol solution of the year.

== Education ==
"Shaked" is a regional religious school located on the kibbutz. The kibbutz also operates a beit midrash, an ulpan and a volunteer program; Students work three days a week and study three days a week, and are provided with their own dormitories, break room, and living area.

== Climate ==
Climate data for Sde Eliyahu (1991–2020)
Month	Jan	Feb	Mar	Apr	May	Jun	Jul	Aug	Sep	Oct	Nov	Dec	Year
Record high °C (°F)	25.2 (77.4)	31.2 (88.2)	37.6 (99.7)	43.5 (110.3)	45.4 (113.7)	47.5 (117.5)	47.2 (117.0)	46.7 (116.1)	46.0 (114.8)	43.4 (110.1)	35.3 (95.5)	28.8 (83.8)	47.5 (117.5)
Mean daily maximum °C (°F)	18.4 (65.1)	19.9 (67.8)	24.0 (75.2)	29.0 (84.2)	33.7 (92.7)	36.5 (97.7)	38.2 (100.8)	38.3 (100.9)	36.6 (97.9)	32.9 (91.2)	26.1 (79.0)	20.3 (68.5)	29.5 (85.1)
Daily mean °C (°F)	13.1 (55.6)	14.0 (57.2)	17.1 (62.8)	21.2 (70.2)	25.4 (77.7)	28.4 (83.1)	30.6 (87.1)	31.1 (88.0)	29.3 (84.7)	25.9 (78.6)	19.9 (67.8)	14.9 (58.8)	22.6 (72.7)
Mean daily minimum °C (°F)	7.8 (46.0)	8.1 (46.6)	10.2 (50.4)	13.3 (55.9)	17.1 (62.8)	20.2 (68.4)	22.9 (73.2)	23.8 (74.8)	21.9 (71.4)	18.9 (66.0)	13.7 (56.7)	9.5 (49.1)	15.6 (60.1)
Record low °C (°F)	−3.0 (26.6)	−0.6 (30.9)	1.9 (35.4)	−0.3 (31.5)	9.2 (48.6)	13.1 (55.6)	17.6 (63.7)	18.5 (65.3)	13.2 (55.8)	10.8 (51.4)	1.9 (35.4)	0.2 (32.4)	−3.0 (26.6)
Average precipitation mm (inches)	68.7 (2.70)	57.2 (2.25)	30.6 (1.20)	13.3 (0.52)	5.5 (0.22)	0.0 (0.0)	0.0 (0.0)	0.0 (0.0)	0.3 (0.01)	12.8 (0.50)	31.3 (1.23)	61.4 (2.42)	281.1 (11.07)
Average precipitation days (≥ 1.0 mm)	8.6	7.4	4.5	2.1	0.9	0.0	0.0	0.0	0.1	1.9	4.1	6.7	36.3
Source: NOAA

== Notable people ==
- Moshe Unna, former member of the Knesset
