= Emek HaMaayanot Regional Council =

Regional council in northern Israel

Coordinates: 32°29′39.25″N 35°31′11.77″E

Emek HaMa'ayanot עמק המעיינות
- Regional council
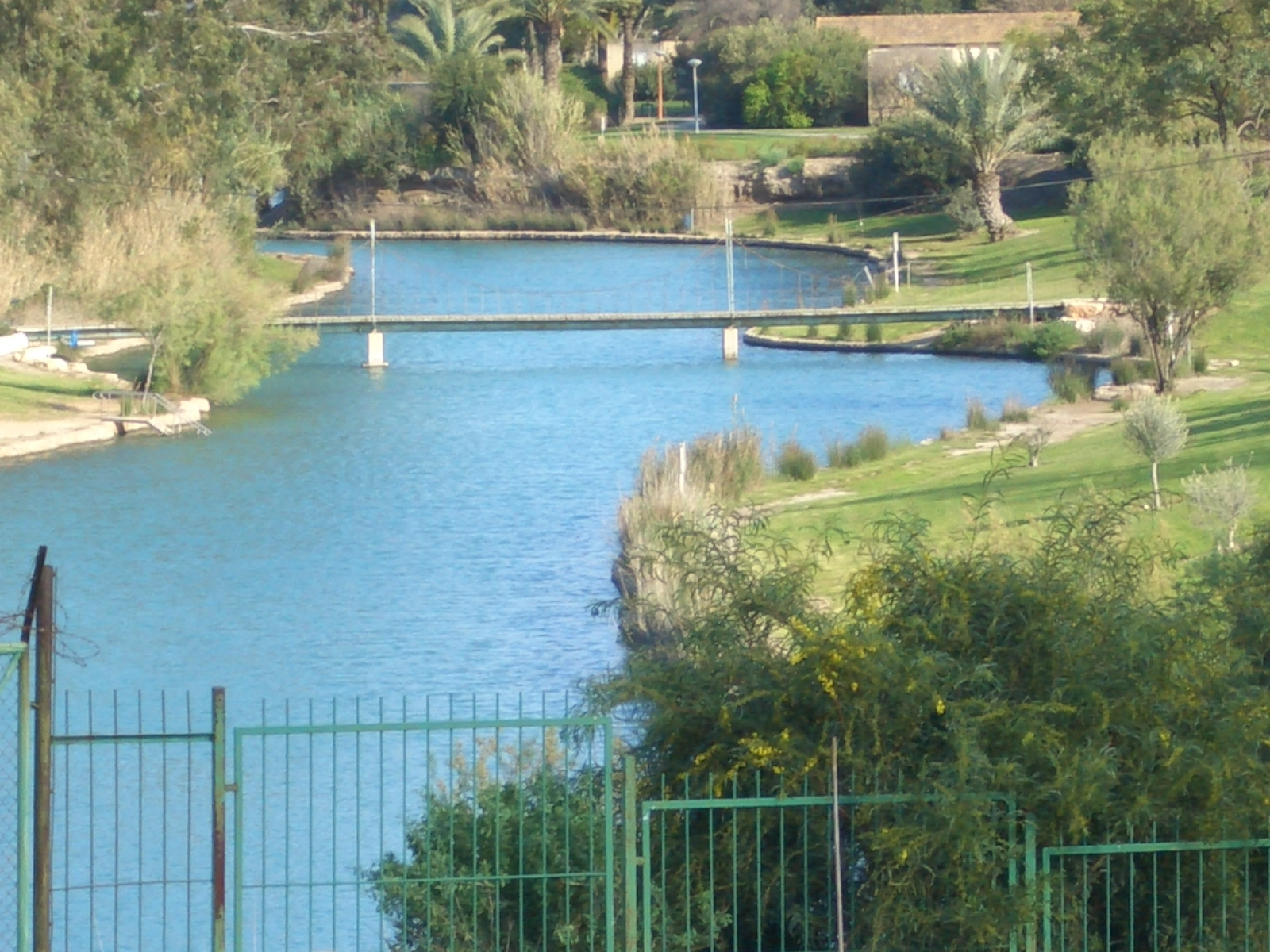
- One of the springs in Emek HaMa'ayanot
- Interactive map of Emek HaMa'ayanot
- Country: Israel
- District: Northern
- Subdistrict: Jezreel
- Natural region: Beit She'an Valley

Government
  - Head of Municipality: Itamar Matiash

Area
  - Total: 245,300 dunams (245.3 km^{2}; 94.7 sq mi)

Population (2024)
  - Total: 16,628
  - Density: 67.79/km^{2} (175.6/sq mi)
- Website: www.maianot.co.il

Council emblem until 2008

Emek HaMa'ayanot Regional Council (Hebrew: מועצה אזורית עמק המעיינות, Mo'atza Azorit Emek HaMa'ayanot, lit. Valley of the Springs Regional Council) is a regional council in the Northern District of Israel that encompasses most of the settlements in the Beit She'an Valley. Until 2008 it was known as the Beit She'an Valley Regional Council (Mo'atza Azorit Bik'at Beit She'an).

== Physical geography ==
The territory of the regional council is bounded by the Jezreel Valley in the west, in the north by the Lower Galilee, to the east by the Jordan River, and the south by the Jordan Valley and Samarian hills.

== Population and administrative geography ==
About 16,000 people live in the sixteen kibbutzim, six moshavim, and 2 community villages located in its municipal territory. The city of Beit She'an lies in the centre of the territory, but is an independent municipality.

== List of settlements ==
=== Kibbutzim ===
- Ein HaNetziv
- Gesher
- Hamadia
- Kfar Ruppin
- Ma'ale Gilboa
- Maoz Haim
- Meirav
- Mesilot
- Neve Eitan
- Neve Ur
- Nir David
- Reshafim
- Sde Eliyahu
- Sde Nahum
- Shluhot
- Tirat Zvi

=== Moshavim ===
- Beit Yosef
- Rehov
- Revaya
- Sde Trumot
- Yardena

=== Other ===
- Malkishua (drug rehabilitation centre)
- Meital (community settlement)
- Menahemia (moshava)
- Tel Te'omim (community settlement)

== Demographics ==
Historical population
Year	Pop.	±%
1972	6,000	—
1983	7,300	+21.7%
1995	7,500	+2.7%
2008	10,800	+44.0%
2022	15,211	+40.8%
2024	16,628	+9.3%

== Voting Patterns ==
In the 2022 election, 51 percent of voters in the regional council voted for the parties of the center-left coalition led by Yair Lapid, while 49 percent voted for the parties of the right-wing coalition led by Benjamin Netanyahu and 0.2 percent voted for the Arab parties.

In the 2026 election, 48 percent of voters in the regional council voted for the parties of the center-left coalition led by Gadi Eisenkot, while 42 percent voted for the parties of the right-wing coalition led by Benjamin Netanyahu and 0.2 percent voted for the Arab parties. An additional 4.2 percent voted for the Reservists, and 5.7 percent voted for Amcha Yisrael. Voter turnout increased 18 percent from the 2022 election.

== See also ==
- Tourism in Israel
