= Malkishua =

Malkishua מלכישוע
- Rehabilitation village
- Location within Jezreel Valley region of Israel Location within Israel
- Coordinates: 32°26′19″N 35°24′48″E
- Country: Israel
- District: Northern
- Subdistrict: Jezreel
- Regional council: Valley of Springs
- Established: 1990

Government
  - CEO (operator): Uria Gan

Population (2021)
  - Total: 243
- Website: malkishua.org.il/en/

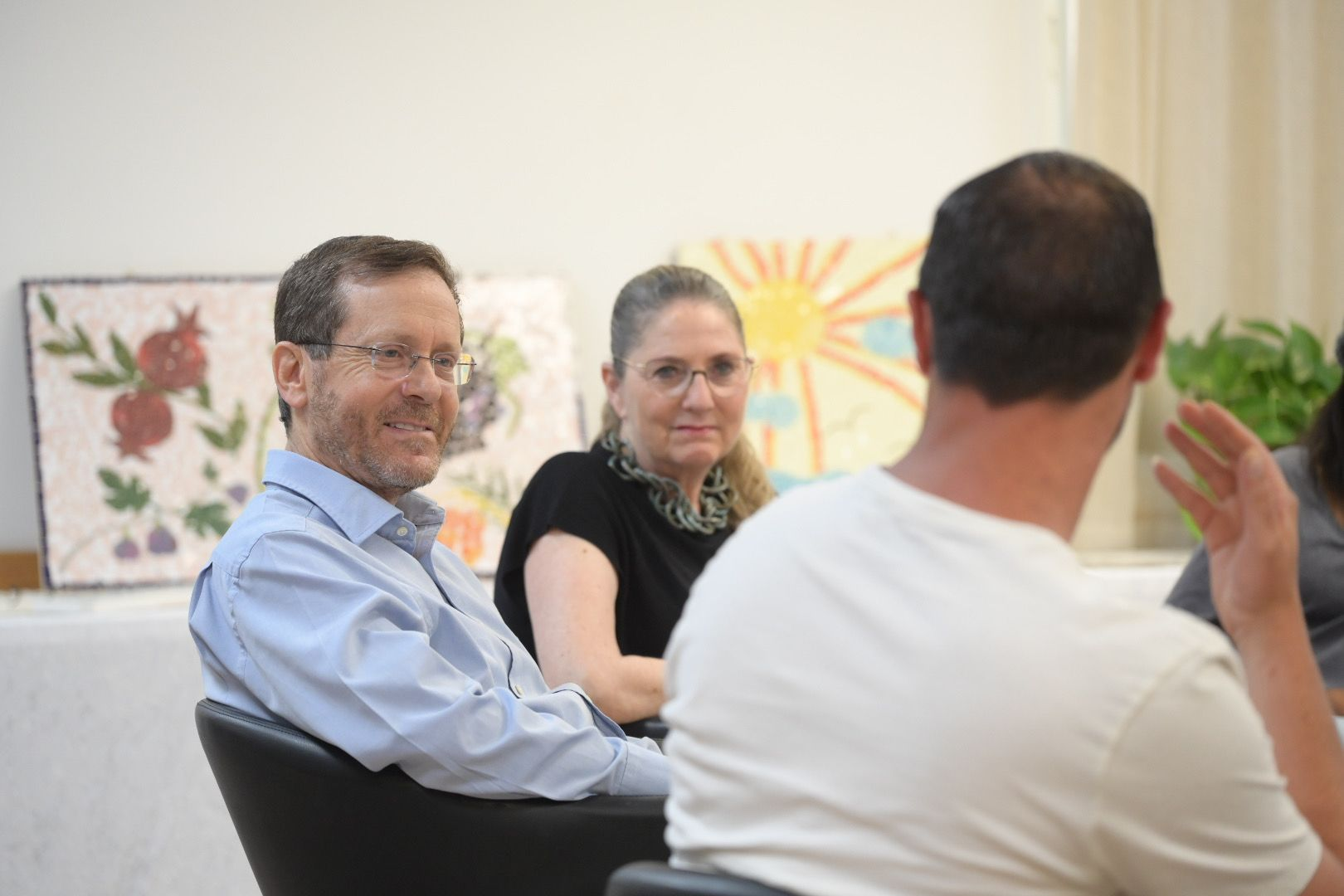
The President of Israel, Isaac Herzog, and his wife, Michal Herzog, visiting Neve Malkishua (June 2022).

Malkishua (Hebrew: מלכישוע) is an Israeli drug and alcohol rehabilitation village located on Mount Gilboa in north-eastern Israel. It is under the jurisdiction of the Valley of Springs Regional Council. In 2021 it had a population of 243.

The village is operated by the non-profit Neve Malkishua Association (Hebrew: עמותת נוה מלכישוע).

== History ==
Malkishua was established in 1990 on a joint initiative of Israel's national anti-drug authority (then commonly referred to in English as the National Authority for the War on Drugs and Alcohol) and the regional council. According to the organization's published history, in March 1991 the Neve Malkishua Association was registered and became the operating body of the village.

The name Malkishua refers to Malchishua, a son of Saul, who is described in the Bible as falling on Mount Gilboa (1 Samuel 31:2).

The youth treatment framework began operating in the mid-1990s. The village later expanded its services to additional populations and programs.

== Leadership ==
Uria Gan has been described as the chief executive officer (CEO) of the Neve Malkishua Association (operator of the village) in multiple public profiles and institutional publications.

== Treatment model and services ==
Malkishua provides residential rehabilitation services that are described by the operator as being based on the therapeutic community model, with separate frameworks for different age groups and needs. The organization describes services that include:

- Adult therapeutic community;
- Youth therapeutic community;
- Young-adult programs (e.g., "Afik");
- A detox/physical rehabilitation unit.

Malkishua is referenced in international drug policy reporting as a therapeutic community in Israel that reported admission profiles of young males in the early 2010s.

== Research and publications ==
Malkishua has been used as a setting or recruitment site in peer-reviewed research on substance use and rehabilitation, including studies describing participants from Malkishua in Israel.

Malkishua also appears as a location in registered clinical research listings involving substance use disorder interventions.
