= Yardena =

Moshav in northern Israel

Yardena: יַרְדֵּנָה (Hebrew)
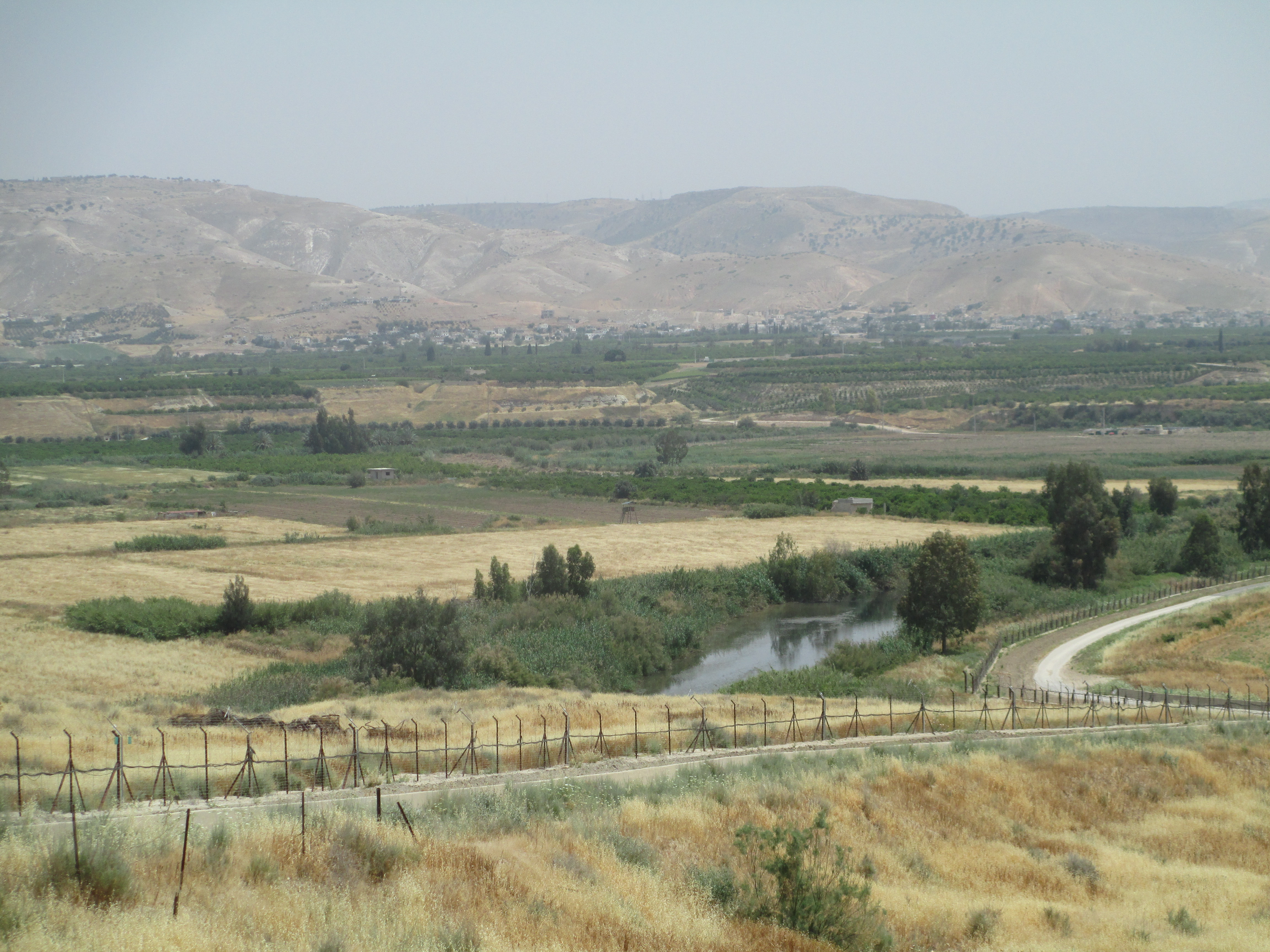
- Etymology: Jordana
- Location within Jezreel Valley region of Israel
- Coordinates: 32°34′0″N 35°33′50″E
- Country: Israel
- District: Northern
- Subdistrict: Jezreel
- Council: Valley of Springs
- Affiliation: Moshavim Movement
- Founded: 1952
- Founder: Kurdish immigrants
- Population (2024): 581

Yardena (Hebrew: יַרְדֵּנָה) is a moshav in northern Israel. Located on route 90, 13 kilometers north of Beit She'an, it falls under the jurisdiction of Valley of Springs Regional Council. In 2024 it had a population of 581.

== History ==
Yardena was founded in 1952 by immigrants to Israel from Iraqi Kurdistan. It is named "Yardena" (Jordan in Hebrew) because it is on the Jordan River. A school in the moshav was converted into the Center for Kurdistan Cultural Heritage.
