= Mount Gilboa =

Mountain in Israel

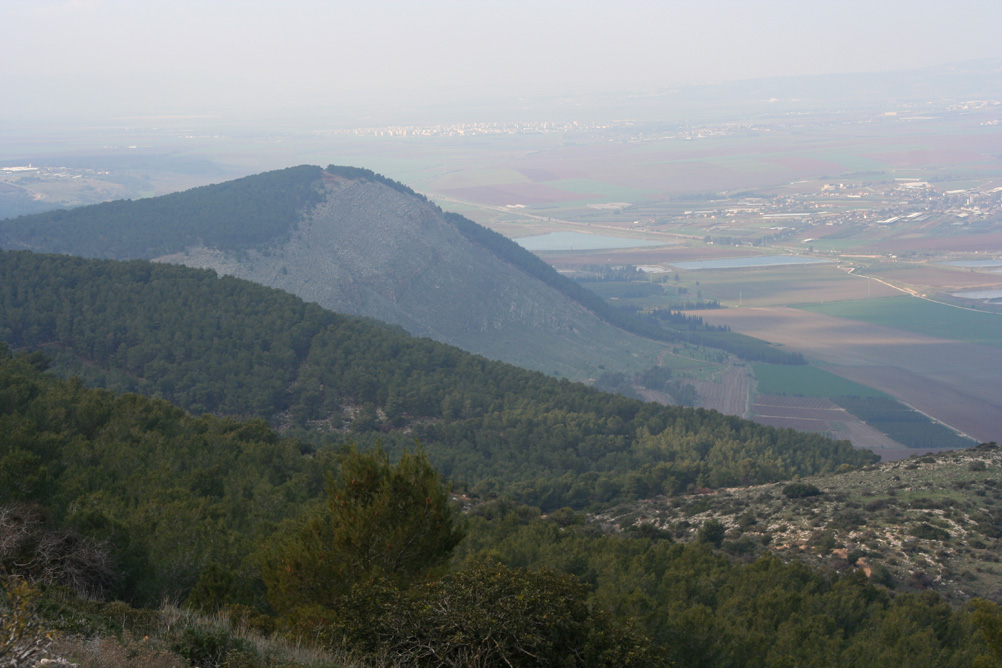
- Mount Gilboa, 2007

Highest point
- Elevation: 496 m (1,627 ft)
- Coordinates: 32°26′02″N 35°24′52″E

Geography
- Location within Israel
- Location: Northern District, Israel

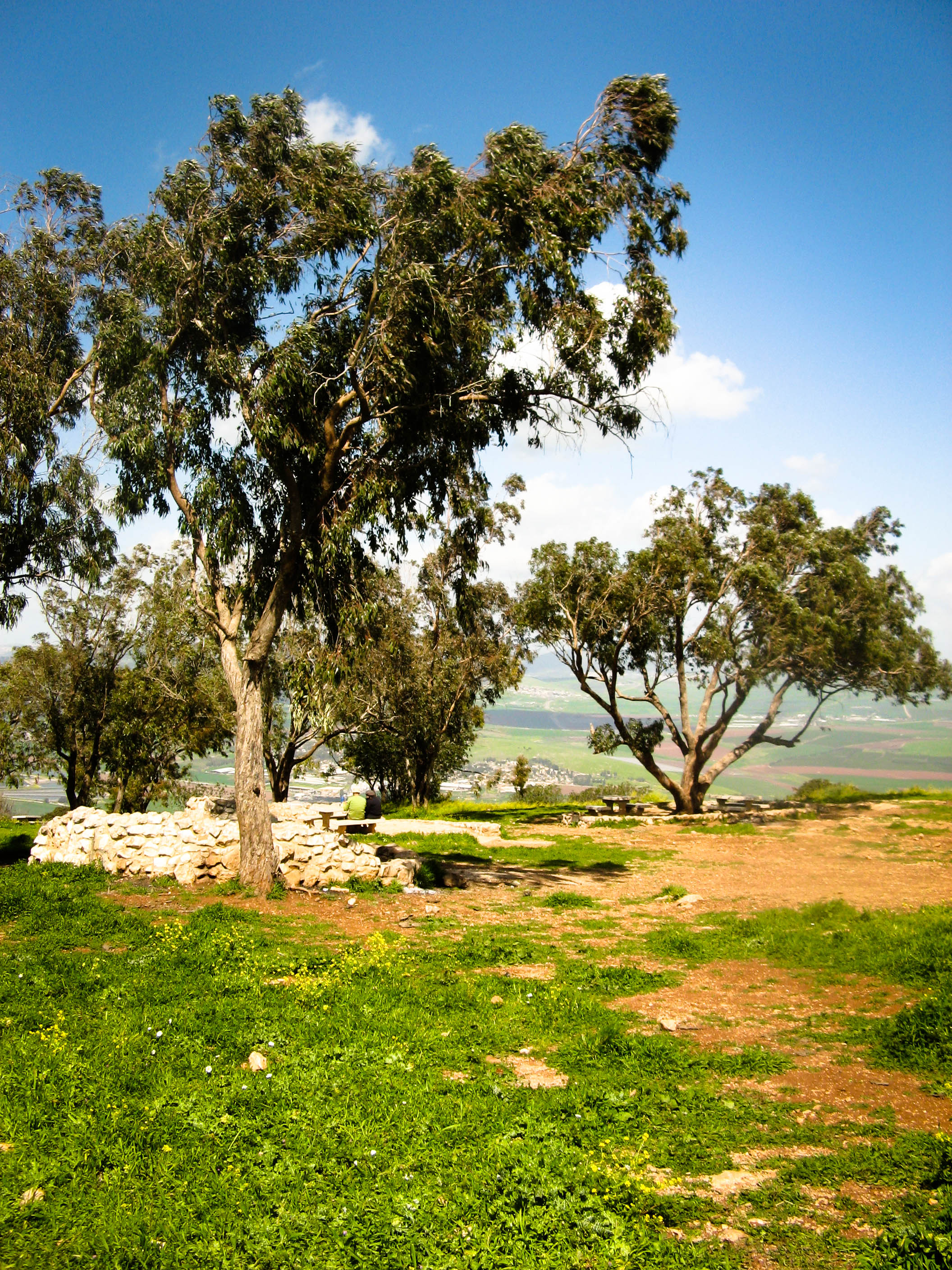
Scenery on Mount Gilboa

Mount Gilboa (Hebrew: הַר הַגִּלְבֹּעַ, romanized: Har hagGīlbōaʿ; Arabic: جبل جلبوع Jabal Jalbūʿ or جبل فقوعة Jabal Fuqqāʿa), sometimes referred to as the Mountains of Gilboa, is a mountain range in Israel. It overlooks the Harod Valley (the eastern part of the larger Jezreel Valley) to the north, and the Jordan Valley and Hills to the southeast and to the west, respectively.

Gilboa is identified as the location of Saul's last battle and suicide in the Books of Samuel.

== Etymology ==
=== Gilboa ===
The meaning of the Hebrew name "Gilboa" is unknown. It is possible that it originates from a former, non-Semitic toponym, where gil referred to "mountain," the second part consisting of an unknown element.

== In the Bible ==
In the Hebrew Bible, Saul, Israel's first king, led a charge against the Philistines at Mount Gilboa (1 Samuel 28:4). The battle ends with the king falling on his own sword and Saul's sons, Jonathan, Abinadab, and Melchishua being killed in battle (1 Samuel 31:1–4). King David, who hears about the tragedy after the battle, curses the mountain:

Ye mountains of Gilboa, let there be no dew nor rain upon you, neither fields of choice fruits; for there the shield of the mighty was vilely cast away, the shield of Saul, anointed with oil (2 Samuel 1:21).

== History ==
A minor battle between the army of the Crusader Kingdom of Jerusalem and Sultan Saladin took place at the foot of Mount Gilboa in 1183.

The 1260 Battle of Ain Jalut was fought at the foot of Mount Gilboa. The success of the Muslim Mamluks against the Mongols marked the end of the westward push of the Asian empire and ensured the survival of Muslim Egypt.

== Geography ==
The formation has the shape of a boomerang, extending north from the highlands of the West Bank and turning northwest at about half its length, thus separating the southeastern end of the Jezreel Valley to the west, from the Beit She'an and Ein Harod valleys to the east. The range's highest peak rises 496 meters above sea level.

== Flora and fauna ==
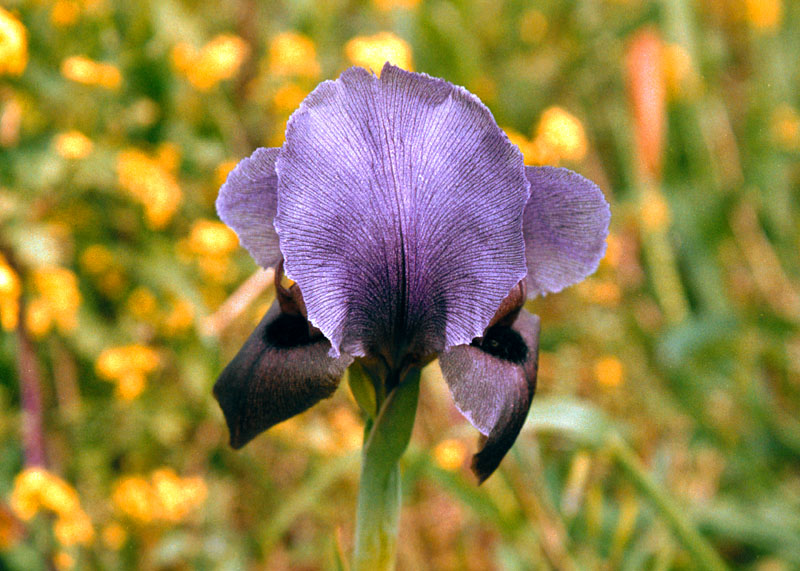
Gilboa iris (Iris haynei)

In 1976 and 1977, Mount Gilboa was counted to have about 170 plant species, including Pinus halepensis (on the rocky slopes) and Pistacia lentiscus (the shrub layer).

Every year from late February until late March the purple Hayne's Iris, the national flower of Palestine, known in Arabic as the Fukkua Iris, and in Hebrew as the Gilboa Iris, blooms on the mountain. Two nature reserves have been declared on the ridge: the Gilboa Iris nature reserve in 1970, covering 7,280 dunams (728 ha), and the eastern Gilboa reserve in 2005, covering 18,290 dunams (1,829 ha).

It also has a very diverse animal species range, with 14 reptile, 7 rodent, 31 bird and 13 isopod species.

== See also ==
- Gideon and Well of Harod
- Gilboa Regional Council
- Ma'ale Gilboa – a religious kibbutz on Mount Gilboa
- Malkishua – a drug rehabilitation centre on Mount Gilboa
- Meirav – a religious kibbutz on Mount Gilboa
