= Beit She'an Valley =

Valley in Northern District, Israel

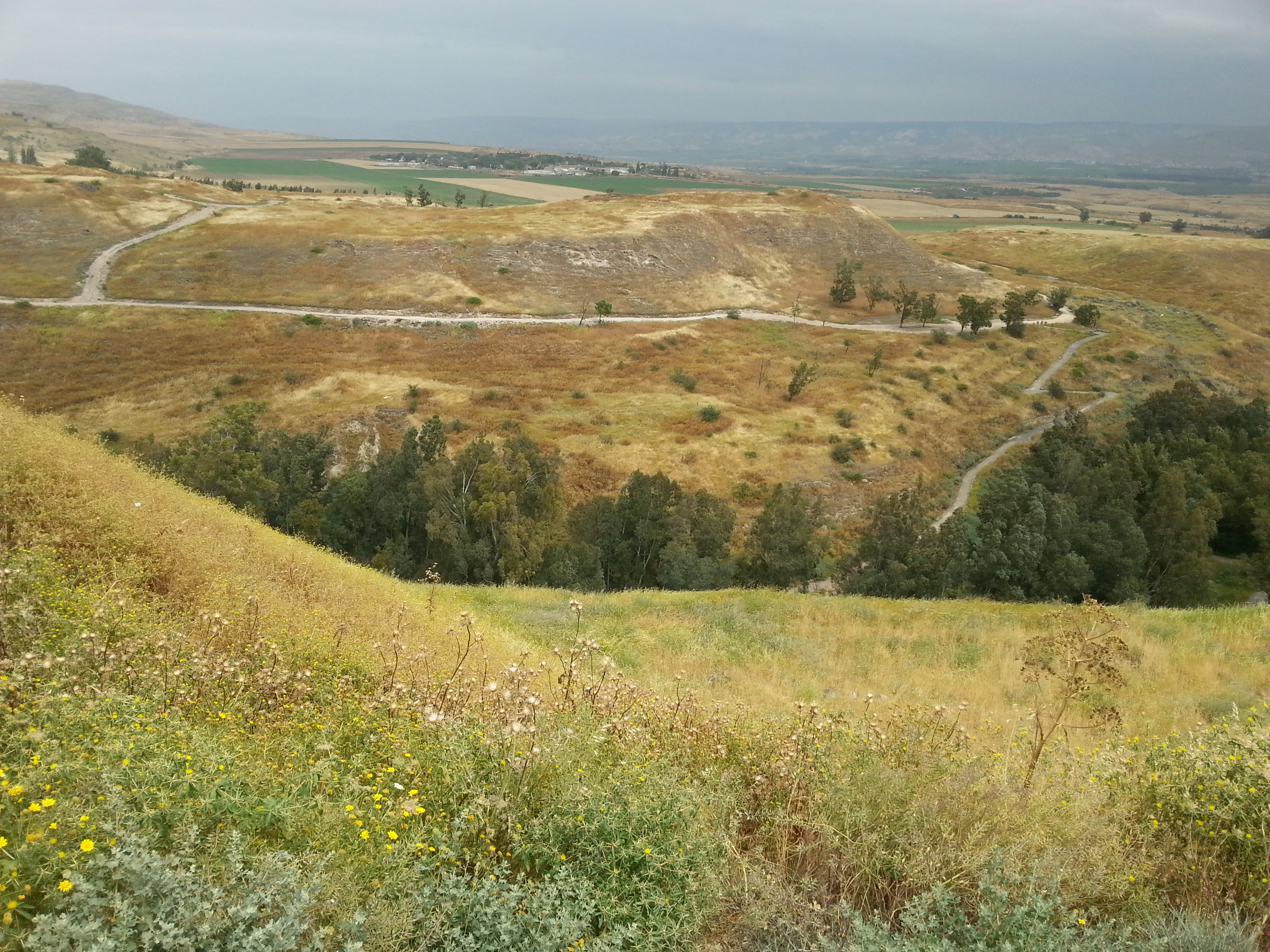
Beit She'an Valley

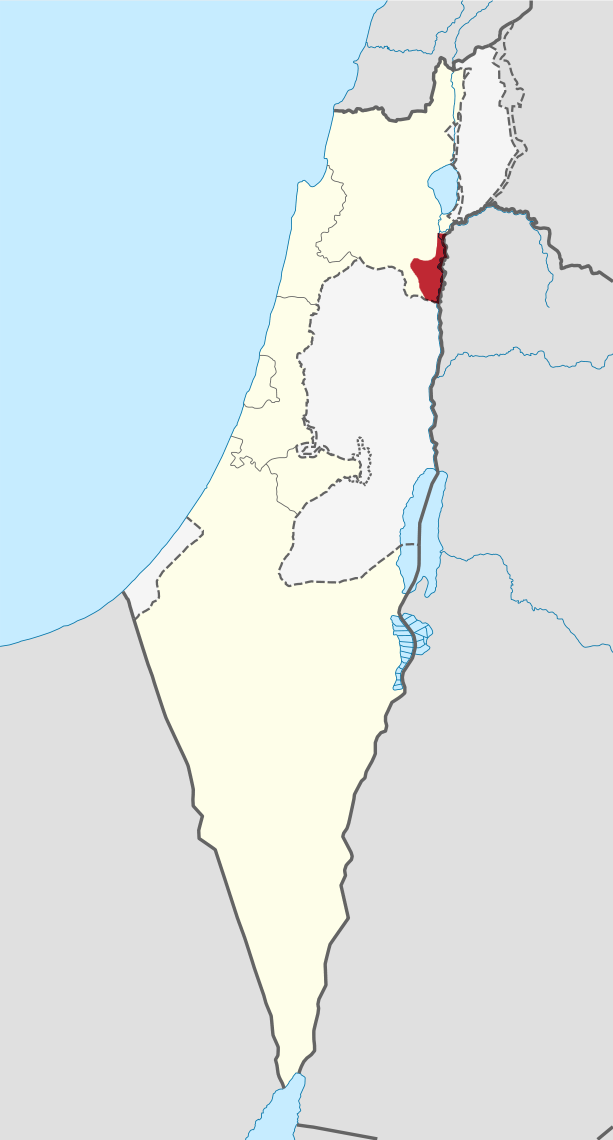
Beit She'an Valley in Israel, marked red

The Beit She'an Valley (Hebrew: בקעת בית שאן or Hebrew: עמק בית שאן) is a valley in Israel.

The valley lies within the Beit She'an rift, part of the Afro-Syrian Rift (Jordan Rift Valley), which opens westwards to the Harod Valley. It is a middle part of the Jordan Valley. The valley is bounded by the Mount Gilboa mountain range from the southwest, Jordan River from the east, Nahal Tavor from the north, the lower part of the Wadi el Maleh (Malcha Stream/Nahal Malcha), where it flows into the Jordan River, from the south. It is named after the ancient city of Beit She'an.

During the Ottoman period, the Beit She'an Valley formed part of the Bedouin Turabay emirate (1517-1683). During the 18th century, the dominant local power in the valley were the Bedouins of the Banu Saqr tribe. Although weakened by their conflicts with the Acre-based strongmen Daher al-Umar and Ahmad Pasha al-Jazzar and their successors, this tribe remained the predominant group of the valley, particularly the areas west and south of Beit She'an, throughout the 19th century. The smaller tribes that lived in the others parts of the valley during this period were the Ghazzawiya, Bashatwa and the Balawna.

The valley is abundant in springs. For this reason, in order to attract tourism, the Beit She'an Valley Regional Council was rebranded as the Emek HaMaayanot Regional Council ("Valley of Springs Regional Council")

It includes the Beit She'an National park in the northern part of Beit She'an.

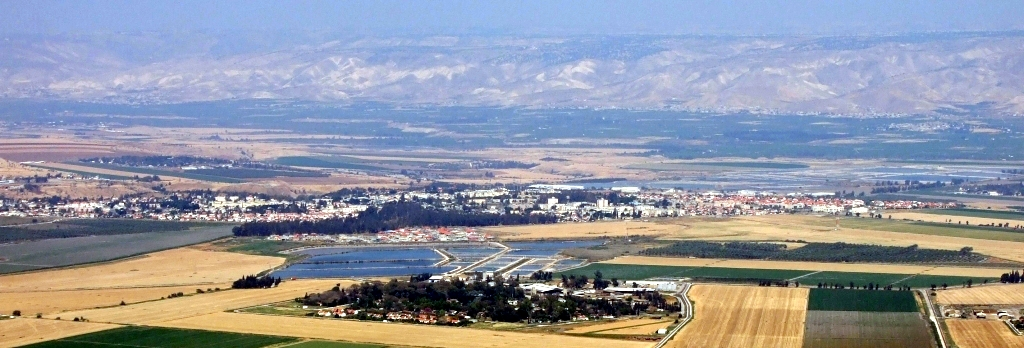
Panorama of Beit She'an and the surroundings

== See also ==
- Geography of Israel

== Sources ==
- Canaan, Tawfiq (1936). "The Ṣaqr Bedouin of Bîsān". Journal of the Palestine Oriental Society. 16: 21–32.
- Cohen, Amnon (1973). Palestine in the 18th Century: Patterns of Government and Administration. Jerusalem: The Magnes Press. ISBN 978-0-19-647903-3.
- Kark, Ruth; Frantzman, Seth J. (2010). "Bedouin, Abdül Hamid II, British Land Settlement and Zionism: The Baysan Valley and Sub-district 1831–1948". Israel Studies. 15 (2): 49–79. doi:10.2979/isr.2010.15.2.49.
- Sharon, Moshe (1999). Corpus Inscriptionum Arabicarum Palaestinae, Volume Two: B–C. Leiden, Boston and Köln: Bril. ISBN 90-04-11083-6.
