= Tirat Zvi =

Kibbutz in Northern District, Israel

Tirat Zvi: טִירַת צְבִי (Hebrew)
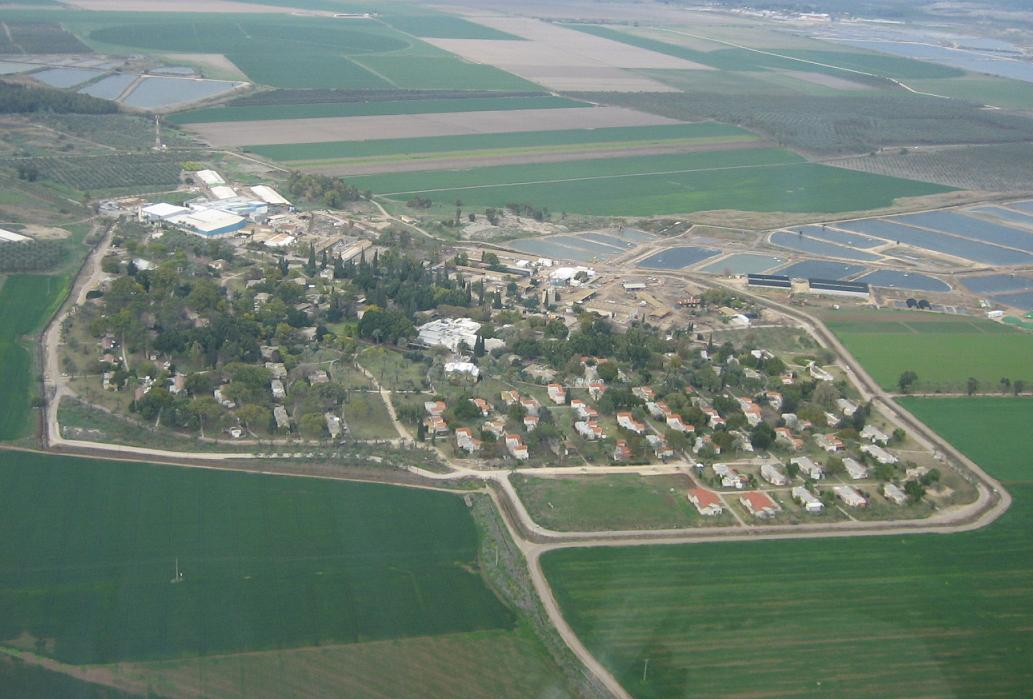

- Location within Jezreel Valley region of Israel Location within Israel
- Coordinates: 32°25′18″N 35°31′28″E
- Country: Israel
- District: Northern
- Subdistrict: Jezreel
- Council: Valley of Springs
- Affiliation: Religious Kibbutz Movement
- Founded: 30 June 1937
- Founder: German, Polish and Romanian Jews
- Population (2024): 1,126
- Website: tiratzvi.org.il

Tirat Zvi (Hebrew: טִירַת צְבִי, lit. Zvi Castle) is a religious kibbutz in the Beit She'an Valley, ten kilometers south of the city of Beit She'an, Israel, just west of the Jordan River and the Israel-Jordan border. It falls under the jurisdiction of Valley of Springs Regional Council. In 2024 it had a population of 1,126.

== Etymology ==
Tirat Zvi means Zvi's Fort. It was named after Rabbi Zvi Hirsch Kalischer (1795–1874), one of the fathers of the Zionist Movement and a leader of Hovevei Zion, while the tira or "fort" refers to a two-story mud-brick structure purchased from the Arab landowner, Musa al-Alami.

== History ==
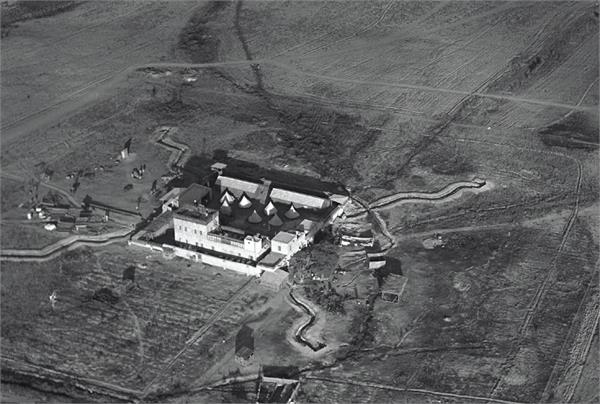
Tirat Zvi in 1939

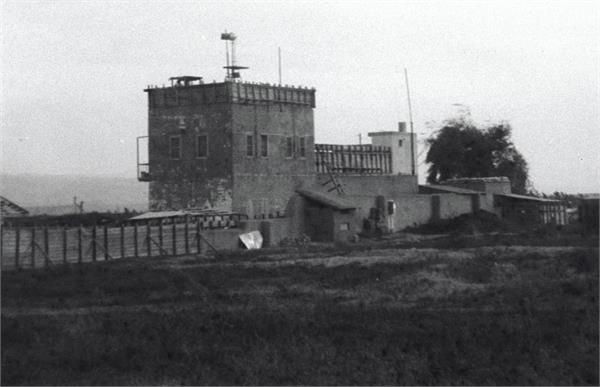
Tirat Zvi in 1937

The kibbutz was founded on 30 June 1937, during the 1936–1939 Arab revolt in Palestine, as part of the Tower and Stockade settlement enterprise. The founders were Jews from Germany, Poland and Romania and came from three groups: Kvutzat Rodges near Petah Tikva, Kvutzat Shahal near Rehovot, and Kfar Yavetz. The Rodges group was named after the German village where the Religious Zionist hakhshara centre (agricultural farm preparing youth for aliyah, or resettlement in Mandate Palestine) was located through which many of the founders of Tirat Zvi had passed. Kvutzat Shahal was named after the founder of the Mizrachi movement, Shmuel Chaim Landau (1892–1928), known by his Hebrew acronym "ShaChaL", or "lion".

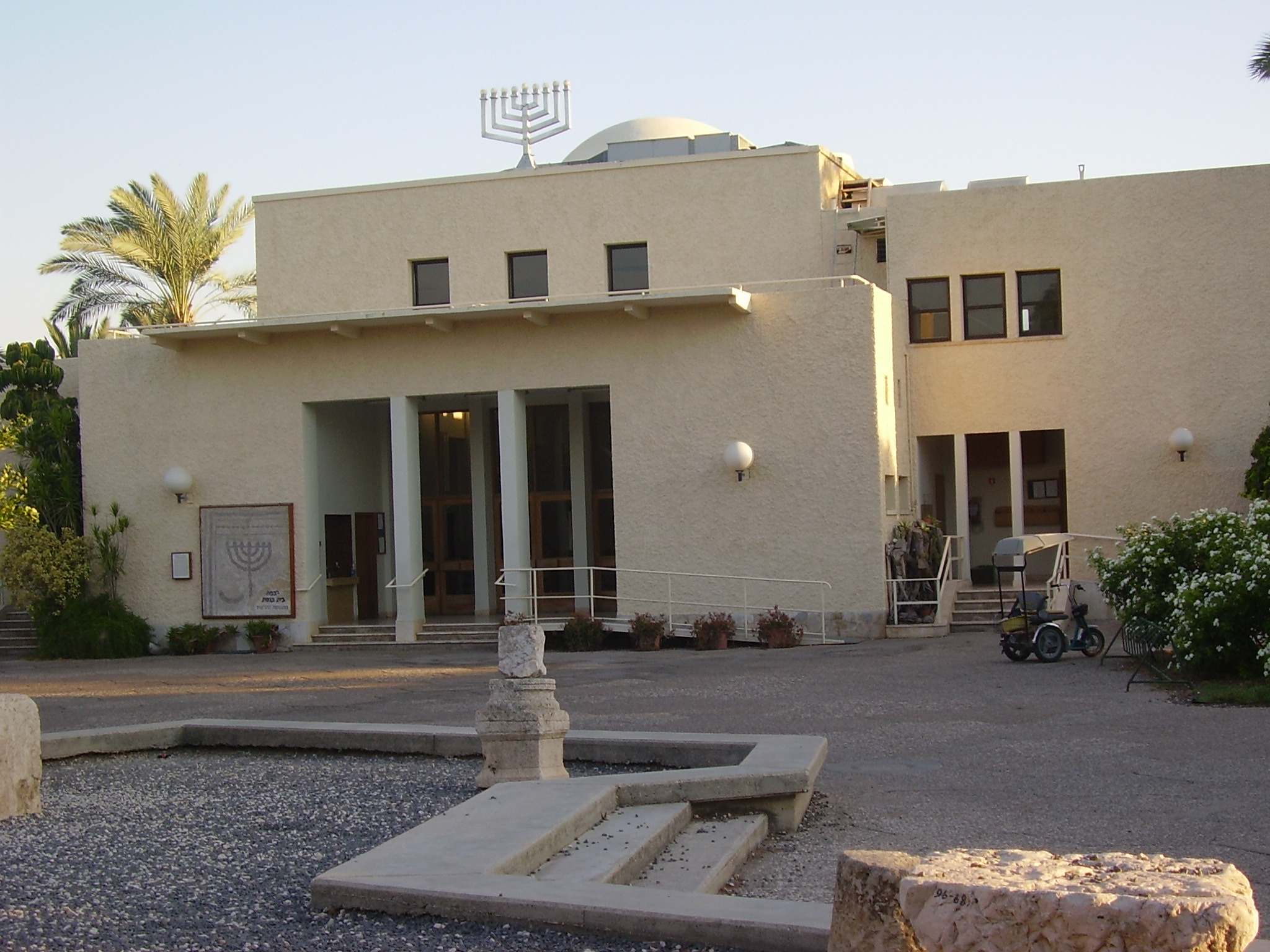
Tirat Zvi synagogue

The kibbutz was attacked on 28 February 1938, still during the Arab revolt, by a group of armed Arabs. The attack was repelled with many casualties on both sides. On 20 February 1948, before the neighboring Arab nations officially joined the 1948 Arab–Israeli War, a battalion of the Arab Liberation Army led by Muhammed Safa attacked Tirat Zvi. The ALA unit was repelled after 60 of the attackers were killed. One kibbutz member, Naftali Friedlander, was also killed in the fighting.

Despite the attacks on the kibbutz, its population grew from 106 in 1937 to 328 by 1948. Part of the lands surrounding the kibbutz, totaling 2,150 dunams, were purchased by the Jewish National Fund from German Templar families in 1939.

The kibbutz of Tirat Zvi was established on land near the former depopulated villages of al-Khunayzir and al-Zarra'a.

== Climate ==
Tirat Zvi sits 220 meters below sea level. On 21 June 1942, it recorded the highest daytime temperature in Asia (54.4 °C; 129.2 °F), although the validity of this measurement has been questioned. Based on the published thermograph data it seems to have been somewhere between 52.0 and 54.4 °C.

== Economy ==
The kibbutz operates a meat processing factory, Tiv, which sells its products locally and abroad. Tirat Zvi is the largest date-palm grower in Israel, with 18,000 trees. The kibbutz also has a lulav business. Working with scientists from the Volcani Institute, Tirat Zvi developed a method of preserving the palm fronds for several months, allowing them to be harvested in the spring and sold in the fall, for use on the holiday of Sukkot. In 2009, it produced 70,000 lulavs.

== Archaeology ==
At Tell Radra, a nearby archaeological site, a repurposed dedication to the Palmyran god Azizos, intended for the well-being of the emperors, was discovered in a ruined structure. It is engraved on a flat basalt stone and found its current location at the Katzrin Archaeological Museum.
