= Ein HaNetziv =

Kibbutz in northern Israel

Ein HaNetziv: עין הנצי"ב (Hebrew)
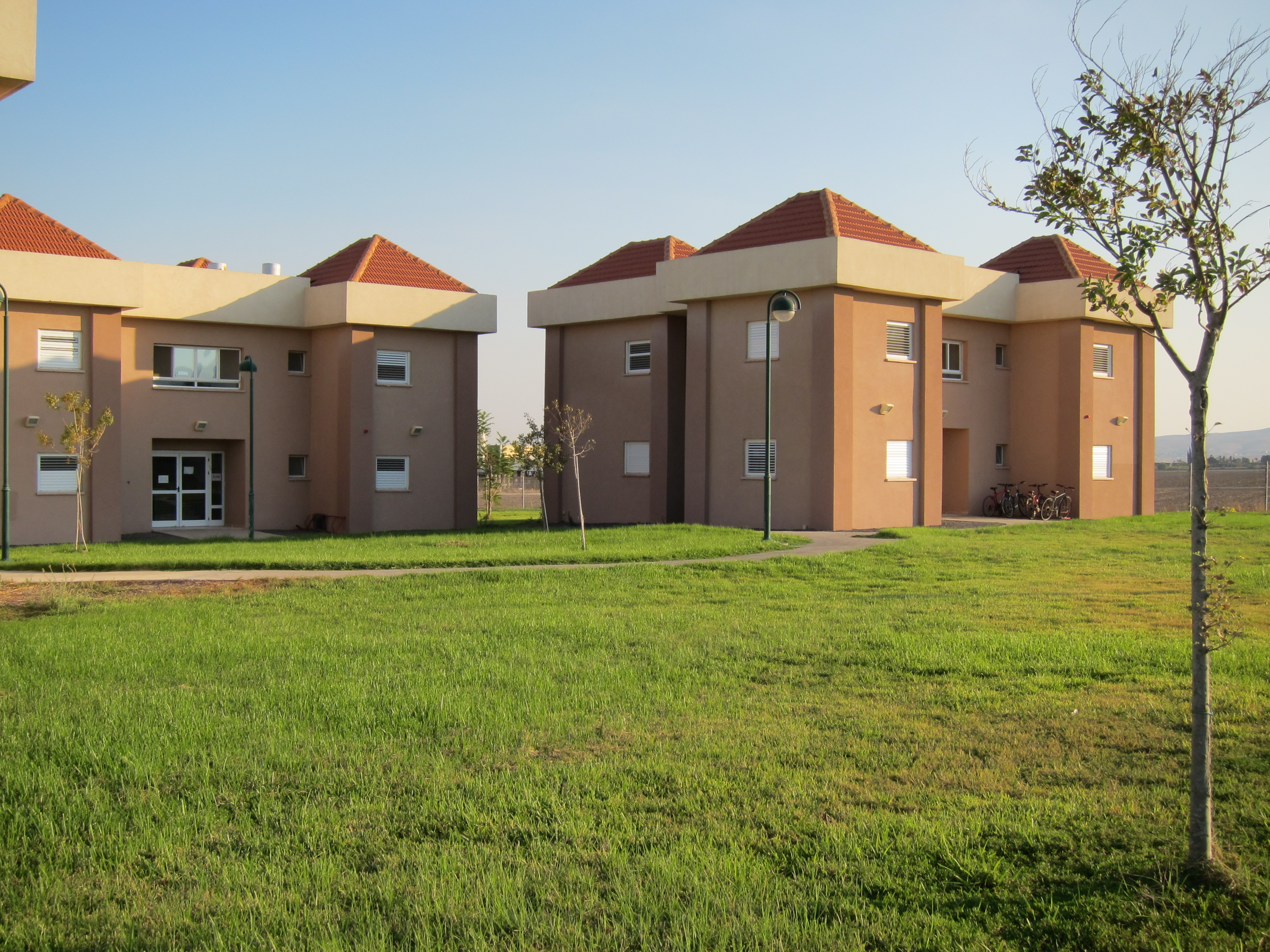
- Ein HaNatziv, dormitories at seminary for women
- Etymology: Spring of the Netziv
- Location within Jezreel Valley region of Israel Location within Israel
- Coordinates: 32°28′13″N 35°30′9″E
- Country: Israel
- District: Northern
- Subdistrict: Jezreel
- Council: Valley of Springs
- Affiliation: Religious Kibbutz Movement
- Founded: 1946
- Founder: Bnei Akiva members
- Population (2024): 749
- Website: http://www.hanatziv.org.il/

Ein HaNetziv (Hebrew: עין הנצי"ב, lit. 'Spring of the Netziv') is a kibbutz in the Beit She'an Valley in northern Israel. Belonging to the Religious Kibbutz Movement, it is located about three kilometers south of the ancient city of Beit She'an, 130 meters below sea level. It falls under the jurisdiction of Valley of Springs Regional Council. In 2024 it had a population of 749.

== Etymology ==
The name, translating to "Spring of (the) Netziv" (alt. Ên ha-nasib), comes from the springs found here, plus the initials of Rabbi Naftali Zvi Yehuda Berlin, the "Netziv of Volozhin" (1816 – 1893), who was one of the greatest rabbis of Russia at the end of the 19th century.

== History ==
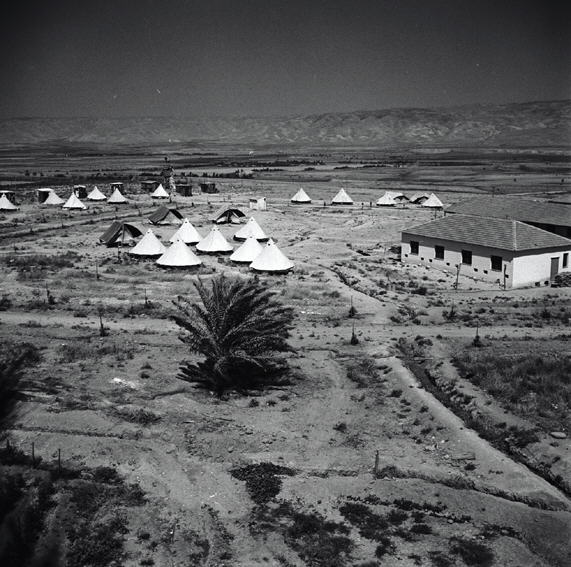
Ein Hanetziv 1946

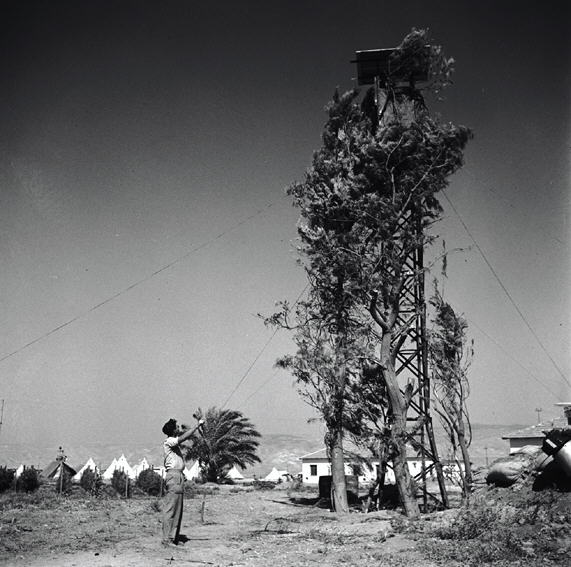
Ein Hanetziv watchtower 1946

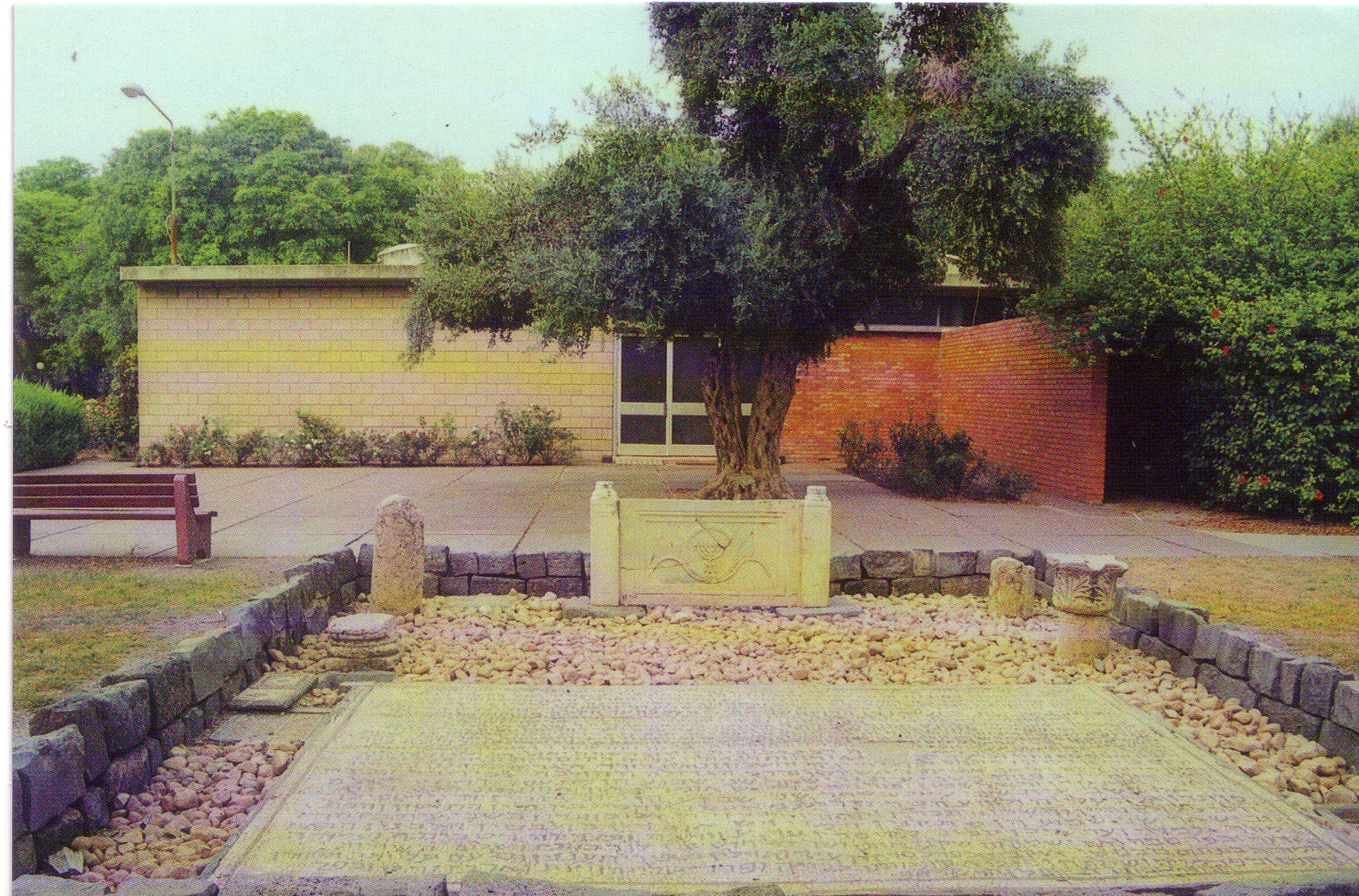
Mosaic of Rehob replica outside kibbutz synagogue

The kibbutz was established on 17 January 1946 (Tu BiShvat, 5706) on a site known in Arabic as "el-Wakwaka" by a group of young people of the Bnei Akiva Movement from Germany called "Emonim". The Emunim group was initially intended to replace the Avraham group and settle in Kfar Etzion, the first community in the Gush Etzion. However, in the end, it was the Avraham group that established Kfar Etzion in 1943.

In the late 1960s, while preparing the lands for cultivation, members of the kibbutz discovered the Mosaic of Rehob among the ruins of an ancient synagogue.

== Economy ==
The economy of the village today is based on agriculture (a herd of about a thousand cattle, extensive orchards of date palms and olive trees, cereal crops) and a plastics factory, Palziv, which exports all over the world.

== Education ==
Within the kibbutz there are several educational establishments. The Religious Kibbutz Movement's religious seminary for young women (Midreshet Kibbutz HaDati / מדרשת עין הנצי"ב) offers several programs: Torah study pre- and post sherut leumi; similar integration with military service; an overseas program; intensive training for "instructors in halakha" (Jewish law).

The kibbutz also hosts an intensive study course or "ulpan" for French speakers wishing to convert to Judaism, which offers Hebrew language and Orthodox Judaism classes.
