= Mesilot =

Kibbutz in northern Israel

Mesilot: מסילות (Hebrew)
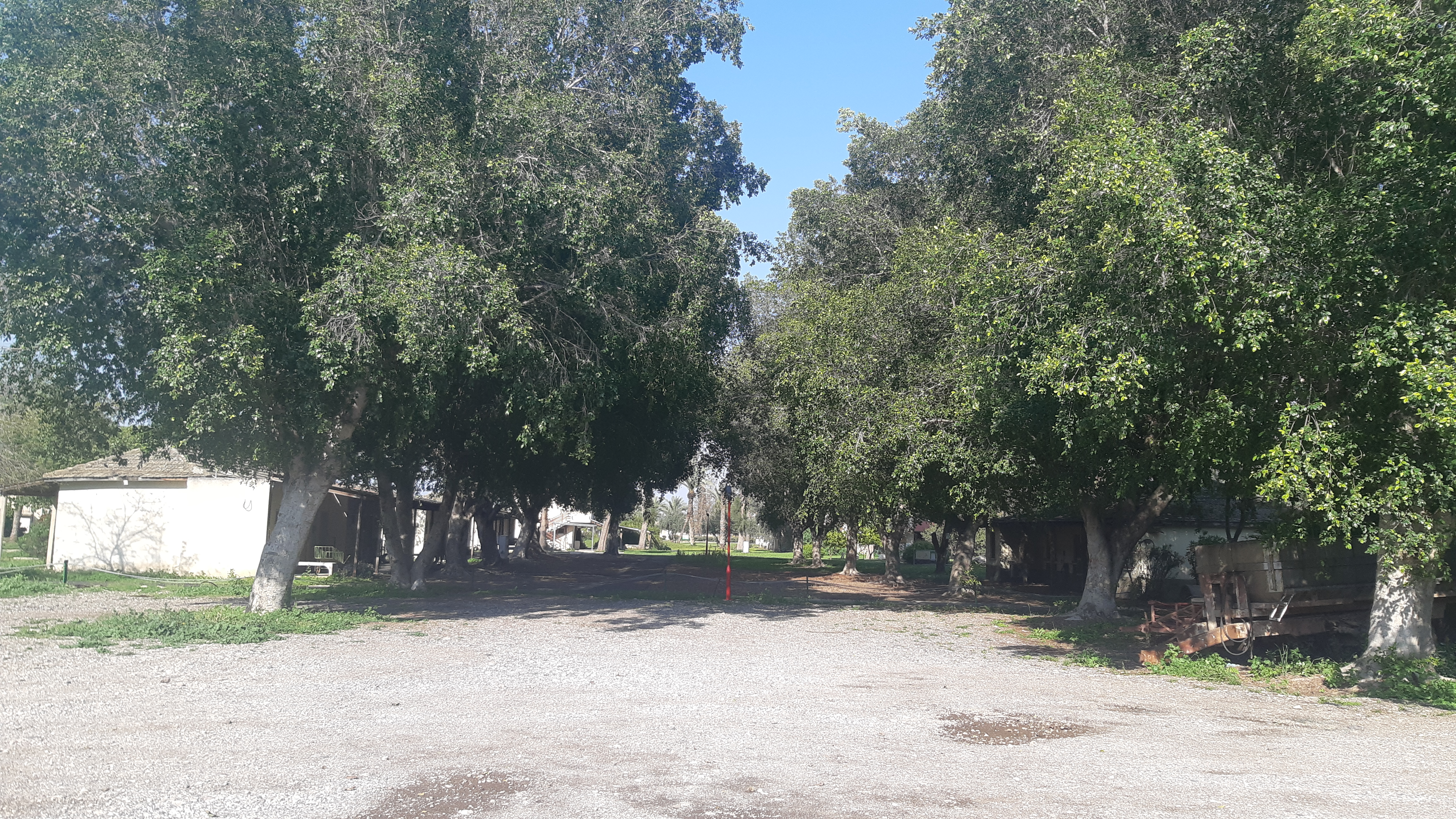
- Etymology: Tracks
- Location within Jezreel Valley region of Israel Location within Israel
- Coordinates: 32°29′43″N 35°28′28″E
- Country: Israel
- District: Northern
- Subdistrict: Jezreel
- Council: Valley of Springs
- Affiliation: Kibbutz Movement
- Founded: 22 December 1938
- Founder: Bulgarian and Polish Hashomer Hatzair members
- Population (2024): 494
- Website: http://messilot.net

Mesilot (Hebrew: מסילות, lit. 'Tracks') is a kibbutz in northern Israel. Located in the Beit She'an Valley near the city of Beit She'an, it falls under the jurisdiction of Valley of Springs Regional Council. In 2024 it had a population of 494.

== History ==
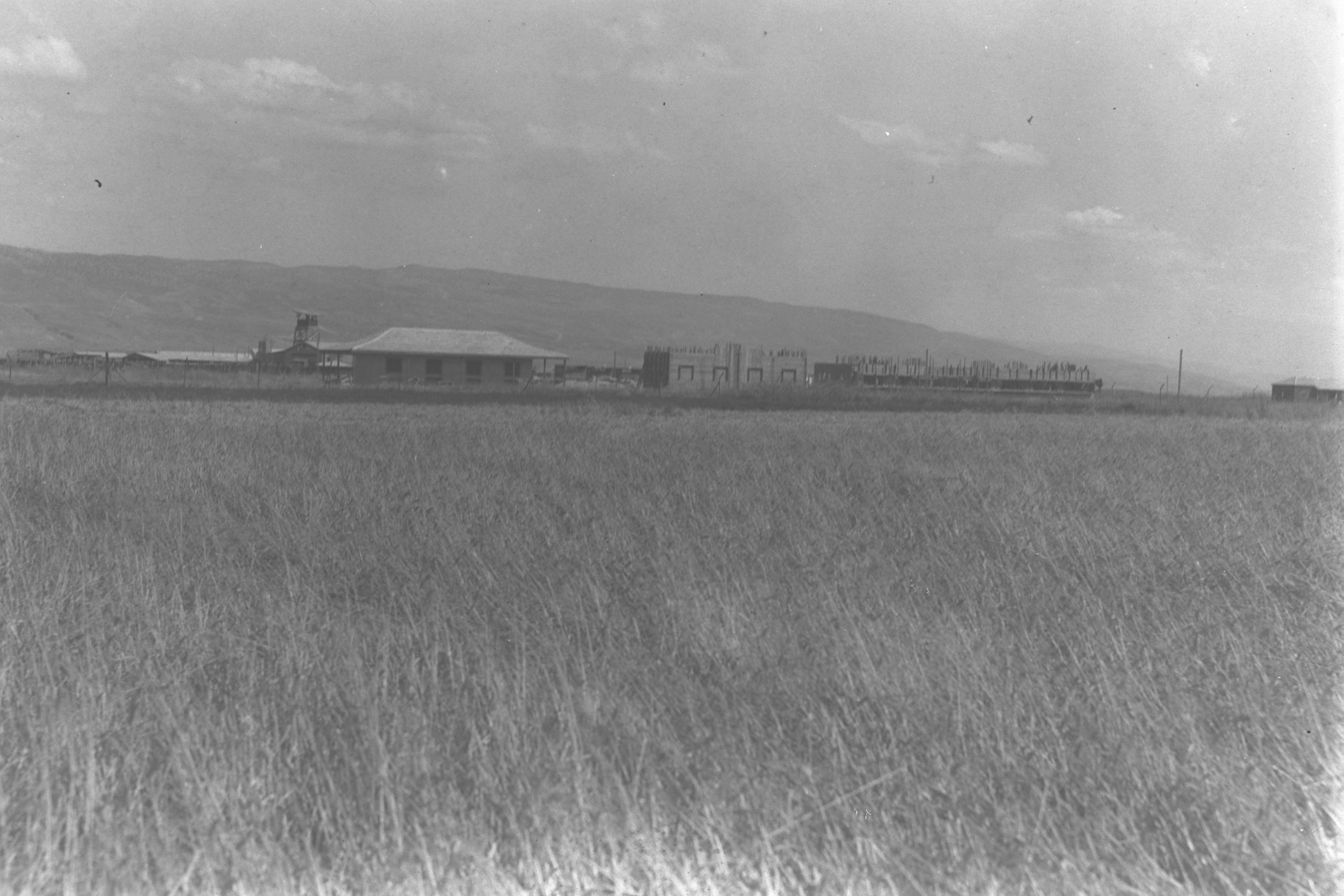
Mesilot, June 1939

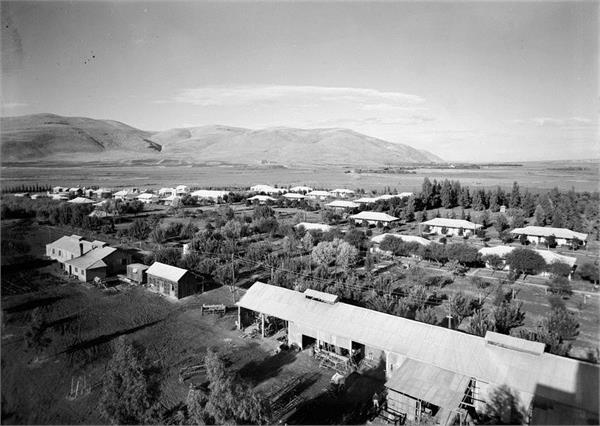
Mesilot. 1 January 1946

The community was initially formed as an urban kibbutz in Givat Michael near Ness Ziona by immigrants from Poland - who were members of the "BaMesilah" group from which the kibbutz takes its name -, and Bulgaria - members of the "Bulgaria - Tel Hai group" -, with both groups belonging to the Hashomer Hatzair movement.

The kibbutz itself was established on 22 December 1938, as a tower and stockade settlement. During the 1948 Arab–Israeli War, the kibbutz was bombed by an Iraqi airplane. One member of the kibbutz was killed in the bombing, and some other members were injured.

On 16 April 1957 two guards of kibbutz Mesilot were killed by Palestinian terrorists who came from the West Bank, then part of Jordan.

== Economy ==
Mesilot is the home of Wire Ropes Works Messilot Ltd., one of the largest producers of wire rope in Israel and the Middle East. The kibbutz also engages in various forms of agriculture, including livestock (milking cows and raising chickens), a fishery, an orchard, plantings of olives and dates, and other vegetables.

== Education ==
=== 1st to 6th grade ===
The children of the kibbutz are educated in the regional school within the kibbutz, which also serves children from the nearby kibbutzim Reshafim, Nir David, Beit Hashita, Sde Nahum and Beit Alfa.

=== School for children with autism ===
Next to the elementary school, based on the donation of Yehudit ben Moshe (who was a member of Mesilot and the first principal of its school), a special school was founded for children with autism.

=== 7th to 12th grade ===
Typical children from grades 7 through 12 used to be educated at the Gilboa School, which was founded next to Kibbutz Beit Alfa and was run jointly by Mesilot, Reshafim, Nir David and Beit Alfa. In 2005 this school was closed, so the students of Mesilot transferred to the regional school at Neve Eitan.

== Sports ==
The club was home to a football team, which was sponsored by the local Wire Works factory and played under the name Hapoel Kvalim Mesilot. In 2009 the team was merged with Hapoel Beit She'an to form Hapoel Beit She'an Mesilot, which play its home games in nearby Beit She'an.

== Notable people ==
- Orly Levy (born 1973), politician
- Nahum Tevet (born 1946), sculptor
