= Tzur Moshe =

Moshav in central Israel

Tzur Moshe: צוּר מֹשֶׁה (Hebrew)
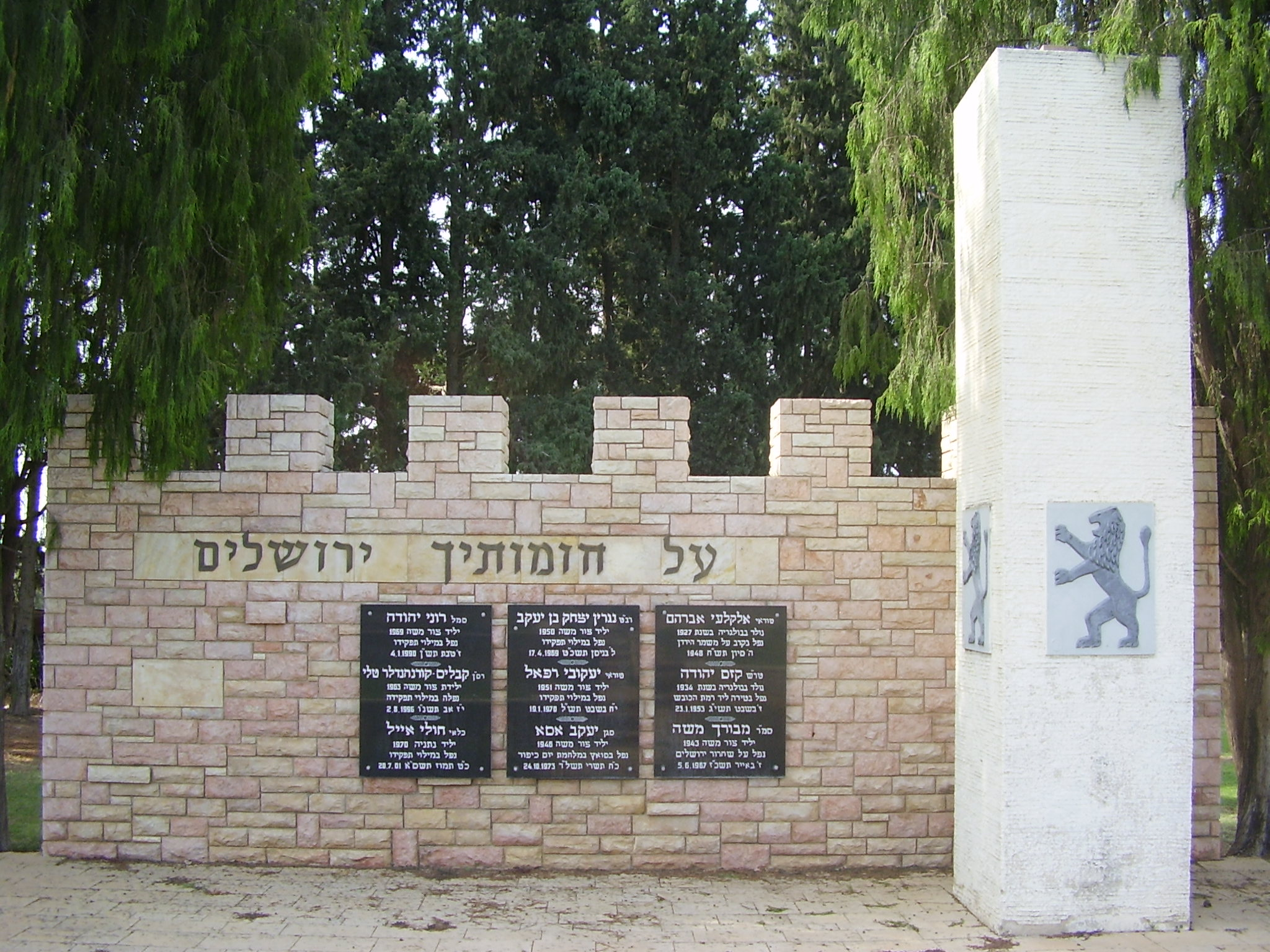
- War memorial in Tzur Moshe
- Etymology: Rock of Moses
- Location within Central Israel Location within Israel
- Coordinates: 32°17′53″N 34°54′50″E
- Country: Israel
- District: Central
- Subdistrict: HaSharon
- Council: Lev HaSharon
- Founded: 13 September 1937
- Founder: Greek immigrants
- Population (2024): 2,769
- Website: www.zurmoshe.co.il

Tzur Moshe (Hebrew: צוּר מֹשֶׁה, lit. 'Rock of Moses') is a moshav in central Israel, in the Central district. Located in the Sharon plain near Netanya, it falls under the jurisdiction of Lev HaSharon Regional Council. In 2024 it had a population of 2,769.

== History ==
In the 1860s the Ottoman authorities gave part of the Forest of Arsuf that later became Tzur Moshe to the mountain village of Shufa, near Tulkarm. In 1936 the Hannun family of Tulkarm sold 1,068 dunams of the land (now called Ghabat Shufa) to Joshua Hankin and on 13 September 1937 the Jewish National Fund established Tzur Moshe on the land. The village was founded by a group of 20 immigrants from Kastoria, Greece as part of the tower and stockade settlement programme. It was named after Moshe Kofinas, a Greek MP and president of the Greek branch of the National Zionist Organisation in 1919. He raised money from local Jewish donors and funded the purchase of part of the land to be used for the project (funds were also offered by the Carasso family from Thessaloniki), as well as for the Hasmonean city of Tzuran which was located in the area. Kofinas died in 1924, before he could see the plans fulfilled.

Kofinas' unfinished work was carried on by his faithful following: Rabbi Ben-Zion Meir Chai Uzziel, David Florentine, Yosef Uzziel, Moshe Carasso and Leon Recanati, who joined ranks and called themselves by the name, The Dr. Moshe Kofinas Organisation of Greek Immigrants for Settlement. They worked to obtain all the necessary permits, and by 1934 the first immigrants associated with this group arrived in Magdiel. In 1935, the Jewish Agency provided a plot of land for the group near Beit Shean, where they began to build their farming settlement. However, after one year, they were redirected to a place in the Sharon Valley, where they eventually founded the present settlement in September 1937.

On Friday 9 July 2004 the park 'Athens 2004' was dedicated at Zur Moshe. The ceremony took place under the auspices of the Embassy of Greece in Israel. The ambassador Panagiotis Zografos cut the blue ribbon at the entry to the park. The park was established thanks to the support of the Jewish communities and individuals in Israel, Greece, US and elsewhere. It was initiated and designed by architect Elias Messinas and Yvette Nahmia-Messinas, and the late David Fais who oversaw the implementation of the park. Dignitaries included the Ambassador of Greece Panagiotis Zografos, the Consul in Haifa Kostas Zinovios, officials from the Embassy of Greece in Tel Aviv, dignitaries from the Board of the Netanya county and Moshav Zur Moshe, and many visitors of Greek origin from Israel and Greece.

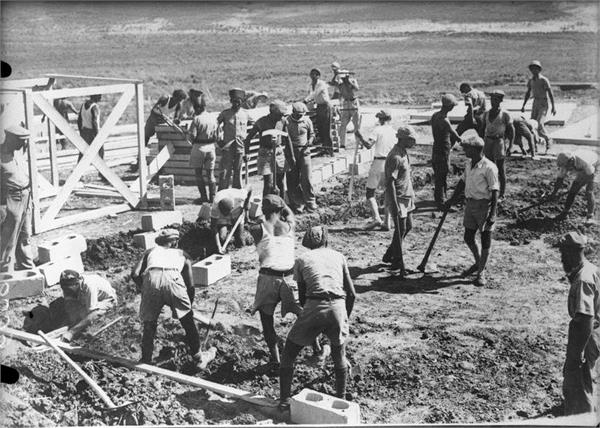
Tzur Moshe under construction 1937

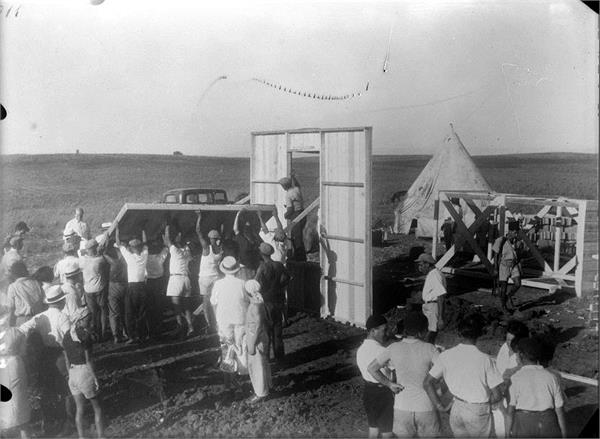
Tzur Moshe 13 September 1937

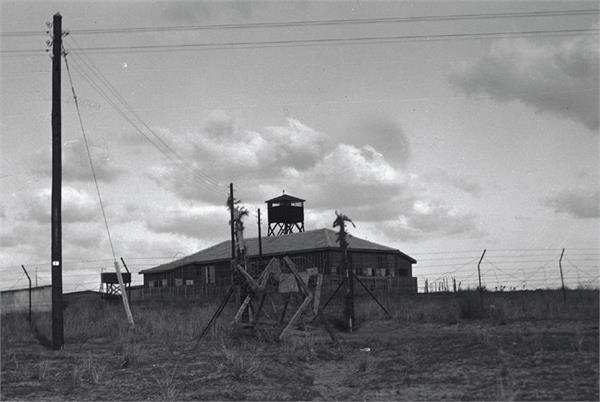
Tzur Moshe 1940

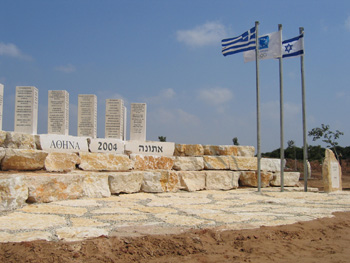
Park 'Athens 2004' established in Zur Moshe in 2004
