= Stockade =

Enclosure of palisades and tall walls made of logs

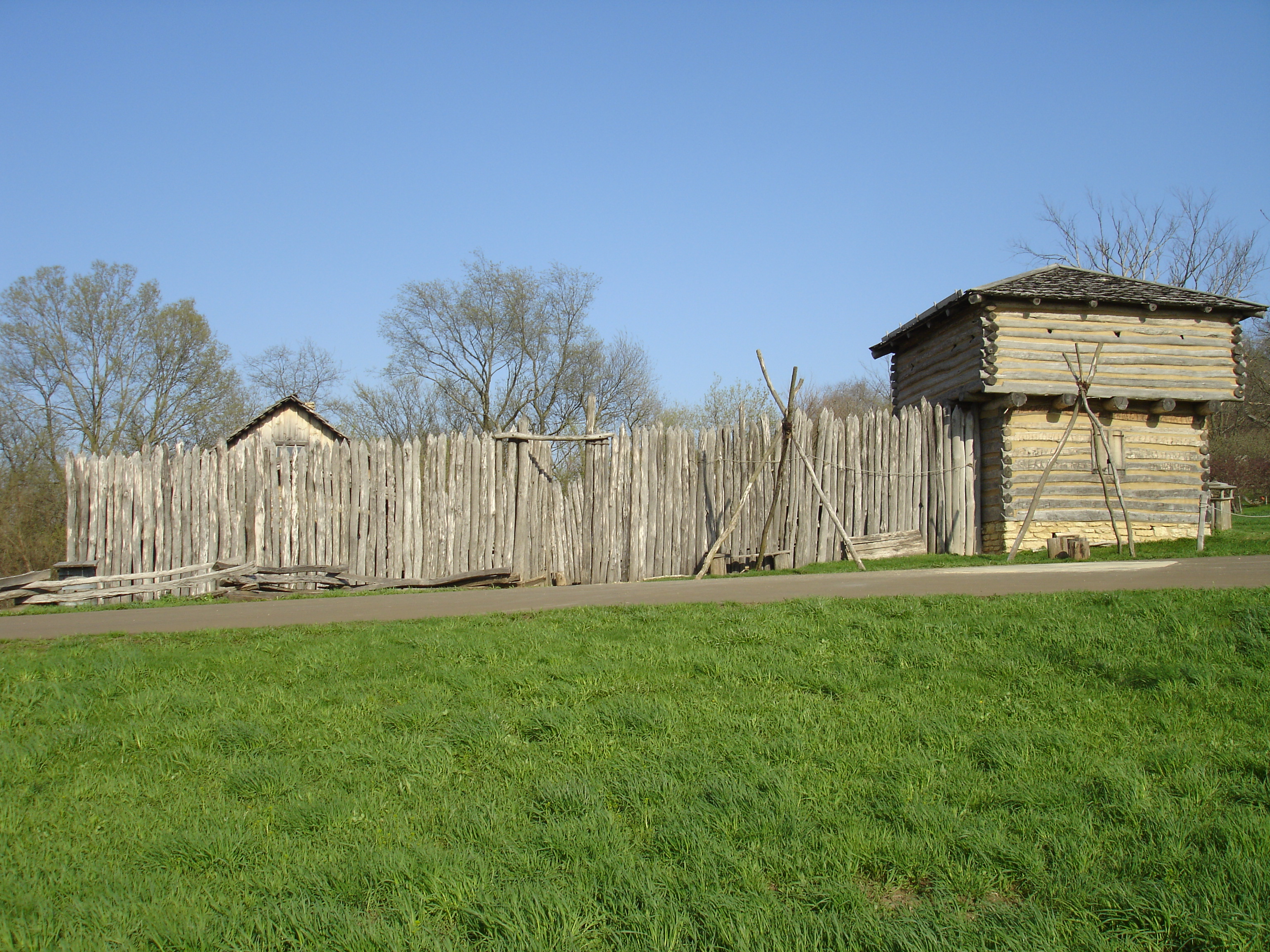
This historical reconstruction of an 1832 civilian fort from the Black Hawk War, in Illinois, featured a stockade with a blockhouse.

A stockade is an enclosure of palisades and tall walls, made of logs placed side by side vertically, with the tops sharpened as a defensive wall.

== Etymology ==
Stockade is derived from the French word estocade. The French word was derived from the Spanish word estacada.

== As a security fence ==
The troops or settlers would build a stockade by clearing a space of woodland and using the trees whole or chopped in half, with one end sharpened on each. They would dig a narrow trench around the area, and stand the sharpened logs side-by-side inside it, encircling the perimeter. Sometimes they would add additional defence by placing sharpened sticks in a shallow secondary trench outside the stockade. In colder climates sometimes the stockade received a coating of clay or mud that would make the crude wall wind-proof.

Builders could also place stones or thick mud layers at the foot of the stockade, improving the resistance of the wall. From that the defenders could, if they had the materials, raise a stone or brick wall inside the stockade, creating a more permanent defence while working protected.

== As a military prison ==
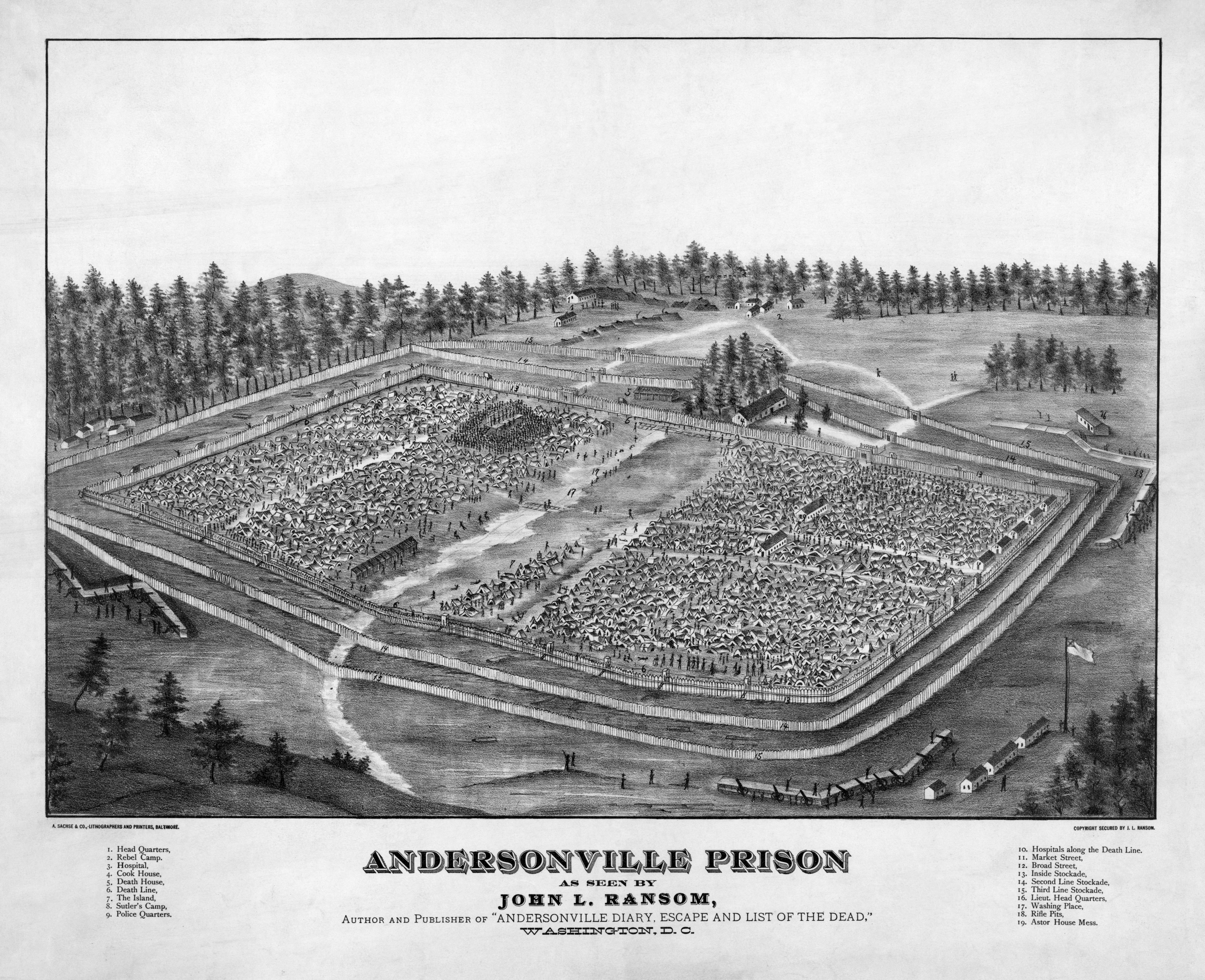
Andersonville Prison, surrounded by three rows of stockades.

The word stockade also refers to a military prison in an army camp. In some cases, the term was applied to a crude prison camp or a slave camp. In these cases, the stockade keeps people inside, rather than out.

== As decoration ==
Nowadays, stockade walls are often used as garden fencing, made of finished planks more useful for privacy fencing and more decoration than security.

== See also ==
- Security fence
- Tower and stockade, Zionist settlement form during the 1930s Arab revolt in Palestine

== Bibliography ==
- Nicolle, David (2010). Ottoman Fortifications 1300-1710. Osprey Publishing.
- Murphey, Rhoads (1999). Ottoman Warfare 1500-1700.
