= Yemima Avidar-Tchernovitz =

Israeli author of modern Hebrew children's literature

Yemima Tchernovitz-Avidar
- ימימה אבידר-טשרנוביץ
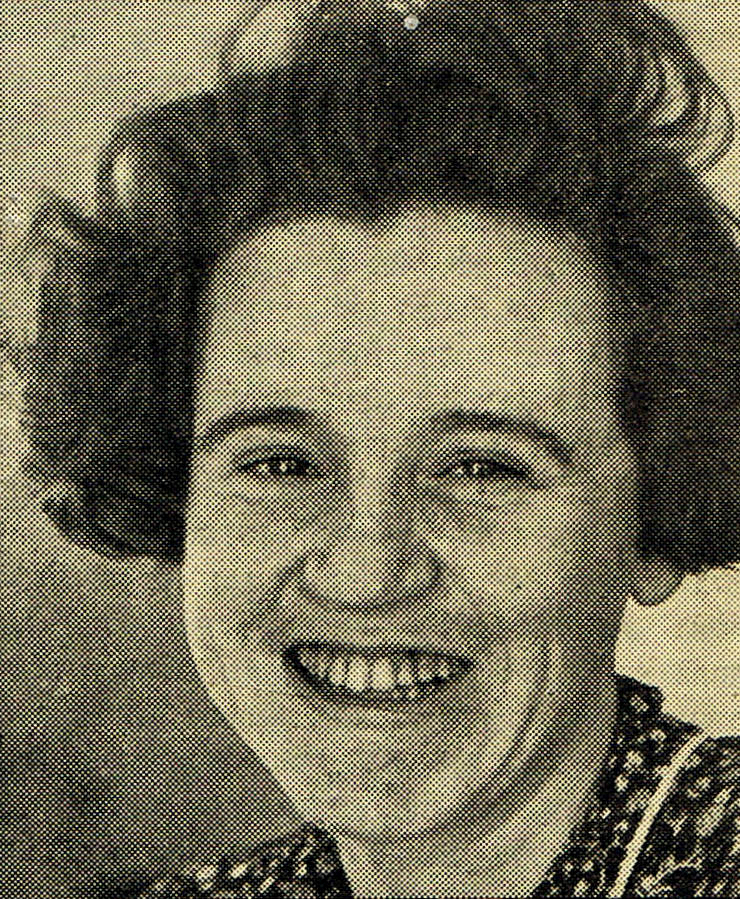
- Yemima Avidar-Tchernovitz, c. 1945
- Born: October 8, 1909; Vilnius, Russian Empire
- Died: March 20, 1998 (aged 88); Jerusalem, Israel
- Citizenship: Israeli
- Education: University of Berlin; University of Vienna
- Occupation: Author
- Spouse: Yosef Rochel (Avidar)
- Awards: 1984 Israel Prize for children's literature; 1992 Yakir Yerushalaim Award

Yemima Avidar-Tchernovitz (Hebrew: ימימה אבידר-טשרנוביץ; October 8, 1909 – March 20, 1998) was an Israeli author whose works became classics of modern Hebrew children's literature. Born in Vilna, Lithuania, in 1909, she arrived in Palestine in 1921, at the age of 12.

A teacher and school principal, she also worked in children's radio with Kol Yerushalayim, with the Nursery School Teachers' Theater and on the editorial board of Dvar HaPo'elet. One of her most famous pupils was the actor Chaim Topol. Her books for children are foundational in the sippurei havurah (band-of-friends) genre and were among the earliest based on the ordinary lives of children. In addition to her original works, she translated other works into Hebrew.

Among her honors are the Israel Prize for children's literature (1984) and the Yakir Yerushalaim award (1992).

== Publications ==
=== Books published in Hebrew ===
- Stories for Rama (Sipurim Le-Rama), Stybel, 1936
- Daliah, Hatkufah, 1940
- Naughty Muki (Muki HaShovav), Massada, 1943
- Awake Spring (Ura Ma`ayan), Yavne, 1943
- The Swallow Tells Me (HaSnunit Mesaperet), Massada, 1944
- Eight in Pursuit of One (Shmonah BeIkvot Ehad), Twersky, 1945; Keter, 1996
- He Will Bring Them (Hu Yavi Otam), Twersky, 1945
- A Pair of Shoes (Zug Na`alaim), Twersky, 1945
- Grandpa Moon (Saba Yareah), Yavne, 1945
- One of Ours (Ehad MiShelanu), Twersky, 1947
- Kindergarten Songs (Gan Gani Alef, Three volumes, with Levin Kipnis), Twersky, 1947–1952
- The Toys` Visit (Bikur HaTza`atzuim), Massada, 1949
- Two Friends on the Road (Shnei Re`im Yatzu LaDerech), Twersky, 1950
- The Magic Chain (Sharsheret HaKesamim), Newmann, 1952
- The Winding Path (BaShvil HaMitpatel), Twersky, 1955
- Kushi and Nushi, Massada, 1955[Kushi Ve- Nushi]
- The Secret Circle (BeMa`agal HaStarim), Dvir Li- Yladim, 1955
- Home (Habaita), Am Oved, 1960
- Stories for Nivi (Sipurim LeNivi), Massada, 1962
- Grandma's Dove (HaYonah Shel Savta), Massada, 1963
- The Daughter (HaBat), Massada, 1966
- Nunu, Twersky, 1967
- Towers in Jerusalem (Migdalim B`Yerushalayim), Massada, 1968
- Diligent Girls (Yeladot Harutzot), Yizre`el, 1968
- Operation 52 (Mivtzah 52), Massada, 1971
- Michali (Michali), Massada,1974
- Really? (BeEmet?), Sifriat Poalim, 1978
- Fire Chariot (Rechev Esh), Lichtenfeld-Bronfman, 1979
- Tantan Comes to Visit (Tantan Ba LeHitareah), Massada, 1979
- Muki is Angry with Mum (Muki BeRogez Al Ima), Massada, 1980
- Grandma's Teddy Bear Goes North (Duby Shel Savta Yotze LaTzafon), Sifriat Poalim, 1982
- Three Diligent Girls (Shalosh Yeladot Harutzot), Domino, 1983
- Hello Grandma, It's Me Talking (Hallo Savta, Zo Ani Medaberet), Keter, 1984
- Daddy's Paratrooper Boots (Na`alei HaTzanhanim Shel Aba), Lichtenfeld, 1984
- Mommy I'm Bored! (Ima, Mesha`amem Li!), Keter, 1986
- Grandma Wears Sportwear (Savta Be Training), Massada, 1988
- You Will Not Leave Me at Home (Oti Lo tashiru BaBait), Keter, 1988
- Little Fibs (Shkarim Ktanim), Keter, 1990
- Who Kidnapped Boaz? (Mi Hataf Et Boaz?) Keter, 1992
- Stories for Roee (Sipurim LeRoee), Keter, 1993
- Yemima Avidar-Tchernovitz's Big Book (HaSefer HaGadol Shel Yemima Avidar-Tchernovitz), Am Oved, 1995
- Grandma Left Through the Windows (Savta Yatza MeHaHalonot), Keter, 1997

=== Translated books ===
- Kindergarten Songs (Gan-Gani) – English: Tel Aviv, Twersky, 1957
- The Daughter: The Diary of an Israeli Girl – English: Ramat Gan, Massada Press, 1969
- Home! – Spanish: Buenos Aires, Editorial Israel, 1961
- One of Our Own – Spanish: Buenos Aires, Editorial Israel, 1953
- Two Friends on the Road – Russian: Jerusalem, Aliya, 1993

== Personal life ==
She was married to the Haganah commander Yosef Avidar.

== See also ==
- List of Israel Prize recipients
