= Yosef Avidar =

Israeli diplomat (1906–1995)

- יוסף אבידר
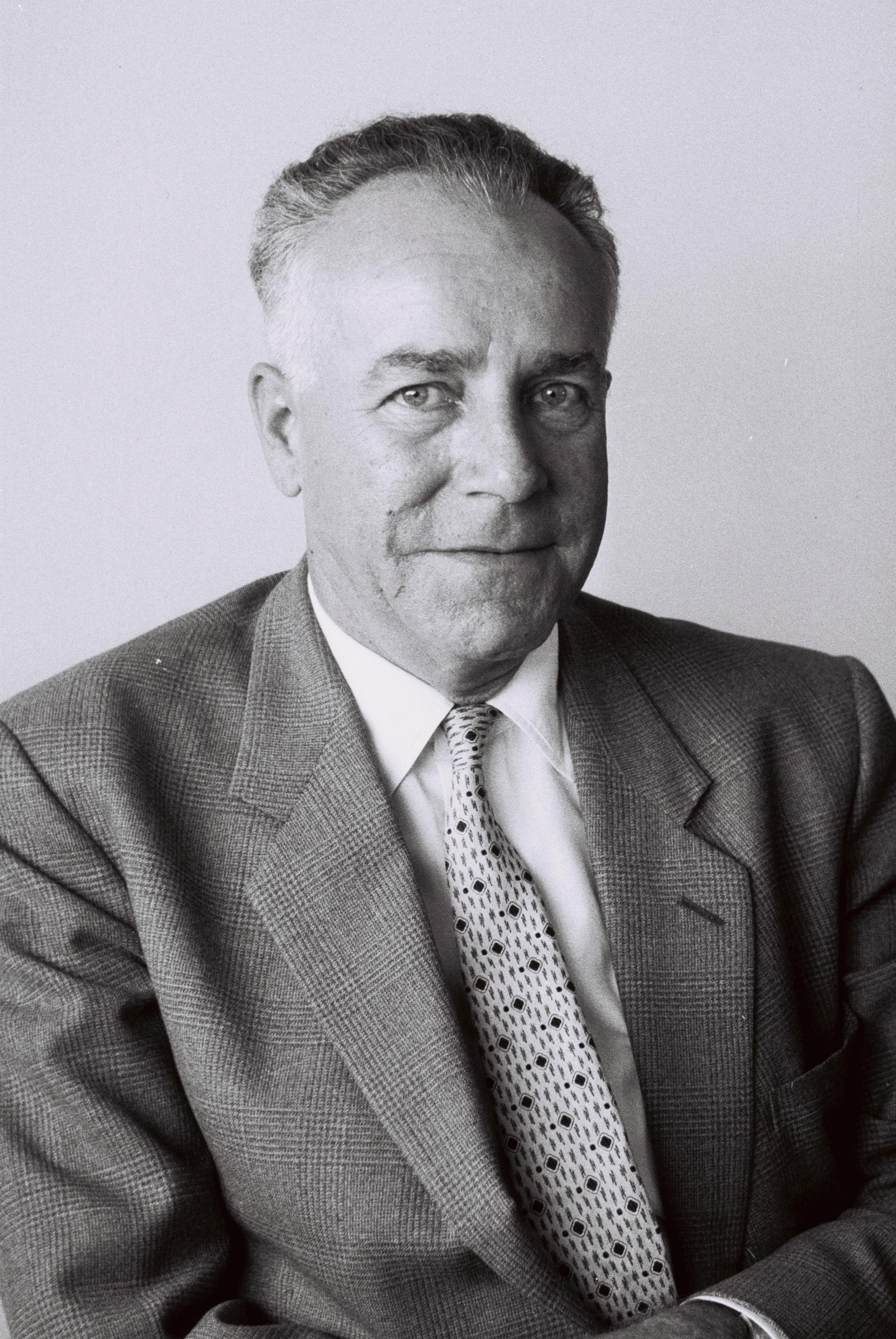
- Avidar in 1960
- Born: Yosef Rochel; 7 May 1906; Kremenets, Russian Empire
- Died: 13 September 1995 (aged 89); Israel
- Spouse: Yemima Avidar-Tchernovitz

Yosef Aluf Avidar (Hebrew: יוסף אבידר; 7 May 1906 – 13 September 1995) was an Israeli statesman, Haganah commander, author and ambassador to Argentina and the Soviet Union.

== Early life ==
Avidar was born on 7 May 1906 as Yosef Rochel in Kremenets in the Russian Empire and in what is now modern-day Ukraine. His father was Joshua Rochel; his mother, Shprinza. Avidar was a peddler during his time in Ukraine.

In 1929 Avidar immigrated to Mandatory Palestine.

== Career ==
Avidar became a senior commander in a Jewish paramilitary organization called the Haganah. Placed in control of the supply programs, he was responsible for the idea and of constructing an underground ammunition factory called the Ayalon Institute, which was a major supplier of arms to the Haganah.

In 1948, after the creation of the Israel Defense Forces, he changed his name from Rochel to Avidar based on an acronym of his two daughters' names. Avidar was the Israeli quartermaster during the 1948 Arab–Israeli War and later served as the Israel Defense Forces' deputy chief of staff. After the war, he served as ambassador to the Soviet Union from 1955 to 1958 and as ambassador to Argentina from 1961 to 1965.

== Death ==
Avidar died on 13 September 1995 at the age of 89 from a lung infection.

== Personal life ==
Avidar lost his right hand when he was learning how to use grenades, and was given the nickname "the amputee". He was sent to Vienna for treatment, where he met the future Israeli children's book author and later wife Yemima Avidar-Tchernovitz, who at the time was studying at the University of Vienna.

He received a Doctor of Philosophy in Russian studies from the Hebrew University of Jerusalem.

== Works ==
- BaDerekh l'Tsahal, 1971
- Avidar, Yosef (1985). The party and the army in the Soviet Union. University Park: Pennsylvania State University Press. ISBN 978-0-271-00393-1. OCLC 11573730.
