= Tower and Stockade =

Settlement method used by Zionist settlers in Mandatory Palestine

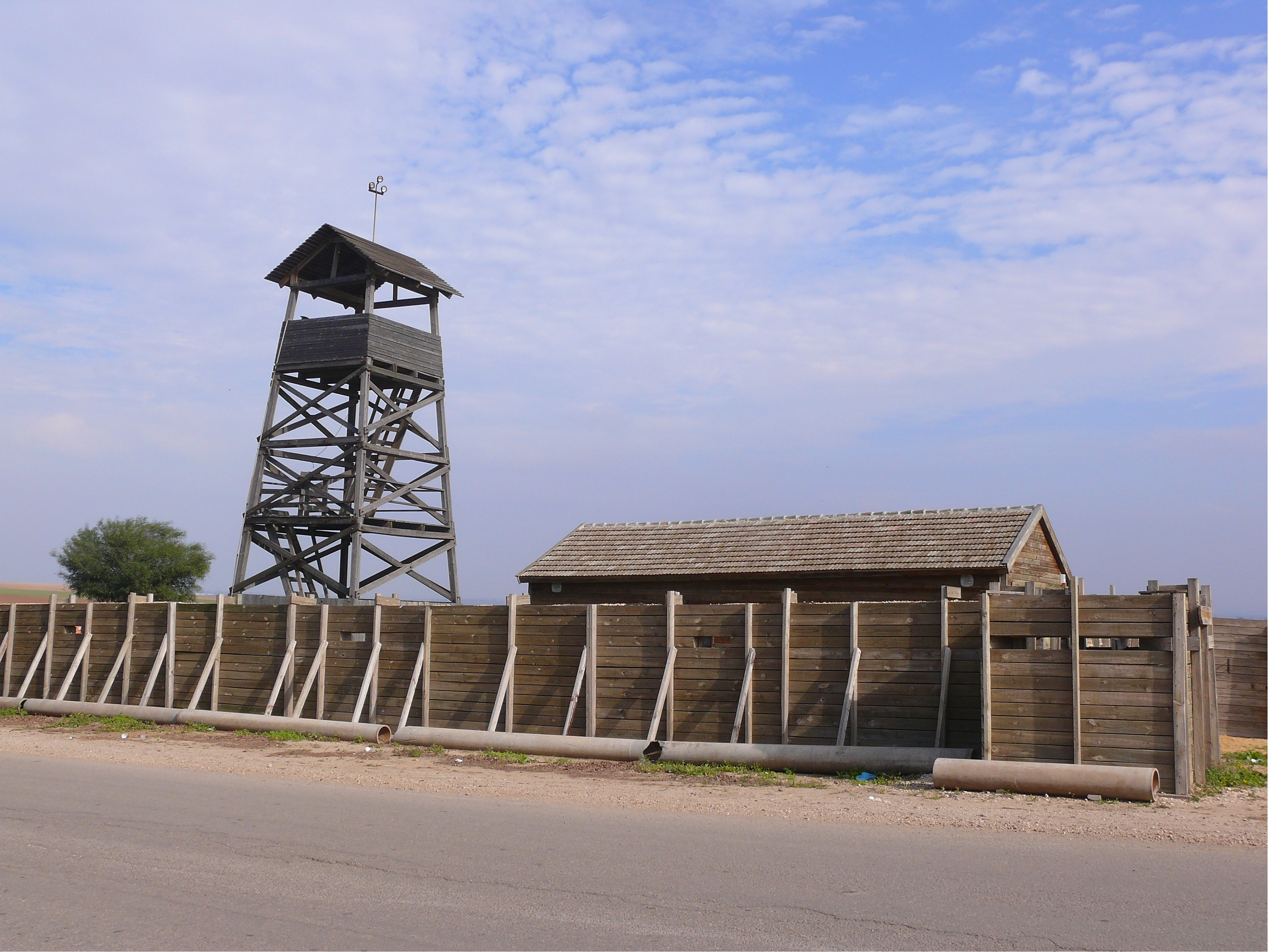
Reconstruction of tower and stockade in Kibbutz Negba

Tower and Stockade (Hebrew: חוֹמָה וּמִגְדָּל, romanized: Ḥoma u'migdal, lit. 'wall and tower') was a settlement method used by Zionist settlers in Mandatory Palestine during the 1936–1939 Arab Revolt. The establishment of new Jewish settlements was legally restricted by the Mandatory authorities, but the British generally gave their tacit accord to the Tower and Stockade actions as a means of countering Arab rioters. During the course of the Tower and Stockade campaign, some 57 Jewish settlements including 52 kibbutzim and several moshavim were established throughout the country. The legal base was a Turkish Ottoman law that was still in effect during the Mandate period, which stated that buildings erected in one night didn't require a building permit and couldn't be demolished by authorities.

== Background ==
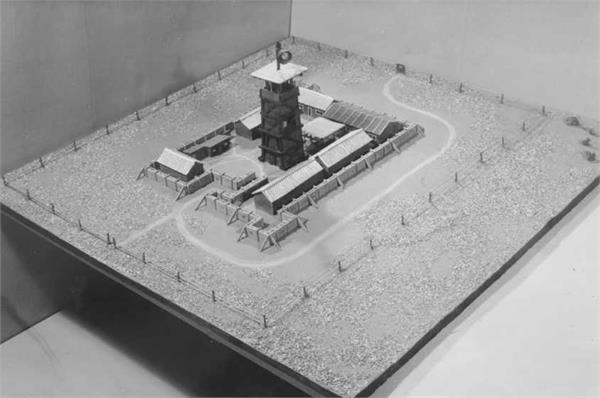
1938 model of Tower and Stockade

During the Arab Revolt, these settlements provided safe havens on land that had been officially purchased by the Jewish National Fund (JNF), protected Jewish populations, particularly in remote areas, on these Jewish-owned land and maintained "facts on the ground." These settlements would eventually be transformed into fortified agricultural settlements, and served for security purposes (as defences against Arab raiders) as well as creating contiguous Jewish-populated regions, which would later help determine the borders of the UN-proposed Jewish state. The operation was run by the Haganah and led by Moshe Sharett. All of the major settlement groups (mostly the kibbutz and moshav movements) took part in the campaign, which consisted of setting up a protected perimeter, with a defensive wall around it and a guard tower in the middle. While many of these settlements were not officially approved by the British Mandate authorities, existing settlements were not dismantled, based on the Turkish Ottoman law still valid at the time. Due to the threat of immediate attack, at least as much as to any need to comply with the clauses of this law, the construction of the Tower and Stockade settlements had to be finished very quickly, usually in the course of a single day. What is less well known is the fact that the British authorities were rather lax at implementing restrictions against such Jewish activities at a time when their main security concern was the Arab revolt, thus "Tower and Stockade" settlements were always created by day, not by night - against some still prevailing myths. In the very different political and security climate of the final months of the Mandate, a similar act of creating facts on the ground happened in April 1948 at Bror Hayil, when much of the work was indeed done during the night.

The invention of the "Tower and Stockade" system is attributed to Shlomo Gur, founding member of Kibbutz Tel Amal (now Nir David), and was developed and encouraged by the architect Yohanan Ratner. The system was based on the fast construction of a perimeter wall from pre-fabricated wooden moulds, which would be filled with gravel and enclosed with barbed wire fencing. On average, the enclosed space formed a yard of 35 x 35 metres (1 dunam). Within this protected yard, the pre-fabricated wooden observation tower and the four sheds sheltering the initial 40 settlers were erected. The constructions were located within eyesight of neighbouring settlements and with accessibility for motor vehicles.

A model of a homa u'migdal was constructed for the Land of Israel Pavilion at the 1937 World Exposition in Paris.

57 were constructed between the last days of 1936 and October 1939.

The buildings were prefabricated by Solel Boneh, the construction arm of the Jewish trade union, Histadrut.

In 1940 two more outpost were built in the northern Hula Valley, She'ar Yashuv and Beit Hillel. They, along with nearby Dafna, Dan, and the only later established Nehalim (October 1943), were known as the "Ussishkin Fortresses", named after Menachem Ussishkin, the president of the Jewish National Fund. The initial plan had been to create one "fortress" for each of the six branches of the settlement movement existing at the time. The site designated for a sixth "fortress", today's Kibbutz Snir, was only settled after the 1967 Six-Day War.

Arrival of tower, Sde Nahum 1937

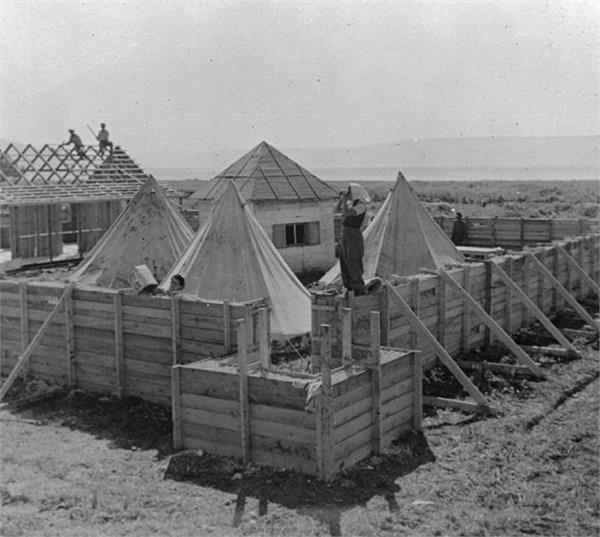
Stockade walls being filled with gravel, Kibbutz Ginosar 1937

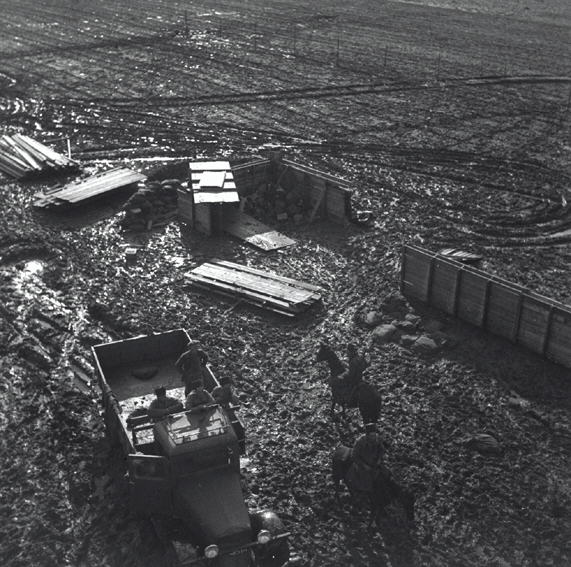
Wall construction, Sde Nahum 1937

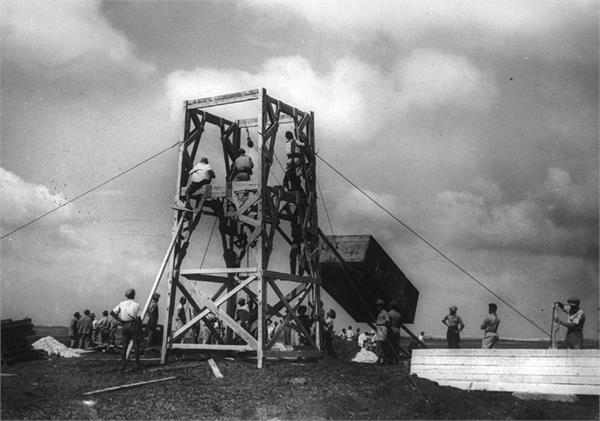
Construction of tower, Tel Yitzhak 1938

== Settlements ==
Tower and Stockade settlements by date of establishment:

- Kfar Hittim, 7 December 1936 (Doesn't use traditional Tower and Stockade method, which is why it isn't truly considered first).
- Tel Amal (now Nir David), 10 December 1936
- Sde Nahum, 5 January 1937
- Sha'ar HaGolan, 31 January 1937
- Masada, 31 January 1937
- Ginosar, 25 February 1937
- Beit Yosef, 9 April 1937
- Mishmar HaShlosha, 13 April 1937
- Tirat Zvi, 30 June 1937
- Moledet (called "Bnei Brit" and "Moledet-Bnei Brit" between 1944-1957), 4 July 1937
- Ein HaShofet, 5 July 1937
- Ein Gev, 6 July 1937
- Maoz Haim, 6 July 1937
- Kfar Menachem, 27 July 1937
- Sha'ar HaNegev (renamed Kfar Szold before it moved altogether to the Galilee in 1942; site resettled in 1944 as Hafetz Haim), 15 August 1937
- Tzur Moshe, 13 September 1937
- Usha, 7 November 1937
- Hanita, 21 March 1938
- Shavei Tzion, 13 April 1938
- Sde Warburg, 17 May 1938
- Ramat Hadar, 26 May 1938
- Alonim, 26 June 1938
- Ma'ale HaHamisha, 17 July 1938
- Tel Yitzhak, 25 July 1938
- Beit Yehoshua, 17 August 1938
- Ein HaMifratz, 25 August 1938
- Ma'ayan Tzvi, 30 August 1938
- Sharona, 16 November 1938
- Geulim, 17 November 1938
- Eilon, 24 November 1938
- Neve Eitan, 25 November 1938
- Kfar Ruppin, 25 November 1938
- Kfar Masaryk, 29 November 1938
- Mesilot, 22 December 1938
- Ayalon (Khirbet Samach), 1 January 1939
- Dalia, 2 May 1939
- Dafna, 3 May 1939, as "Ussishkin Fortress 1" (Alef)
- Dan, 4 May 1939, as "Ussishkin Fortress 2" (Bet)
- Sde Eliyahu, 8 May 1939
- Mahanayim, 23 May 1939
- Shadmot Dvora, 23 May 1939
- Shorashim, 23 May 1939
- Hazore'im, 23 May 1939
- Tel Tzur (now Moshav Nahalat Jabotinsky in Binyamina), 23 May 1939
- Kfar Glikson, 23 May 1939
- Ma'apilim, 23 May 1939
- Mishmar HaYam (now Afek), 28 May 1939
- Hamadiyah, 23 June 1939
- Kfar Netter, 26 June 1939
- Negba, 12 July 1939
- Gesher, 13 August 1939
- Beit Oren, 1 October 1939
- Amir, 29 October 1939
- Beit Hillel, 3 January 1940 (sometimes, but not always considered one of the "Ussishkin Fortresses")
- She'ar Yashuv, February 1940, as "Ussishkin Fortress 3" (Gimel)

== Gallery ==
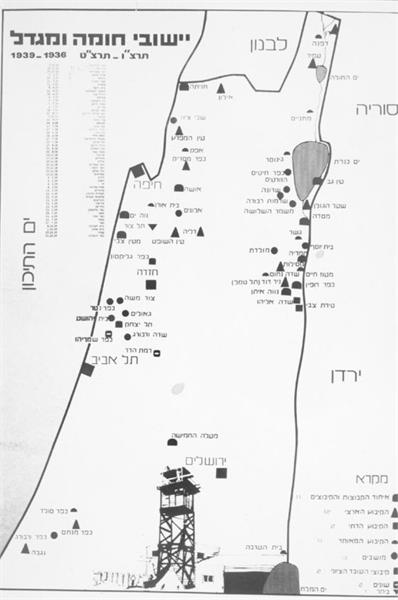
Wall and tower locations 1936-1939

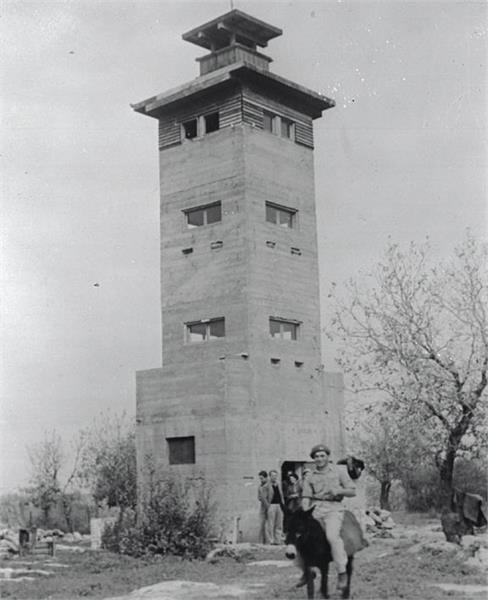
Alonim 1939

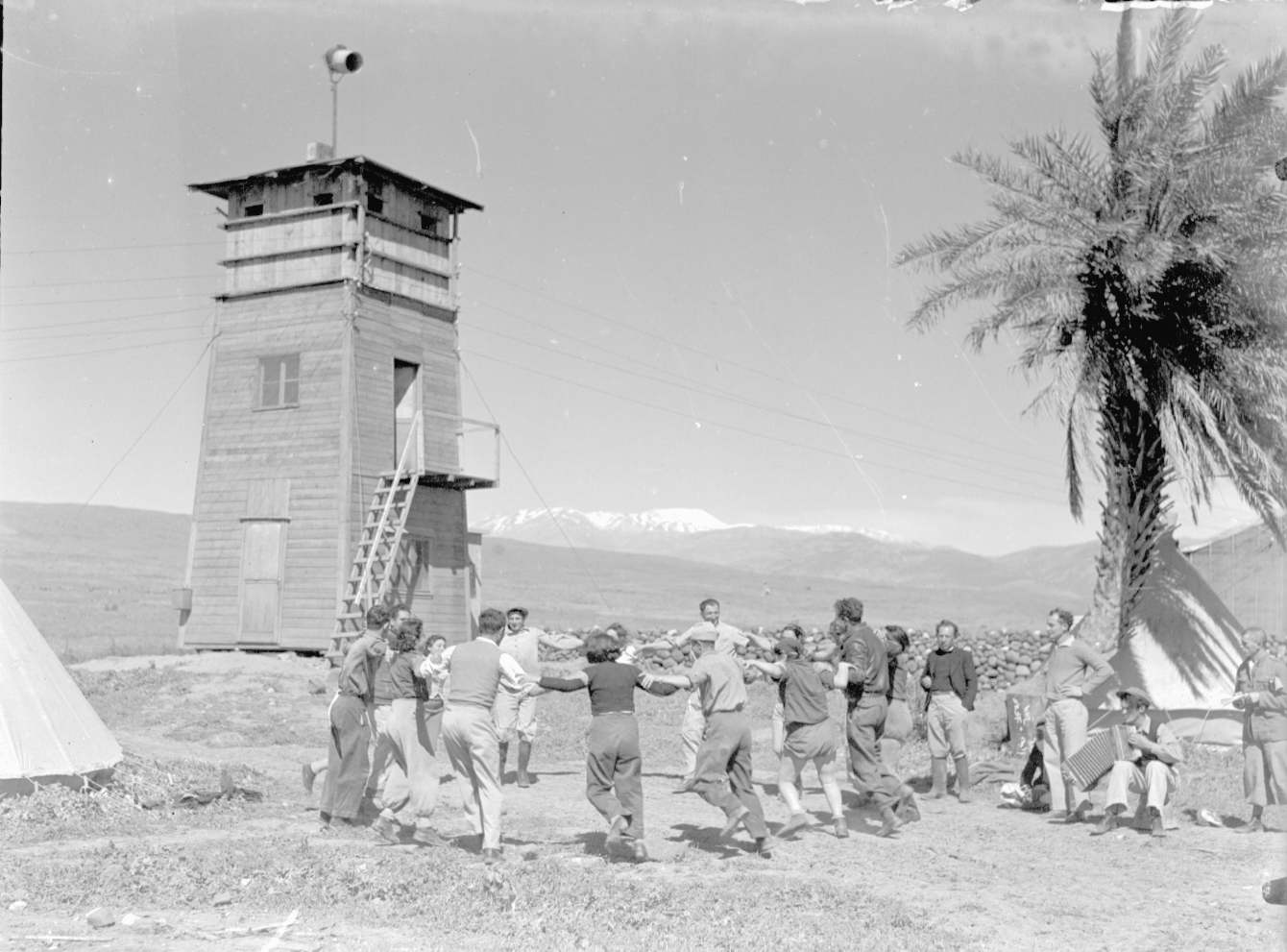
Amir 1940

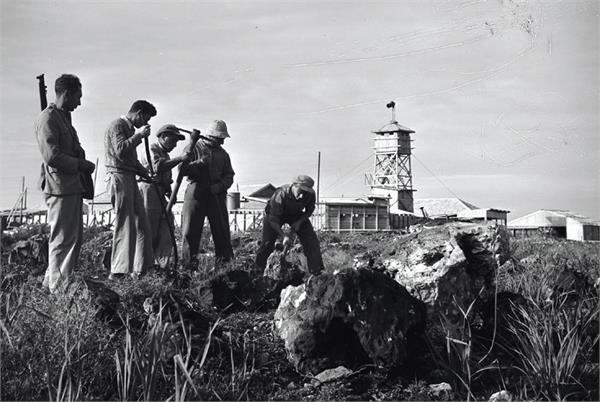
Ayalon under construction. 1939

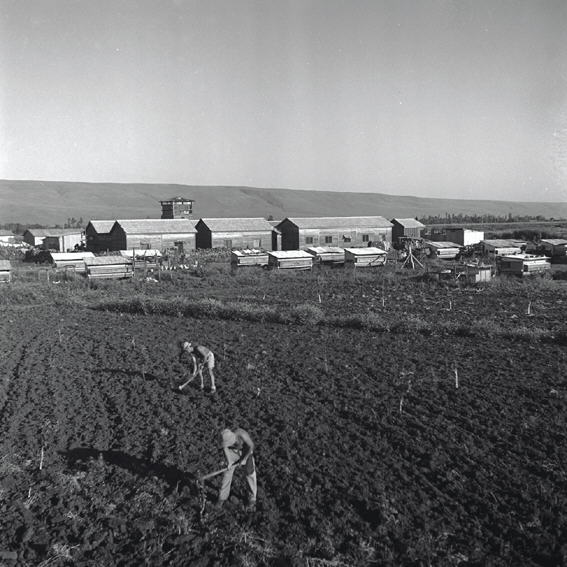
Beit Hillel 1944

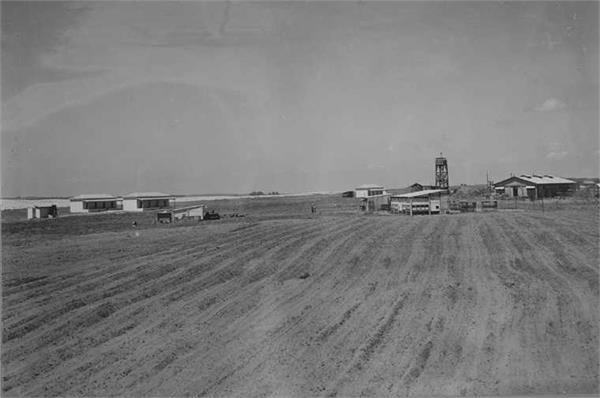
Beit Yehoshua 1939

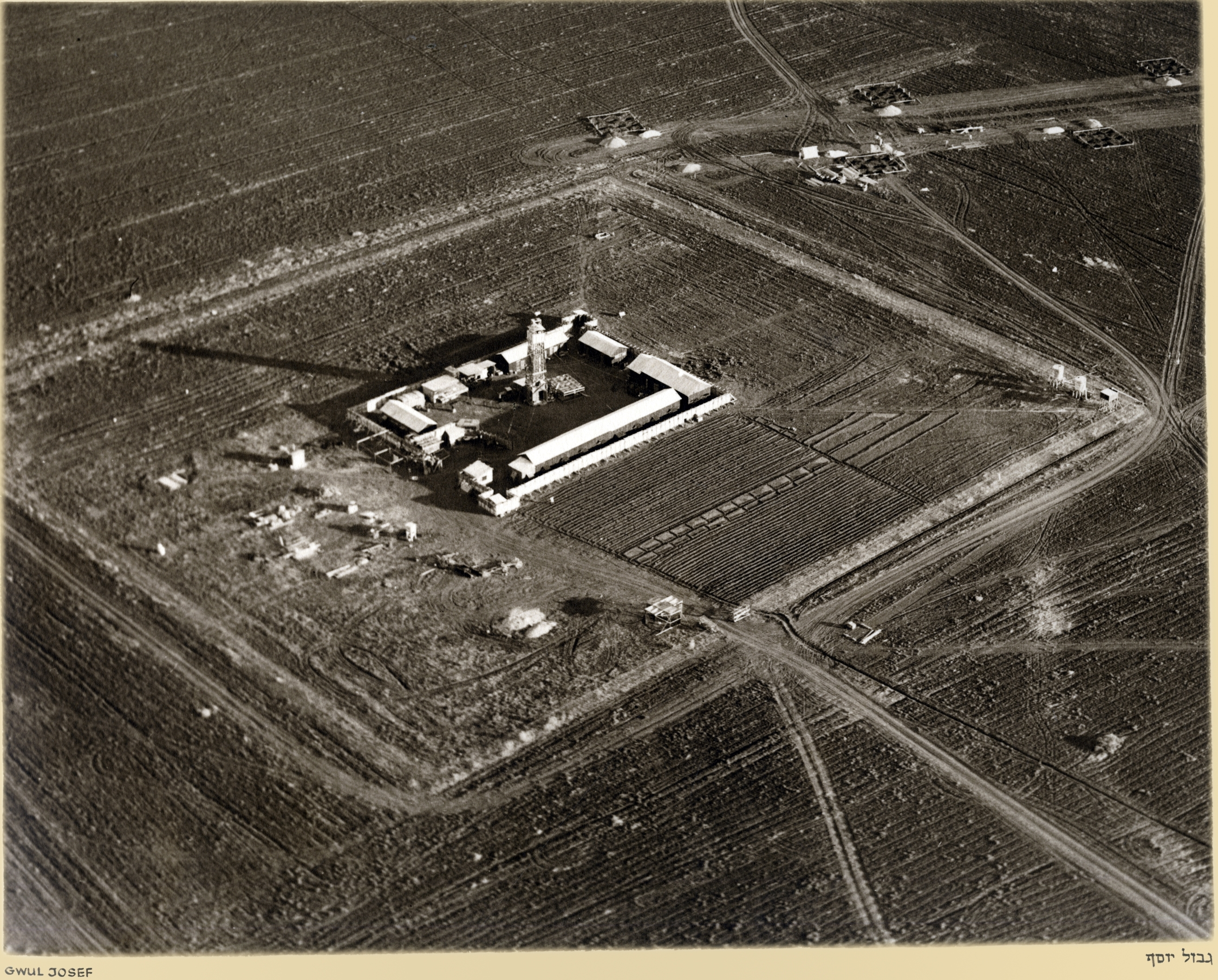
Beit Yosef April 1937

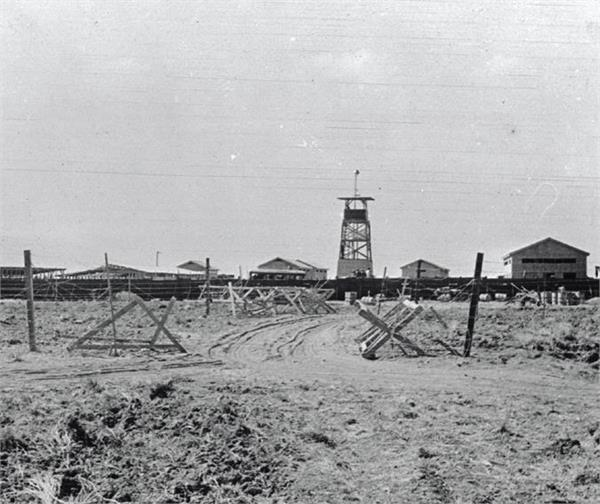
Dafna 1939

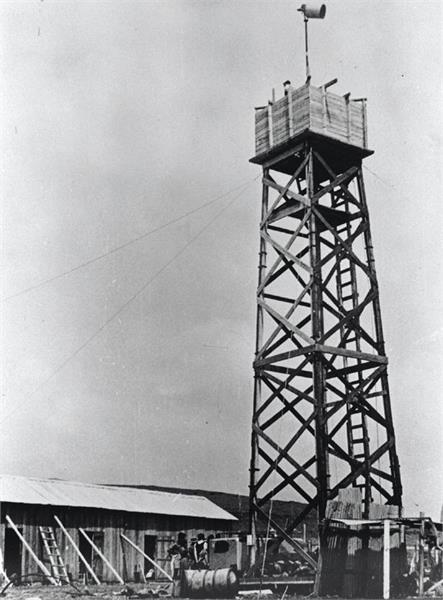
Dan 1940

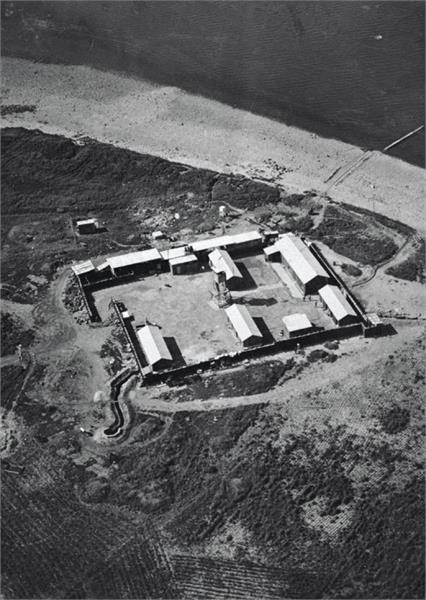
Ein Gev March 1939

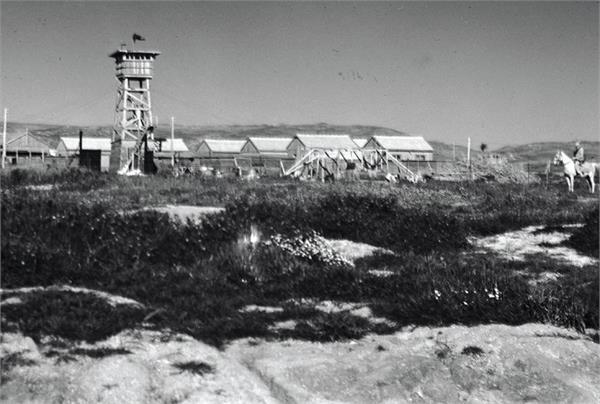
Ein HaMifratz 1939

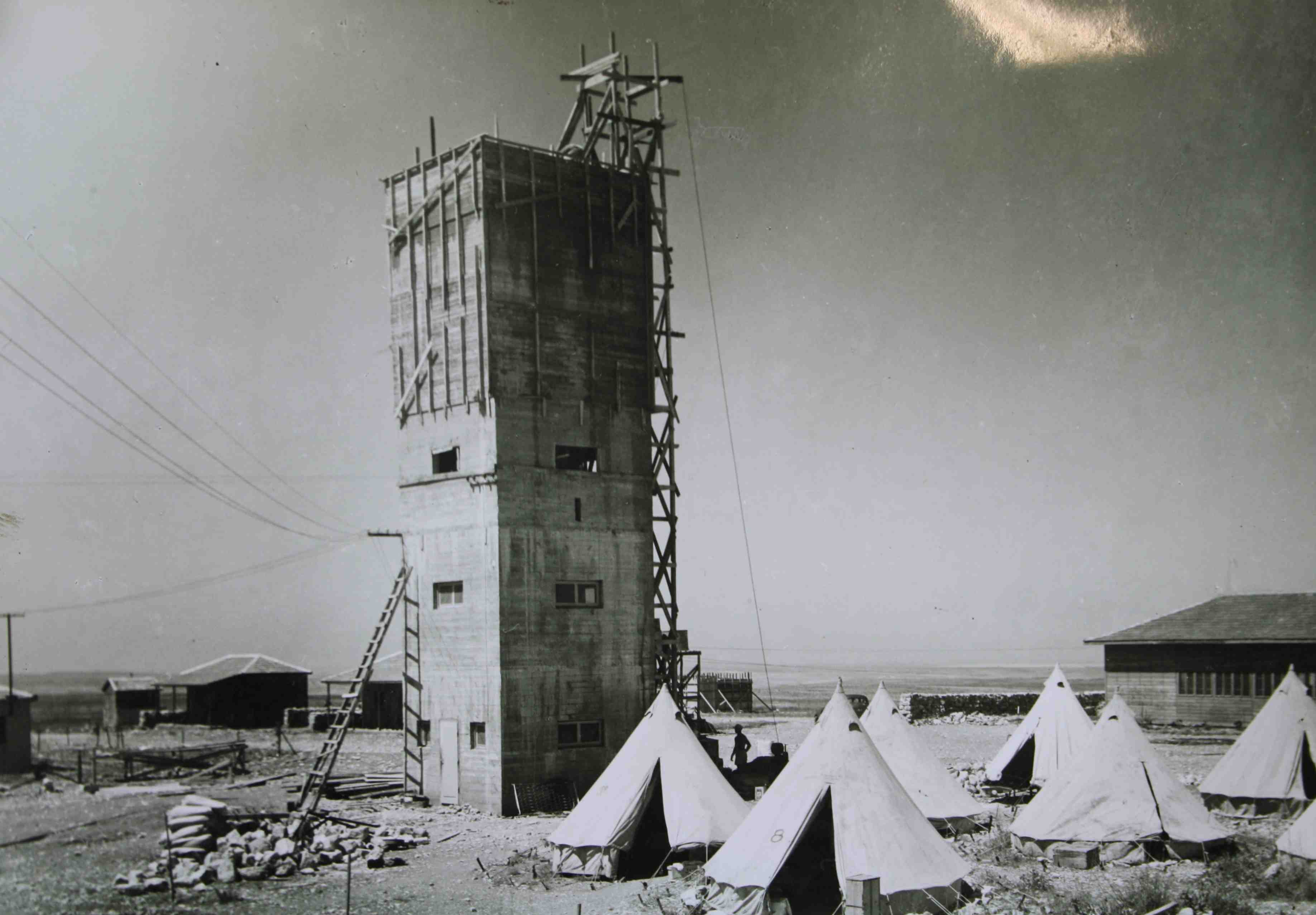
Ein Hashofet 1938

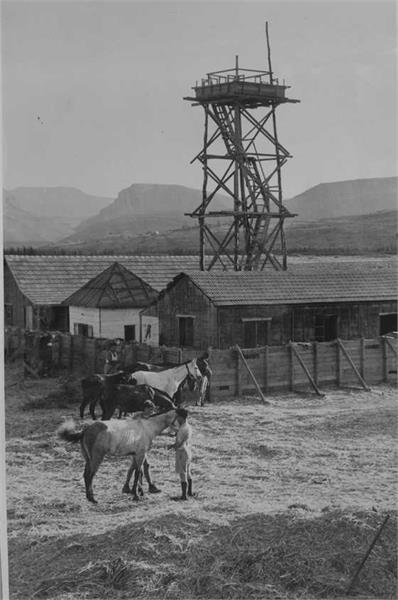
Ginosar 1937

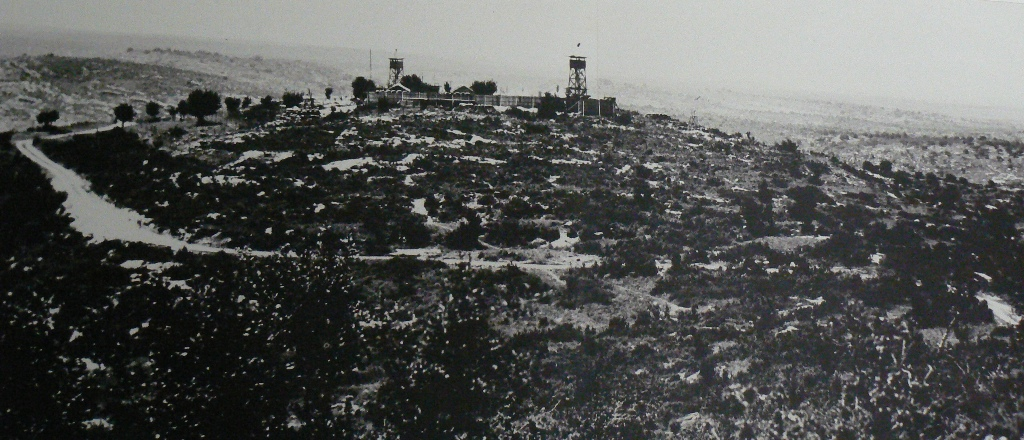
Hanita 1938

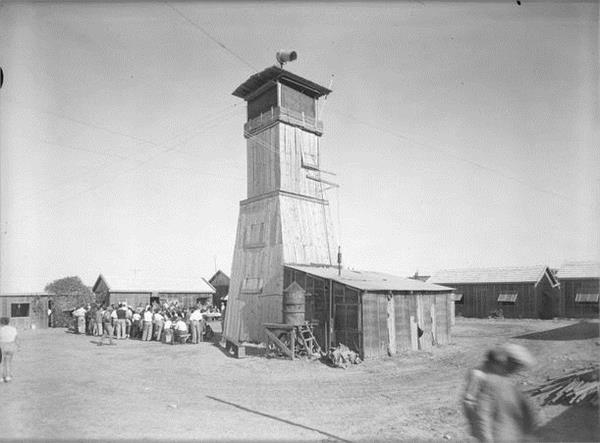
Kfar Menahem 1937

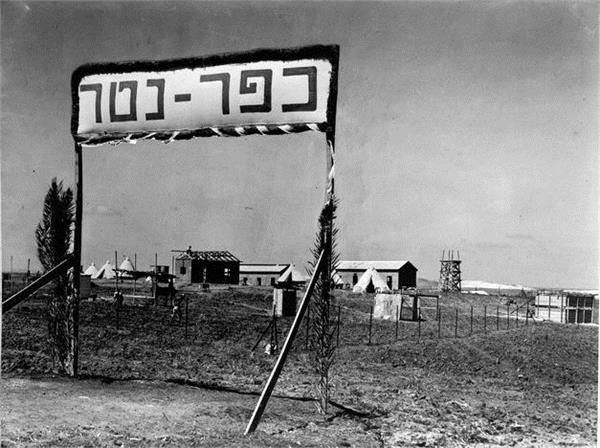
Kfar Netter 1939

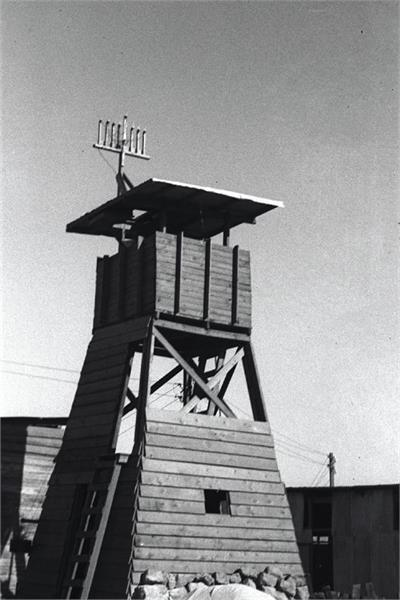
Kfar Ruppin 1938

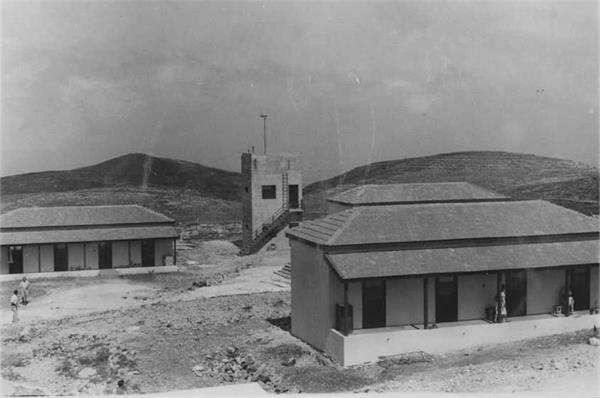
Ma'ale HaHamisha 1939

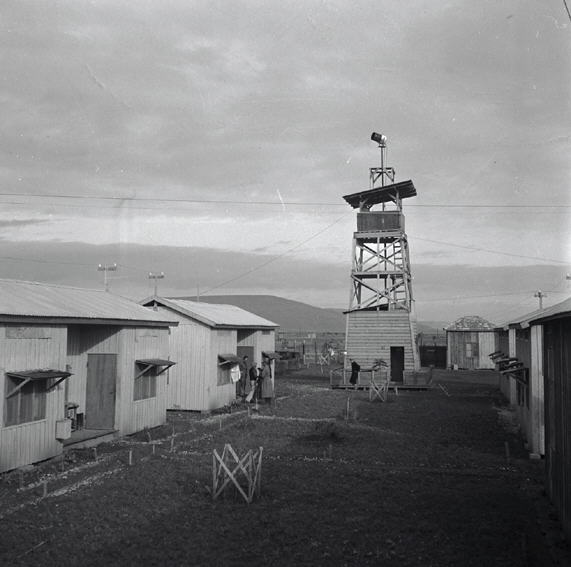
Maoz Haim 1938

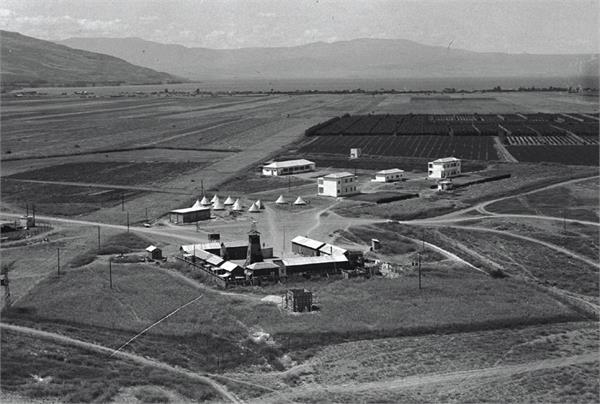
Masada 1939

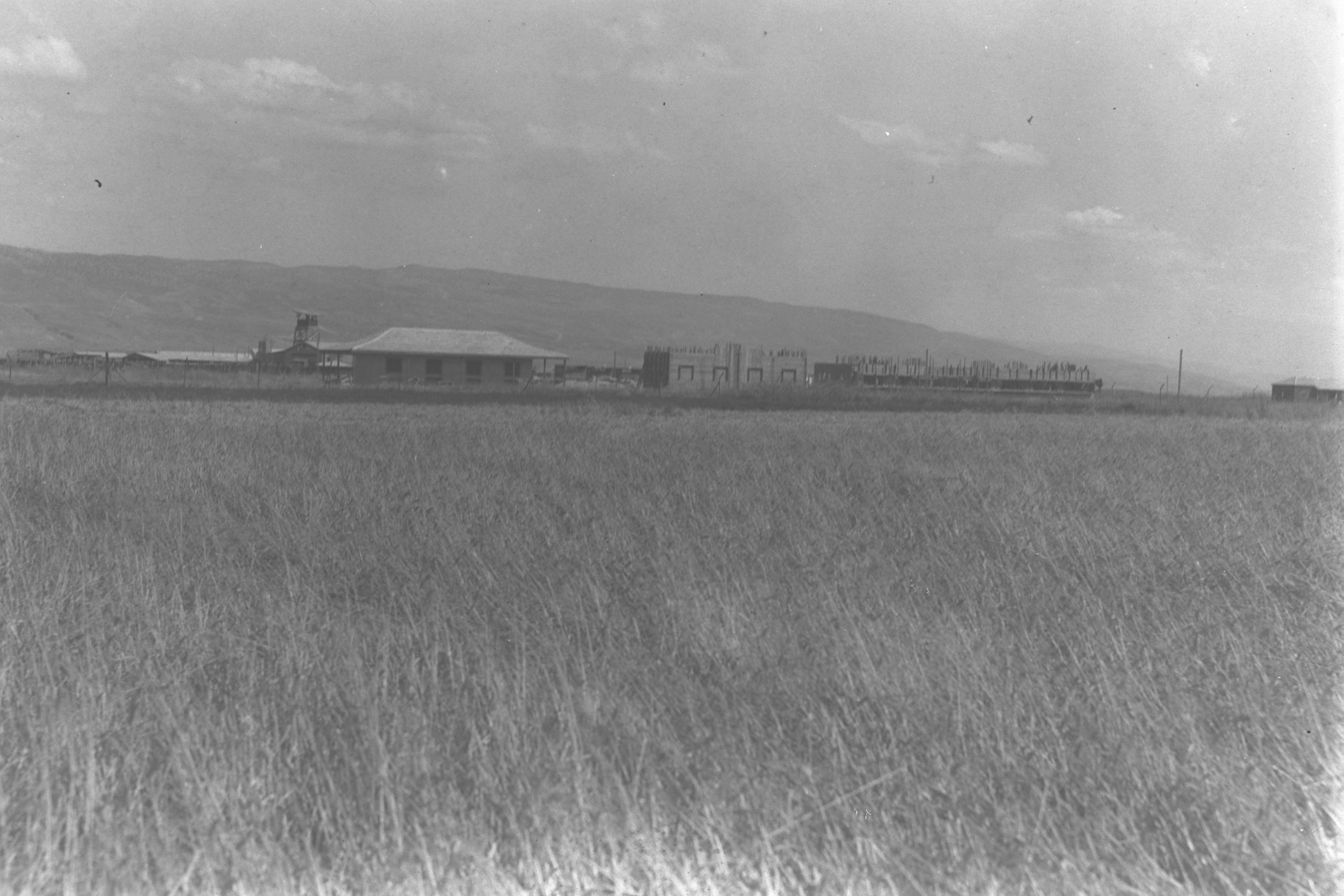
Mesilot 1939

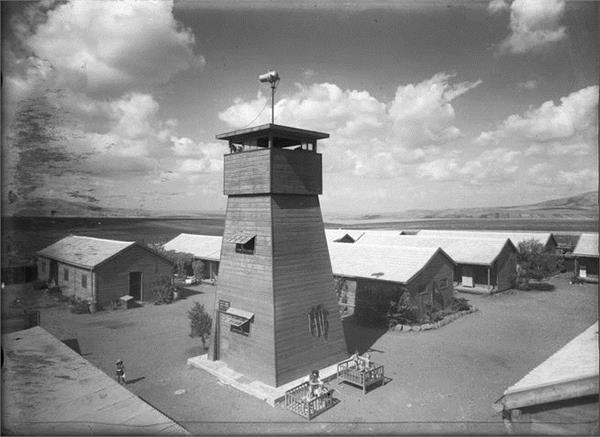
Moledet 1941

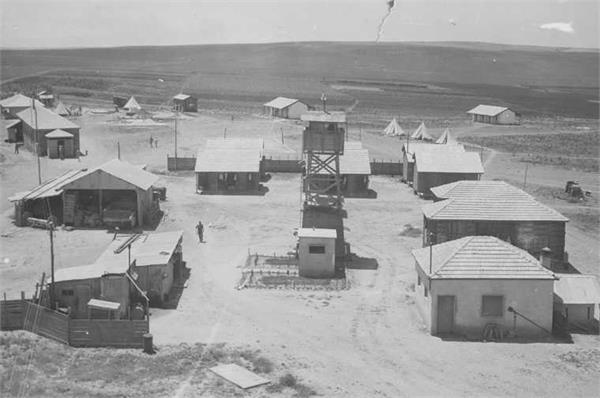
Negba 1942

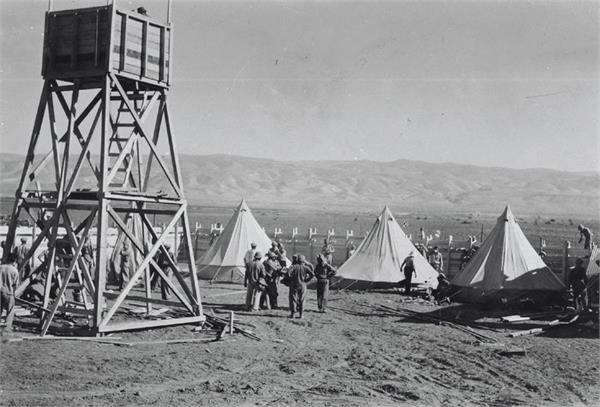
Neve Eitan 1938

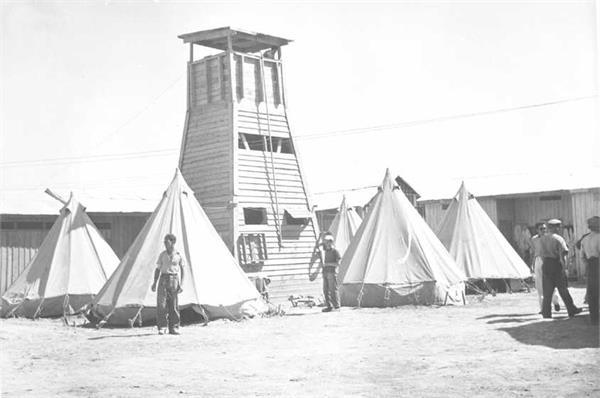
Sde Nahum 1939

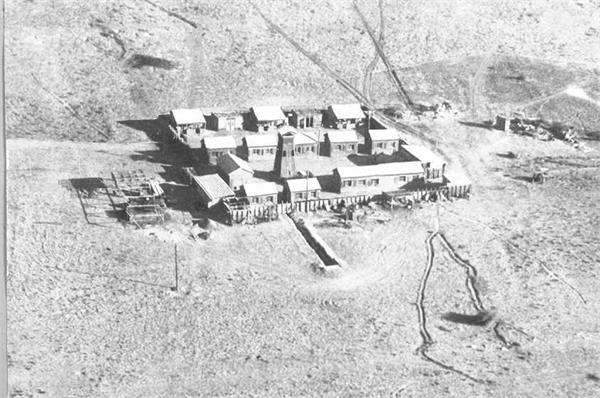
Shaʽar HaGolan 1937

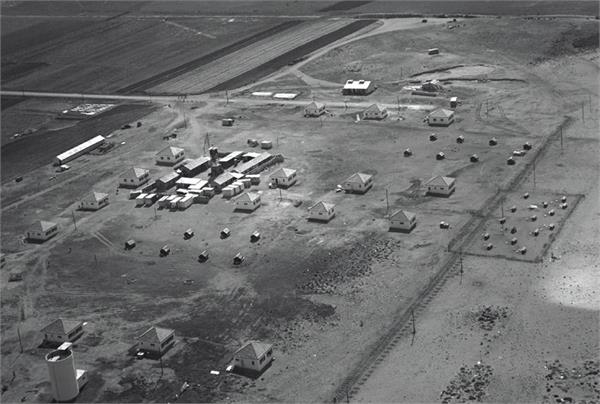
Shavei Tzion 1939

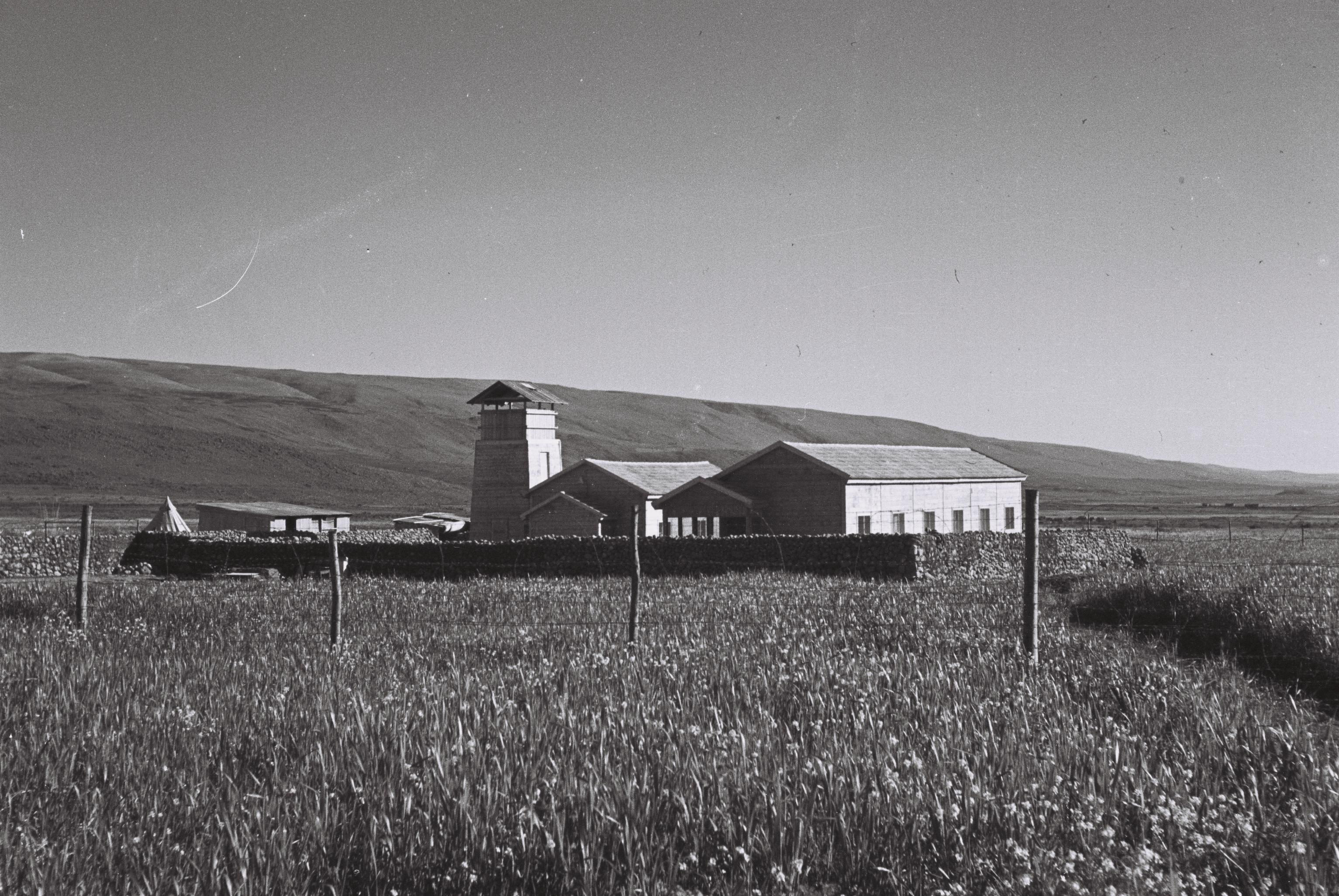
She'ar Yashuv 1940

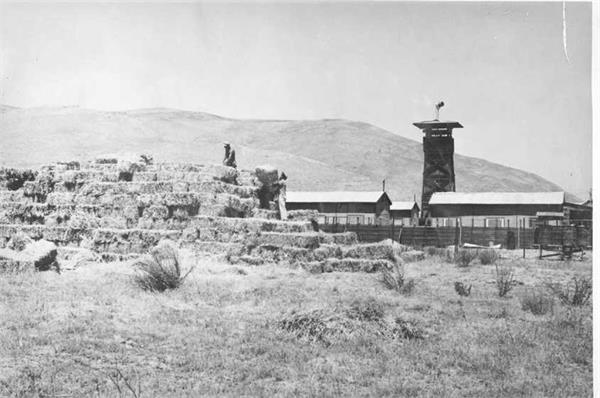
Tel Amal 1937

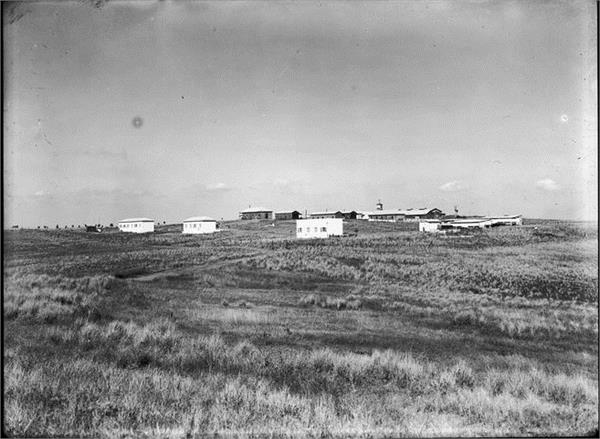
Tel Yitzhak 1939

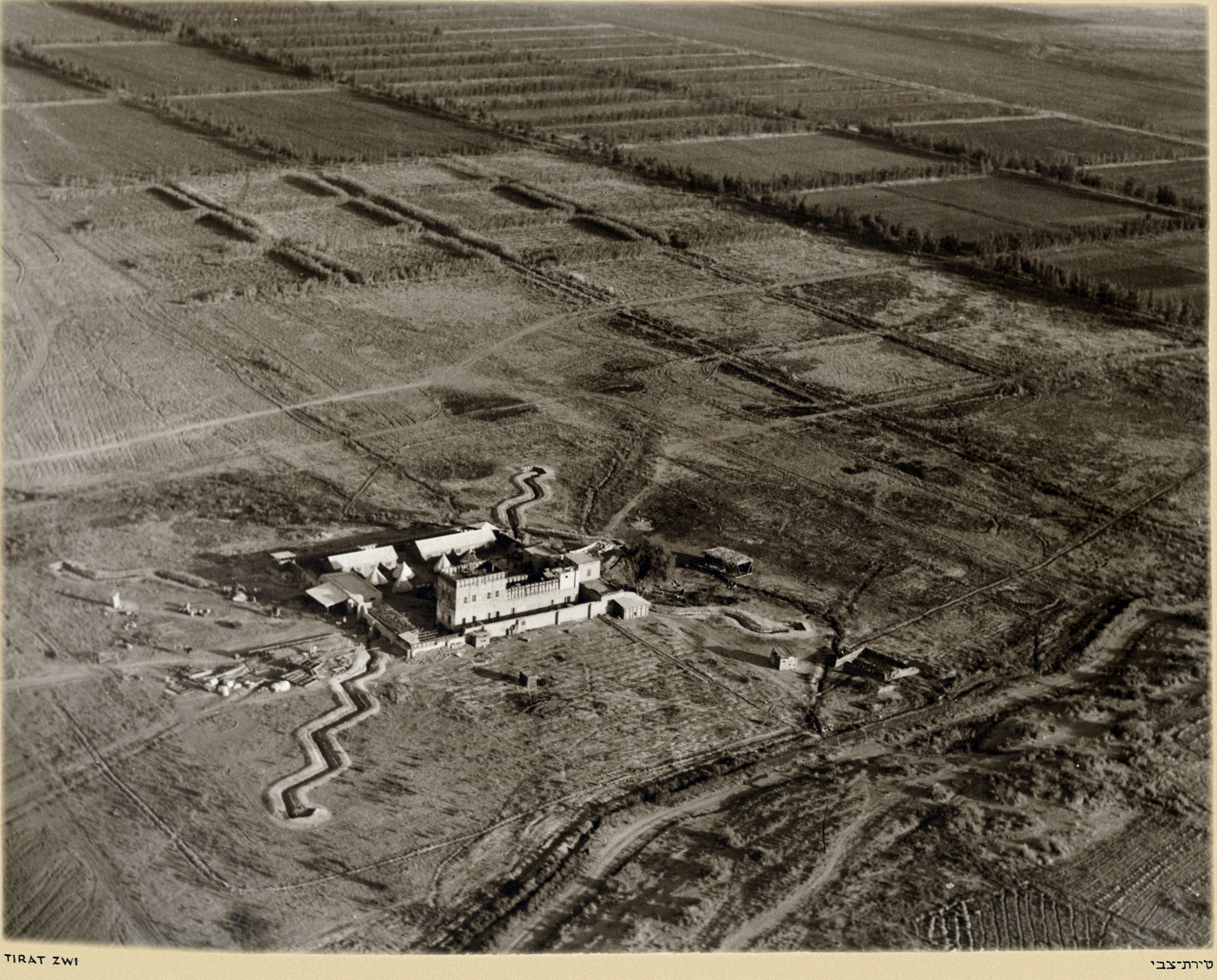
Tirat Zvi 1937

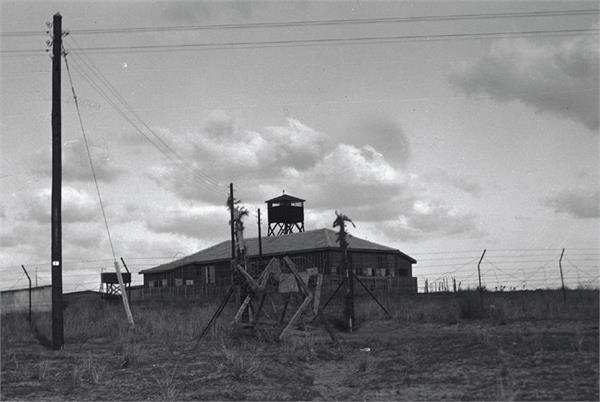
Tzur Moshe 1940

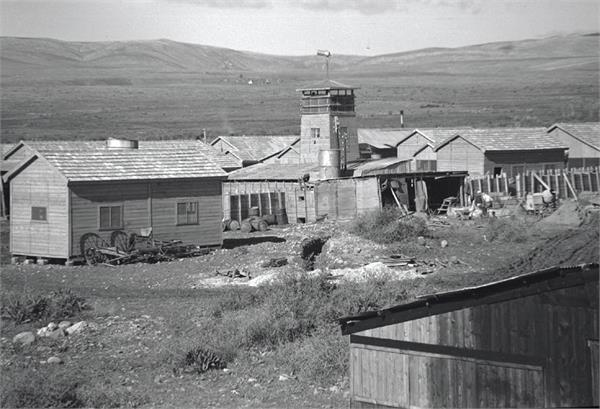
Ussishkin D 1940

== See also ==
- Three lookouts (in the Negev), 1943 settlements, created as advanced positions in southern Palestine/northern Negev
- 11 points in the Negev, 1946 settlements created prior to the partition of Palestine
- Settlement of the Thousand, two plans (1926 and 1932) to settle Jewish families on farms in Mandate Palestine
- Tegart fort, British police and border forts built during the 1930s Arab revolt
- Gecekondu, legal loophole in modern Turkey allowing for permit-free night-time building
