= Ayalon Institute =

Historical site in Rehovot, Israel

Coordinates: 31.9160°N 34.8096°E

Machon Ayalon Underground Bullet Factory
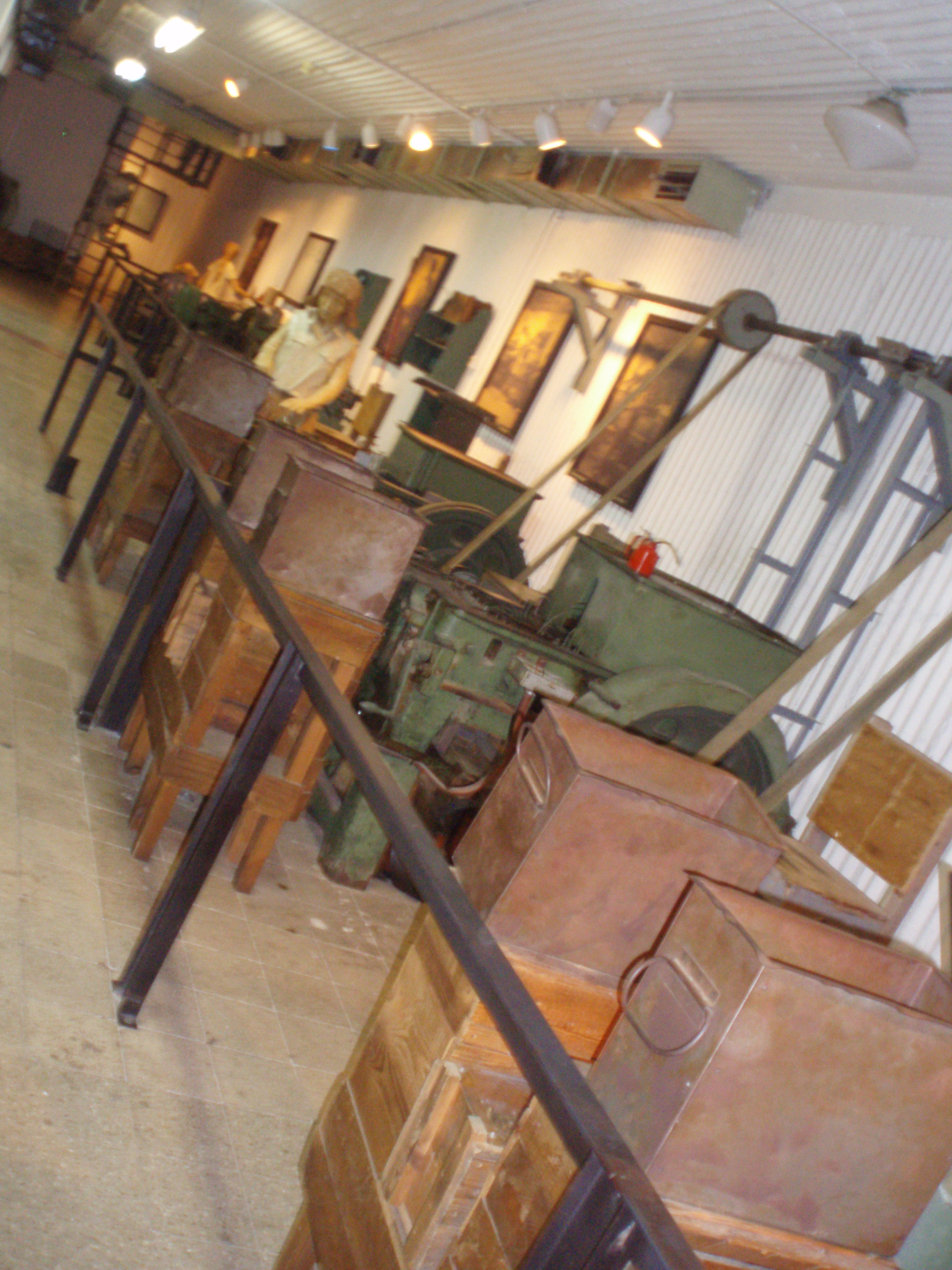
- Established: 1945
- Location: Israel

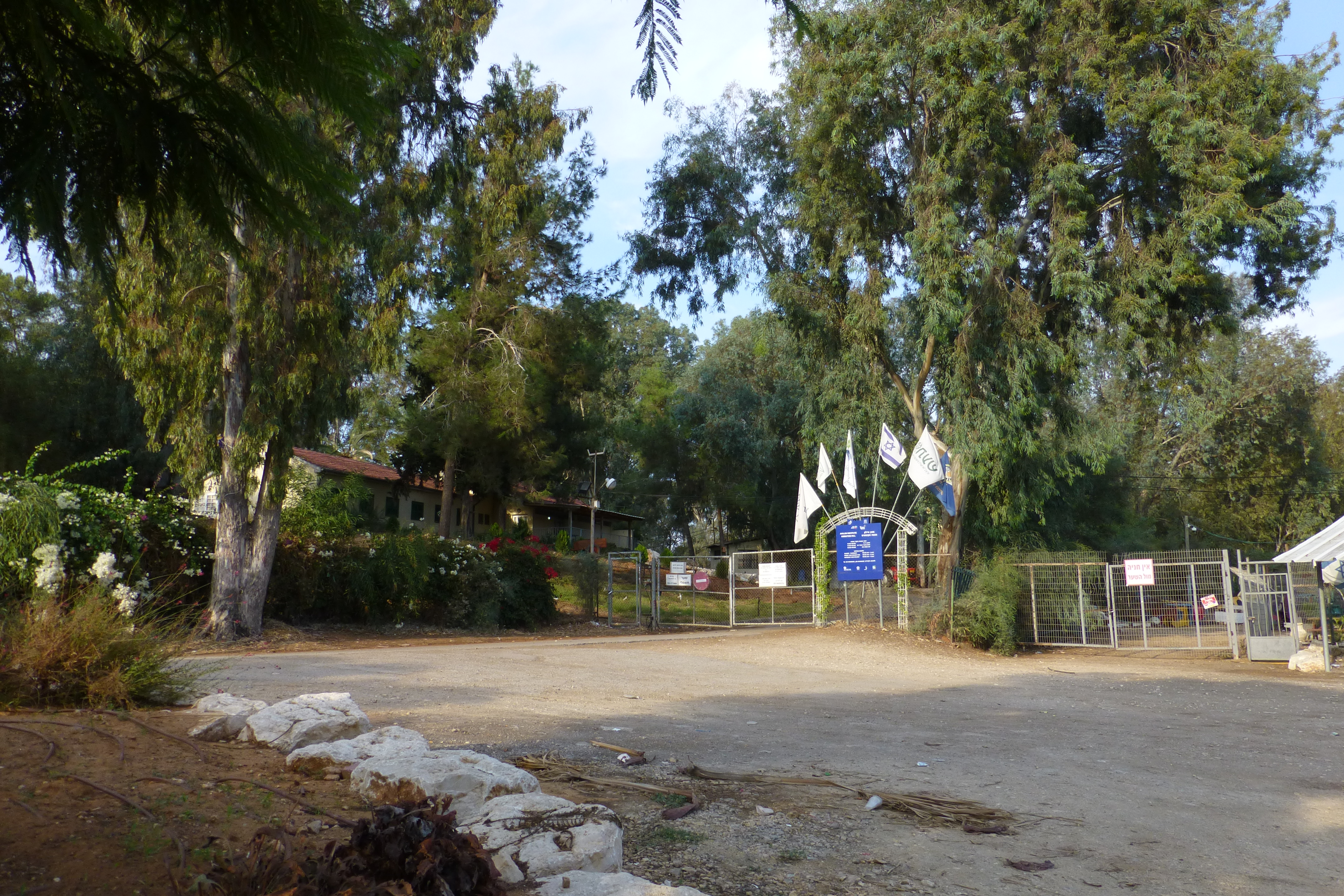
The Ayalon Institute in Rehovot

The Ayalon Institute (Hebrew: מכון איילון, romanized: Makhon Ayalon) was an underground ammunition factory, located on Kibbutz Hill in Rehovot, Israel, disguised as a kibbutz that ran a laundry service. The factory was established in 1945 and manufactured ammunition until 1948; today it is a museum and national historical site. It was "secretly created in less than a month, 8 meters (25 feet) underground and was run by the Haganah".

== History ==
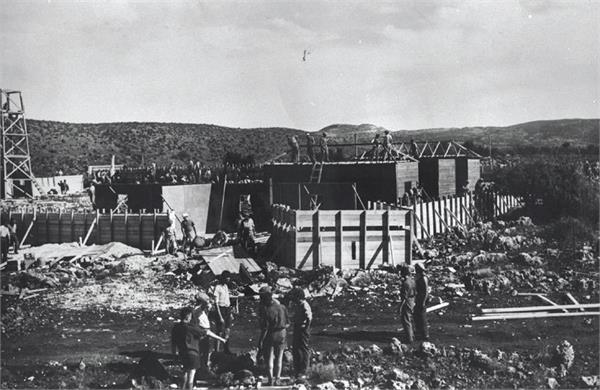
Ayalon, "Tower and Stockade" action: construction of the barracks, 1 January 1939. Photo: Rudi Weissenstein.

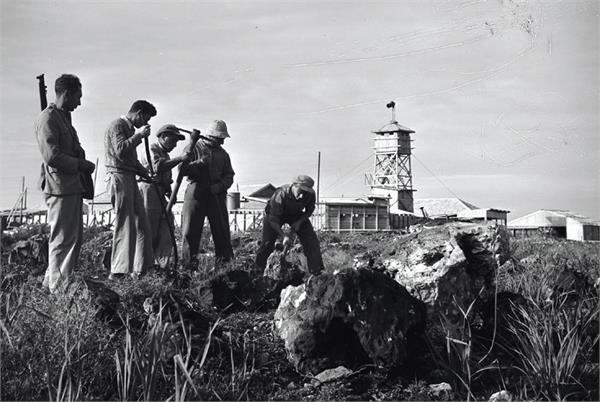
Ayalon, agricultural training, March 1939. Photo: Rudi Weissenstein.

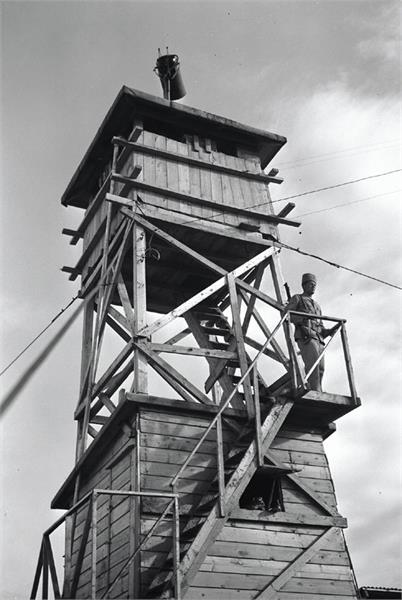
Ayalon (Khirbet Samach), watch tower, 1 January 1939. Photo: Rudi Weissenstein.

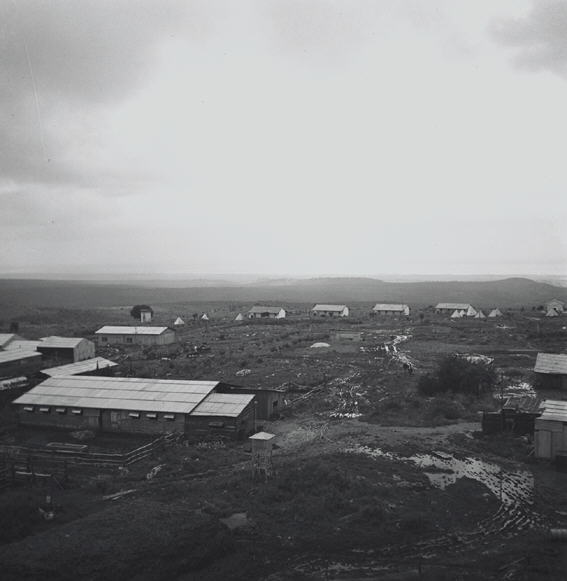
Ayalon 1943

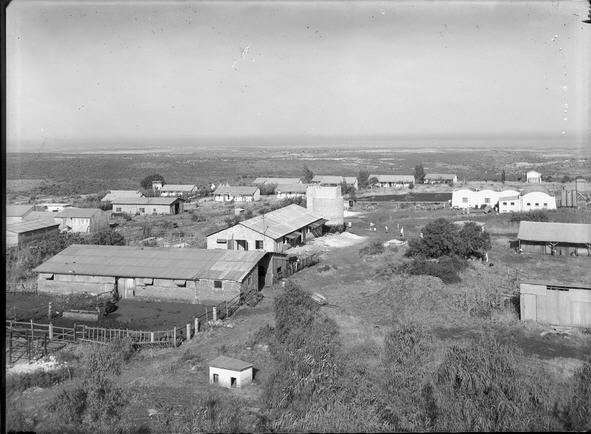
Ayalon 1946

=== "Tower and Stockade" action ===
In January 1939, during the Arab revolt, a "Tower and Stockade"-type position was established at Khirbet Samach on Kibbutz Hill overlooking Rehovot.

=== Cartridge factory ===
In the 1930s, Zionist leaders in then (British) Mandatory Palestine determined that they were going to need weapons to defend themselves and to fight for their independence. Plans to smuggle weapons and establish clandestine arms factories were developed and implemented. The Sten submachine gun, the personal weapon of the Palmach, was relatively easy to build clandestinely, but the Haganah had difficulty obtaining the 9 mm cartridges needed for the weapons.

The head of the clandestine Israel Military Industries, Yosef Avidar (later head of the Central Command), devised a plan to smuggle in machines for a secret factory to make the ammunition. Twelve machines needed for cartridge production (punching, drilling, cutting brass, etc.) were successfully purchased in Poland in 1938. Because of the international situation at the time, the Zionists could ship the machines only as far as Beirut (Lebanon), where they were stored for nearly four years in a Haganah warehouse. With the help of Jews serving in the British army, the machines were finally brought into Palestine by train.

The site for the future plant, Kibbutz Hill, was a place where pioneers would go for training in kibbutz life before moving on to establish cooperatives around the country. The location had a number of strategic advantages: it was already established as a kibbutz with the British, its location on a hill allowed for obscured buildings and underground construction, and a nearby train station provided reliably strong noise to cover the factory's operation.

The Haganah approached and later recruited an incoming youth group to establish the kibbutz and its associated ammunition factory. The group of 45 teenagers and young adults was responsible for maintaining absolute secrecy, lest they face death sentences at the hands of the British, who had a military base within walking distance of the training facility.

The kibbutz was created on top of the clandestine plant only to disguise the plant from the British military. Not all of the members in the kibbutz were aware that there was a secret underground ammunition factory under their homes, and such people were referred to as "giraffes" by the factory workers, after the transportation method used for giraffes in the Tel Aviv zoo, where the animals were unable to see what was beneath their feet.

The group working in the clandestine factory manufactured some 2.25 million cartridges between 1945 and 1948 – an average of 40,000 per day – right under the noses of the British troops.

== 1948 ==
With independence achieved, Israel no longer had to conceal the factory's operations. Cartridge production was therefore moved above ground, as part of the centralized military industries. The pioneer group of the 45 youngsters decided to stay together and fulfill their original dream to establish a new kibbutz. They did so further north, founding the kibbutz Ma'agan Micha'el by the sea near Zichron Ya'acov in 1949.

== Museum ==
The secret which was so well kept of the underground production only became known to the public in 1975.

Today, Ayalon Institute is a museum. In 1987, the site was restored to preserve and display the kibbutz and the underground factory to the public. It is one of the Israel Heritage Sites. Playing an important role in this, the Jewish National Fund supports ongoing rehabilitation and preservation of the site. For the time being, the venue offers a eucalyptus grove with picnic tables and lodging tents as well as guided tours throughout the remaining buildings and the factory itself. Laurel Fairworth, a United States TV producer, decided in 2015 to create a documentary about the unique place. A shortened version of the docudrama is shown at the museum as an introduction to the guided tours.

The guided tour shows the laundry room and the secret entrance under the washing machine. The tour enters the factory through an alternate entrance – installed for today's visitors – located in the bakery, going down a spiral ladder 25 feet into the ground. The machines are located in the main room, and still function today thanks to a team of engineers from the Society for the Preservation of Israel Heritage Sites. The electricity necessary to run their transmission belts back in the 40s was secretly branched off the train operating site, as testified by a little "thank you for it" sign attached to the wall next to the machines in the museum. The tour also shows the UV-radiation room, the toilets (their content was pumped to the kibbutz's sewage system) as well as the ammunition packing station. It ends with a walk back through the kibbutz facilities, which are relatively well preserved thanks to the military use of the area after independence.

== Factory operations and risks ==
In the impressively short time of three weeks, the hill was dug out and a large underground chamber of 300 square yards (the size of a tennis court) 13 feet (8m) underground with nearly 2-foot-thick (0,5m) concrete walls and ceiling was built. Above, the sort of buildings used in an ordinary kibbutz - dining room, community hall, children's house etc. were erected. Additionally, a laundry and a bakery were constructed. Here, the very detailed plan regarding the factory can be observed at its best: It had to anticipate every possible threat to the endeavour of establishing a secret ammunition plant. Everything had to be foreseen. An entrance was needed for workers to enter the factory, as well as an opening to lower into it the necessary heavy machines. The question of ventilation was vital, as were plausible cover stories for the workers. These solutions were found: The big hole used to lower the machines was covered by the 10-ton oven of the bakery, while rails to move it were even embedded in concrete to avoid any ray of light. The chimney of the bakery became part of the ventilation system. Its counterpart – one to get fresh air in, the other one to bring the gases and exhaust air out – was hidden in the technical system of the laundry. Its automated industrial washing machine was movable as well and hid the secret entrance to the underground factory.

The washing machine which covered the noise and smell of the factory was in use constantly, and the kibbutz members' clothes were washed so often that they became ragged. To solve this problem the kibbutz opened a laundry service. Surrounding kibbutzim sent their linens to be washed for a small fee. Even the British brought their uniforms to be taken care of. To distance the British personnel, the kibbutz extended its laundry service by a delivery service. Another severe problem, to get all of the brass necessary for the bullets, was solved as well in a smart move: The kibbutz members told the British that they operated a little beauty business producing cases for kosher lipsticks. The British accepted the stated purpose of the side business – which was reinforced by gifts from the Jews of lipstick cases to British officials – and let the kibbutz operate.

Downstairs, forty-five women and men worked in the bullet factory for three years. They worked in two shifts to punch brass, bend and lumber it, cut it to size, fill it with gunpowder and finalise each cartridge by installing a primer (produced elsewhere). Following a strict procedure and control panel for each step of production, the workers strove to avoid injury or worse. Amazingly, at a place were more than 2 million cartridges were filled by hand with gunpowder, the most severe injury was a cut-off fingertip. Since the gunpowder smuggled into the factory was sometimes of poor quality, the workers even had a testing facility underground. To make sure the ammunition was safe and effective, they randomly sampled bullets and shot them in the underground testing room at targets to check for accuracy and precision. Each day, at the precise moment when the train passed by, they were able to use the noise of its passage to disguise their test firing.

Every day the factory workers would go underground very early, and in a span of less than three minutes to avoid detection. Though the air was exchanged six times per hour, there was no air conditioning, and particularly on hot days work conditions were hard. (At temperatures above 40 °C the danger of spontaneous ignition of the gunpowder stopped the production.) Lack of sunlight paled the skin of the workers, putting their cover stories (of working in the fields) at stake and increasing their risk of illness due to lack of vitamin D. According to the recommendation of a medical doctor, additional food was organised for the workers, and a UV lamp was installed underground to tan their skin to avoid suspicion. Every day when leaving the factory the workers had to make sure they carried no trace of their work, such as brass shavings or gunpowder. Everyone went through a thorough inspection of their clothes, hair and shoes before being allowed to exit the factory. To pretend they taking part in ordinary kibbutz life, the workers daily attended lunch with the other kibbutz inhabitants in the dining hall: Each noon they left the factory secretly for lunch, individually or in small groups, to mimic arrival from the surrounding fields.

During the first year of its existence, boxes of completed ammunition were smuggled outside the kibbutz in the false bottom of milk cans, milk being an unsuspicious commodity for a kibbutz. The risk of discovery, and the limited volume this allowed the factory to move, led to a search for a new means of delivery. It was also necessary to allow the distribution of the ammunition to all places in Palestine which were in preparation for defence. A new means of smuggling material both into and out of the factory was instituted: From time to time and nightly, fuel was delivered to the kibbutz by lorry. The lorry driver was known only to the person on guard in the kibbutz. The driver would enter the kibbutz, knock a secret code at the door of the bakery, climb down to the factory, deliver new material and pick up the filled boxes. Since the workers never met the driver, the person was referred to as "an elf", providing the materials needed without being seen. For the Haganah, it was of outmost importance that all secret groups never know each other. In the worst case – in case of capture – they could never betray any group other than their own. The bullets were distributed via the network of Haganah-organised groups. Thus, by providing the munition for the Palmach fighters it played a role in the establishment of Israel.
