= Ein HaMifratz =

Kibbutz in Northern Israel

Ein HaMifratz: עֵין הַמִּפְרָץ (Hebrew)
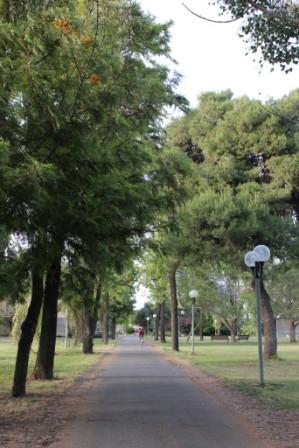

- Location within Northwest Israel Location within Israel
- Coordinates: 32°54′9″N 35°5′47″E
- Country: Israel
- District: Northern
- Subdistrict: Acre
- Council: Mateh Asher
- Affiliation: Kibbutz Movement
- Founded: 25 August 1938
- Founder: Polish Jews
- Population (2024): 873

Ein HaMifratz (Hebrew: עֵין הַמִּפְרָץ, lit. Bayview) is a kibbutz south of Acre in northern Israel. Located on the Mediterranean coast, it falls under the jurisdiction of Mateh Asher Regional Council. As of 2024 it had a population of 873.

== History ==
Kibbutz Ein HaMifratz was established in August 1938 by Polish immigrants as part of the tower and stockade settlement enterprise, during the 1936–39 Arab revolt.

According to the Jewish National Fund, upon its founding, Ein HaMifratz was immediately attacked by "Arab gangs". The initial problems facing the settlers were the saltwater swamps and the shifting sands at the mouth of the Na'aman River. The settler originally did mixed farming and fish breeding. By 1947 the kibbutz had a population of 400.

Until the capture of Acre, Ein Hamifratz was a frontline settlement. The settlers were involved in the conquest of the Galilee in November 1948.

== Economy ==
Major industries are Yamaton Ltd., a honeycomb paper factory operated jointly with Kibbutz Ga'aton, and IMA, a corrugated cardboard manufacturing company. Ein Hamifratz also operates a fish farm and a shopping mall.

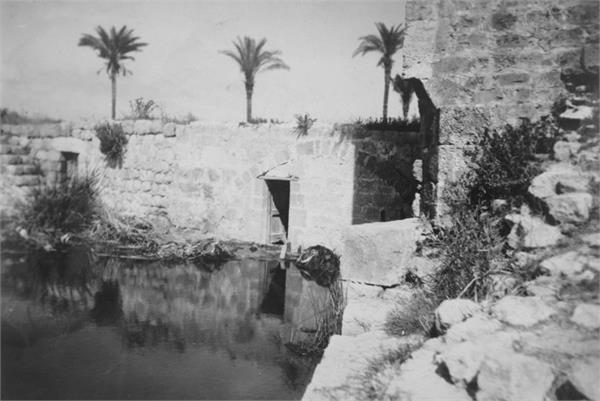
Ein HaMifratz 1935

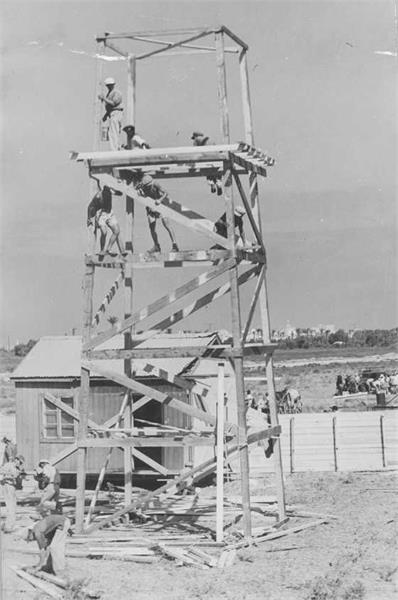
Ein HaMifratz under construction, 1938

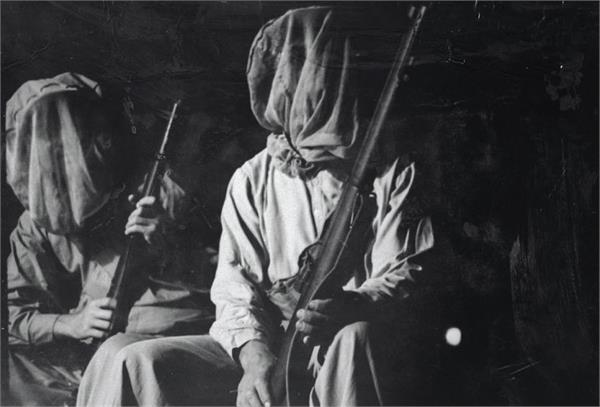
Ein HaMifratz mosquitoes 1938

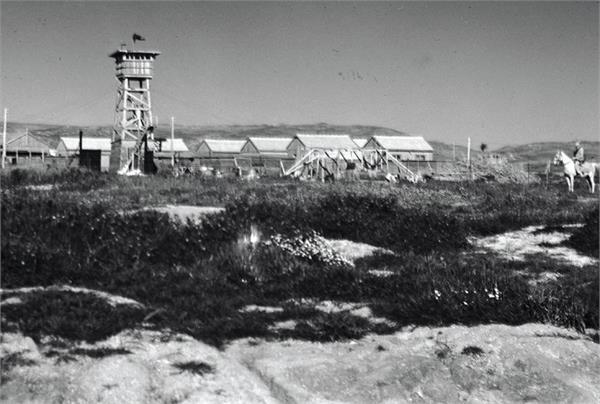
Ein HaMifratz 1939

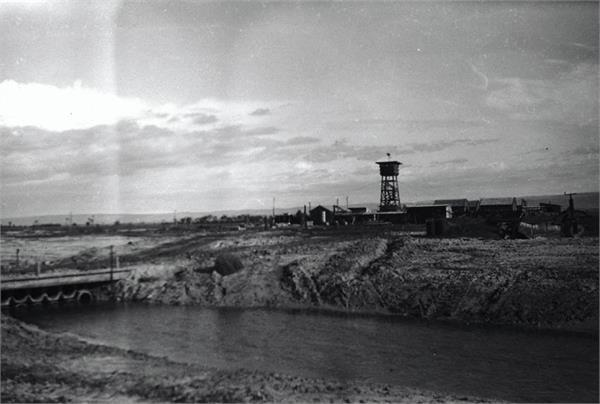
Ein HaMifratz drainage canal 1939

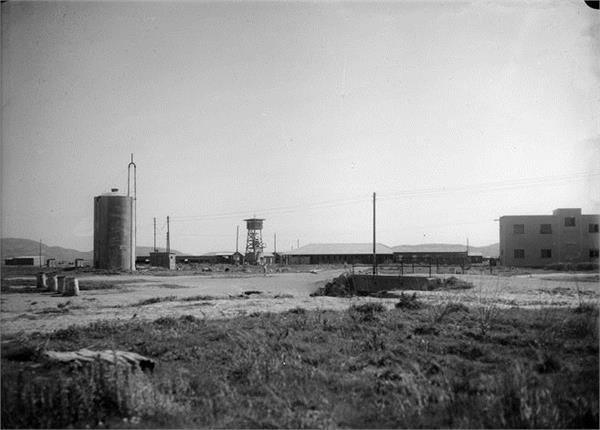
Ein HaMifratz 1940

== Notable people ==
- Amnon Eshkol
- Avraham Ofek
