= Sde Nahum =

Kibbutz in northern Israel

Sde Nahum: שְׂדֵה נַחוּם (Hebrew)
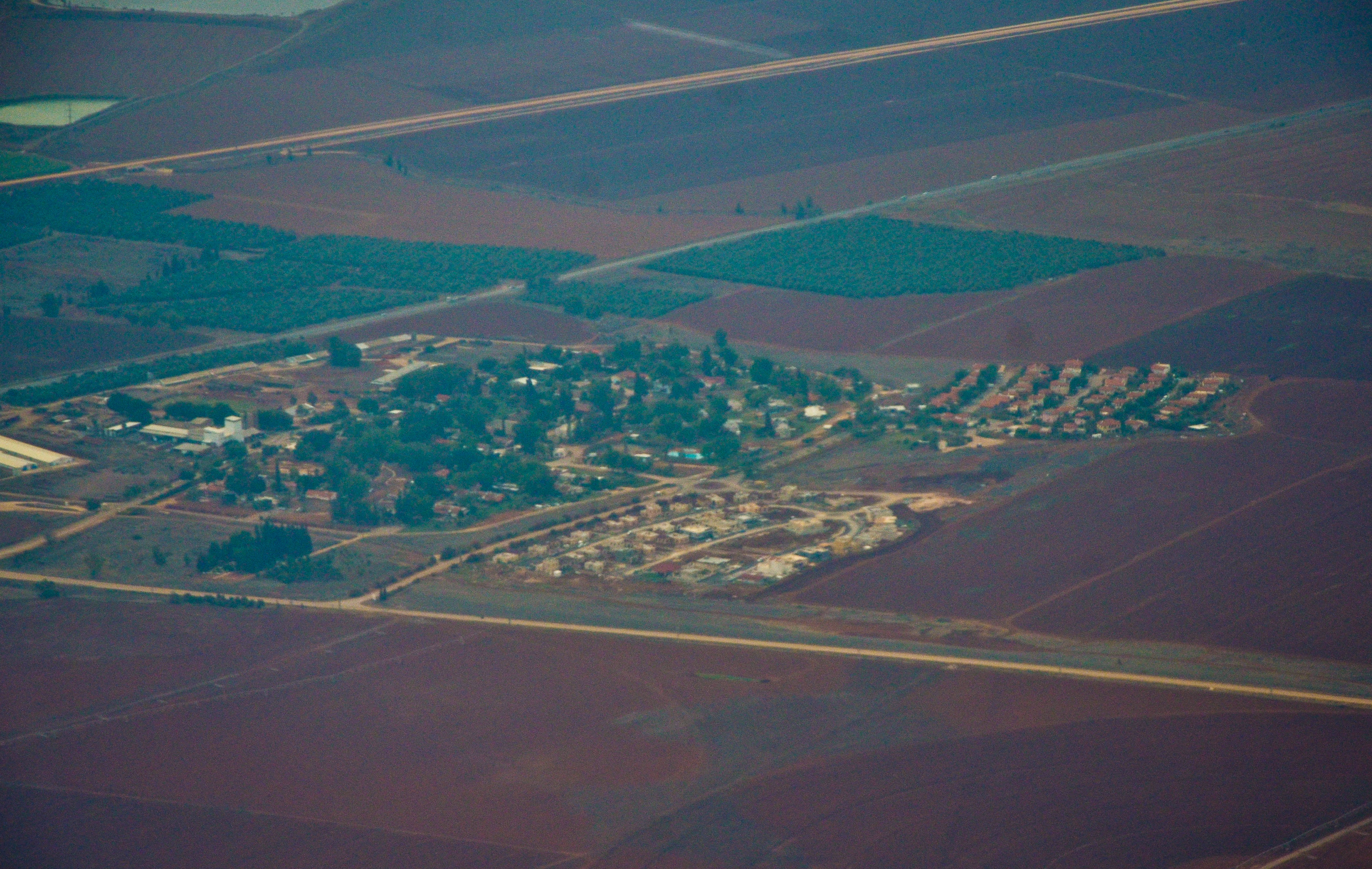
- Etymology: Nahum’s Field
- Location within Jezreel Valley region of Israel Location within Israel
- Coordinates: 32°31′31″N 35°28′54″E
- Country: Israel
- District: Northern
- Subdistrict: Jezreel
- Council: Emek HaMaayanot Regional Council
- Affiliation: Kibbutz Movement
- Founded: 5 January 1937
- Founder: Sadeh group members
- Population (2024): 1,204
- Website: www.sde-nahum.org.il

Sde Nahum (Hebrew: שְׂדֵה נַחוּם, lit. Nahum Field) is a kibbutz in the Beit She'an Valley in northern Israel. Located around 4 km northwest of Beit She'an, it falls under the jurisdiction of Emek HaMaayanot Regional Council. In 2024 it had a population of 1,204.

== History ==
The kibbutz was founded on 5 January 1937 by members of the Sadeh group from the Mikveh Israel agricultural school, as well as immigrants from Austria, Germany and Poland. It was the third kibbutz established as part of the tower and stockade settlement movement. Initially called "Kibbutz HaSadeh," it was later renamed in honour of Nahum Sokolov, a Hebrew writer and Zionist leader.

Ruins of a 5th–6th century Byzantine church has been found in the kibbutz.

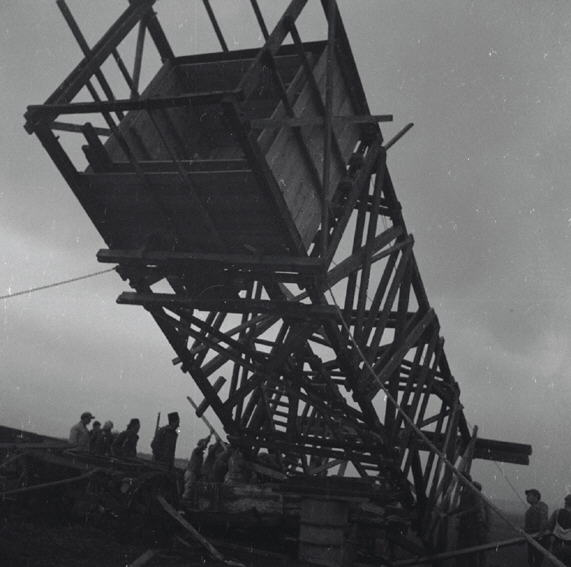
Sde Nahum day of the Aliyah 1937

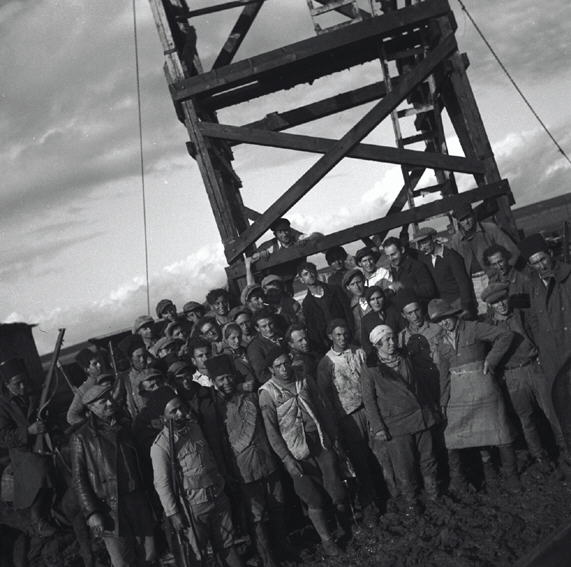
Sde Nahum founders 1937

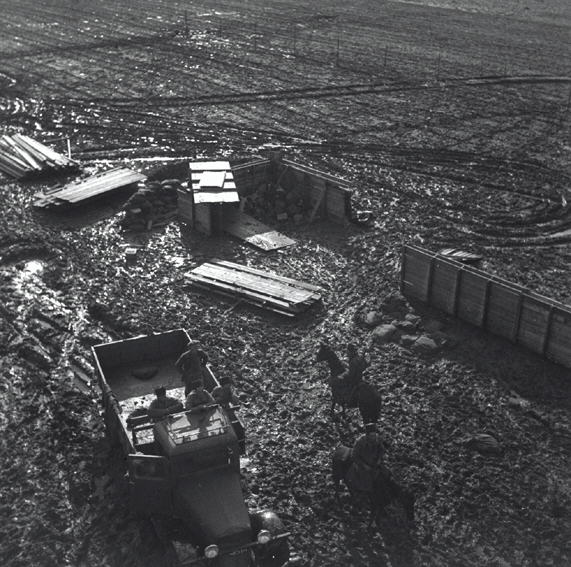
Sde Nahum construction of stockade wall 1937

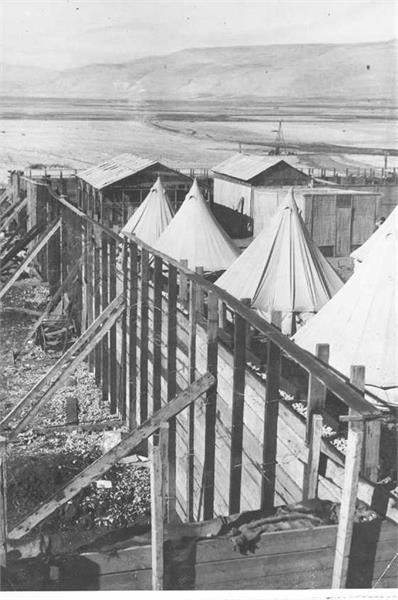
Sde Nahum wall construction 1937

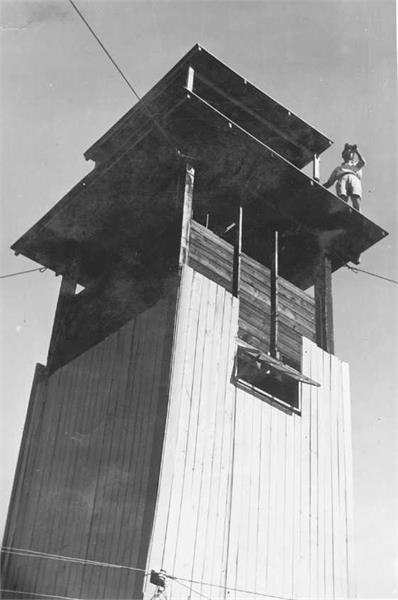
Sde Nahum 1937

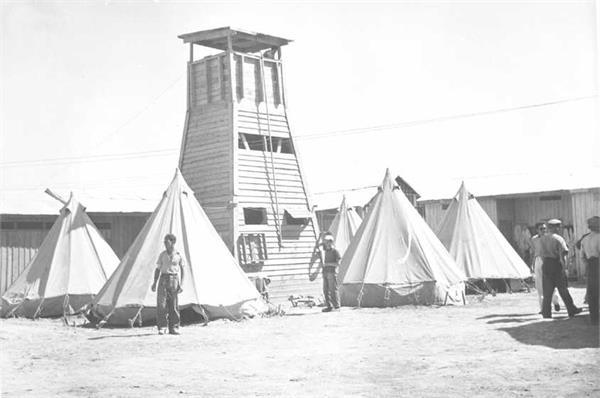
Sde Nahum 1939

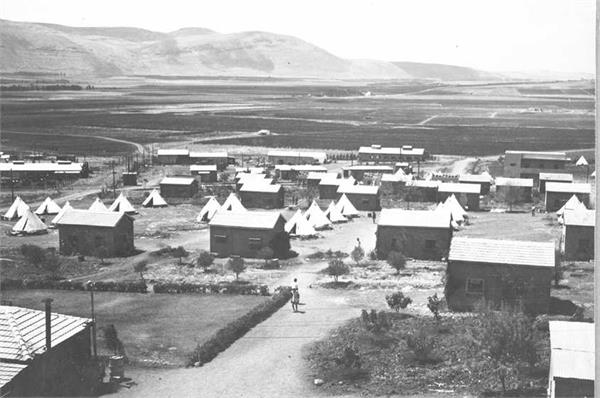
Sde Nahum 1939

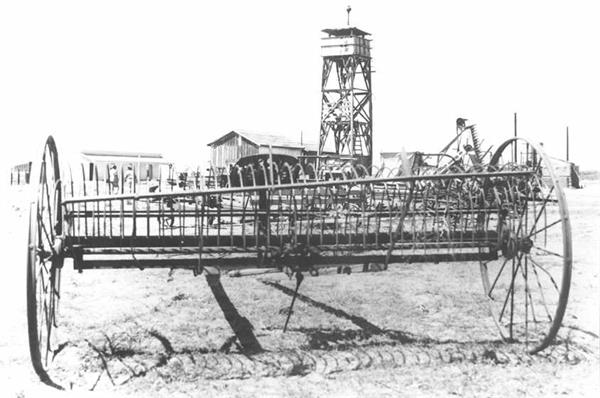
Sde Nahum 1940

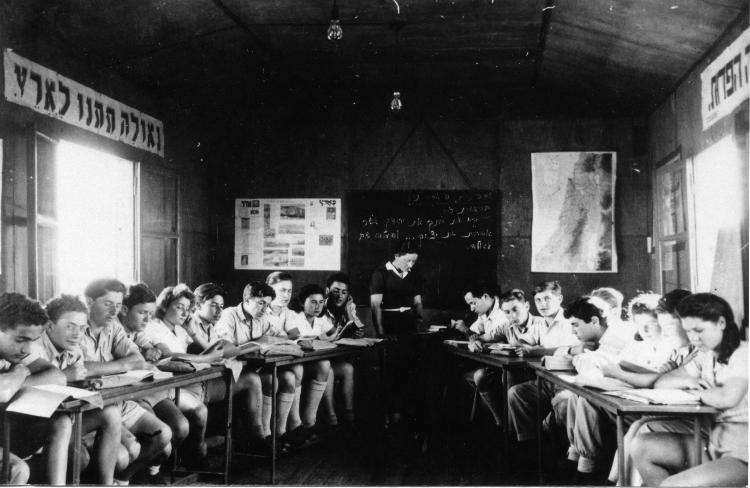
1947 photo of Nahum classroom from Palmach archive

== Notable people ==
- Arieh Warshel, Nobel Prize-winning chemist (2013) and professor at the University of Southern California was born in Sde Nahum in 1940
