= Maoz =

Maoz may refer to:

== Given name ==
- Maoz Inon, Israeli tourism entrepreneur
- Maoz Samia (born 1987), Israeli footballer

== Surname ==
- Samuel Maoz (born c. 1962), Israeli film director
- Eyal Maoz (born 1969), Israeli-born American guitarist, bandleader, solo performer and composer
- Zeev Maoz (born 1951), American Professor of Political Science and Director of the Correlates of War Project at the University of California, Davis
- Avi Maoz (born 1956), Israeli politician

== Ships ==
- INS Ma'oz (K 24), Israeli Navy ship which previously served in the United States Navy as USS Cythera (PY-31)

== See also ==
- Maoz Haim, kibbutz in Israel
- Maoz Haim Synagogue, basilica building in Israel
- Ma'oz Tzur, Jewish liturgical poem (piyyut)
