= Highway 71 (Israel) =

Highway in Israel

Coordinates: 32°33′30″N 35°22′15″E

Highway 71
- כביש 71
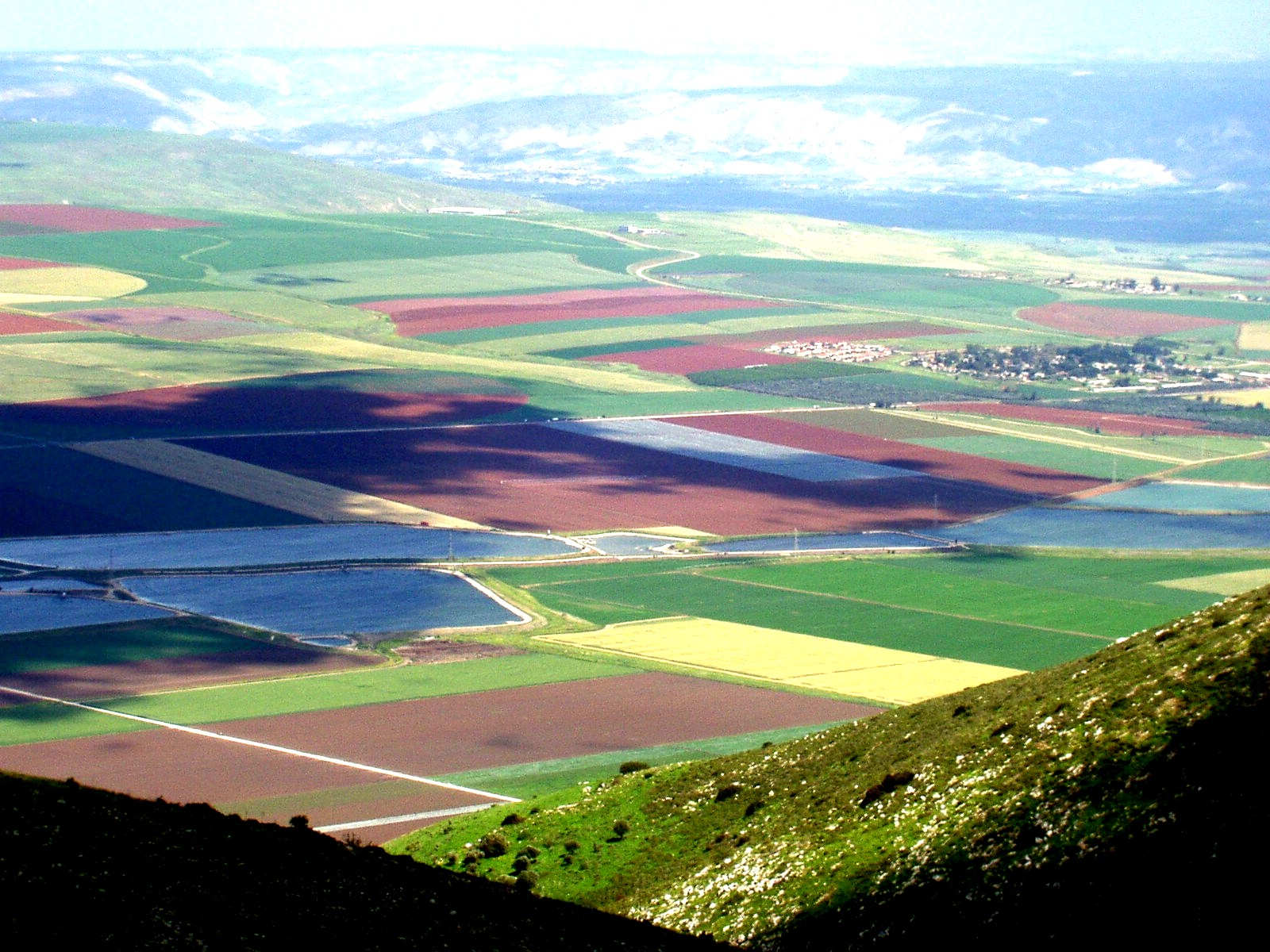
- Harod Valley and Route 71 in the center

Route information
- Length: 31 km (19 mi)

Major junctions
- West end: Unnamed Square
- East end: Jordan River Crossing

Location
- Country: Israel
- Major cities: Afula

Highway system
- Roads in Israel; Highways
← Highway 70	→ Highway 73

Highway 71 is an east-west highway that passes through the eastern Jezreel Valley and the Beit She'an Valley, below the north slopes of the Gilboa mountains, in northern Israel. The road follows a path parallel to the Harod Creek in the Harod Valley and to the Jezreel Valley railway. It is 35 kilometres (22 mi) long and leads from Afula in the west, via Beit She'an, to the Jordan River Border Crossing in the east. The Navot interchange located approximately 10 km southeast of Afula provides a shortcut via Route 675 through the Ta'anakh region from Highway 71 and Beit She'an to Highway 65 and central Israel.

== Plans ==
The portion of the highway between the Navot interchange and Yissachar junction is a four-lane limited-access road, with the rest of the highway consisting of two lanes. In 2020, the National Roads Authority (Netivei Yisrael) published a design-build contract to upgrade the remainder of the highway from Yissachar to Beit She'an to a four-lane limited access road and conversion most of the main intersections to interchanges. This busy section serves local and inter-city traffic to Beit She'an, including frequent freight traffic to and from the border crossing with Jordan.

== Junctions & Interchanges (West to East) ==
District	Location	km	mi	Name	Destinations	Notes
Northern	Afula	0	0.0	כיכר ללא שם (Unnamed Square)	Ben Gurion Blvd.	
Northern	Merhavia (kibbutz)	0.5	0.31	צומת מרחביה (Merhavia Junction)	Road 7155	
Northern	Merhavia (moshav)	2	1.2	צומת מושב מרחביה (Moshav Merhavia Junction)	Entrance to Merhavia (moshav)	
Northern	Kfar Yehezkel	8	5.0	מחלף נבות (Navot Interchange)	Route 675	
Northern	Kfar Yehezkel	9	5.6	מחלף גדעונה (Gidona Interchange)	Road 7101; Road 7103	
Northern	Ein Harod	11	6.8	צומת יששכר (Yissachar Junction)	Route 716	
Northern	Tel Yosef	12	7.5	צומת תל יוסף (Tel Yosef Junction)	Road 7107	
Northern	Beit HaShita	16	9.9	מחלף השיטה (HaShita Interchange)	Route 669; Road 7105	
Northern	Sde Nahum	20.5	12.7	צומת שדה נחום (Sde Nahum Junction)	Entrance to Sde Nahum	
Northern	Beit She'an	22	14	צומת מחנה גדעון (Gideon Camp Junction)	HaHashmal Street	
Northern	Beit She'an	23	14	כיכר ללא שם (Unnamed Square)	Road 7078	
Northern	Beit She'an	23.5	14.6	צים סנטר (Tsim Center)	Ha'Amel Street	
Northern	Beit She'an	25	16	צומת שאן (She'an Junction)	Highway 90	
Northern	Emek HaMaayanot Regional Council	26	16	צומת מעוז חיים (Maoz Haim Junction)	Road 7079	
Northern	Neve Eitan	27	17	צומת בית קולין (Beit Colin Junction)	Western entrance to Neve Eitan	
Northern	Neve Eitan	27.5	17.1	צומת נווה איתן (Neve Eitan Junction)	Eastern entrance to Neve Eitan	
Northern	Maoz Haim	29.5	18.3	צומת רופין (Rupin Junction)	Road 6688	
Northern	Jordan River Crossing	31	19	צומת נהר הירדן (Jordan River Junction)	Crossing to Jordan	
1.000 mi = 1.609 km; 1.000 km = 0.621 mi

== Places of interest on Highway 71 ==
- Ma'ayan Harod National Park
- Beit Shturman Museum
- Trumpeldor House
- Beit She'an National Park
- Geon HaYarden Nature Reserve
- Mishkan Museum of Art

== See also ==
- List of highways in Israel
