= Meir Meivar =

Israeli general

- מאיר מיבר
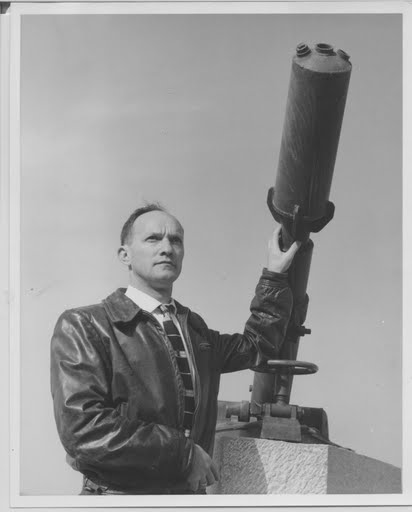
- Meir Meivar, c. 1948
- Born: January 30, 1918; Safed, Mandatory Palestine
- Died: November 11, 2000 (aged 82); Jerusalem, Israel
- Burial place: Safed Old Jewish Cemetery
- Military career
- Allegiance: Israel
- Rank: Commander
- Awards: Yakir Safed

Meir Meivar (Hebrew: מאיר מיבר; 1918 – 2000), was the Haganah commander of the city of Safed during the 1948 Arab–Israeli War. Meivar was the mayor of Safed in 1965–1966.

== Biography ==
Meir Meiberg (later Meivar) was born in Safed, Mandatory Palestine, to an Orthodox Jewish family. His mother, Tova (née Libman), was born in Safed. His father, Yehuda, immigrated from Bessarabia and served on the municipal council of Safed. Meir studied in a Cheder and later a Talmud Torah (Jewish religious schools). When he was eleven years old, Meir witnessed the murder of a Jewish neighbor during the 1929 Palestine riots, in which 20 Safed Jews were killed by local Arabs. According to his memoirs, the event deeply influenced him. At the age of 15, he studied at the Scottish College in Safed, where the students were mostly Christian and Muslim. He graduated in 1938.

=== Military career ===
Meivar was fourteen when he joined the ranks of the Haganah as a courier boy. After a short while in Maccabi youth movement, he moved to serve with Betar and was soon assigned as the commander of the local branch, taking in parallel also the command of the "Etzel" in Safed. This lasted until 1940, when the Etzel split into "Etzel" and "Lehi". In his book, Meivar describes his involvement with various youth movements as a character building experience, and emphasizes that volunteering for multiple organizations, sometimes with contradicting ideologies, did not interfere with his evolvement as a future commander.

In 1938 Meivar formally joined the fighting forces of Haganah; his first commander was Miriam Stern. A short while after the Arab revolt and massacres of Tiberias, he was sent to an officers’ course. Most of his activities involved evading British troops, and helping Safed acquire ammunition and weapons. The overall goal was to prepare for future revolts and battles. However, in 1939, at the beginning of World War II, the Arab revolts in Mandatory Palestine ceased. Although Haganah recommended assisting the British by providing them with some troops, Meivar refused. In his book, he justifies this decision, claiming that he was already part of four different military courses, and dealing with the tension between Etzel and Haganah, which peaked at 1940. Eventually, Meivar's meeting with Avraham Stern (founder of Lehi) was one of the key influences leading to his leaving of Etzel.

In 1944, Meivar was appointed the commander of Safed by Giora Shanan, the Deputy Palmach Commander. According to Meivar's book, at the time the Haganah forces in Safed had approximately 100 troopers. One of his immediate goals was to recruit more people. His motivation was the prevalent conflict and the imminent battles. Since he grew up as a commander in the lines of Etzel, he was able to convince his former fighters to join the Haganah training. Later, in the 1948 War, those same fighters completely united with the Haganah forces, resulting in a better ability to defend the city.

==== 1948 War ====
Preparations for the war began more than 10 years before it actually begun. In 1936, Meivar participated in devising an overall defense plan to protect Safed's Jewish quarter. His role included setting the positions, stocking them with ammunition, defining sectors and conducting mental preparations of the fighters. These arrangements, made with Mordechai Leibovitz (Ben-Ari), were the cornerstone of Safed's Jewish quarter defense, which was later proved essential. When Yitzhak Sadeh, the Palmach chief commander, was asked about the situation in Safed, he said that the one who will control the city's fortress, will be able to take control over the whole city. Hence the title of Meivar's book, "At the Shadow of the Fortress" (In Hebrew: "בצל המצודה").

In December 1947, Haganah forces in the Jewish quarter counted around 250 fighters. The Arab forces had around 3,000 fighters (according to the memoirs of Colonel Wasfi al-Tal, one of the leaders of the Arab Liberation Army). The Jewish leadership did not know the real size of their opponents, a fact that increased their deep concerns during the pre-war period

The battles over Safed begun on January 2, 1948, and their frequency increased until a siege was declared in April 1948. Without civil authorities in charge, the military sector commanders have become “civil governors” de facto, led by Meivar. He had to continuously make both civil and military decisions. Among his notable decisions was his choice to invest resources in improving the Jewish citizens’ morale. Through “The Voice of Safed” (Hebrew: קול צפת), a leaflet printed and distributed using underground methods, he tried to maintain a cohesive community. Another major decision was related to conduct in battle: he instructed his fighters to detonate a grenade upon themselves and the enemy, in case they were captured. Although this was a military instruction, it was not given as a military command.

On April 16, 1948, the British forces, which had a mandate of the region at the time, started evacuating the city. The Arab forces tried a surprise attack, striking the Jewish side while they were defenseless; Syrian, Lebanese and Iraqi flags were posted on the local police station. The Jewish response was posting a blue-and-white flag on Merkazi hotel. By night, Meivar led a complex operation. That operation resulted in the blasting of the Scottish Church of Safed by the Arab forces and the blasting of the police station by the Jewish forces. Since the electric generator was damaged, the whole city was blacked-out.

Thanks to emergency telegrams, Palmach forces armed with Davidka mortars were sent to reinforce the Haganah fighters, and the city came under the full control of the Jewish forces by May 11, 1948. Throughout the battles Meivar maintained his composure, except on May 8, when a bomb shell penetrated the bedroom of his wife Sarah and his two children, Yair (four years old at the time) and Drora (two months old).

Yigal Alon, the commander of the Palmach and Meivar's closest friend, wrote in his book that the liberation of Safed was complex due to its topography: flanking the Arab forces was practically impossible. However, the wise identification of the city's key strategic points, the fortress, the police station and Bet Shalva, helped focus the firepower and gain strategic advantage.

=== Political and business career ===
After the war Meivar stayed in Safed and turned to serve the local community, holding various local government positions. For several years he was member of Safed's municipal council as a representative of Gahal. During the 1960s he was elected as the mayor of Safed. It was the first time a non-Mapai member was acting mayor. However, his coalition did not last until the end of his term.

Later, Meivar worked as a branch manager for the First International Bank of Israel. In the early 1970s he founded Motel Zefat on the Mountain of Canaan. After almost twenty years of operation, the motel was sold and converted into the dormitories of Zefat Academic College.

He was among the founders of local Freemasonry branch, and its first president. During his term as president of the Safed branch of Rotary International, he initiated the planting of the Paul Harris Peace Forest, which still thrives in the Galilee in northern Israel.

Meivar moved to Jerusalem in the late 1980s. In the 1990s he received the honour of Yakir Safed (“honorable of Safed”), for his contributions during the 1948 War and his achievements as a local business owner, particularly his success with Motel Zefat.

Meivar changed his surname in 1948 from Meiberg (מייברג) to Meivar (מיבר). He married Sarah, a Safed native, and he fathered three children: Yair, a naval engineer, Drora, an organizational psychologist, and Ruth, an Insurance consultant. He had eight grandchildren: Yael (murdered in a terrorist attack in 1998), Jonathan, Boaz, Ariel, Yoav, Galia, Ehud and Alon.

He died in Jerusalem.

== Published works ==
- In the Shadow of the Fortress
