= Giora =

Giora is an Aramaic and Hebrew name, originating with Simon bar Giora (d. 70 CE). The name Simon bar Giora identifies him as "Simon, son of Giora." The name Giora (גִּיּוֹרָא) means "convert" or "sojourner" in Aramaic, and is equivalent to the Hebrew word ger (Hebrew: גֵּר), indicating a non-Jewish background.

== People ==
=== Given name ===
- Giora Antman, Israeli footballer and coach
- Giora Bernstein (born 1933), conductor, classical violinist, and Professor Emeritus of Music
- Giora Eiland (born 1952), major general of the Israel Defense Forces
- Giora Epstein (1938–2025), colonel in the Israeli Air Force
- Giora Feidman (born 1936), Argentinian-Jewish clarinetist
- Giora Godik, Jewish Israeli theater producer and impresario
- Giora Leshem (1940–2011), Israeli poet and translator
- Giora Romm (born 1945), deputy commander of the Israeli Air Force
- Giora Schmidt (born 1983), American/Israeli violinist
- Giora Shanan (1908-2001), Israeli Palmach member
- Giora Spiegel (born 1947), Israeli footballer and coach
- Giora Yoseftal (1912–62), Israeli politician

=== Surname ===
- Jonathan Bar Giora (born 1962), Israeli composer and pianist
- Simon bar Giora (d. 70 CE), a leader of revolutionary forces during the First Jewish-Roman War in the 1st century Judea

== Organizations ==
- Bar-Giora (organization), a Jewish self-defense organization of the Second Aliyah

== Places ==
- Bar Giora, moshav in the Judean Mountains
