= Al-Ghazzawiyya =

Ghazzawiyya الغزاويه al-Ghazawiya, Arab al Ghazawiya tribe, Arab Abu Hashiya (Frantzman)
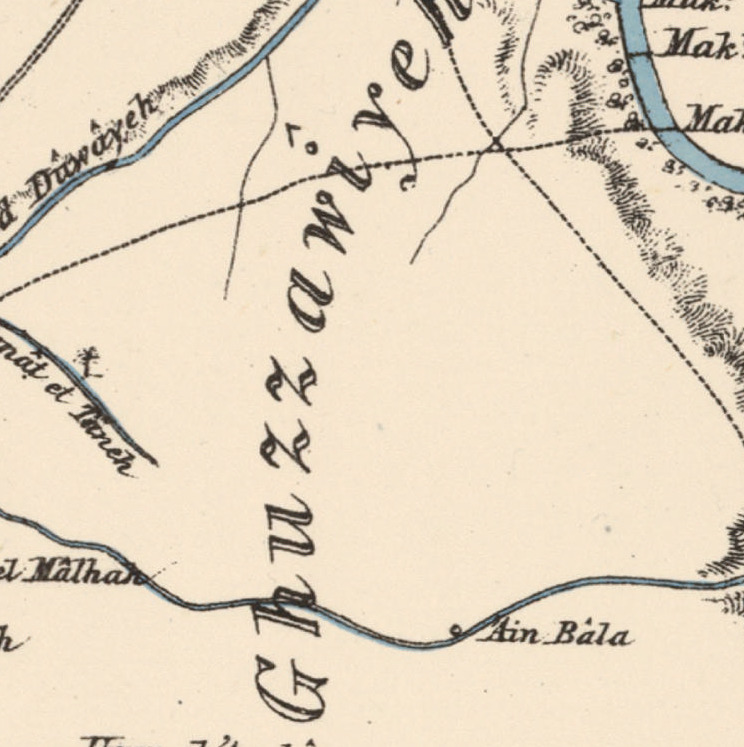
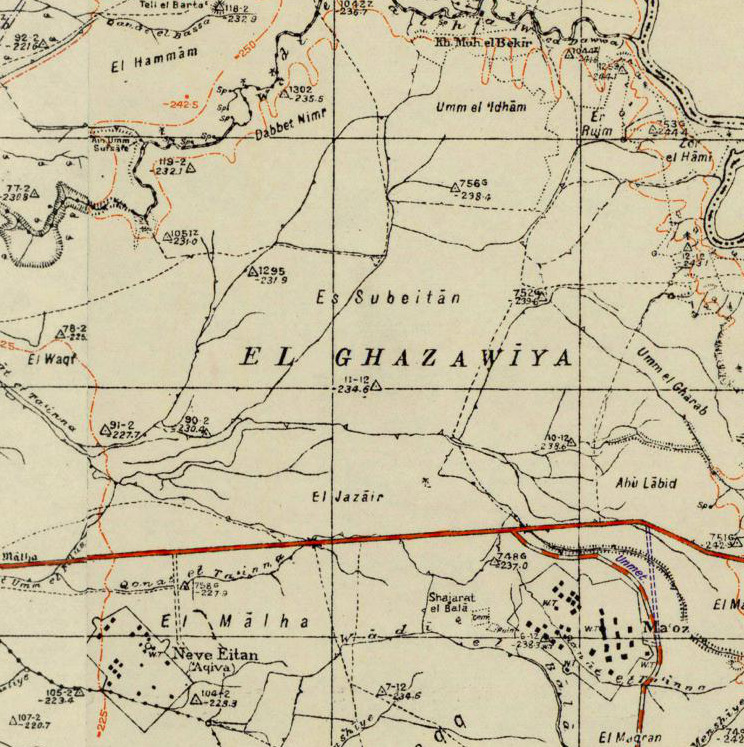
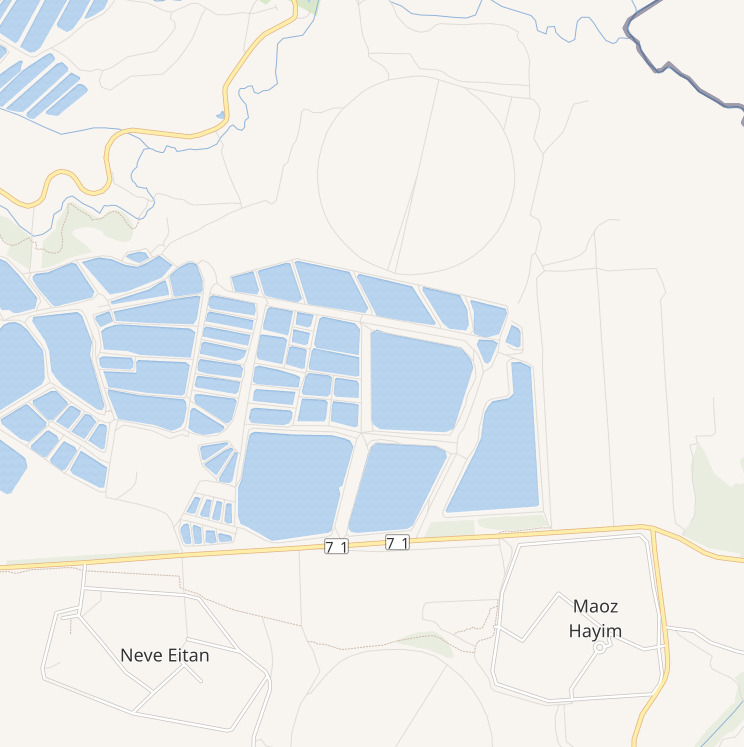
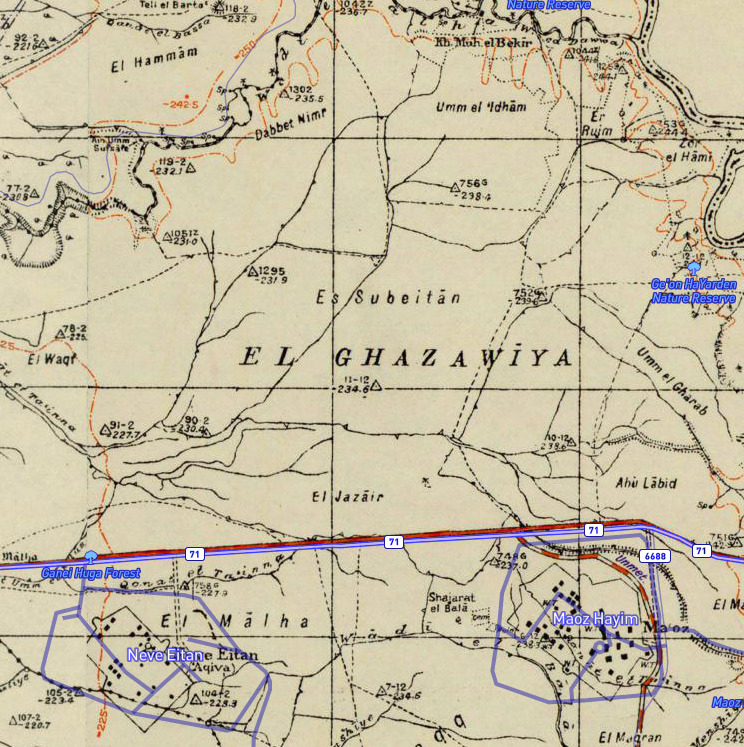
- 1870s map 1940s map modern map 1940s with modern overlay map A series of historical maps of the area around Al-Ghazzawiyya (click the buttons)

- Location within Mandatory Palestine
- Coordinates: 32°30′08″N 35°32′30″E
- Palestine grid: 200/212
- Geopolitical entity: Mandatory Palestine
- Subdistrict: Baysan
- Date of depopulation: May 20, 1948

Area
  - Total: 18.4 km^{2} (7.1 sq mi)

Population (1945)
  - Total: 1,020
- Cause(s) of depopulation: Influence of nearby town's fall
- Current Localities: Neve Eitan, Maoz Haim

Al-Ghazzawiyya (Arabic: الغزاويه), was a Palestinian village located 2 kilometers east of the city of Bet Shean (Bisan). In 1945, the population was 1,640, 1,020 Arab and 620 Jewish.

== History ==
Several archeological sites in the area testify to a long history of human occupancy. The village was surrounded by the archeological sites of Tall-al Barta to the north, Tall al-Husn to the west, and Tall al-Maliha to the southwest. Excavations of Tall al-Husn showed an occupational history extending from the third millennium BC to the eighth century CE, when the site was occupied by an Arab village.

=== British Mandate era ===
In modern times, the village spread over a wide area of the Baysan valley. The villagers were members of the al-Ghazzawiyya Beduin tribe, who constituted the bulk of the valley's population together with members of the al-Bashatiwa and the al-Suqur. In the 1931 census, conducted by the British Mandate authorities, 'Arab Abu Hashiya had 156 Muslim inhabitants, and a total of 29 houses.

In the 1945 statistics, Al-Ghazzawiyya had 1,020, all Muslim inhabitants with a total of 18,408 dunams of land. Of this, a total of 13 dunams were used for citrus and bananas, 5,185 dunums for cereals, 34 dunums were irrigated or used for orchards, while 91 dunams were classified as non-cultivable land.

=== 1948 and aftermath ===
It was occupied by Israel's Golani Brigade on May 20, 1948, during Operation Gideon, an Israeli offensive during the 1948 Arab-Israeli War. The Arab population was forced to flee to nearby Syria or the present-day West Bank.

The Jewish localities of Maoz Haim and Neve Eitan are built on the lands of the former village, though a large percentage of it is used as agricultural land, in particular the wheat crop. According to Walid Khalidi, the village contained an archaeological site, Tell al-Ru'yan which was transformed into waste dump.

== See also ==
- Depopulated Palestinian locations in Israel

== Bibliography ==
- Government of Palestine, Department of Statistics (1945). Village Statistics, April, 1945.
- Hadawi, S. (1970). Village Statistics of 1945: A Classification of Land and Area ownership in Palestine. Palestine Liberation Organization Research Centre. Archived from the original on 2018-12-08.
- Khalidi, W. (1992). All That Remains:The Palestinian Villages Occupied and Depopulated by Israel in 1948. Washington D.C.: Institute for Palestine Studies. ISBN 0-88728-224-5.
- Mills, E., ed. (1932). Census of Palestine 1931. Population of Villages, Towns and Administrative Areas. Jerusalem: Government of Palestine.
- Morris, B. (2004). The Birth of the Palestinian Refugee Problem Revisited. Cambridge University Press. ISBN 978-0-521-00967-6.
