= Palyam =

Naval service of Haganah's Palmach force

Palyam (Hebrew: פלי״ם, an abbreviation of Plugat HaYam (פלוגת הים), lit. 'Sea Company') was the marines of the Palmach.

Palyam Emblem

== History ==
Palyam was set up in April 1945 as the Palmach's tenth company (Pluga Yud) which originated from the Palmach's Naval Platoon. The Company's first commander was Abraham Zakai. It belonged to the Fourth Battalion which was the Palmach's Staff Battalion, attached to the Palmach's Staff Battalion (the 4th Battalion).

The division was in charge of amphibious warfare, beach reconnaissance, close-quarters combat, maritime security, naval boarding, providing security at naval base or shore stations, raiding with small unit tactics, screening, and underwater demolition. The majority of their activities were related to the escorting of ships of Aliyah Bet, immigration ships (66 of them in all) bringing Jewish refugees from Europe by boat, despite the British White Paper of 1939 limiting Jewish immigration into Mandate Palestine.

From August 1945 to May 1948, approximately seventy Palyamniks escorted close to 70,000 immigrants in 66 sea voyages, from Sweden in the north to Algeria in the south, France in the west to Romania in the east. They also escorted the arms ships that brought vital arms during the war.

On the eve of the 1948 Arab-Israeli War, Palyam consisted of approximately four hundred marines, eighty of them were graduates of the marine officers course which was held in the Marine School near the Technion, and seventy of them graduates of the ship commanders course at kibbutz Sdot Yam.

Headquarters of Palyam was located in kibbutz Sdot Yam, but the unit had installations in kibbutz Neve Yam, Ma'abarot, Giv'at HaShlosha, Shefayim and Yagur.

On March 17, 1948, the Naval Service (the precursor of the Israeli Sea Corps) was formed, and the Palyam were ordered to join. Many of the Palyam members formed the core personnel and command of the Naval Service. In fact, most ship commanders during the first years of the Navy, and up to 1975, most of the Navy's commander-in-chiefs, were Palyam veterans.

Palyam members who specialized in maritime sabotage formed Shayetet 13, the IDF Naval Commando unit.

== Notable Palyamniks ==
- Yohai Ben-Nun, commander of 'Plugot HaNamal'
- Yigal Weiss, part of the Hulya (fire unit) with Yohai ben-Nun and Shaul Oren
- Yehuda. L. Ben-Tzur, Palyam commander
- Arieh Kaplan – Palyam commander. Arieh (Kipi) was chosen as the first commander of the immigrant camps on Cyprus. He established a defense unit from among the immigrants, who intended to enlist in the Palmach, designed to deal with internal security needs, and help Palmach members to keep control over the camp.
- Yossi Harel, commander of four expeditions between 1946 and 1948, including the boat, 'President Warfield', better known as 'Exodus 1947'
- Dov Magen
- Zalman Perach, Palyam commander. Zalman commanded the Haapala ship "Enzo Sereny" that sailed from north of Savona, Italy. On January 9, 1946, with 908 immigrants on board. British destroyers forced the ship to sail to Haifa port, where it arrived on January 17. The immigrants were unloaded and taken to detention at Atlit camp.
- Les Solomon, U.S. Army Ranger who landed in Normandy, sailed on Altalena, and served on a Palyam ship. Worked with Bill Gates before Microsoft was formed and was the technical editor of "Popular Electronics" magazine.
- Shmuel Tankus, became Head of the Navy
- Emmanuel Weinstein (later called Lukas Vongard), served in the Royal Canadian Navy, helped prepare the 'President Warfield' as the Haganah Ship Exodus 1947, joined the crew of the Tradewinds (Hatikvah), served in Haganah's maritime sabotage unit and then to the "HaPortzim" unit fighting for Jerusalem. In June 1948, he was transferred to the nascent Israeli navy.
- Shmuel Yanai, Palyam commander
- Yoska Yariv, Palyam commander
- Avraham Zakai, first commander of Palyam
