= Neve Eitan =

Neve Eitan: נווה איתן (Hebrew)
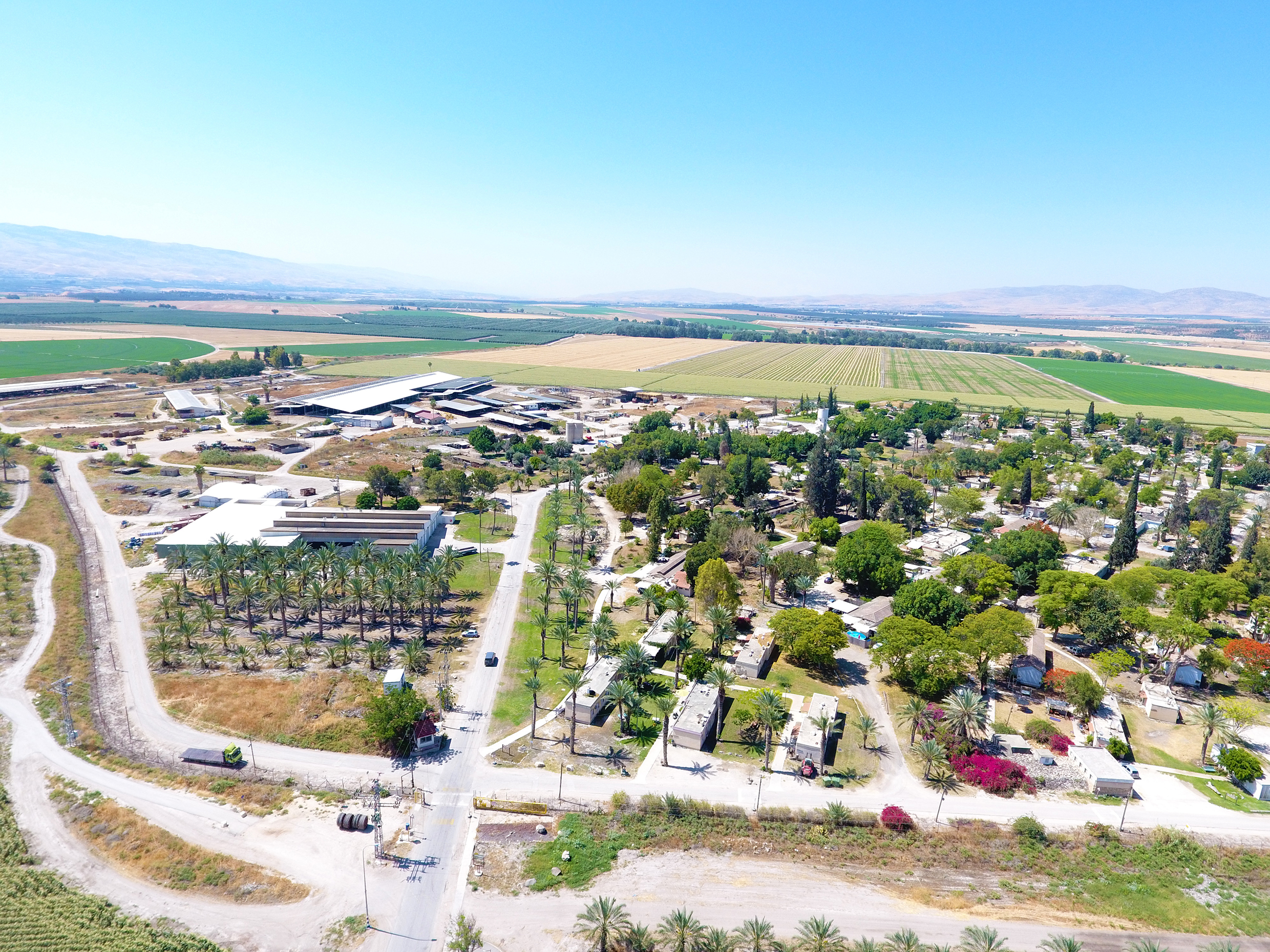
- Etymology: Strong Residence
- Location within Jezreel Valley region of Israel Location within Israel
- Coordinates: 32°29′28″N 35°31′52″E
- Country: Israel
- District: Northern
- Subdistrict: Jezreel
- Council: Valley of Springs
- Affiliation: Kibbutz Movement
- Founded: 25 November 1938
- Founder: Polish Jews
- Population (2024): 288

Neve Eitan (Hebrew: נווה איתן, lit. 'Strong Residence') is a kibbutz in the Beit She'an Valley in northern Israel. Located about 1 kilometre (1,000 m) east of Beit She'an and 1 kilometre (1,000 m) west of Maoz Haim, it is under the jurisdiction of Valley of Springs Regional Council. In 2024, it had a population of 288.

== Etymology ==
The name "Neve Eitan" is based on the original Hebrew text of a verse in Jeremiah (Jeremiah, 49:19), in which God curses Edom to sudden overthrow: "It shall be as when a lion comes up out of the jungle of the Jordan (Ge'on HaYarden: גְּאֹ֣ון הַיַּרְדֵּן֮) against a secure pasture (Neve Eitan: נְוֵ֣ה אֵיתָן֒)" (JPS1985).

== History ==
Neve Eitan was established on land near the Palestinian village of Al-Ghazzawiyya.

The kibbutz was established on 25 November 1938 by Polish members of the "Akiva" movement as part of the tower and stockade campaign. Sabras (Jews born in the Land of Israel) joined the settlement in 1952.

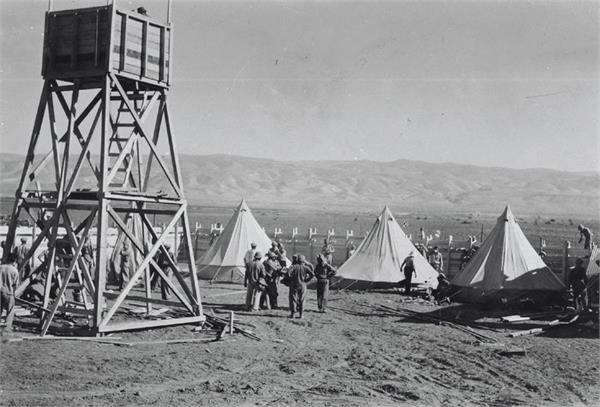
Neve Eitan 1938

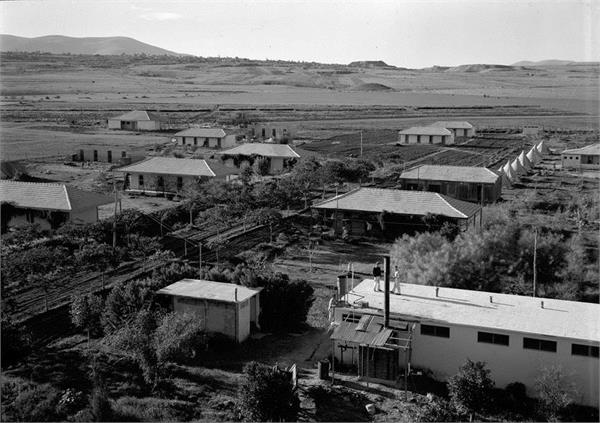
Neve Eitan 1946

== Education ==
The kibbutz is home to the "Ge'on HaYarden" (lit. 'vegetation on the banks of the Jordan') high school, which has more than 500 pupils.

== Notable people ==
- Shmuel Yanai (1921-2011), commander of the Israeli Sea Corps (lived in Neve Eitan).
