= Ilan Shiloah =

Israeli businessman (born 1957)

- אילן שילוח
- Born: 1957 (age 68–69); Maoz Haim
- Citizenship: Israel
- Education: Tel Aviv University
- Spouse: Shira Margalit

Ilan Shiloah (also anglicised as Shiloach; Hebrew: אילן שילוח) is an Israeli businessman. He is the former CEO and chairman of McCann Erickson-Kesher-Barel, Israel's largest advertising firm. He is the chairman of The Time; a technology startups investment company. During 2003-2011, Shiloah served on the Executive Board of McCann Erickson EMEA. Since he sold his holdings in 2011, he has served as a board member at McCann TLV.

== Biography ==
Ilan Shiloah was born in Maoz Haim, a kibbutz in northern Israel. Drafted into the army in 1977, he served in the Special Forces unit Sayeret Matkal. After completing his service, Shiloah obtained a BA in Economics & Management from Tel Aviv University. He also earned his MBA there.

Shiloah is twice divorced and has four daughters. He is married to Shira Margalit, daughter of Dan Margalit. Shiloah lives in Tel Aviv.

== Business career ==
In 1995, Shiloah was appointed as the CEO of Kesher-Barel, which later became McCann Erickson Israel (now part of McCann WorldGroup). Between the years 2009-2011 Shiloah sold his shares in the company to the global McCann Erickson Worldgroup.

Shiloah is the co-founder, major shareholder and chairman of The Time; an investment company founded in 2009 focusing on young innovative technology startups in the areas of new media (T.I.M.E).

In 2015, Channel 10, of which Shiloah was a minority shareholder, entered financial difficulties and Shiloah attempted to take full control of the broadcaster in return for taking on the existing debts of around NIS 200 million. Shiloah's offer was rejected in favour of an offer by Recanati Giladi Entertainment.

Shiloah is chairman of Silenseed, a clinical-stage biopharmaceutical company.
