= Shmuel Tankus =

Israeli Navy commander

Shmuel "Shmulik" Tankus
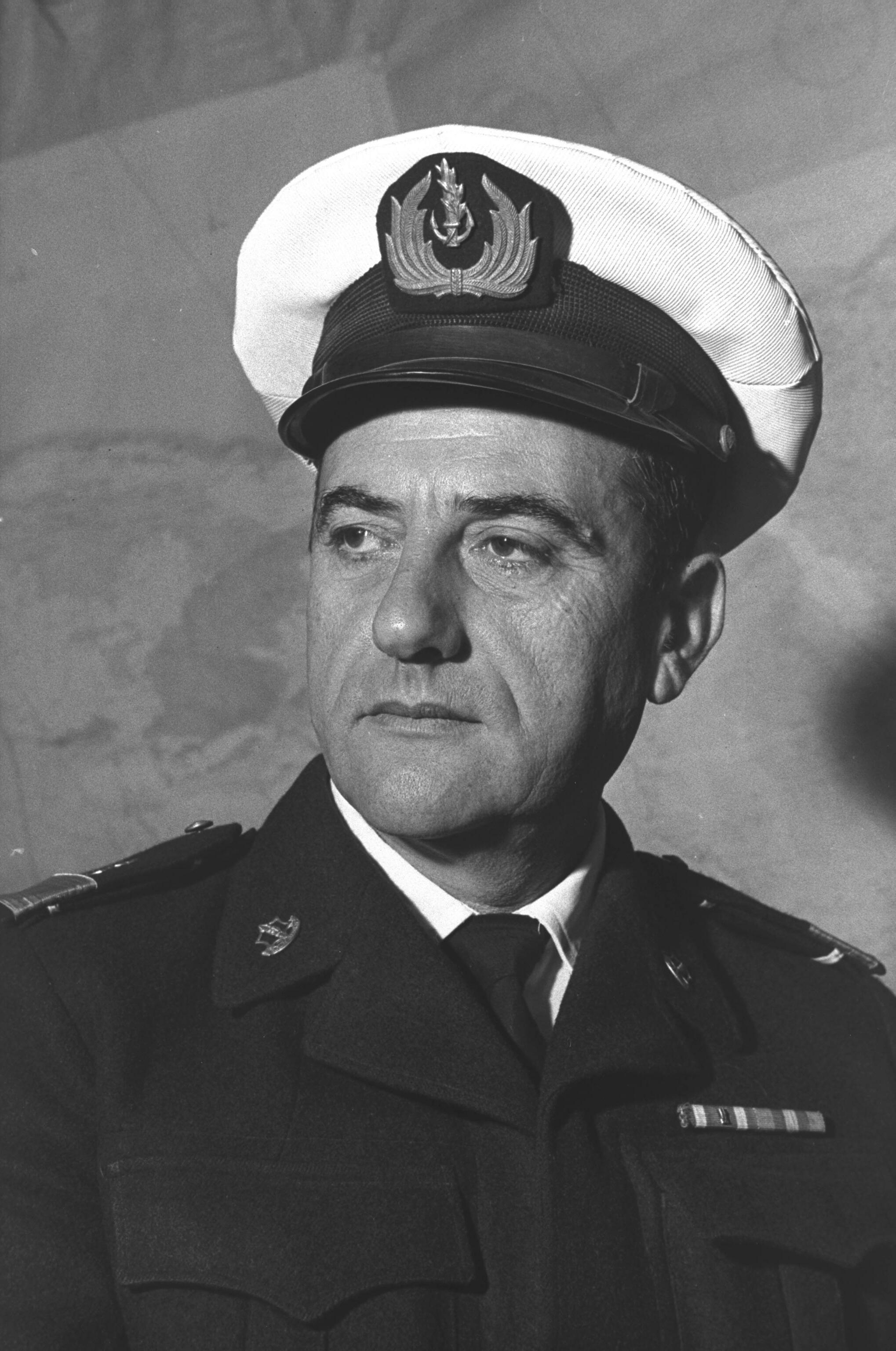
- Tankus in 1960
- Native name: שמואל טנקוס
- Born: 4 November 1914; Jaffa, Ottoman-controlled Palestine
- Died: 4 March 2012 (aged 97)
- Allegiance: Israel
- Branch: Israeli Navy
- Service years: 1930–1960
- Rank: Aluf
- Commands: Commander of the Israeli Navy
- Conflicts: World War II; 1947–1949 Palestine war Suez Crisis

Aluf (Rear Admiral) Shmuel "Shmulik" Tankus (Hebrew: שמואל טנקוס; 14 November 1914 – 4 March 2012) was the fifth commander of the Israeli Navy, serving from 30 June 1954 until 1960.

Tankus was born in 1914 in the Neve Shalom district of Jaffa under Ottoman-controlled Palestine. He was scion to a clan from the Caucasus that had settled in Palestine following a vision by the clan's elder. He studied at The Herzliya Hebrew Gymnasium in Tel Aviv

He joined the Palmach, and served in Palyam. He reported to Yohai Ben-Nun, who was Commander of the Port Brigade (Hebrew: מפקדי פלוגת הנמל) and is considered the father of the Israeli Naval Academy.

In 1942, he married Yafa Grobshtein. They had a daughter, Ruth, who volunteered for service in the Navy. He lived in Haifa from 1952 onwards. In 2001, he was accorded the honour of Friend or Beloved of the municipality.
