= Palmach =

Jewish paramilitary in Mandatory Palestine

- פלמ״ח
- Symbol of the Palmach
- Active: 1941–1948
- Country: Mandatory Palestine (before 14 May 1948); Israel (after 14 May 1948)
- Type: Combined strike forces
- Part of: Haganah
- Mottos: "Always at your command" "לפקודה תמיד אנחנו"

Commanders
- Notable commanders: Yitzhak Sadeh, Yigal Allon, Yitzhak Rabin, Moshe Dayan

The Palmach (Hebrew: פלמ״ח, acronym for פלוגות מחץ, Plugot Maḥatz, "Strike Phalanges/Companies") was the elite combined strike forces and sayeret unit of the Haganah, the main military organization of the Yishuv (pre-1948 Jewish community in Palestine) during the period of the British Mandate. The Palmach was established in May 1941. By the outbreak of the 1948 Arab–Israeli War, it consisted of over 2,000 men and women in three fighting brigades and auxiliary aerial, naval and intelligence units. With the creation of the Israel Defense Forces, the three Palmach Brigades were disbanded. This and political reasons compelled many of the senior Palmach officers to resign in 1950.

The Palmach contributed significantly to Israeli culture and ethos, well beyond its military contribution. Its members formed the backbone of the Israel Defense Forces high command for many years, and were prominent in Israeli politics, literature and culture.

== Establishment ==
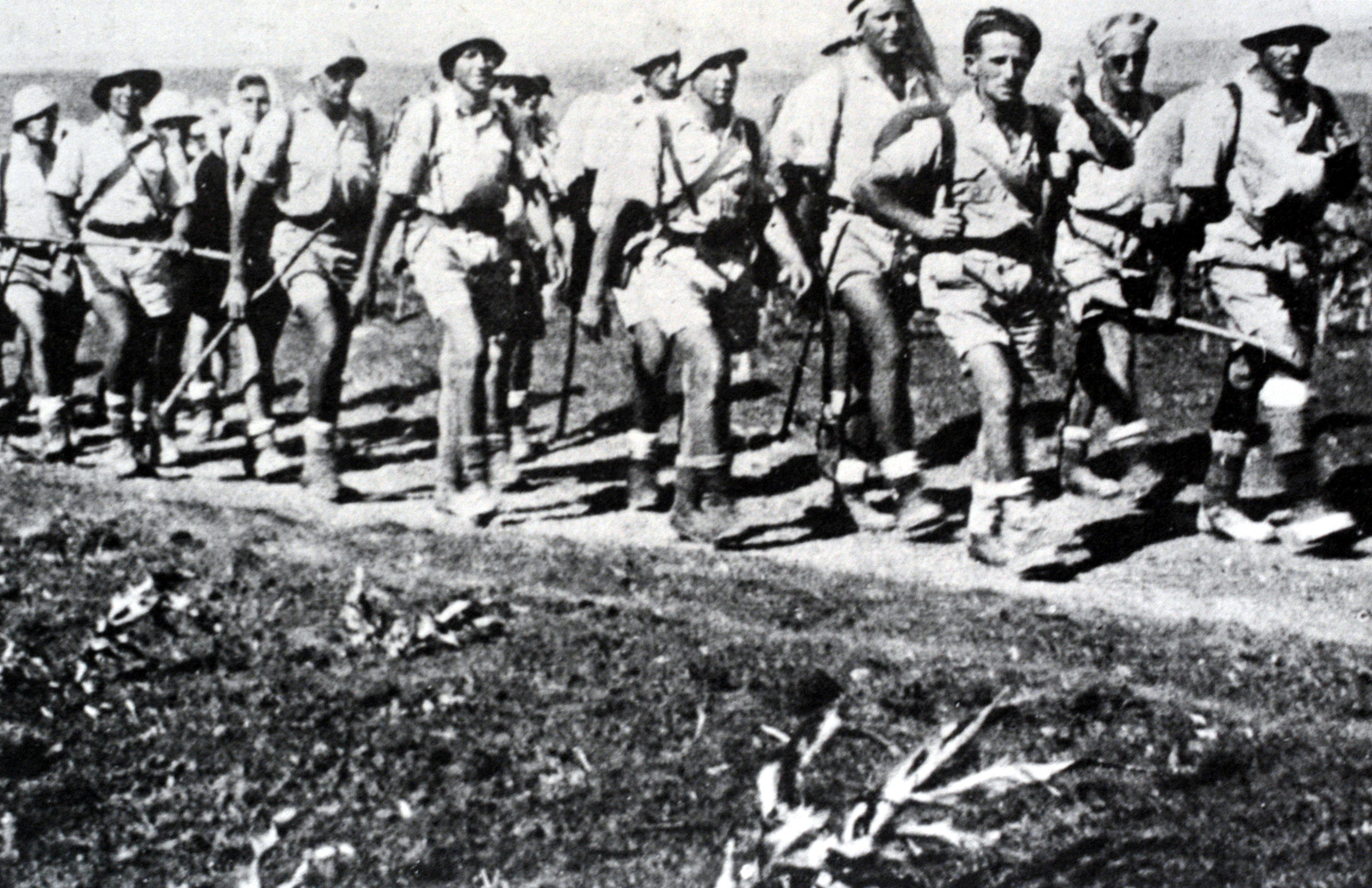
"The German squad" of the Palmach on a training march.

The Palmach was established by the Haganah High Command in May 1941. Its aim was to defend the Palestinian Jewish community against two potential threats. Firstly the occupation of Palestine by the Axis in the event of their victory over the British in North Africa. Secondly, if the British army were to retreat from Palestine, Jewish settlements might come under attack from the Arab population. Yitzhak Sadeh was named as Palmach commander. Initially the group consisted of around one hundred men. In the early summer of 1941 the British military authorities agreed to joint operations against Vichy French forces in Lebanon and Syria. The first action was a sabotage mission (Operation Boatswain) against oil installations at Tripoli, Lebanon. Twenty-three Palmach members and a British liaison officer set out by sea but were never heard of again.

Palmach commandos were utilized for the Syria–Lebanon campaign. Prior to the campaign, Arabic-speaking Palmach personnel were sent in to gather intelligence and mine key bridges. Immediately before the campaign began, two Palmach companies were sent in to perform last-minute reconnaissance and divided into twelve squads. They cut wires, ambushed Vichy troops guarding bridges over the Litani River, destroyed culverts, and sabotaged roads. After the Allied invasion began they acted as guides to Australian forces. The success of these operations led the British GHQ to fund a sabotage training camp for three hundred men at Mishmar HaEmek. Since the Palmach consisted of unpaid volunteers, the funding was used to cover the needs of twice that number of men. When the British ordered the dismantling of Palmach after the Allied victory at the Second Battle of El Alamein in 1942, the organization went underground.

== Underground ==
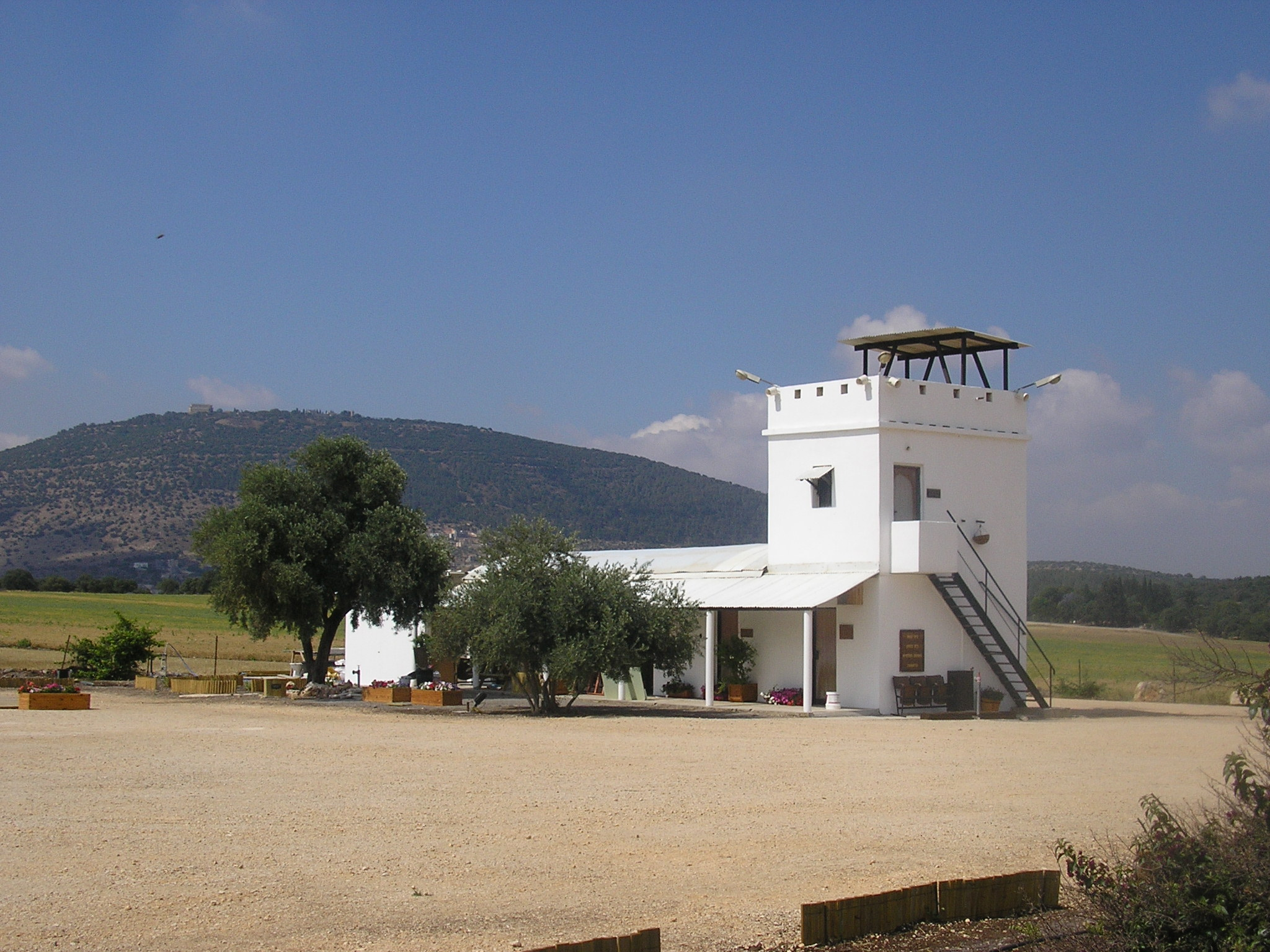
Beit Keshet, First Palmach outpost, 1944

Since British funding had stopped, Yitzhak Tabenkin, head of the kibbutz union HaKibbutz HaMeuhad, suggested the Palmach could be self-funding by having its members work in the kibbutzim. Each kibbutz would host a Palmach platoon and supply them with food, homes and resources. In return the platoon would safeguard the kibbutz and carry out work such as agricultural work. The proposal was accepted in August 1942, when it was also decided that each month Palmach members would have eight training days, 14 work days and seven days off. The program of combined military training, agricultural work and Zionist education was called "Hach'shara Meguyeset" הכשרה מגויסת (meaning "Drafted/Recruited Training"). Later, Zionist youth movements offered members aged 18–20 an opportunity to join core groups (gar'in) for agricultural settlement that became the basis for the Nahal.

Basic training included physical fitness, small arms, mêlée and KAPAP, basic marine training, topography, first aid and squad operations. Most of the Palmach members received advanced training in one or more of the following areas: sabotage and explosives, reconnaissance, sniping, communications and radio, light and medium machine guns, and operating 2-inch and 3-inch mortars. Platoon training included long marches, combined live-fire drills with artillery support and machine guns and mortars.

The Palmach put great emphasis on training independent and broadminded field commanders who would take the initiative and set an example for their troops. It trained squad commanders and company commanders. The major commanders training course was in the Palmach and many Haganah commanders were sent to be trained in the Palmach. The Palmach commanders' course was the source for many field commanders, who were the backbone of Haganah and, later, the Israel Defense Forces.

== Postwar operations ==
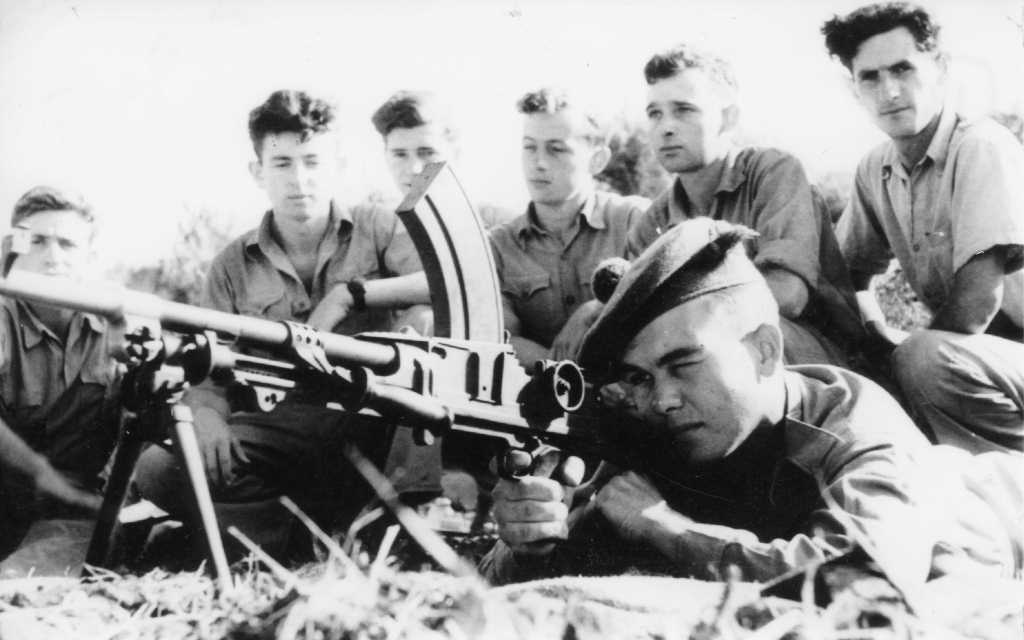
Small arms training of B Company

For seven months after the assassination of Lord Moyne by Lehi in 1944, members of the Palmach under the command of Shimon Avidan were involved in the Saison activities, in which they cooperated with the British in an attempt to crush the Irgun and Lehi. However, with David Ben-Gurion's decision, 1 October 1945, to launch an armed struggle against the British, the Palmach entered an alliance with the dissident groups, called The Hebrew Resistance Movement. On 10 October 1945 a force led by Yitzhak Rabin raided the prison at Atlit freeing 208 Jewish prisoners. The first joint operation took place on 31 October 1945 when the Palmach sank three British patrol boats, 2 in Haifa and one in Jaffa, and were involved in 153 bomb attacks on bridges and culverts of the railway system.

On the night of 22 February 1946, the Palmach attacked the police Tegart fort at Shefa-'Amr with a 200-pound bomb; in the firefight that followed, the Palmach suffered casualties. In June 1946 the Palmach blew up ten of the eleven bridges connecting Palestine to its neighbouring countries. Fourteen Palmach members were killed during the attack on Achziv Bridge.

The alliance was never completely under Haganah control and the Irgun launched a series of ever more ruthless attacks culminating in the King David Hotel bombing. This attack was the Irgun's response to a British crackdown, "Black Sabbath", launched on 29 June 1946. A combination of the crackdown and the Jewish civilian leadership's outrage at the King David attack led Ben-Gurion to call off further Palmach operations.

=== Retaliation raids ===
After a gap of over ten months the Palmach resumed operations. The one weapon of which there was no shortage was locally produced explosives. On 20 May 1947 they blew up a coffee house in Fajja, specifically in retaliation for the murder of two Jews in nearby Petah Tikva. Following the escalation of violence after the UN Partition Resolution the scale of the retaliation operations increased.

On 18 December 1947, in an operation approved by Palmach commander Yigal Allon, several houses were blown up in al-Khisas, near the Lebanese border; a dozen civilians were killed. On 31 December 1947 170 men from the Palmach launched an attack on Balad al-Sheikh, Haifa, in retaliation for the killing of 47 Jews at the Haifa oil refinery. Several dozen houses were destroyed and 60-70 villagers were killed.

Around Jaffa, Palmach units destroyed houses in Yazur and Salama. An order dated 3 January 1948 said "The aim is ... to attack northern part of the village of Salama ... to cause deaths, to blow up houses and to burn everything possible." In the Upper Galilee, the Palmach's third Battalion commanded by Moshe Kelman, attacked Sa'sa', 15 February, and blew up ten houses, killing 11 villagers. Further north, they raided al-Husayniyya, 16 March 1948, in retaliation for a land mine, they blew up five houses and killed "30 Arab adults". In the Northern Negev, 4 April 1948, a Palmach unit in two armoured cars destroyed "nine bedouin lay-bys and one mud hut" after a mine attack on a Jewish Patrol.

During this period, in the event known as the Convoy of 35, the Palmach lost 18 men (along with 17 other Haganah fighters) on their way to reinforce the garrison at Kfar Etzion after they were attacked by hundreds of Arab locals and militias. The bodies of the Palmach and Haganah fighters were mutilated to the point that some of them could not be recognized.

=== A change in objectives ===
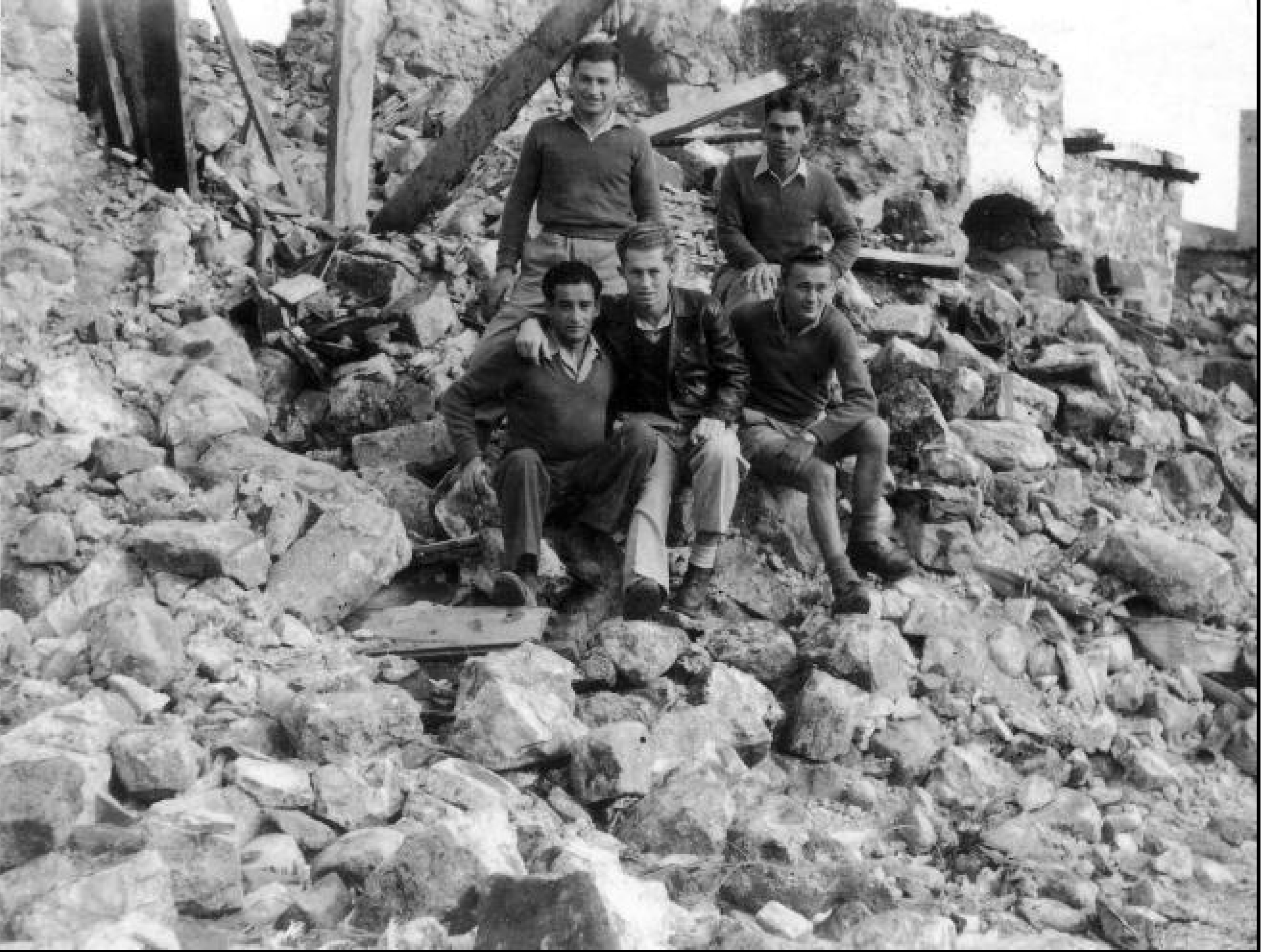
Palmach sappers in the ruins of a village, 1948

On 20 February 1948 the Palmach launched an operation in Caesarea, North of Tel Aviv, in which they demolished 30 houses, six were left standing due to lack of explosives. The objective was to prevent them being occupied by British troops as a base against illegal immigrants. Yitzhak Rabin opposed the attack. Although occupied by Arabs the buildings were Jewish owned.

With the activation of Plan D and its sub-operations Palmach units were used to demolish villages with the objective of preventing them being used by Palestinian irregulars or the Arab Liberation Army (ALA) as bases.

=== Operation Nachshon ===
Following the attempt to clear the road to Jerusalem, Palmach units "more or less systematically leveled the villages of al-Qastal, Qalinya, Khuda and largely or partly destroyed Beit Surik, Biddu, Shu'fat, Beit Iksa, Beit Mahsir and Sheikh Jarrah (Jerusalem)".

On 9 April a Palmach unit with mortars took part in the Irgun attack on Deir Yassin.

=== Mishmar Ha'amek ===
Following the failed ALA attack on the Haganah base at Mishmar Ha'amek, and the Haganah's refusal of an offer of a truce, Haganah and Palmach troops counterattacked. Between 8 and 14 April, ten villages came under Palmach's control. Within two weeks they were leveled.

=== Operation Yiftach and the conquest of Safad ===
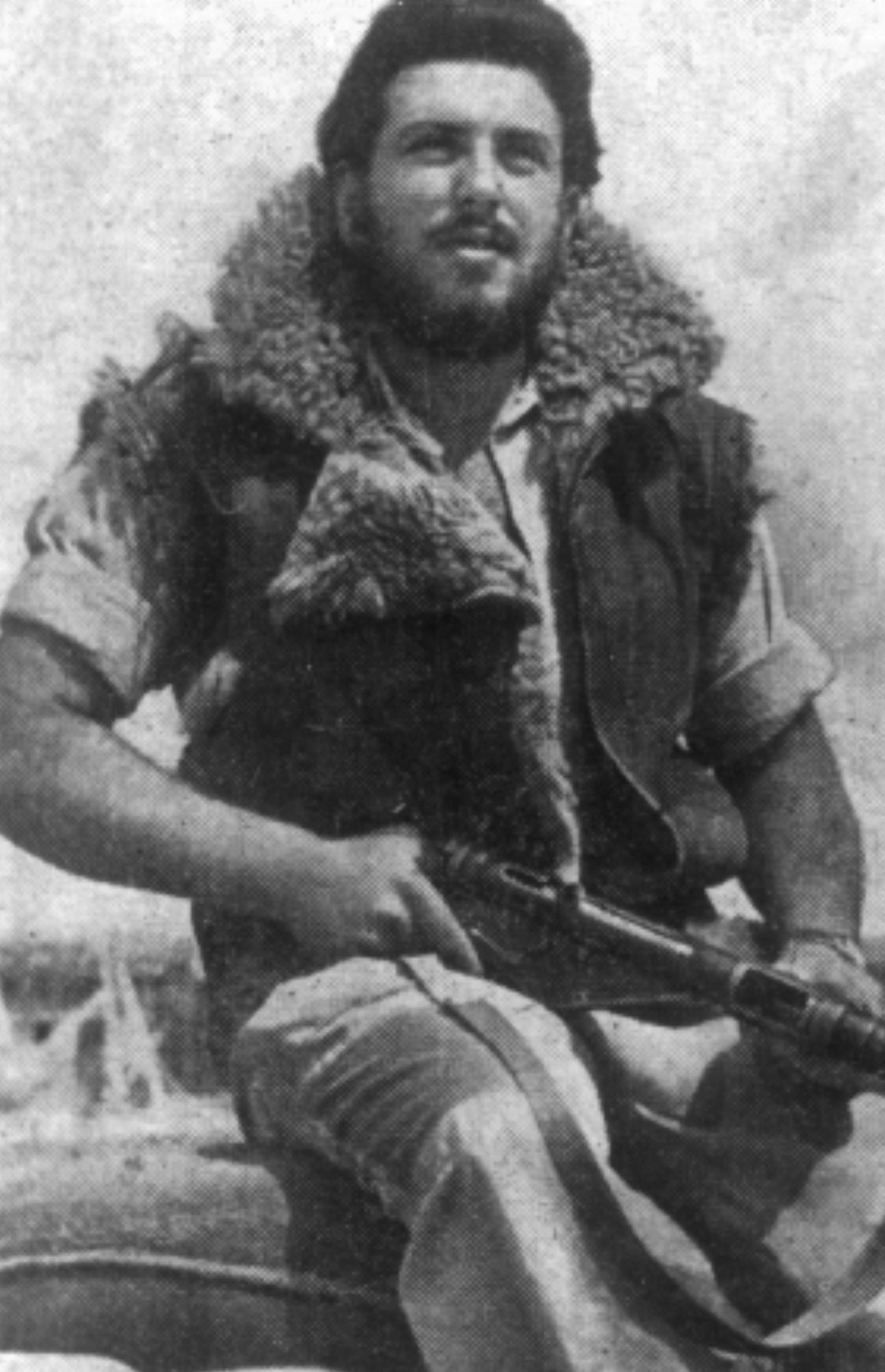
Palmach soldier on guard

On 2 May, the Palmach 3rd Battalion, commanded by Moshe Kelman, attacked Ein al-Zeitun with a Davidka, two 3-inch mortars and eight 2-inch mortars. During the following two days Palmach sappers blew up and burned all the houses. In the aftermath of the capture of this village Battalion Commander Kelman ordered the execution of seventy prisoners.

On 6 May the Palmach launched an attack on Safad. It failed to capture the citadel and the Palmach had to withdraw. The defenders offered a cease-fire, which Allon refused. A second attack was launched on 9 May. This was preceded by a "massive concentrated barrage" using mortars and Davidkas. The empty Arab quarter of Safad was occupied on 11 May. Between 12,000 and 15,000 refugees had been created.

The Palmach suffered 69 killed during Operation Yiftah.

In May 1948 the Palmach had 2,200 permanently mobilised members. A different source puts the size of the Palmach as 3,000 at the end of November 1947, and, following the mobilization of 3,000 reserves, five battalions were formed by May 1948, consisting of 5,000 fighters of whom 1,200 were women.

Palmach units took a major part in the 1948 Arab–Israeli War. At the beginning of the war, Palmach units were responsible for holding Jewish settlements (such as Gush Etzion, Kfar Darom and Revivim) against Arab militias. Although inferior in numbers and arms, Palmach soldiers held out long enough to allow the Haganah to mobilise the Jewish population and prepare for war.

=== The creation of the Israeli Army ===
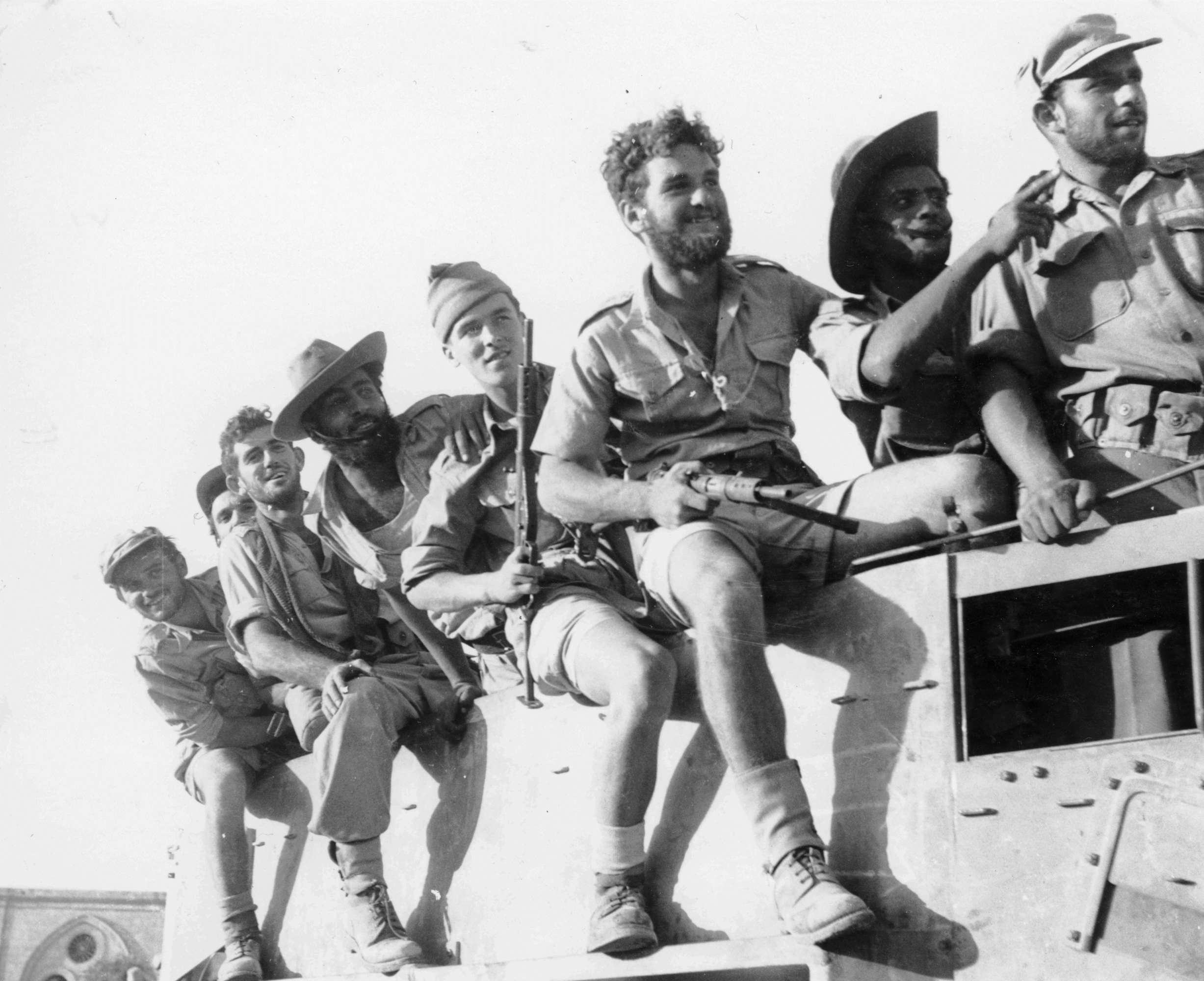
The 9th Battalion of the Negev Brigade after the conquest of Beersheba

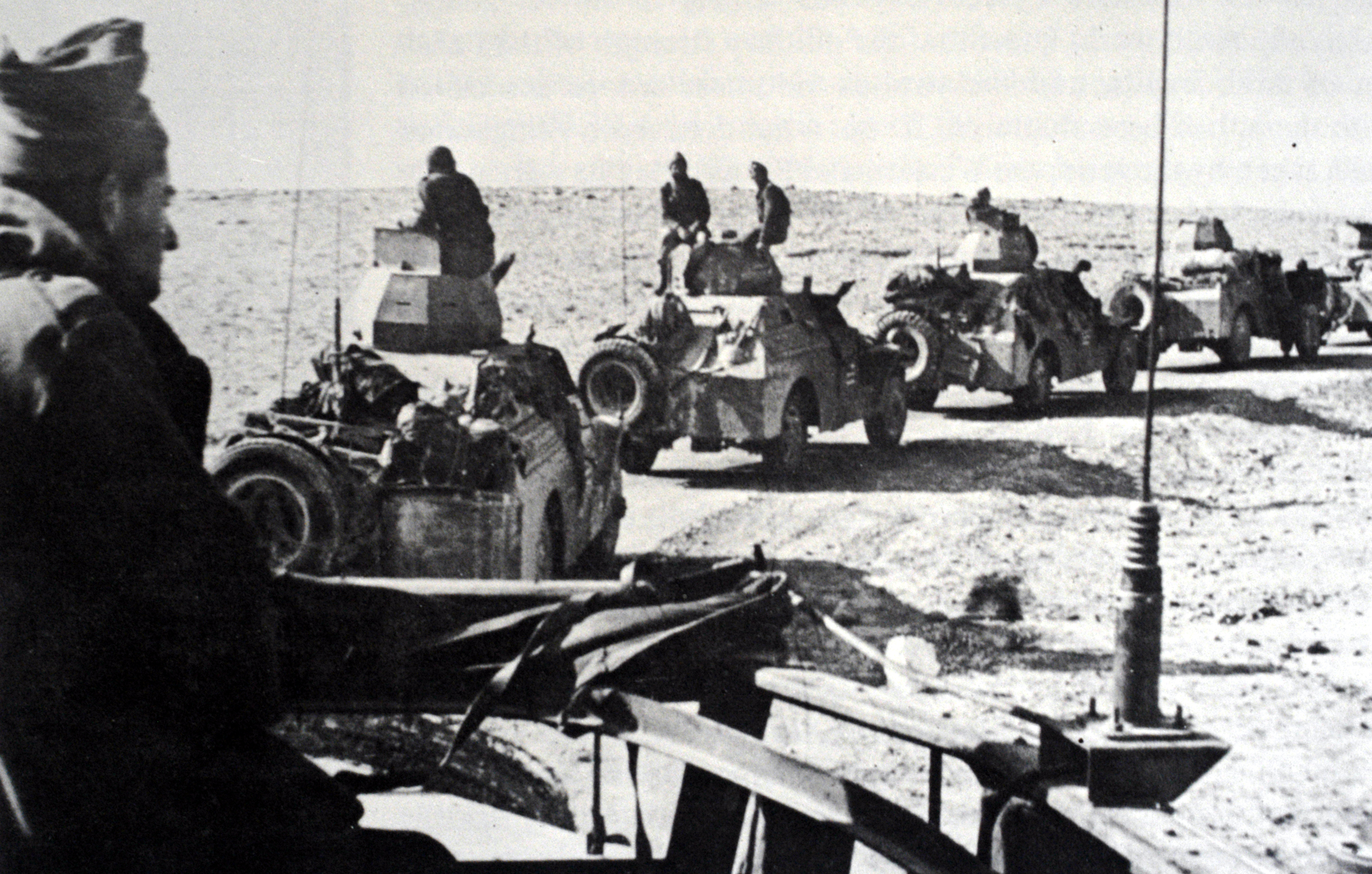
A Palmach patrol in the Negev

The Palmach's last operation as an independent unit was against the Irgun, in the Altalena Affair. On 22 June 1948 the Irgun moored the Altalena, loaded with weapons, off Tel Aviv. Ben-Gurion ordered the Palmach to prevent the arms being landed. In an operation commanded by Yigal Allon, with Yitzhak Rabin as his deputy, a cannon was used to sink the ship. One member of the Palmach and fourteen members of the Irgun were killed.

After the establishment of the Israeli army, the Palmach was reorganised into three IDF brigades—the Negev Brigade, the Yiftach Brigade, and the Harel Brigade. The Negev and Yiftah Brigades fought in the Negev against the Egyptian army and managed to stop and later repulse it into the Gaza Strip and Sinai. The Yiftah Brigade was later transferred to the north. The Harel Brigade was centered on Jerusalem. The merging of the Palmach into the Israeli army involved a series of power struggles with Ben-Gurion, known as The Generals' Revolt. In 1949 many senior members of the Palmach resigned from the army.

In total, the Palmach lost 1,187 fighters during the war of independence and in the years prior to Israel's creation.

=== Casualties ===
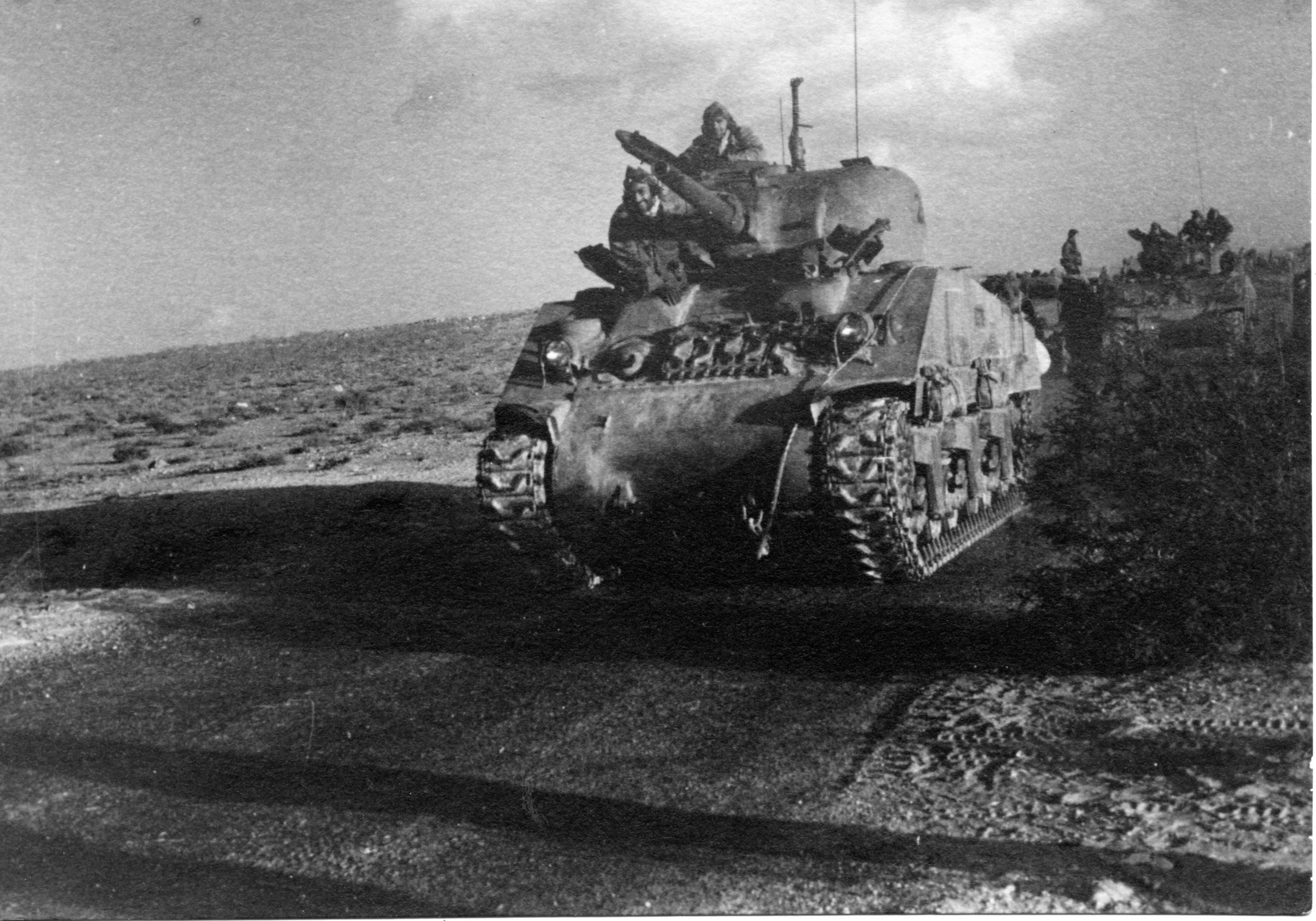
Palmach M4 Sherman tank leading a convoy

The Palmach memorial site records 37 deaths of Palmach members between May 1941 and May 1945. Thirty-one are described as killed in action, six were killed while serving in the British Army and six were killed in the "Struggle against the British Government".

A further 39 members of the Palmach died between the May 1945 and November 1947. Twenty-one are recorded as killed in action and one killed in battle, fourteen being killed during the attempt to blow up the Achziv Bridge during the Night of the Bridges. Twenty-eight died in the struggle against the British.

Between the beginning of December 1947 and the end of May 1948, when the Israeli army was created, 574 deaths are listed, of whom 524 were killed in action or in battle; 77 while on convoy duty or securing roads; 59 during Operation Yevusi, including 34 at Nabi Samuel; 20 during Operation Nachshon, all at al-Qastal; 68 during Operation Yiftach; 12 at Mishmar HaEmek. By district 171 members of the Palmach were killed in Jerusalem and the surrounding area, 104 in and around Gush Etzion, 103 in the Galilee and 81 in the Negev.

From June 1948 to December 1949, during which time the Palmach was absorbed into the army, 527 members died, 452 killed in action or in battle; 101 were killed during Operation Danny, including 45 at Khirbet Kurikur; 53 during Operation Yoav; 44 in Operation Horev and 22 during Operation Death to the Invader. By district 234 died in the Negev and Southern Plain; 62 in Jerusalem and surrounds; 44 around Latrun; 42 in the Gaza Strip and 41 in the Central Plain and Coastal Strip.

By Brigade, 313 members of the Harel Brigade were killed, 312 from the Negev and 274 from the Yiftach. One of the dead is listed as also being a member of the Lehi.

The Palmach memorial site records the death of 34 female members, seventeen killed in action or in battle.

Around 520 of the fatalities had been born in Palestine; of whom 117 were from Tel Aviv, 97 from Jerusalem and 56 from Haifa. Over 550 had been born in Europe and Russia; with 181 from Poland, 99 from Germany and 95 from Romania. Another 131 of the dead originated from Arab and Muslim countries; 32 from Turkey, 23 from Syria and 21 from the Yemen. Of the remainder 13 had been born in the USA.

Of the dead, 633 were aged between 18 and 22 years, 302 were between 22 and 25, 138 were 26 and over, and 91 were under 18 years of age.

== Military organization ==
The Palmach was organised into regular companies (12 in total), later merged into battalions, and five or six special units. The companies were enumerated by the consecutive letters of the Hebrew alphabet and when translating into English some enumerated them by numbers and some by the consecutive Latin letters:

- Pluga Aleph (Company One or A)
- Pluga Beth (Company Two or B)
- Pluga Gimel (Company Three or C)
- Pluga Daled (Company Four or D)
- Pluga He (Company Five or E)
- Pluga Vav (Company Six or F)
- Pluga Zayin (Company Seven or G, sometimes one may see "Company Z", from "Zayin")
- Pluga Het (Company Eight or H)
- Pluga Tet (Company Nine or I)
- Pluga Yud – Hapluga Hayamit (Company Ten or J – the Naval Company, see Palyam)
- Pluga Yud-Alef (Company Eleven or K)
- Pluga Yud-Beit (Company Twelve or L)

Palmach special units included:

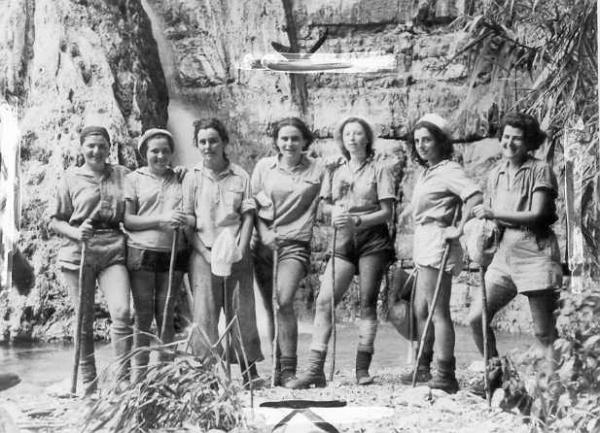
Women of the Palmach at Ein Gedi, 1942

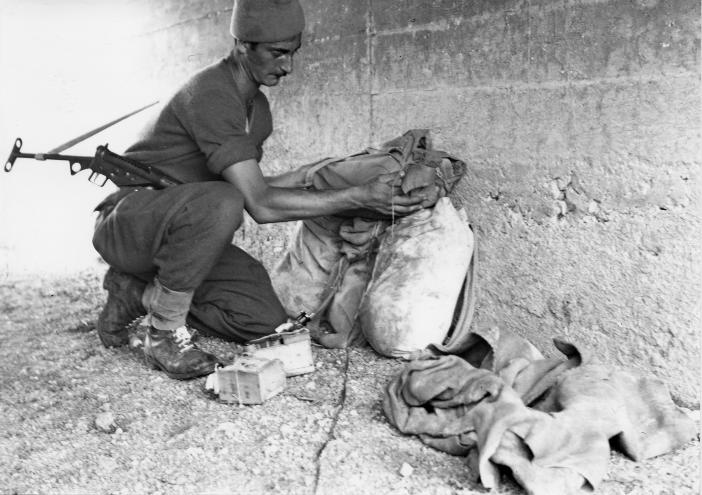
Palmach sapper preparing explosives under bridge in Wadi Serer, 1948.

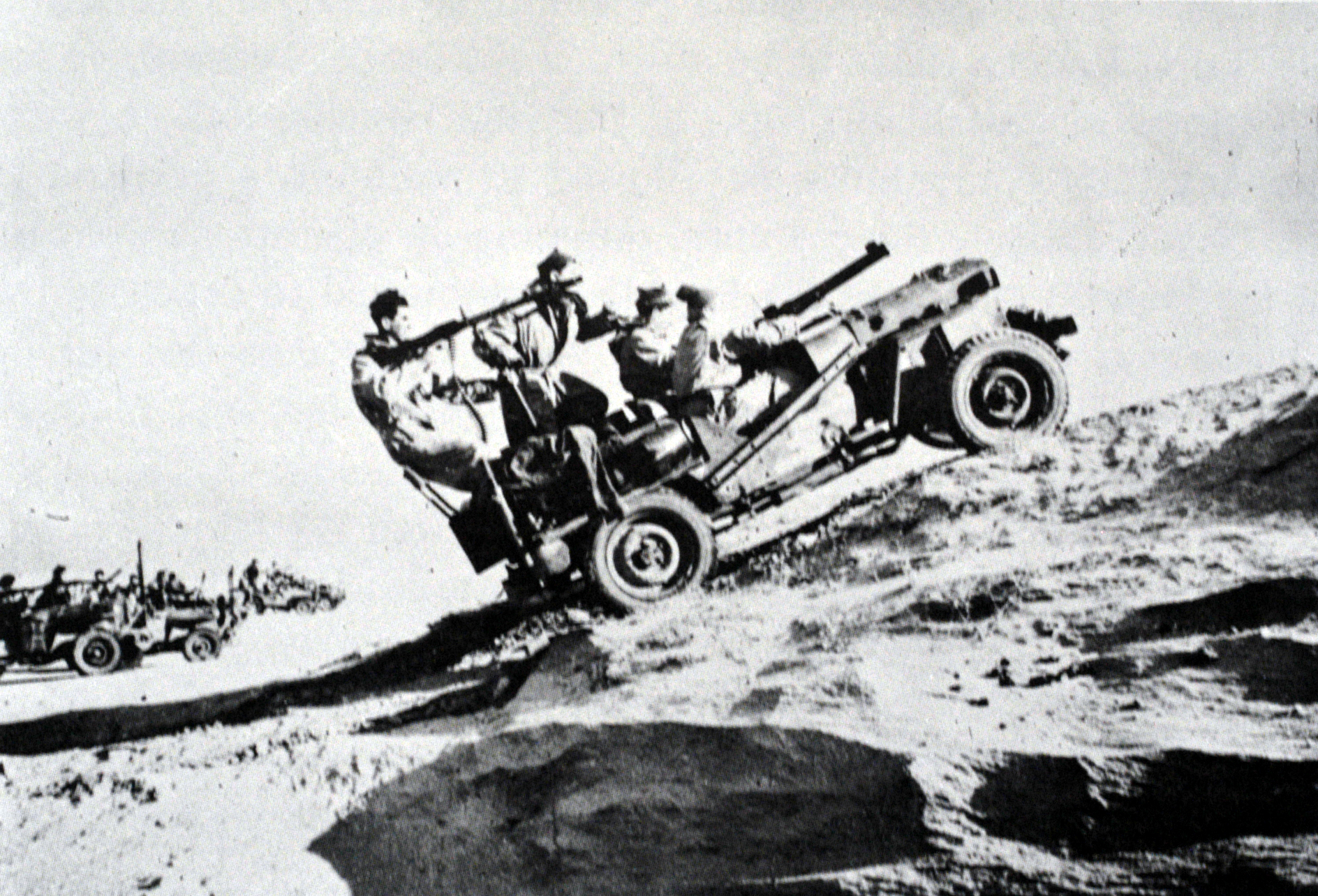
Negev Beasts

- Ha-Machlaka Ha-Germanit: the German Platoon (aka the Middle East Commando) performed covert operations and sabotage operations against Nazi infrastructure in the Middle East and the Balkans.
- Ha-Machlaka Ha-Aravit: the Arab Platoon performed covert operations and espionage missions against Arab militias, which frequently attacked Jewish settlements. It was the base for the Israeli Defense Forces's and the Israeli Border Police's Mista'arvim units.
- Palyam (Sea Companies): the naval force of the Palmach was formed in 1943, attached to the Palmach's Staff Battalion (the 4th Battalion). They were in charge of underwater demolition and maritime activity units. The majority of their activities were related to the escorting of ships of Aliyah Bet, immigration ships (66 of them in all) bringing Jewish refugees from Europe by boat, despite the British White Paper of 1939, which introduced restrictions on Jewish immigration to Palestine.
- Palavir (The Air Companies): made up of Jewish pilots, the Palmach air force was incorporated into the Sherut Avir (predecessor of the Israeli Air Force) upon the Sherut's foundation in late 1947. Eighteen Taylorcraft Auster Mk V aircraft and two Mk IIIs were purchased by Aviron from RAF scrapheap at Tel Nof 14 January 1947, with at least 13 aircraft restored to flying condition. First delivered late Feb 1948, these were used by the Palavir's, Tel Aviv, Galilee and Negev Squadrons for supply, reconnaissance and light attack roles.
- Sabotage Units: explosives experts who became the basis for the Israeli Engineering Corps in the IDF.

The Palmach put an emphasis on training field commanders (מפקדי שטח) and formed the basis for the Israeli army.

During the 1948 Arab–Israeli War the Palmach was expanded to form three infantry brigades commanded by Yigal Allon:

- Negev Brigade, March 1948, with four battalions (2nd, 7th, 8th and 9th) The 9th one had jeep mounted company nicknamed "Negev Beasts"
- Harel Brigade, April 16, 1948; with three battalions operating (4th, 5th and 6th) in the Jerusalem area commanded by Yitzhak Rabin (then age 26)
- Yiftach Brigade, end of 1948 with three battalions operating in Eastern Galilee (1st and 3rd and later 2nd, moved from the Negev Brigade)

The Command Battalion controlled naval, air and commando companies.

The battle cry of the Palmach commander was "!אחרי" (Aharai), which literally means "after me!" or "follow me!". It refers to the commander leading his troops instead of sending them out and staying behind.

== In politics ==
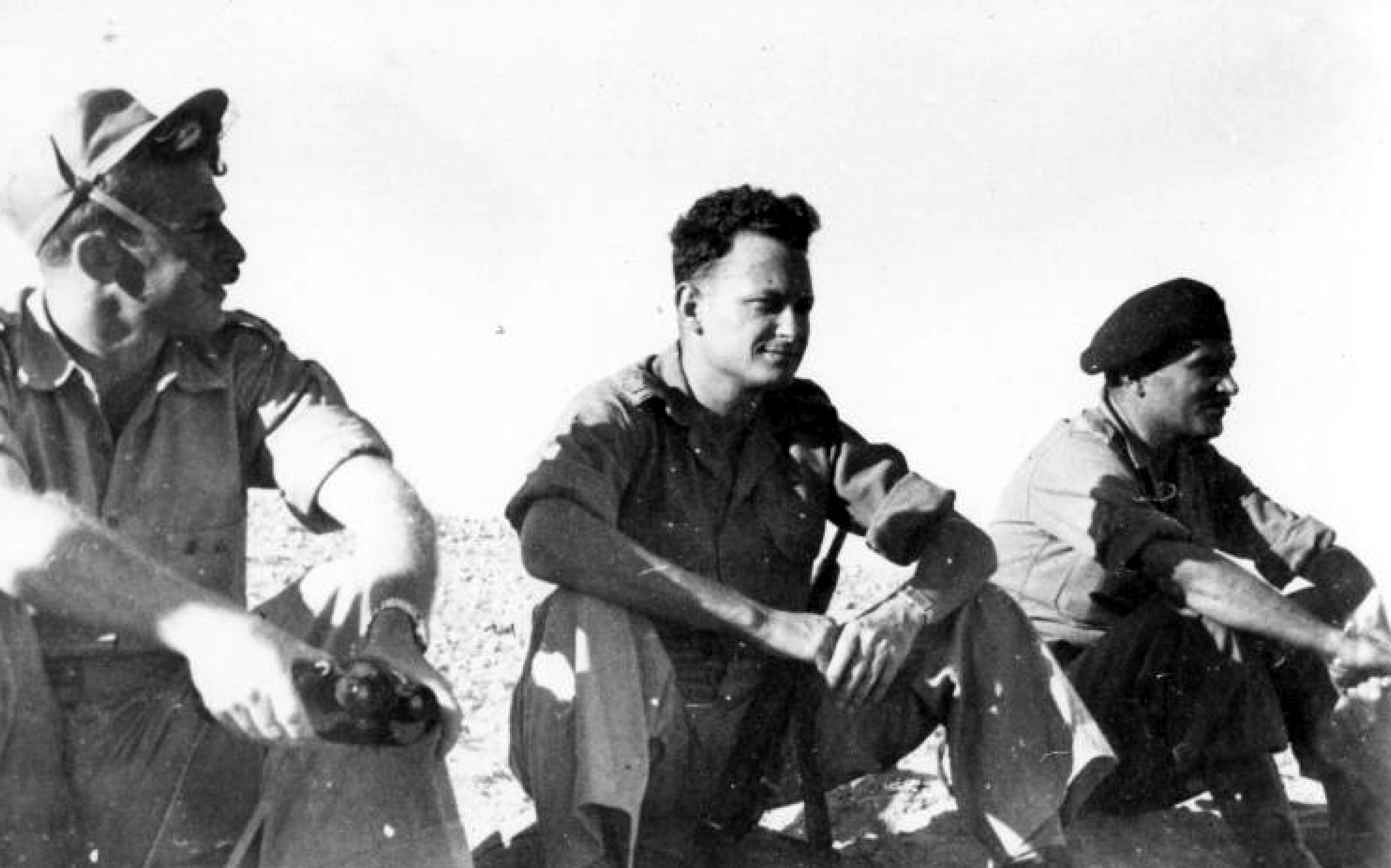
Yigal Allon, Commander of Southern Front, watches the bombardment of Iraq Suwaydan, 9 November 1948

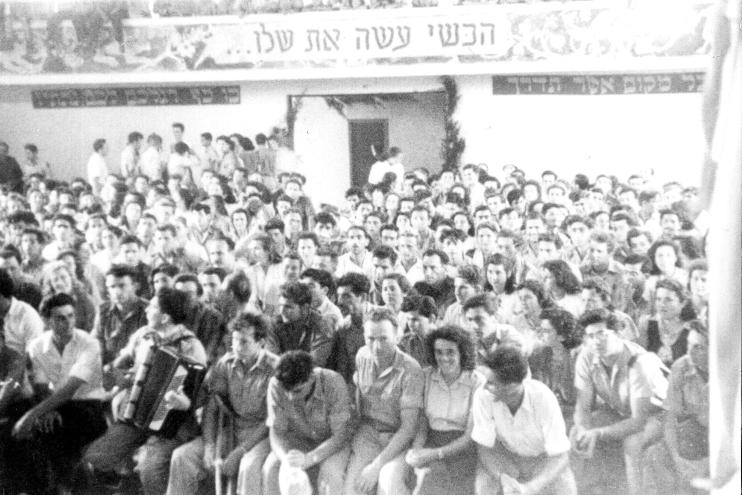
Members of 3rd Battalion gathered in Safed prior to the dissolution of the Palmach in 1949

The Palmach was a broad spectrum left-wing nationalist organisation, associated with socialist parties. Its members trained and lived in kibbutzim. The political tendencies of its leaders such as Yigal Allon and Yitzhak Sadeh was towards Mapam, a left-wing party in opposition to David Ben-Gurion and the Mapai ruling party. In 1944 a major split had occurred in Palestine's Jewish community's dominant party, Mapai, led by David Ben-Gurion. The breakaway group Ahdut HaAvoda, which evolved into Mapam, were inspired by Stalin's regime in the Soviet Union, and had a strong following in the kibbutz movement. Since most of the Palmach's members came from the kibbutzim, the Mapam dominated the Palmach, with a majority of its officers being members. After 1948 Ben-Gurion, Prime Minister and Minister of Defence of the new state, had a series of confrontations with leaders of the Haganah and the Palmach. In a process that Ben-Gurion described as de-politicizing the army, the three Palmach brigades were disbanded and in 1950 most of the Mapam officers resigned. Those Palmach members who had been in Mapam and remained in the army had to endure several years on the margins. The effect of the de-politicizing was that all senior army posts were held by Mapai members or Ben-Gurion loyalists. After demobilization many Palmach members founded new kibbutzim. In 1949 they set up Bar'am, Beit Guvrin, Nir Yitzhak (named in honour of Yitzhak Sadeh), Palmachim, Re'im, Rosh HaNikra, Re'im and Yir'on. Palmach members were not, however, a unified, homogeneous collective with a single ideology. In the early years of the state of Israel they could be found in all political parties.

Yigal Allon, considered by many to be the representative of the Palmach generation, never reached a position of national leadership although he was Prime Minister for a few days between Eshkol's death and Meir's appointment in 1969. He died in 1980.

== In culture ==
Besides military contributions, the Palmach had great influence over the Israeli "Tzabar" culture.

Palmach activities included "Kumzitz" (sitting around a fire at night, eating, passing a "finjan" with coffee around, talking and having fun, as immortalized in the song The Finjan, lyrics by Haim Hefer), public singing, and cross-country walking trips. These often took on mythical proportions and have become favorite activities for Israelis.

The Palmach also contributed many anecdotes, jokes, "chizbat" (short funny tales, often based on exaggerations; a Palmach entertainment band Chizbatron took the name from this word), songs and even books and stories.

Notable Palmach cultural figures include:

- Yehuda Amichai – poet
- Dahn Ben-Amotz – writer, journalist
- Gad Avigad – scientist
- Netiva Ben-Yehuda – journalist, writer, radio host
- Haim Hefer – poet, writer
- Haim Gouri – poet, writer
- Shaike Ophir – actor
- Moshe Shamir – writer, playwright
- Hannah Szenes (Senesh) – poet
- Vidal Sassoon – British hairdresser

=== Palmach song ===
Full text of the song:

Hebrew original

מסביב יהום הסער,
אך ראשינו לא ישח
לפקודה תמיד אנחנו,
תמיד אנו, אנו הפלמ״ח.

ממטולה עד הנגב,
מן הים עד המדבר
כל בחור וטוב – לנשק
כל בחור על המישמר!

נתיב לנשר בשמיים,
שביל לפרא בין הרים,
מול אויב דרכנו יעל,
בין ניקרות ובין צורים.

ראשונים תמיד אנחנו,
לאור היום ובמחשך
לפקודה תמיד אנחנו,
תמיד אנו, אנו הפלמ״ח.

English translation

Though the storm is ever mounting
Still, our heads remain unbowed.
We are ready to obey all commands,
The Palmach will win – we've vowed.

From Metulla to the Negev,
From the desert to the plain,
All our youth defend the homeland,
Till we bring it peace again.

In the eagle's path, we follow,
Over mountain tracks, we go,
Among stony heights and caverns
We are seeking out the foe.

When you summon us to battle,
We will be there first by day or night,
We are ready when you give the command,
The Palmach will march in might.

=== Palmach Museum ===
The Palmach Museum, located on Chaim Levanon Street in Tel Aviv, near the Eretz Israel Museum, explores the Palmach legacy through the stories of individuals and groups. Visitors to the museum join the group of young Palmach recruits from its establishment, and advanced through the story of the Palmach until the end of the 1948 Arab-Israeli War.

== Notable Palmachniks ==
High command

- Eliyahu Golomb – general commander of Haganah
- Yitzhak Sadeh – first general commander of Palmach
- Yigal Allon – second general commander of Palmach (1945–1948)
- Giora Shanan – lieutenant general deputy commander of the Palmach
- David Nameri – lieutenant general commander of the Palmach
- Yohanan Ratner – strategy officer
- Moshe Bar-Tikva – training officer
- Yitzhak Rabin – brigade commander; Allon's second in command
- Moshe Kelman – 3rd Battalion commander

Special units commanders

- Shimon Avidan – commander of the "German Department"
- Israel Ben-Yehuda – commander of the "Arab Department"
- Yigal Allon – commander of the "Syrian Department"

Company commanders (as of 1943)

- Yigal Allon, Zalman Mars – Pluga Aleph commanders
- Moshe Dayan, Meir Davidson, Uri Brenner – Pluga Beth commanders
- Uri Yafeh – Pluga Gimel commander
- Benjamin Goldstein Tzur – Pluga Dalet commander
- Abraham Negev – Pluga Hey commander
- Israel Livertovski, Shimon Avidan – Pluga Vav commander
- Maccabi Mutzery-Mani – Plugat Shomrei-Ha'Hof (Coastal Watch) – north
- Jacob Salomon – Plugat Shomrei-Ha'Hof (Coastal Watch) – south
- Yehuda. L. Ben-Tzur – Palyam commander
- Shmuel Tankus
- Shmuel Yanai – Palyam commander
- Rafael Eitan – 4th Battalion, Company A. 1948

Other

- Meir Har-Zion, soldier, described by Chief of Staff Moshe Dayan as "the finest of our commando soldiers, the best soldier ever to emerge in the IDF".
- Bracha Fuld (1926–1946), Palmach squad commander
- Arie Gill-Glick (1930–2016), Israeli Olympic runner
- Amitai Etzioni, author of Diary of a Commando Soldier (1952)
- Amos Horev (born 1924), IDF Major-General, nuclear scientist, and President of Technion – Israel Institute of Technology
- Eliezer Rafaeli (born 1926), founding President of the University of Haifa

== Bibliography ==
- Brener, Uri (1978). The Palmach – Its Warriors and Operation. special edition for Palmach national convention.
- Pa'il, Meir; Zohar, Avraham; Ronen, Azriel. Palmach: Plugot Hamahatz shel Hahaganah, 1941–1949 (in Hebrew).
- Zohar, Avraham; Pail, Meir (2001). The Naval Palmach (PalYam) (in Hebrew). Israel: the Ministry of Defence, Israel and the Galili Center for Defence Studies. ISBN 9650510826.
- Morris, Benny (17 April 2009). 1948: A History of the First Arab-israeli War. Yale University Press. ISBN 978-0300151121.
- Morris, Benny (August 2001). Righteous Victims: A History of the Zionist-Arab Conflict 1881–2001. Vintage. ISBN 0679744754.
- Bel-Eliezer, Uri (1 June 1998). The Making of the Israeli Military. Indiana University Press. ISBN 0253333873.
- Markovitzki, Yaakov (1989). Palmach Special Ground Units (in Hebrew). Israel: Ministry Defence, Israel.
- Goffer, Haim (1995). The Guard on the Shore (in Hebrew). Israel: TAG Publishing House. ISBN 965-487-023-1.
