= Bisan =

Nature spirit or deity venerated in Malaysia

In Malaysian folklore, the Bisan or Bisaan (meaning "woman") is a female nature spirit or deity widely venerated among the Malay and Jakun natives. It is believed that every species of tree has a unique spirit presiding over it, and the Bisan is said to be the specific guardian of the camphor-bearing tree. She can appear in the form of a cicada, and even makes cicada-like sounds at night when she sings—a sure indication that camphor will be found nearby. However, the Bisan is a very jealous spirit, and will drive away anyone looking for camphor unless she is correctly propitiated. Offerings of food may be given to her, and she may also accept the sacrifice of a white cockerel. To prevent the Bisan even further, a person must speak to her only in bahasa kapor or patang kapor ("camphor language", a mixture of Malay and Jakun), an artificial language specifically made to completely confuse the Bisan long enough for the person to look for camphor unhindered.
