= Maoz Haim Synagogue =

Byzantine-period former ancient synagogue in northern Israel

Ma’oz Hayyim Synagogue
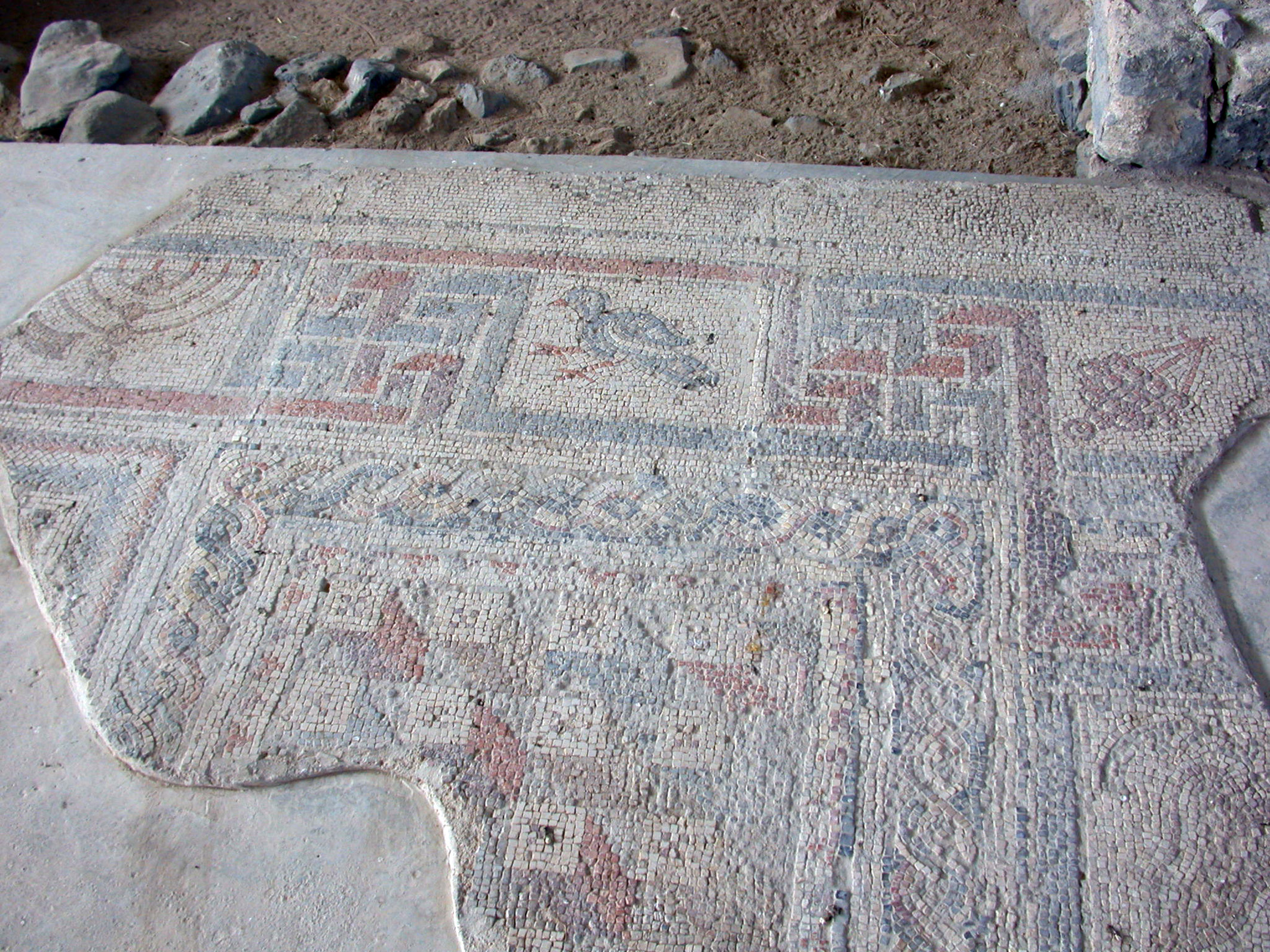
- The mosaic floor of the former ancient synagogue in 2001

- Location of the ancient former synagogue in the Jezreel Valley area

Religion
- Affiliation: Judaism (former)
- Ecclesiastical or organisational status: Synagogue; Archeological site
- Status: Abandoned

Location
- Location: Maoz Haim, Beit She'an, Galilee, Northern Israel
- Country: Israel
- Coordinates: 32°29′38″N 35°32′48.1″E

Architecture
- Type: Basilica
- Style: Byzantine
- Completed: 3rd century

The Maoz Haim Synagogue was a former ancient Jewish synagogue and now archeological site, that is located near Maoz Haim, in the Beit She'an region, in the Jezreel Valley area of the Galilee district of northern Israel. Constructed in the third century as a simple Byzantine-era type basilica building, later apsidical, the ruins of which were discovered in February 1974 by Avshalom Ya’aqobi during some unrelated digging near Maoz Haim. The excavations at the site were conducted from February to March 1974 under the direction of the archaeologist Vassilios Tzaferis.

The runis stands out as an unusual archeological find that contains a record of synagogue development from a time of otherwise sparse historiography. It was even developing right through times of anti-Judaic legislation and sermonizing. The former synagogue was located amongst a large settlement in which it served as a center of worship for Jews there from its beginning up through its final destruction by fire sometime in the early 7th century.

== Layout ==
The initial layout began as a 14 by 12.5 m^{2} (151 by 135 sq ft) with two rows of five columns with benches lining the walls, although none remained standing. There was a single entrance eastward which is considered to be unusual. Most synagogues, aside from others which were located in the same northern Galil region, did not share this feature. However, it is mentioned in rabbinic sources as part of the synagogue layout in order to emulate the eastward entrance utilized by the Tabernacle. The focal point of the synagogue was located southward, towards Jerusalem. Such an orientation had not previously been a feature of synagogues of the era, but was a new custom which was just beginning to take hold. This is especially noticeable with remodeling which was done in the 4th century, altering the synagogue to feature an apse in the southern wall. While the synagogue did not originally have a narthex, one was added during the later phases of building to the north, although it was totally destroyed. The later phases also added an additional entrance to the north, presumably to allow for easier access to the sanctuary.

== Apse ==
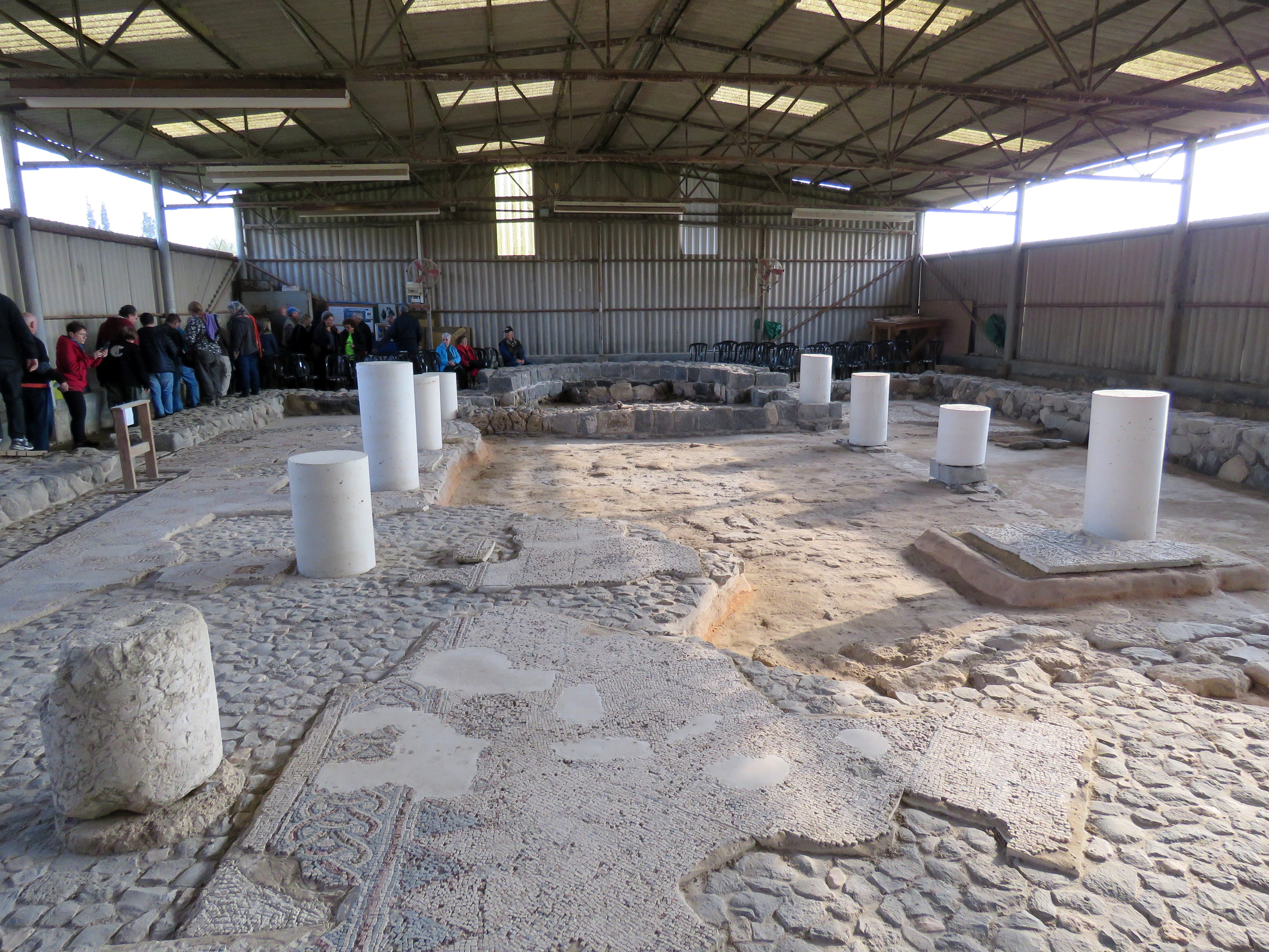

The apse, where the Torah Shrine had previously stood in the first phase of the synagogue, was further modified in the 6th century to include a raised platform enclosed by a chancel screen which may have been used to emphasize the sanctity of the Torah shrine area as compared to the rest of the synagogue or the congregation. Such separations were very common in ancient synagogues and the raised bima area is what shows that this was no exception. The area of the screen depicted a menorah as well as Hebrew letters. The only Hebrew word in the entire building was Shalom; the remainder of the inscriptions were in Greek.

Behind the bima there was an area, possibly a geniza, in which several coins, pottery, and glass were found, which were amongst the few artifacts that were found at all at the site. The coins themselves were from the Byzantine era and helped identify the stages of building and development. More coins, fifty in all, were found outside the southern wall which were most likely hidden there amongst broken roof tiles in order to serve as a possible emergency funds, although the original owner never had the chance to claim them.

== Mosaic floor ==
There were many interesting mosaics which were found at the dig site. The only figures found were birds, but there were also many Jewish symbols portrayed in mosaic form, including a menorah, an etrog, a shofar and grapes. However, the symbols and birds were covered up in the 7th century, transforming the synagogue into one which was aniconic, likely as an act of piety.

In relation to this, the majority of the remaining floor was primarily composed of geometric patterns. Geometric patterns were popular before as in the earliest layer to an extent, but likely were especially valued in an aniconic society. However, it was not well preserved in the upper layers due to the aforementioned destruction of uncertain cause and additional construction that occurred by the local populace afterwards. Despite this, the mosaic floor from the initial stage of construction was better preserved as it had been filled in with approximately 30 cm (12 in) of dirt to lay the new aniconic floor, although not many artifacts were found within it.

== See also ==
- Ancient synagogues in the Palestine region - refers to the entire Palestine region/Land of Israel
- Ancient synagogues in Israel - refers to the modern State of Israel
- Archaeology of Israel
- Oldest synagogues in the world
