= Giora Shanan =

Israeli general

Giora Shanan (Hebrew: גיורא שאנן; 5 May 1908 – 9 November 2001), Palmach member from 1941. Served in the Palmach Headquarters as Deputy Palmach Commander.
