= Maoz Haim =

Maoz Haim: מעוז חיים (Hebrew)
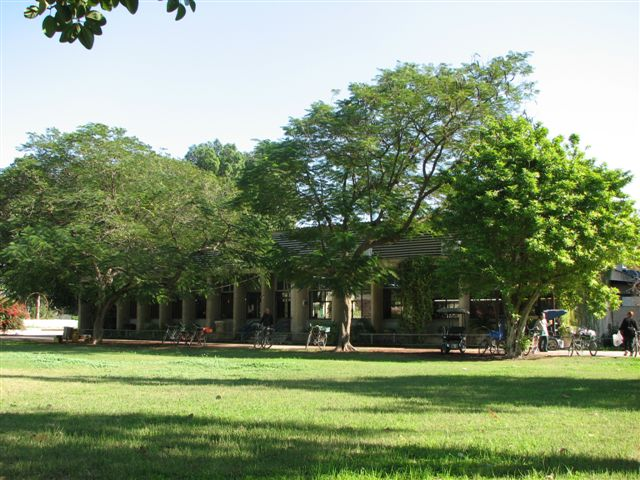
- Etymology: Haim's Fortress
- Location within Jezreel Valley region of Israel Location within Israel
- Coordinates: 32°29′35″N 35°33′2″E
- Country: Israel
- District: Northern
- Subdistrict: Jezreel
- Council: Emek HaMaayanot Regional Council
- Affiliation: Kibbutz Movement
- Founded: 1937
- Founder: German and Polish Jewish refugees
- Population (2024): 524
- Website: www.maoz.org.il

Maoz Haim (Hebrew: מעוז חיים, lit. 'Haim's Fortress') is a kibbutz in Israel. It is located adjacent to the Jordan River in the Beit She'an valley and falls under the jurisdiction of Emek HaMaayanot Regional Council. In 2024 it had a population of 524. Aside from agriculture, the kibbutz also has a plastics factory, "Poliraz".

== History ==
The kibbutz was established in 1937 by immigrants from Poland and Germany within the context of Tower and Stockade initiative. The kibbutz was named after Haim Shturman, a member of the Hagana, who was killed there in 1938.

Maoz Haim was established on land located near the former Palestinian village of Al-Ghazzawiyya.

== Landmarks ==
=== Zakum nature reserve ===
South of the kibbutz is a small (11 dunam) nature reserve of Balanites aegyptiaca trees, called the Hurshat Zakum (Maoz Haim) reserve, declared in 1968. Zakum is the Hebrew name of the tree. This is probably the northernmost occurrence of these trees in the world.

=== Maoz Haim Synagogue ===
A 3rd-century synagogue was discovered in February 1974 during construction work near Maoz Haim. It is an unusual archaeological find in that it attests to a record of synagogue development from a time of otherwise sparse historiography, in times of anti-Judaic legislation. It is situated in a large settlement where it served as a center of worship for Jews until destruction by fire sometime in the early 7th century.

== Notable people ==
- Rachel Liel, (born 1950), activist
- Asaf Lifshitz (1942–2025), sculptor.
- Dvora Omer (1932–2013), author.
- Ilan Shiloah (born 1957), businessman.
- Roni Daniel (1947–2021), journalist.

== Gallery ==
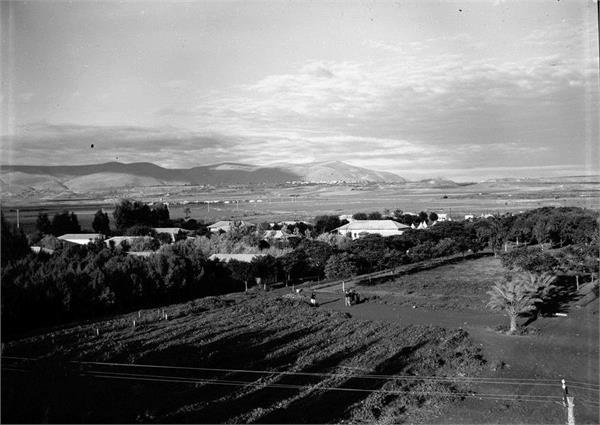
Maoz Haim general appearance

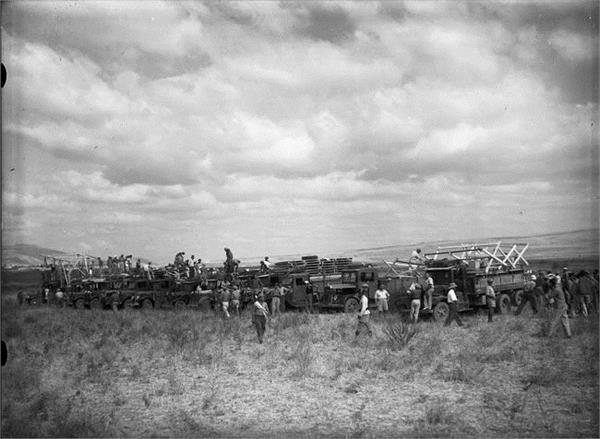
Maoz Haim July 1937 arrival

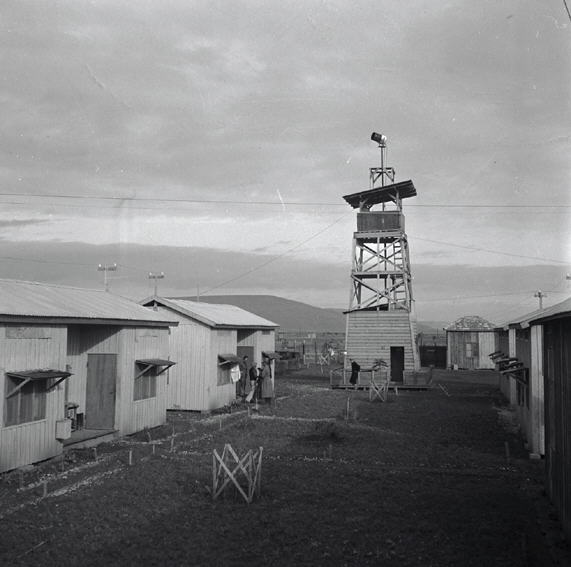
Maoz Haim, 1938

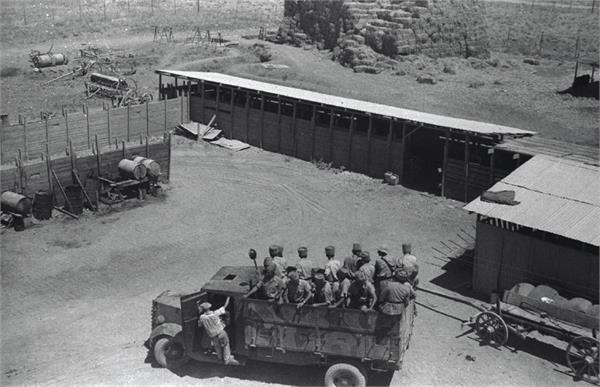
Maoz Haim Settlement Police patrol, 1938

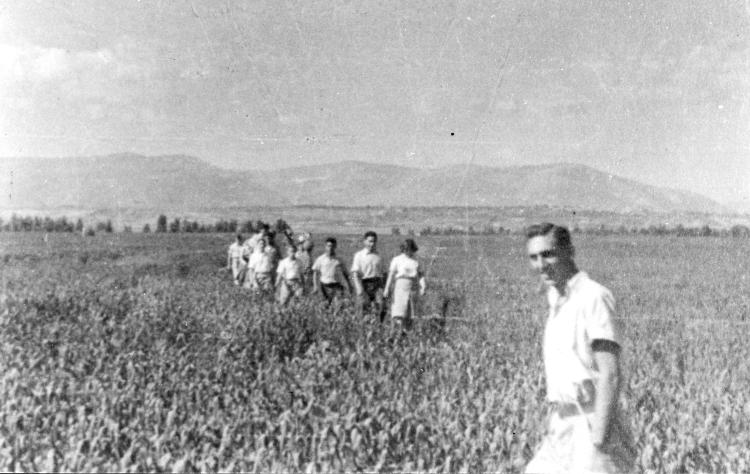
Members of kibbutz Maoz on a training field trip. 1947

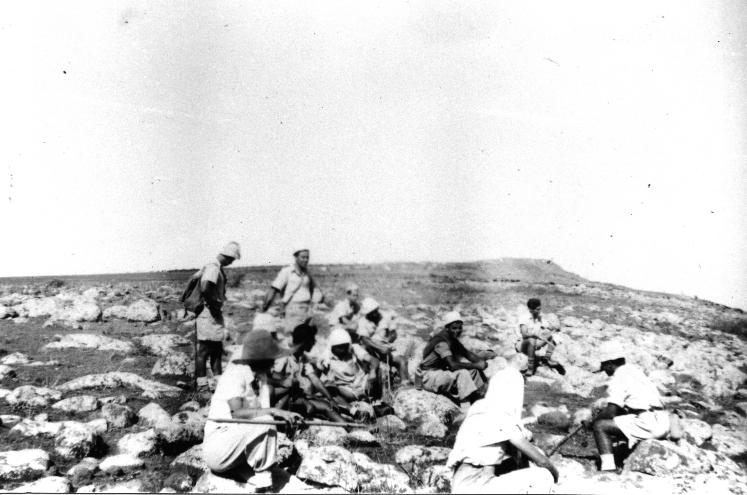
Group from kibbutz Maoz Haim on a trek to Kaokab, 29 November 1947

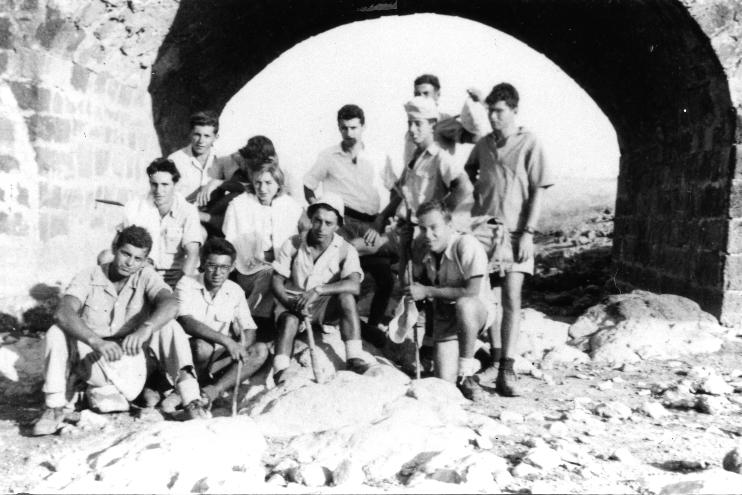
Trek to Kaokab

== See also ==
- Ancient synagogues in the Palestine region - covers entire Palestine region/Land of Israel
  - Ancient synagogues in Israel - covers the modern State of Israel
