= Al-Hamma incident =

Al-Hamma Incident
Date	4 April 1951
Location	Al-Hamma, former Mandatory Palestine
Result	Syrian victory

Belligerents
Israel	Syria

Casualties and losses
7 soldiers killed	None

The al-Hamma Incident (Hebrew: תקרית אל-חמה) refers to an event on 4 April 1951 that resulted in the death of seven IDF soldiers at the hands of Syrian military forces. The action occurred during an Israeli attempt to enforce its claimed sovereignty over the demilitarized zone along the Syrian border.

== Background ==
Al-Hamma was in the territory of the British Mandate of Palestine, and allocated to the Jewish state under the 1947 UN partition plan. During the 1948 Arab–Israeli War, the main thrust of the Syrian invasion of the Galilee crossed the border at Al-Hamma. According to the 1949 armistice agreement between Israel and Syria, it was determined that a string of villages, including Al-Hamma, Nuqeib, Al-Samra in the Tiberias Subdistrict, and Kirad al-Baqqara and Kirad al-Ghannama further north in the Safad Subdistrict, would be included the demilitarized zone (DMZ) between Israel and Syria. The inhabitants and their property were formally protected by Article V of the Israeli-Syrian agreement of 20 July that year. However, according to Benny Morris, Israel wanted the 2,200 Arab inhabitants of those villages to move to Syria. The Israeli military thought that the inhabitants of the DMZ remained loyal to Syria and they suspected them of helping Syrian intelligence. Local Jewish settlers and law enforcement suspected the villagers of petty crimes. Morris also noted that Israeli settlers and settlement agencies coveted the land of the local Arabs.

== The incident ==
Until 1951, Israel had never patrolled or occupied Al-Hamma. However, in the spring of that year, Israel decided to assert its claimed sovereignty over the village. On 4 April that year, IDF General Staff (ignoring the protest from the Northern Command) sent two patrol-vehicles to the village. The patrol was disguised as policemen, as military forces were prohibited in the DMZ. Seven Israeli soldiers were killed by the Syrians.

According to the Syrian complaint to the Israel–Syria Mixed Armistice Commission, Israel sent a detachment of police to Al-Hamma as part of a preconceived plan to occupy the entire DMZ. After the Israelis opened fire on the local police post and Syrian police outpost, both were obliged to return fire. The Israeli version was that Syrian troops had entered Al-Hamma and disarmed the local police before firing on the Israeli police.

== Reactions ==
The following day, four Israel planes bombed the police station at Al-Hamma and a Syrian positions at Al Hadid. Two women were killed, and six people reported injured. In addition, Israel decided to demolish the remaining houses in the Arab villages of Kirad al-Ghannama, Kirad al-Baqqara, Al-Samra and Nuqeib (in that order) to render the DMZ "clear of Arabs". Syria continued to control Al-Hamma until the 1967 Six-Day War. The enclave of Hamat Gader became a continuing source of friction between Israel and Syria.

== Bibliography ==
- Morris, Benny (1993). Israel's Border Wars 1949–1956: Arab Infiltration, Israeli Retaliation, and the Countdown to the Suez War, Oxford, Clarendon Press, ISBN 0-19-827850-0
- Morris, Benny (2004). The Birth of the Palestinian Refugee Problem Revisited. Cambridge University Press. ISBN 978-0-521-00967-6.
- Morris, Benny (2008). 1948: The First Arab-Israeli War. Yale University Press. ISBN 978-0-300-12696-9.
