= Hamat Gader =

Site of hot springs near the Yarmuk River

Hammat Gader
- חמת גדר (Hebrew)
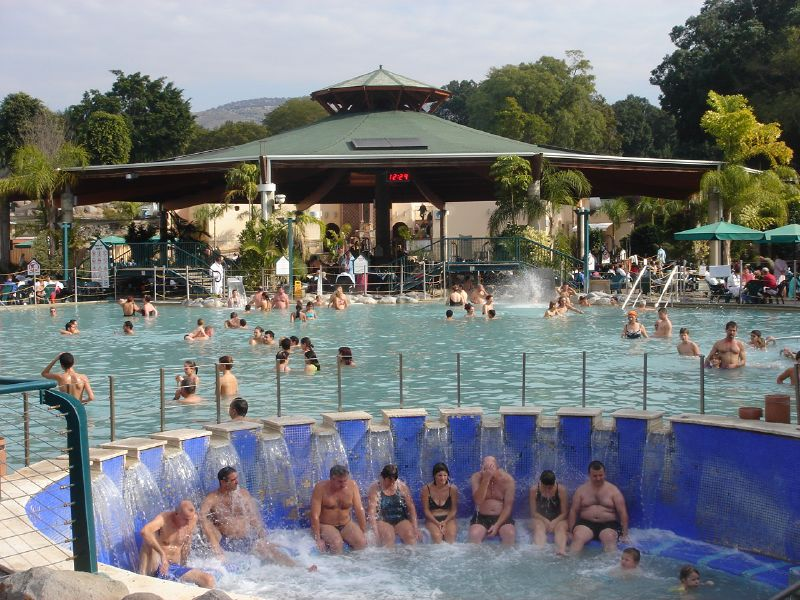
- Modern hot springs-fed pools

- Location within Israel
- 32°41′03″N 35°39′55″E
- Location: Israel
- Region: Northern District

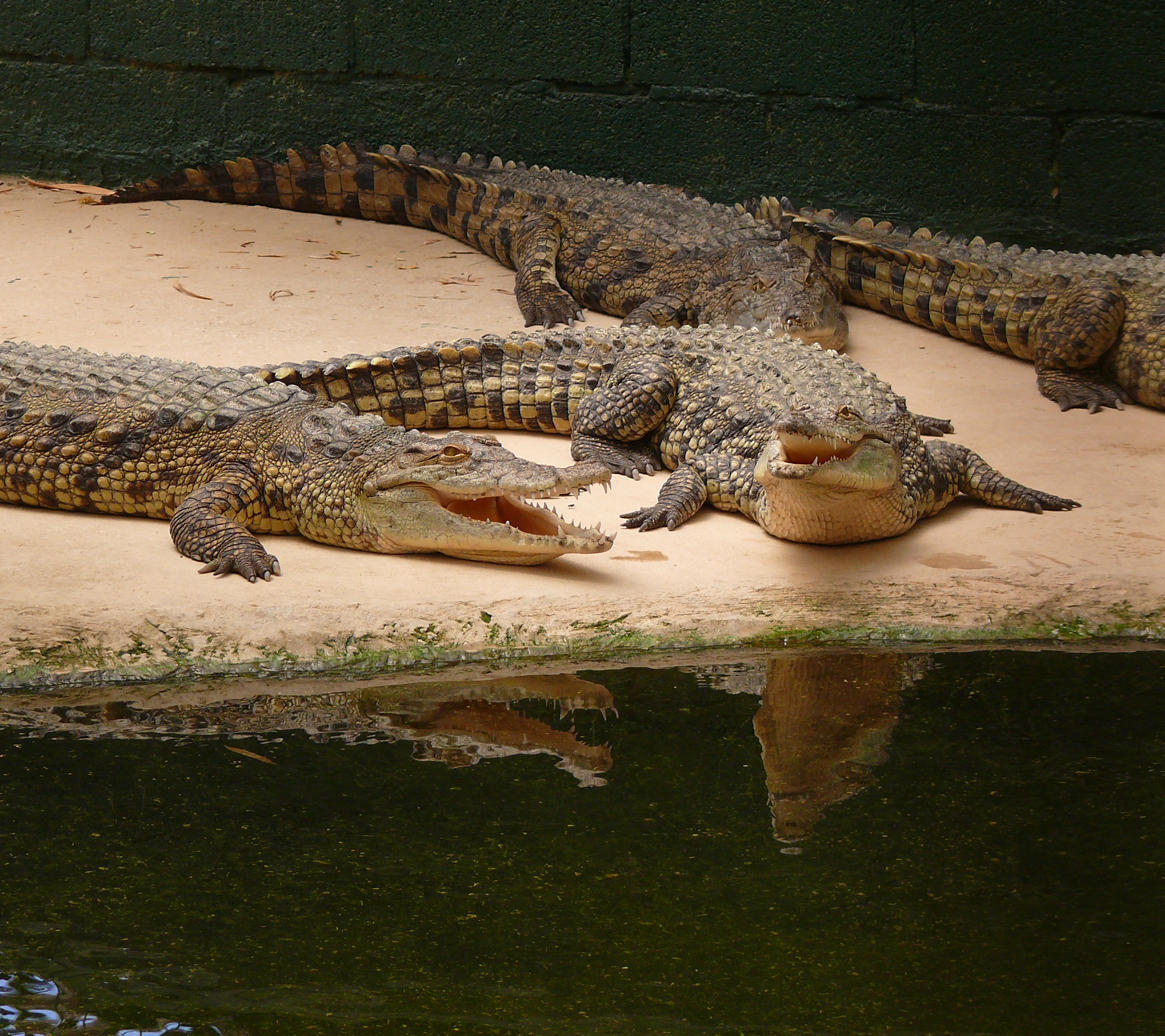
Young Nile Crocodiles at Hamat Gader's Crocodilians Farm

Hamat Gader (Hebrew: חַמַּת גָּדֵר; Imperial Aramaic: חמתא דגדר, hammata degader; Ancient Greek: Ἑμμαθά, Emmatha or ῎Αμαθα, Amatha; Arabic: الحمة السورية al-Hamma) is a hot springs site in the Yarmuk River valley, located in an area under Israeli control, near the Golan Heights and the border with Jordan. It contains a spa, modern and ancient baths, a crocodilians farm and a zoo.

Hamat Gader, known for its health benefits and recreation since classical antiquity, was mentioned in several historical texts. Built by the Romans in the 2nd century, the site featured a bath complex and a theater. An ancient synagogue, complete with mosaics and inscriptions, also stood within its walls. Despite earthquakes damaging the site in the 7th and 8th centuries, it continued to attract visitors until abandonment in the 9th century, eventually becoming buried beneath silt.

It is set on several mineral springs, the hottest of which reaches temperatures of up to 52 °C.

== Geography and geology ==
Hamat Gader lies in the valley of the Yarmuk River, near the southern edge of the Golan Heights and close to the border with Jordan, about 10 kilometres (6.2 mi) from the tripoint shared by Israel, Jordan, and Syria.

The site's geothermal activity is linked to its position along the Dead Sea Transform, the fault system that forms part of the boundary between the African and Arabian tectonic plates. Movement along this fault has shaped the Jordan Rift Valley and periodically generated earthquakes in the region, including one that damaged the bath complex in the 7th century CE.

Five springs rise at the site: four are hot, mineral-rich, and sulfurous, and one yields fresh, cool water. The hottest, Ein al-Maqla, historically the main source for the Roman-era baths, reaches temperatures of up to 52 °C (126 °F). The spring that supplies the modern bathing pools, Ein Balsam, flows at a comparatively cooler 40–42 °C (104–108 °F) and a rate of 500–700 cubic metres per hour.

A geochemical study of the springs found their waters to be mixtures of two distinct water sources, both ultimately derived from rainfall that infiltrated the ground and was subsequently heated at depth before resurfacing.

== Etymology ==
The ancient Hebrew name, Hammat Gader or Hammath Gader, means hot springs of Gader, also translated as Hammath-by-Gadara. The ruins of the ancient city of Gadara stand south of Hammat Gader, on the plateau edge above the springs, in modern Umm Qais.

The Arabic name Al-Hammeh or El-Hamma dates back to the medieval period and also relates to "hot springs". The ancient synagogue was uncovered on the mound known as Tell Bani, whose name is a corruption of the Greek word balaneion (βαλανειον), meaning "bath".

== History ==
=== Roman, Byzantine and Umayyad periods ===
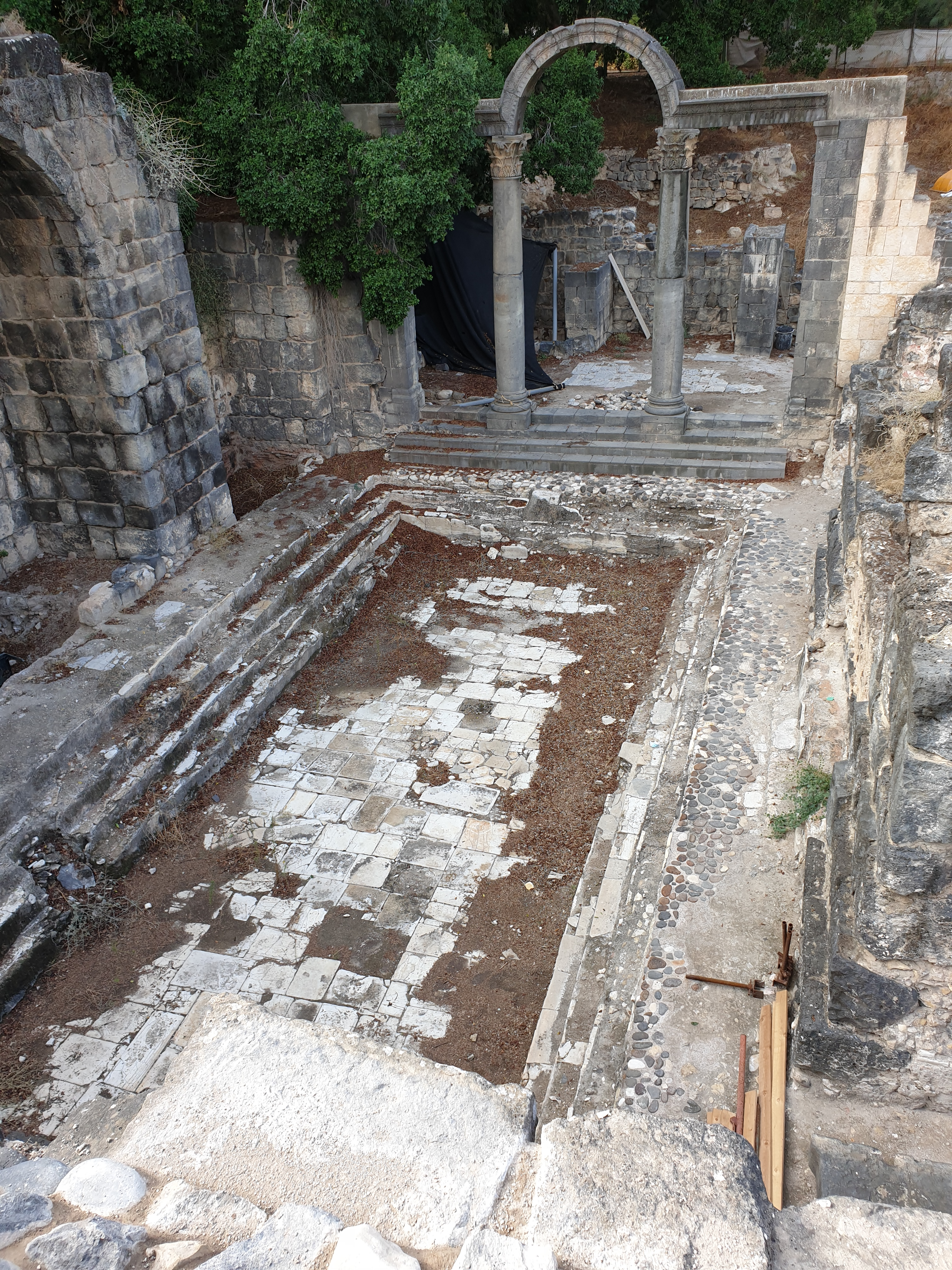
Ancient Roman bath with arches

Hamat Gader was already a widely known health and recreation site in Roman times. It is mentioned in Strabo, Origen and Eunapius, as well as in Talmudic sources, which record visits by sages from Rabbi Meir (mid-second century CE) who discussed the Sabbath-boundary status of Hammat Gader relative to nearby Gadara.

Construction of the bath complex began in the 2nd century by the 10th Roman Legion, which was garrisoned in the city of Gadara. Two distinct construction periods are evident at the site: The Roman-Byzantine Period, during which most of the bath complex was built, and the Muslim period, during which major changes were made to the existing structures.

The site includes a Roman theatre, which was built in the 3rd century CE and contained 2,000 seats.

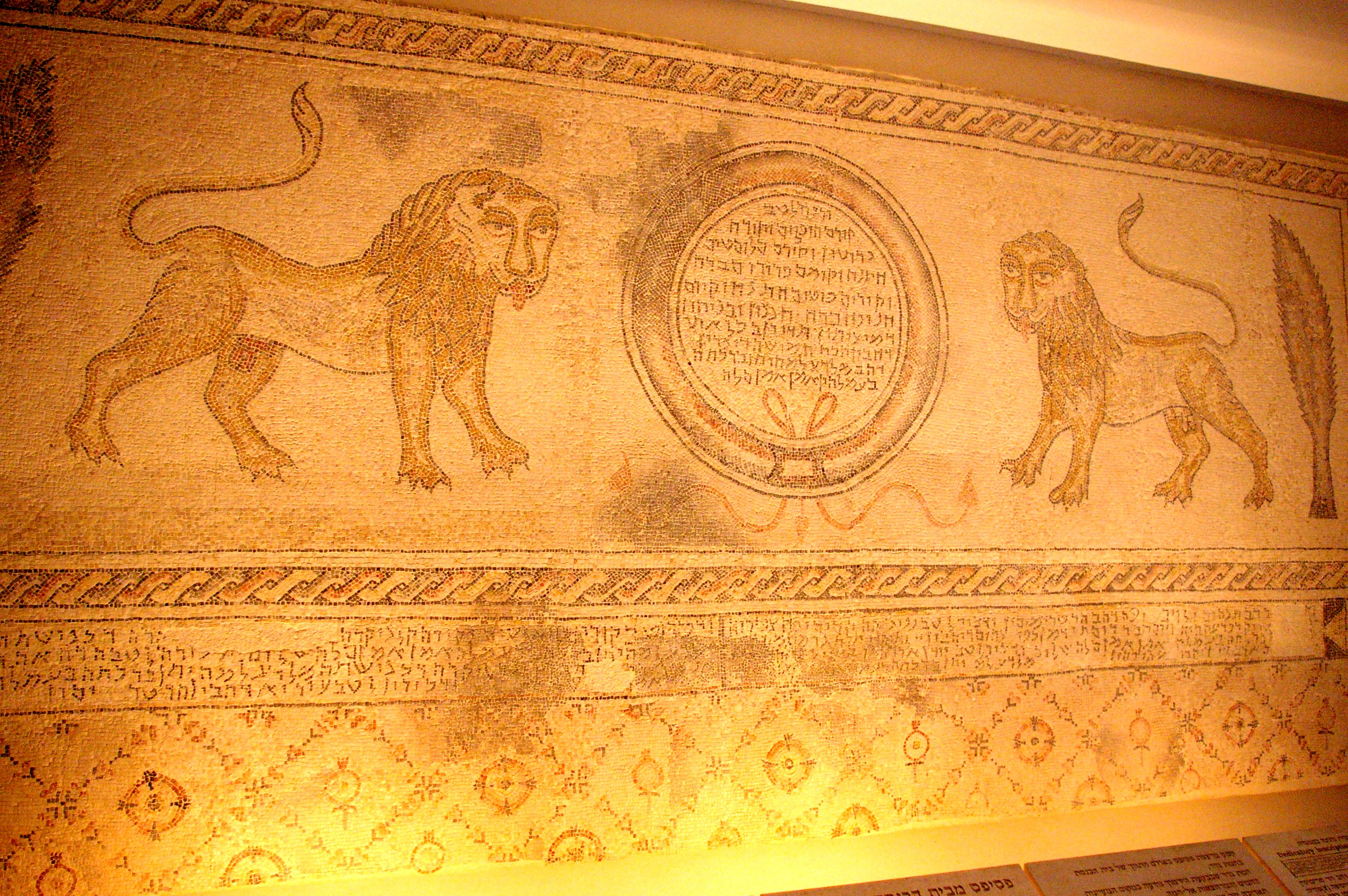
A section of the mosaic pavement recovered from the ancient Hamat Gader synagogue, now installed in the entrance hall of the Supreme Court of Israel.

A large synagogue was built in the 5th century CE. The synagogue complex is enclosed by a 32.5-meter-long wall and oriented southwards towards Jerusalem. The main prayer hall, nearly square at 13 meters per side, boasted two rows of columns, an apse, and a bema set into the southern wall. Adorned with a mosaic floor, the hall retained four well-preserved Aramaic inscriptions, while damaged sections bore inscriptions detailing donations from various locales. Sukenik's 1932 excavation uncovered the main structure along with the Aramaic mosaic inscriptions and a Greek inscription from the chancel screen. Subsequent analysis by G. Foerster in 1982 shed light on earlier phases of construction.

The empress Aelia Eudocia composed a poem praising the qualities of the multiple springs which was inscribed so that visitors could see it as they went into the pool.

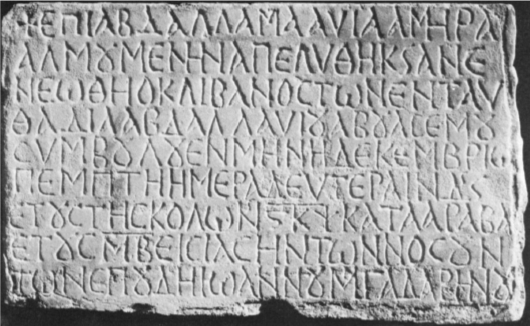
A Greek inscription crediting the Umayyad caliph Mu'awiya for restoring the Roman bathhouses in 663

Some of the buildings including the famous thermae were damaged by an earthquake and restored in 663 by the first Umayyad caliph Mu'awiyah who ruled from Damascus. A century later the 749 Galilee earthquake hit. Eventually, in the 9th century, the baths were abandoned and a thick layer of silt covered the ruins.

=== Ottoman period and British Mandate ===
In the early 20th century, a railway station was established at Hamat Gader as part of the Ottoman built Jezreel Valley railway, a branch of the Hejaz railway linking Haifa to Daraa in southern Syria. The al-Hamma station, geographically isolated from the rest of the line, was the last stop within the later boundaries of Mandatory Palestine.

At the time of the 1931 census, the Palestinian Arab village of Al-Hamma, located at the site, had 46 occupied houses and a population of 170 Muslims, 1 Jew, and 1 Christian.

In 1941, as part of a wider British programme of fortified police stations known as Tegart forts, built in response to the 1936–1939 Arab revolt, a police post was established on a bluff above al-Hamma to guard the resort hotels, the railway station, and the nearby rail bridges over the Yarmuk. It was staffed by a small British police garrison until the end of the Mandate. (Note: The station was one of dozens built following the 1938 recommendations of a committee headed by Charles Tegart.)

Beginning in 1944, a 45-room hotel and pension, "Marpe" (Hebrew: מרפא, lit. 'Healing'), operated at the site under a British Mandate concession held by the wealthy local landowner Suleiman Nadif, with financing from Haifa businessman Zeev Sapir. Sapir was forced to abandon the site for security reasons in the autumn of 1947, but the Nadif family continued to operate the hotel alone until the Six-Day War of 1967.

On the night of 16–17 June 1946, Palmach forces destroyed the railway bridge over the Yarmuk near al-Hamma as part of the Night of the Bridges (Operation Markolet), a coordinated Haganah operation against eleven bridges connecting Mandatory Palestine to neighbouring countries.

=== Syrian control ===
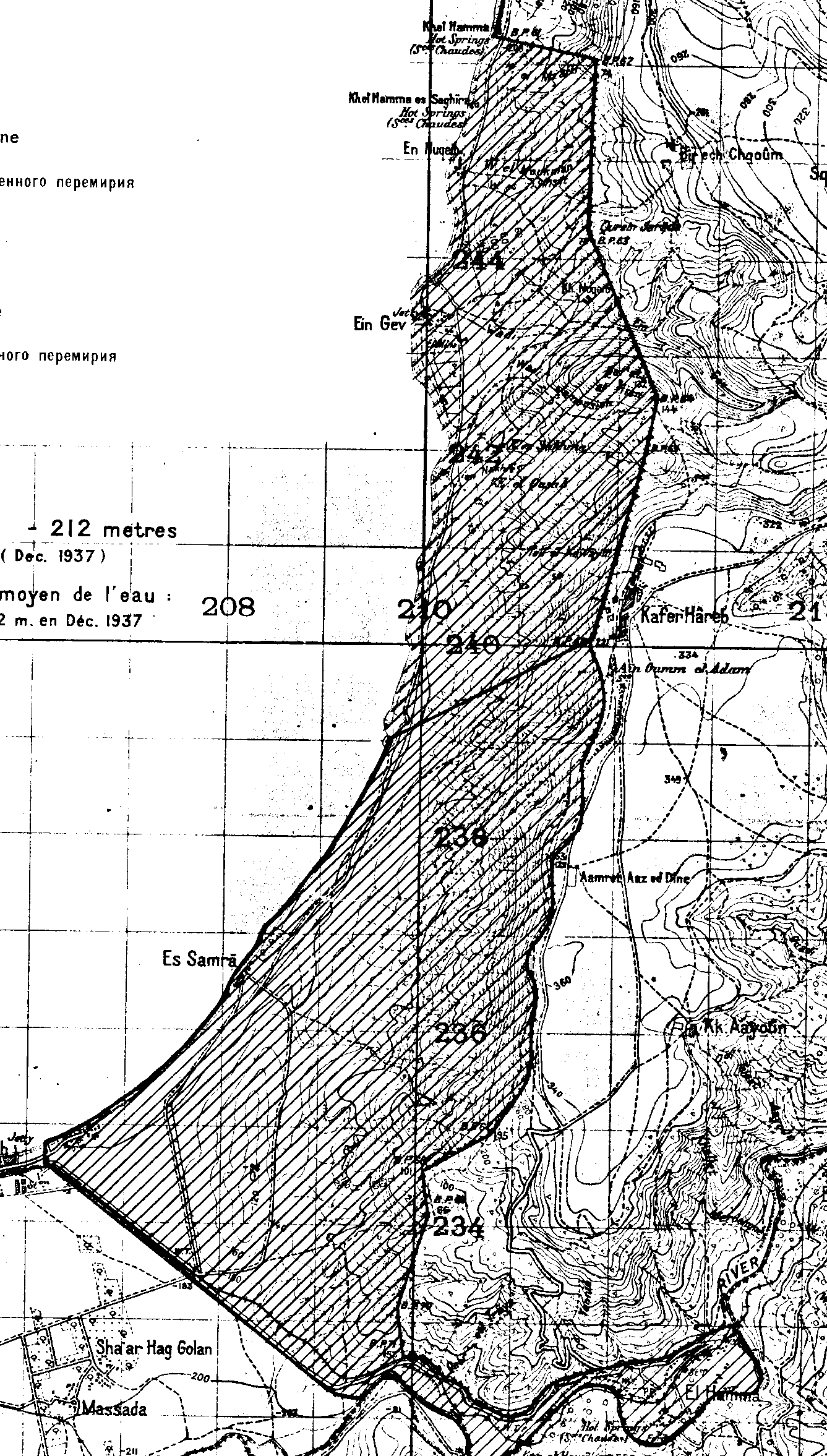
Ein Gev - Al Samra - Al Hamma Demilitarized Zone, per the Israel–Syria Mixed Armistice Commission

After the 1948 Arab–Israeli War, according to the armistice agreements of 1949 Between Israel and Syria, it was determined that the area (which had been allocated to the Jewish state under the 1947 UN partition plan) would be included in the demilitarized zone (DMZ) between Israel and Syria. The villagers and their property were formally protected by Article V of the Israeli-Syrian agreement of 20 July that year. However, Israel thought the Arab villagers could pose a security threat, and Israeli settlers and settlement agencies coveted the land. Israel therefore wanted the Palestinian inhabitants, a total of 2,200 people, moved to Syria.

On April 4, 1951, a two-vehicle military patrol set out for Hamat Gader in order to assert Israeli sovereignty over the site, over the objections from the Northern Command that Syria was likely to attack it. Since military forces were not permitted in the DMZ, members of the patrol were disguised as policemen. As predicted, the Syrians attacked the patrol and seven Israeli soldiers were killed. In retaliation, Israel bombed the Syrian police station at al Hamma and another Syrian position, killing two women, and demolished the empty houses in Kirad al-Ghannama, Kirad al-Baqqara, Al-Samra and Nuqeib in order to render the DMZ "clear of Arabs". The incident also drew diplomatic involvement from the United States, which pressed both Israel and Syria to avoid further escalation. Syria retained control of Al-Hamma itself until the Six-Day War in 1967, and the site remained a recurring point of friction between the two countries in the interim. Several of the soldiers killed in the attack were recent immigrants to Israel. One of them, Shimon Balas, had arrived from Yemen shortly before his death. A memorial to the seven, Yad Lashiva'a ("Memorial to the Seven"), was dedicated at the site on 1 June 2015.

=== Israeli control ===
Israeli control over Hamat Gader was secured during the Six-Day War in 1967, when the Israeli army occupied the surrounding Golan Heights, allowing free access to Hamat Gader for Israelis. Since then, it has been under Israeli control and has been developed as a tourist attraction, health resort and an alligator and exotic bird reserve. The health resort opened in 1977.

The site's first director, responsible for its planning, establishment, and management from 1976 to 1979, was Pamela Tarnter, a member of Kibbutz Mevo Hama who had immigrated from Britain as part of the Hever Hakvutzot movement's nucleus during the Yom Kippur War.

Today, Hamat Gader also includes a crocodilian farm with crocodiles, alligators and even caimans and gavials. It houses approximately 200 crocodilians and is described as one of the largest crocodile farms in the Middle East.

Since 1977, Hamat Gader has been owned and jointly operated by a company held by four kibbutzim of the southern Golan Heights: Mevo Hama, Kfar Haruv, Afik, and Meitzar.

== Tourist site ==
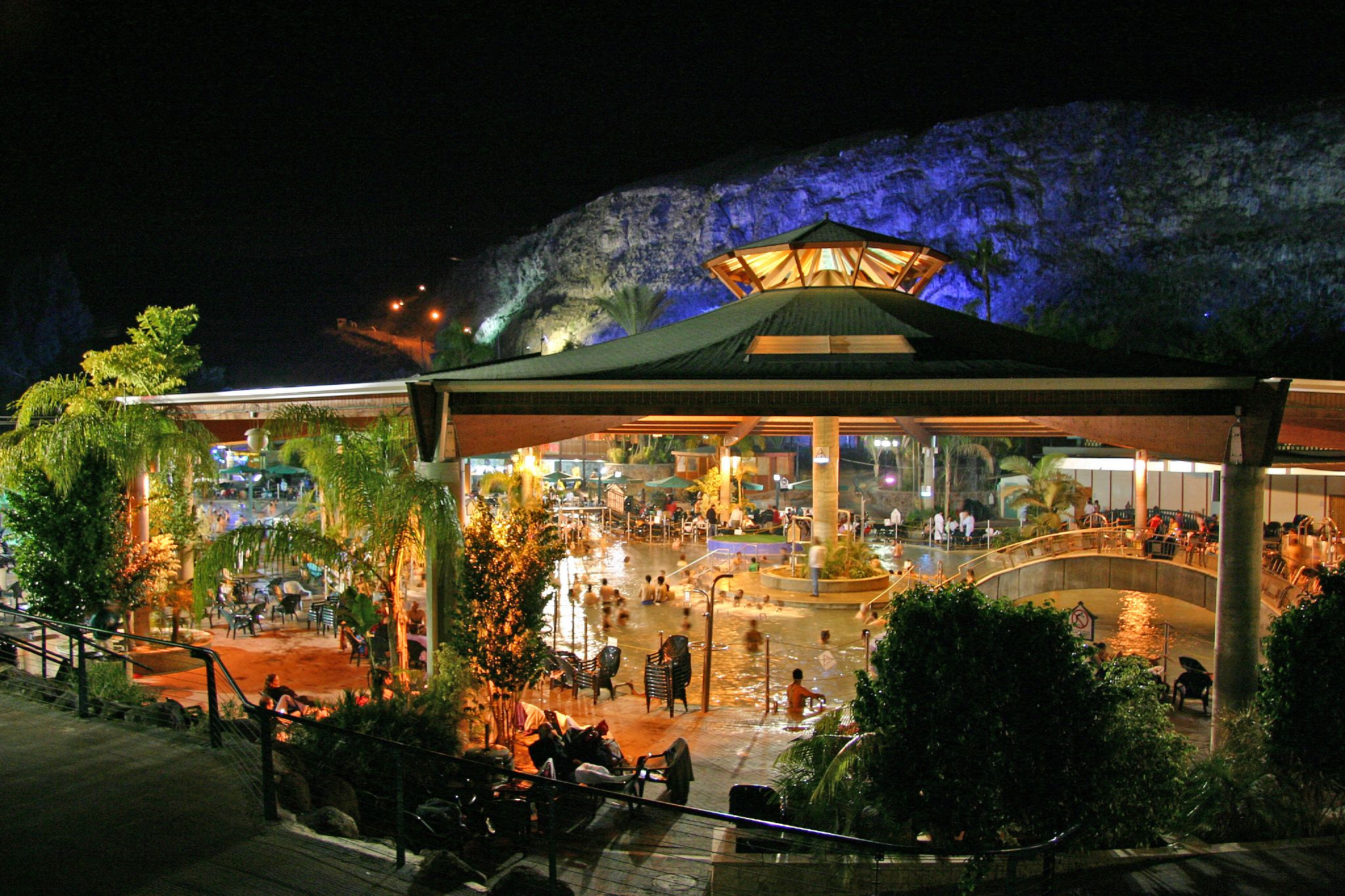
Hamat Gader at night

The Hamat Gader tourist site is centered around thermal baths and a crocodile farm. The water of the thermal baths contains sulfur at a concentration of 4.7%, and is popularly described as having a therapeutic effect on skin conditions, asthma, and joint pain.

The bathing area includes several spring-fed pools of varying temperature, jacuzzis, and a boutique spa hotel. Alongside the crocodile farm, the site's animal park includes a petting zoo, a small wildlife reserve, and a trained-parrot show, while the wider grounds have fishing ponds and, during the warmer months, a water park with slides.

The excavated Roman baths, along with the theatre and synagogue remains, have been closed to the public since the 1980s due to safety and conservation concerns; a restoration plan for the archaeological park has been drafted but not yet implemented.

== See also ==
- Al-Hamma, Tiberias (former Palestinian village)
- Ancient synagogues in the Palestine region - covers entire Palestine region/Land of Israel
- Ancient synagogues in Israel - covers the modern State of Israel
