= HaOn =

Kibbutz in Northern Israel

HaOn: האון (Hebrew)
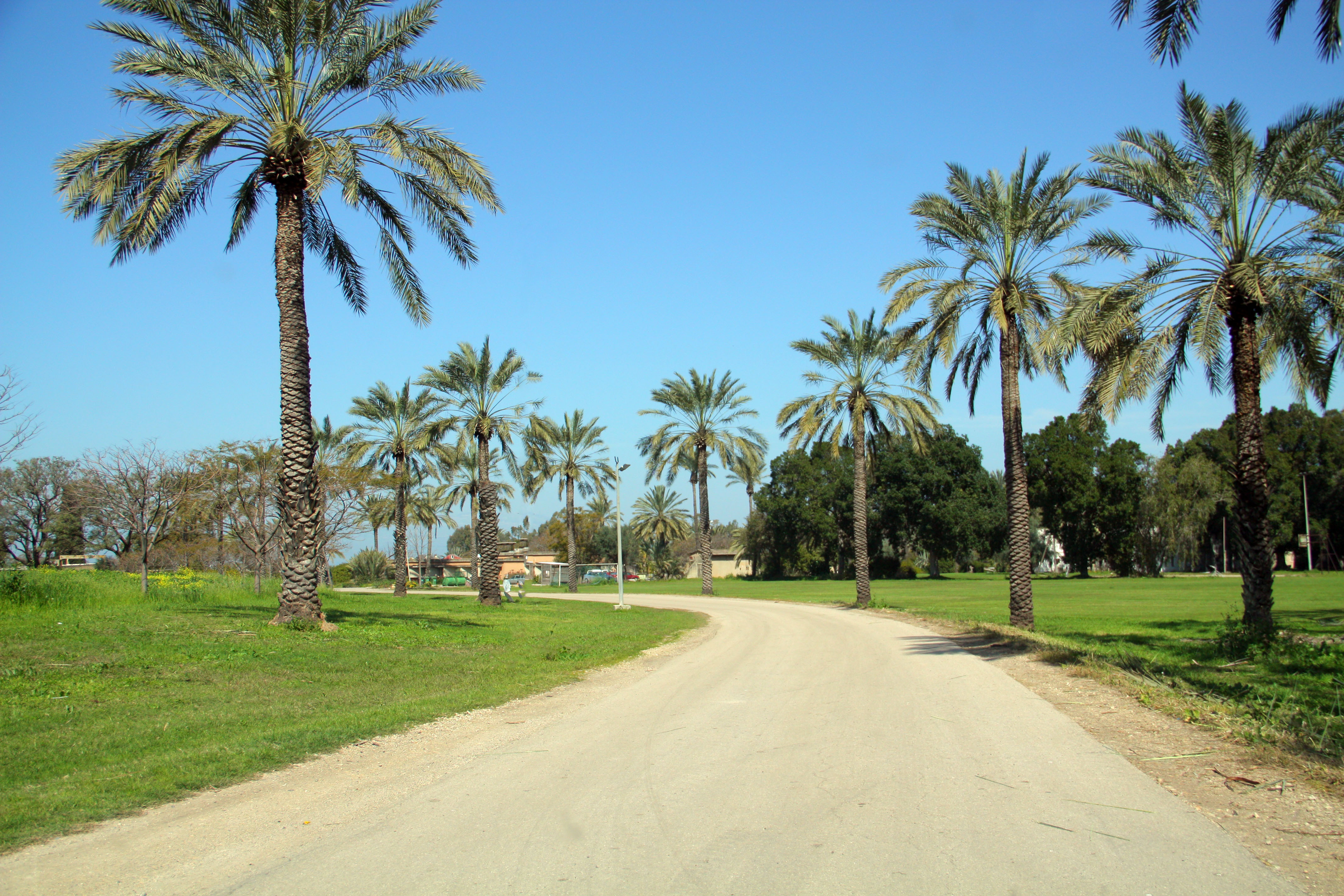
- Etymology: The Power
- Location within Northeast Israel Location within Israel
- Coordinates: 32°43′29″N 35°37′19″E
- Country: Israel
- District: Northern
- Subdistrict: Kinneret
- Council: Emek HaYarden
- Affiliation: Kibbutz Movement
- Founded: 1949
- Founder: Polish Jews and Hungarian Habonim members
- Population (2024): 207

HaOn (Hebrew: האון, lit. 'The Power') is a kibbutz on the shore of the Sea of Galilee in northern Israel. Located at the foot of the Golan Heights about a twenty-minute drive from the city of Tiberias, it is part of Emek HaYarden Regional Council. HaOn formerly operated as a kibbutz belonging to the United Kibbutz Movement. In 2024 it had a population of 207.

== History ==
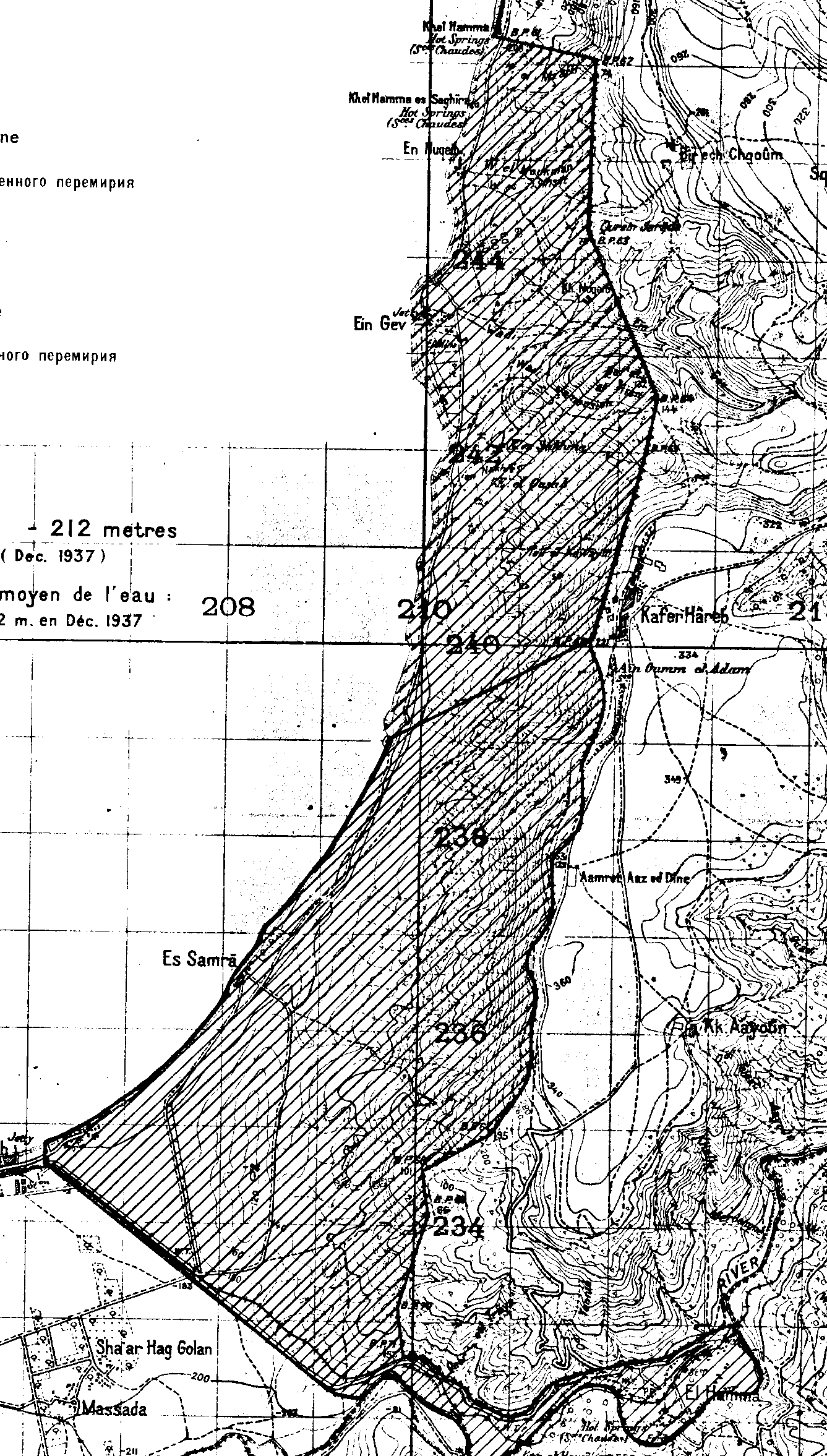
Ein Gev - Al Samra - Al Hamma Demilitarized Zone, per the Israel–Syria Mixed Armistice Commission. HaOn was founded in the DMZ, on the ruins of Al-Samra.

The community was established in August 1949 as a Nahal outpost near Ein Gev and moved to the permanent location on land near the depopulated Palestinian village of As-Samra in October of that year. The founders of the kibbutz were 120 members of two groups: the Nacham group of Polish immigrants who arrived in Eretz Israel in 1947 and underwent training in Kvutzat Kinneret and a group of immigrants from the Habonim movement in Hungary who immigrated through camps in Cyprus and were trained in Kfar Giladi. A Turkish youth group joined the kibbutz three months after their aliya.

Over the years until the 1967 Six-Day War, the kibbutz had many confrontations with Syrians across the border, mainly in the period from 1965 to 1967. Among other things, Syrian shepherds crossed the border and grazed with their flocks in the kibbutz fields, and the kibbutz members were frequently fired upon from the Syrian posts in the Golan Heights, while cultivating their fields. A number of machine operators received the decoration of courage for operating tractors and bulldozers, most of them not armoured, in order to cultivate land and carry out engineering work in the sector of fire, under heavy fire and artillery shelling on the Syrian side.

Due to the fact it was situated in the Israel–Syria demilitarised zone under the 1949 Armistice Agreements, HaOn was claimed by Syria as its territory during negotiations for a peace agreement in the 1990s. The Israeli government rejected the claims, as it would have led to Syria having territory west of the 1923 border between Mandatory Palestine and the French Mandate of Syria.

Until July 2007 HaOn operated as a kibbutz, but debts of 50 million NIS meant that it had to sell its businesses and return land to state ownership.

== Turkish pilots memorial ==
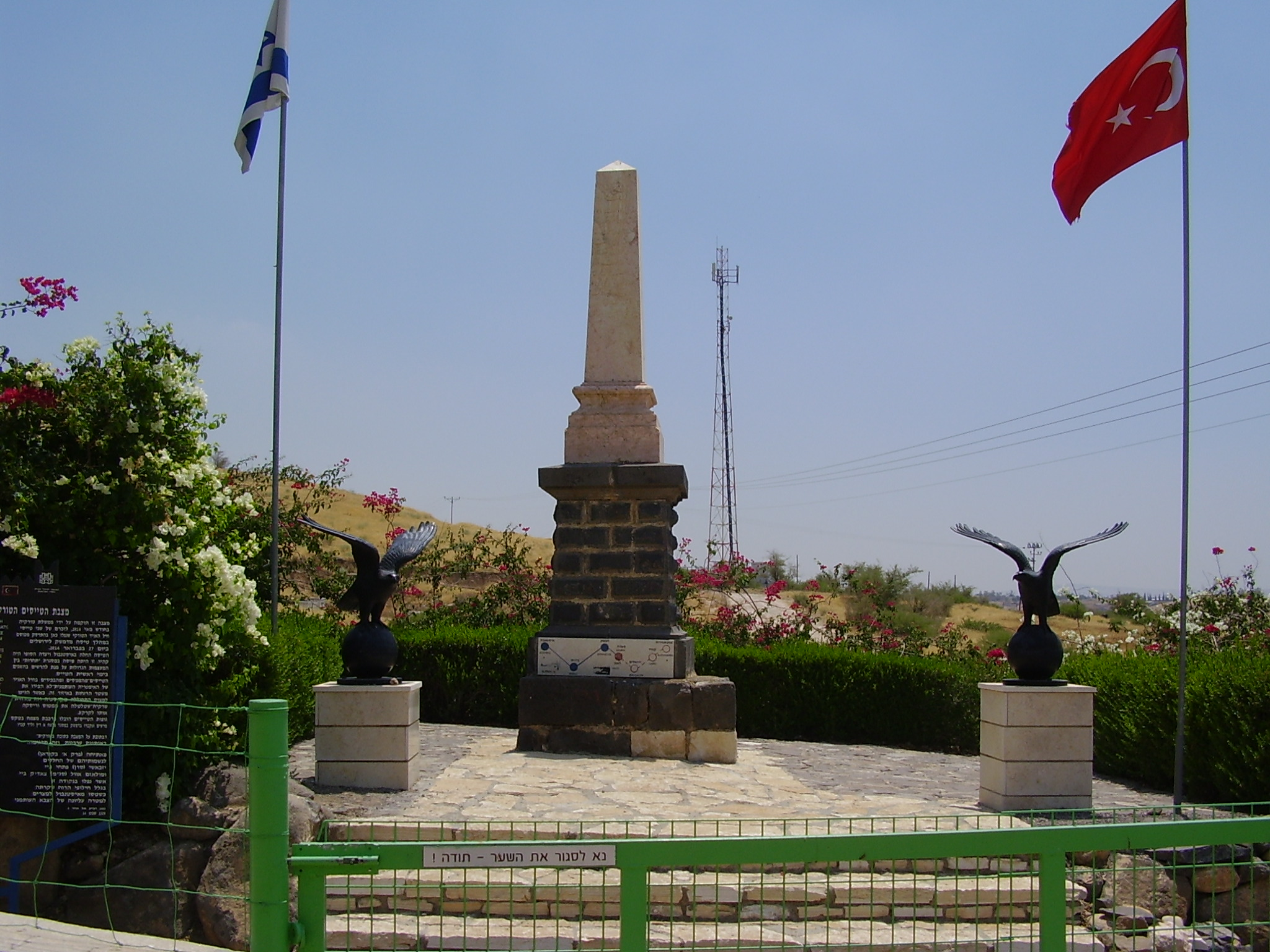
1914 Ottoman memorial for the two killed pilots

In the village fields stands a memorial to two Turkish pilots who crashed at the location on 8 February 1914. Two planes of the fledgling Ottoman Air Force took off from Istanbul on a flight to Jerusalem to deliver the first Ottoman air mail, but never reached their destination. The memorial was rediscovered, restored and tended to by Yerach Paran, a member of HaOn who investigated the story, planted trees at the site and hosted the commander of the Turkish Air Force. Paran (1938–2020) was a military historian and founder of EITAN, the army's "Unit for Detecting Missing Soldiers".

== Economy ==
HaOn runs a spa facing the Sea of Galilee.

In Kibbutz Haon there was a large ostrich farm in Israel with more than 5000 ostriches, for commercial and tourist purposes. The farm still exists, but only for tourist purposes. The kibbutz also had banana fields, a date grove and fish farm, all of which were harvested and for commercial sale. On the south side of the kibbutz was a modest vacation resort with a small club and beach access to the lake.

In the years 1995, 1998 and 1999, the Jacob's Ladder (music festival) took place In Kibbutz Haon.

== See also ==
- Aviation Martyrs' Monument, the memorial dedicated to the fallen officers of the same 1914 expedition, but this time in Istanbul
