= Al-Hamma, Tiberias =

Al-Hamma الحمّة El Hamma, El Hammé
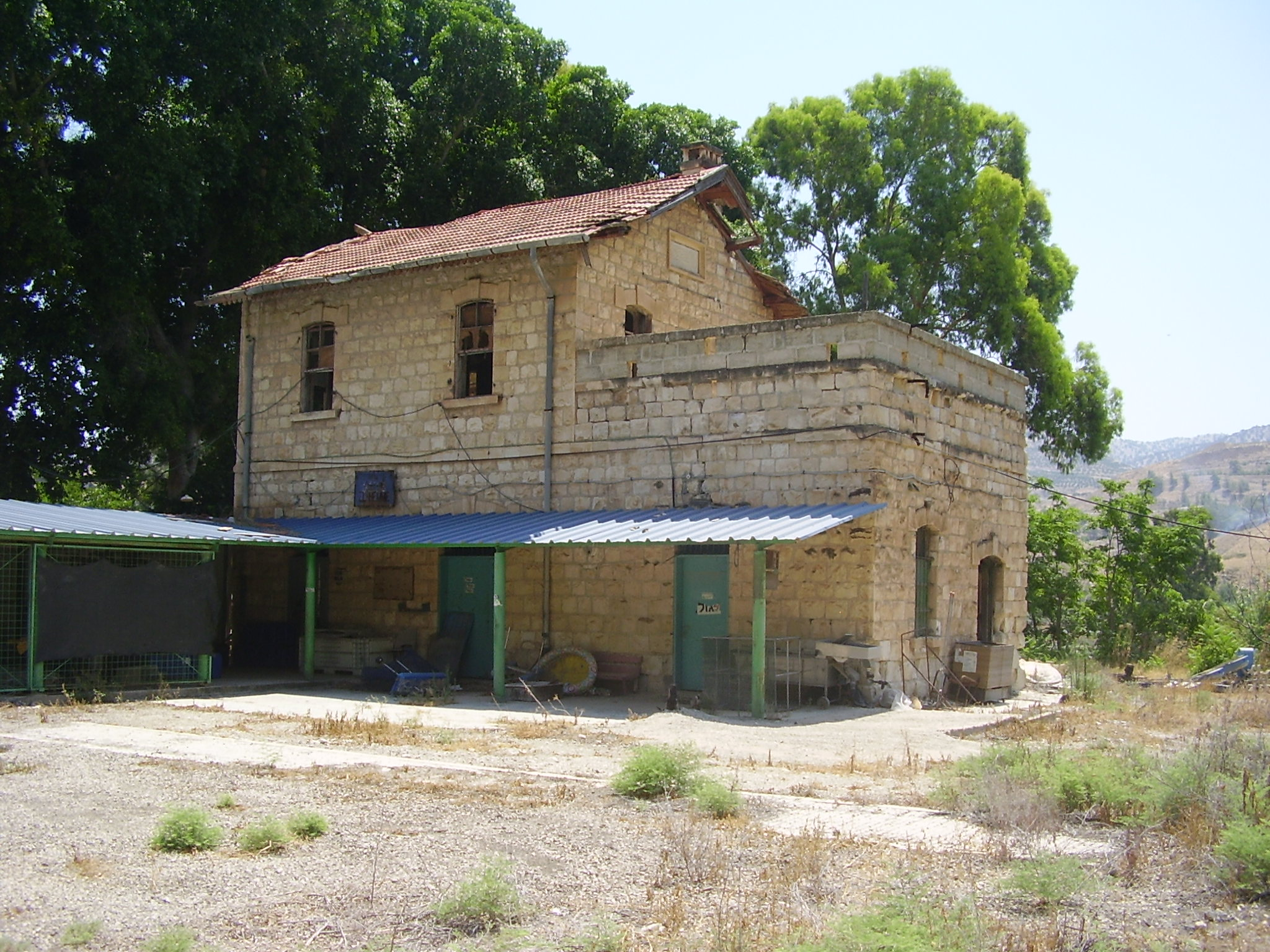
- Former railway station of Al-Hamma, with a sign in Arabic reading "al-Hama".

- Location within Mandatory Palestine
- Coordinates: 32°41′10″N 35°39′51″E
- Palestine grid: 212/232
- Geopolitical entity: Mandatory Palestine
- Subdistrict: Tiberias
- Date of depopulation: July 1949

Area
  - Total: 1,692 dunams (1.692 km^{2}; 0.653 sq mi)

Population (1945)
  - Total: 290
- Current Localities: Hamat Gader

Al-Hamma (Arabic: الحمّة) was a Palestinian Arab village in the Tiberias Subdistrict, 12 kilometres (7.5 mi) southeast of Tiberias. It was situated on a narrow salient in the Yarmouk Valley bounded by Syria to the north and Transjordan to the south and east. Al-Hamma was one of the stations on the Jezreel Valley railway, linking the Hejaz Railway to Haifa. It was depopulated twice, once in July 1949, and again between 1949 and 1956.

== Etymology ==
The name indicates the presence of hot water springs, as hammah is Arabic for "hot spring".

== History ==
=== Emmatha, Roman and Byzantine periods ===
During the Roman Empire it was known as Emmatha. During this period, Al-Hamma belonged to the district of Gadara.

=== Early Muslim period ===
Recent excavations have revealed a large Umayyad public building comprising several rooms with mosaic floors, set with red, black and white tesserae. The building seems to have been destroyed by the 749 Golan earthquake, but was rebuilt and used until finally abandoned after the earthquake of 1033.

=== Ottoman period ===
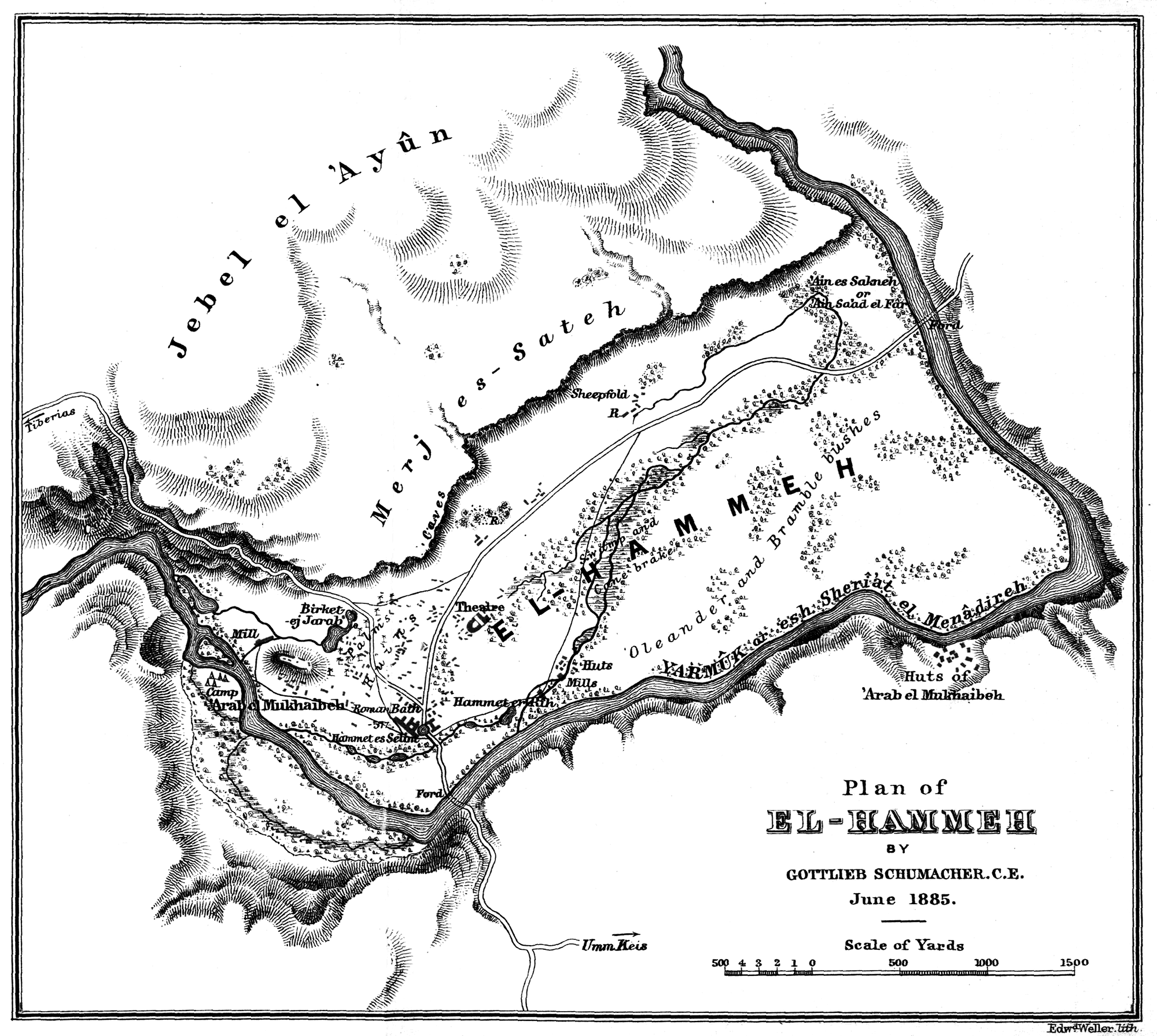
Map of el-Hamma in 1885

Al-Hamma appeared in Ottoman tax registers compiled in 1596 under the name of Hammat Jur, in the Nahiyas of Gawr, of the Liwa of Ajloun. It was indicated as empty (hali), though taxes were paid on a watermill, in addition to a fixed sum.

In 1875, the French explorer Victor Guérin visited the village.

In 1905, the Jezreel Valley railway opened, linking Haifa via Samakh and Al-Hamma to the Hejaz Railway at Daraa.

=== British Mandate ===
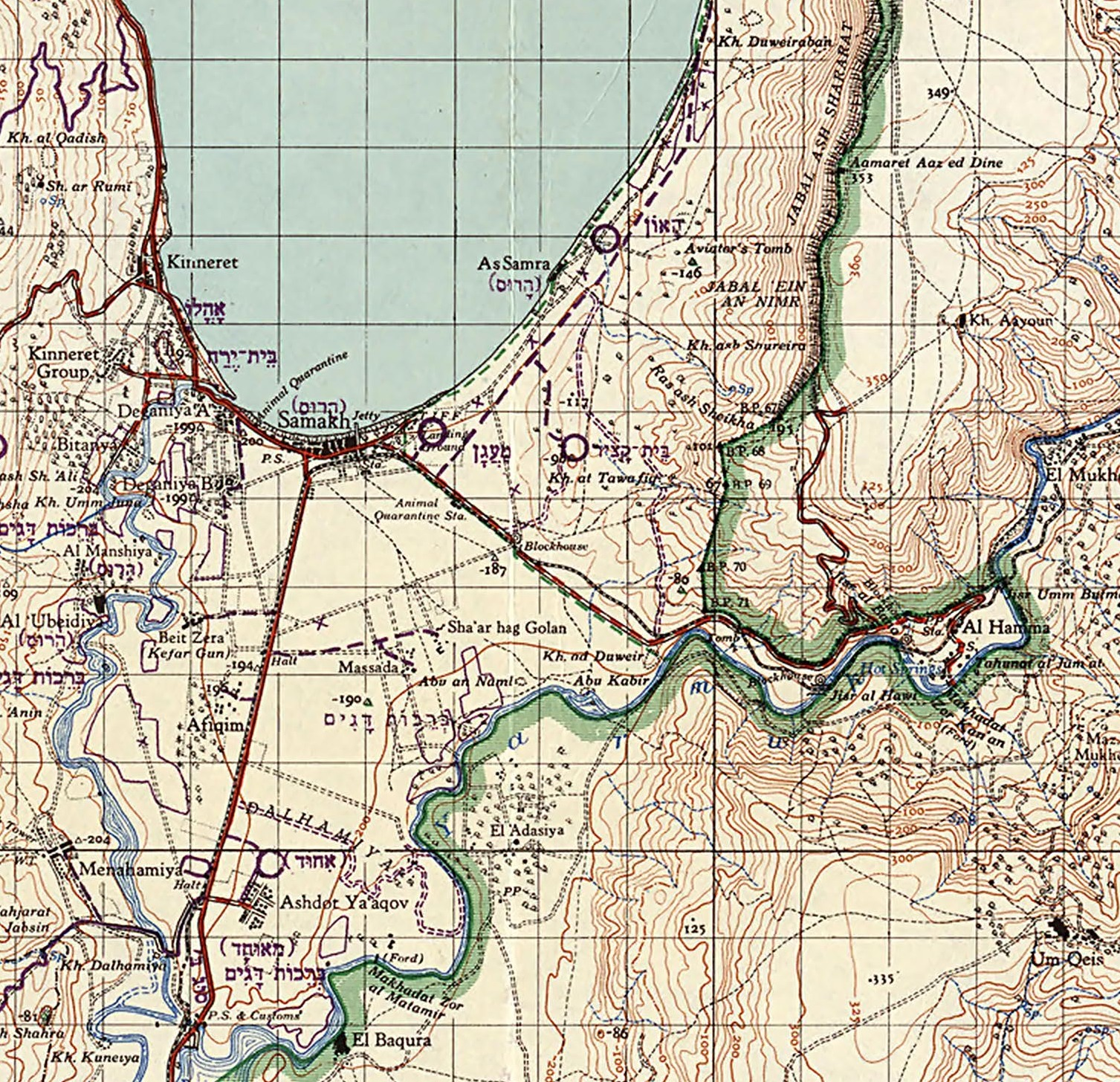
This 1942 Survey of Palestine map shows the Al-Hamma salient.

In the 1922 census of Palestine, conducted by the British Mandate authorities, Samakh and Al-Hamma were counted together, reaching a total population of 976. Of these, 922 were Muslims, 28 Jews, 1 Baháʼí and 25 Christians; where the Christians were 6 Orthodox, 1 Roman Catholic, 2 Melkite, 11 Armenian and 5 Anglican. At the time of the 1931 census, the village had 46 occupied houses and a population of 170 Muslims, 1 Jew and 1 Christian.

In 1936, a Lebanese businessman, Sulayman Nasif, was given a concession to develop the local springs, which became a popular place to visit, both for local Palestinians and other Arabs. In the 1945 statistics, the village had a population of 290 Muslims, who cultivated a total of 1,105 dunums of land. The villagers were mostly Muslim and Al-Hamma had a large mosque with a fountain in the front courtyard.

=== 1948 and aftermath ===
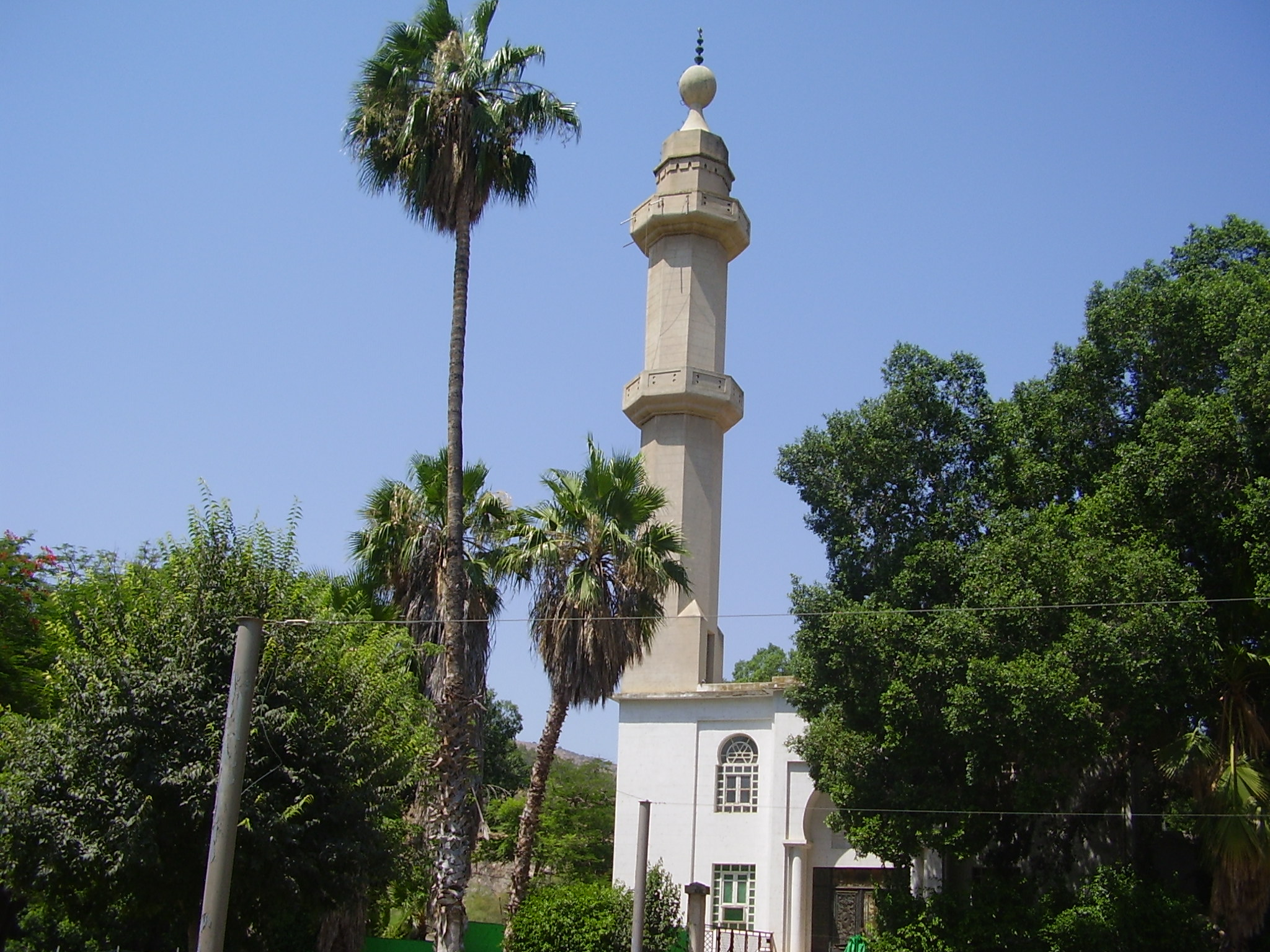
Al-Hamma mosque, in 2011

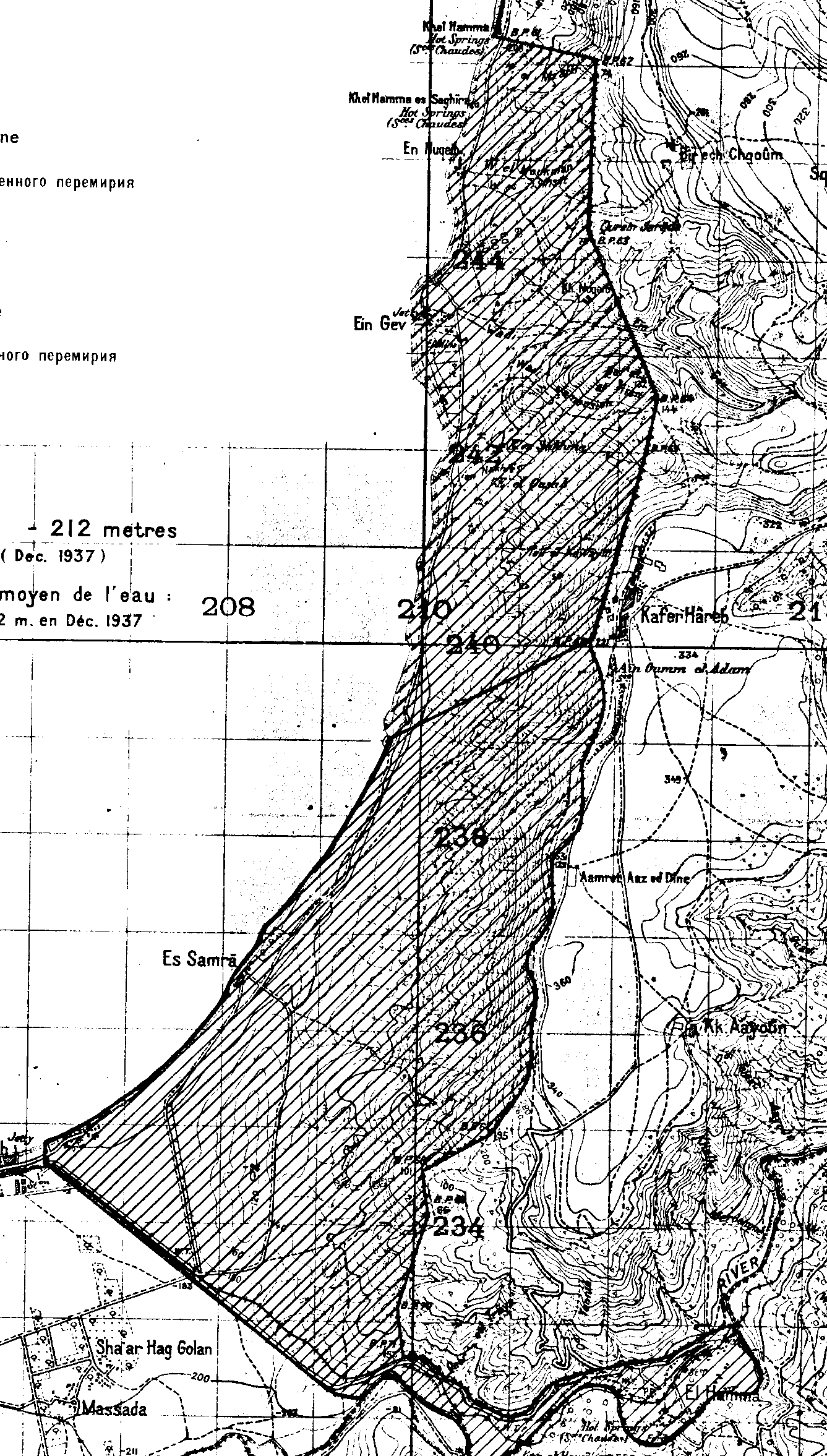
Ein Gev - Al Samra - Al Hamma Demilitarized Zone, per the Israel–Syria Mixed Armistice Commission

During the early part of the 1948 Palestine war, some Palestinian inhabitants of Tiberias fled to Al-Hamma during the unrest in March and April that year. A local leader from Tiberias, Sidqi al Tabari, made "desperate efforts" (according to Israeli sources) to bring the citizens back. The people who had fled to al-Hamma from Tiberias were "ordered back and, in fact, returned".

According to Morris, many villagers in the area had fled or been expelled to Syria during April and early May 1948. However, on 16 May, the villages came under Syrian control and many inhabitants returned. After the war, according to the armistice agreements of 1949 between Israel and Syria, it was determined that a string of villages, including Al-Hamma, Nuqeib, Al-Samra in the Tiberias Subdistrict, as well as Kirad al-Baqqara and Kirad al-Ghannama further north in the Safad Subdistrict, would be included the demilitarized zone (DMZ) between Israel and Syria. The villagers and their property were formally protected by Article V of the Israeli-Syrian agreement of 20 July that year. However, Israel wanted the 2,200 Palestinian inhabitants moved to Syria. The Israeli military thought that the inhabitants of the DMZ remained loyal to Syria and they suspected them of helping Syrian intelligence. Local Jewish settlers and law enforcement suspected the villagers of petty crimes. Morris also notes that Israeli settlers and settlement agencies coveted the land of the local Palestinian Arabs.

Until 1951, Israel had never patrolled or occupied al-Hamma. However, in the spring of that year, Israel decided to assert its claimed sovereignty over the village. On 4 April that year, the IDF General Staff (ignoring protests from the Northern Command) sent two patrol vehicles towards the village. Since Israel was not allowed to have soldiers in the DMZ, the patrol was disguised as policemen. In what became known as the Al-Hamma Incident, seven Israeli soldiers were killed by the Syrians. The following day, four Israeli planes bombed the police station at Al-Hamma and a Syrian position at Al-Hadid. Two women were killed, and six people reported injured. According to Walid Khalidi, Israel then decided to "drive the villagers out", and proceeded to do so during 1949–1956. He described the village site in 1992:

The site has been converted into an Israeli tourist park (Hamat Gader), with parking facilities, swimming pools, and a small fishing pond. The deserted mosque still stands, and its minaret and marble columns are intact. Five buildings east of the village site are built of black basalt. The railroad station still exist and the name of the village is inscribed on its entrance. There are three more deserted buildings next to the station, as well as the remains of destroyed houses.

The area of al-Hamma is mentioned in the article 24 of the Palestinian national covenant in its 1964 version (al-mithaq al-qawmi al-Filastini), together with the West Bank and the Gaza strip.

== See also ==
- Hama (disambiguation)
- Hamat Gader, current name of the site and a tourist resort
- Gadara (now Umm Qais), the mother-city in antiquity

== Bibliography ==
- Barron, J. B., ed. (1923). Palestine: Report and General Abstracts of the Census of 1922. Government of Palestine.
- Guérin, V. (1880). Description Géographique Historique et Archéologique de la Palestine (in French). Vol. 3: Galilee, pt. 1. Paris: L'Imprimerie Nationale.
- Hadawi, S. (1970). Village Statistics of 1945: A Classification of Land and Area ownership in Palestine. Palestine Liberation Organization Research Center. Archived from the original on 2018-12-08.
- Hartal, Moshe (2010-10-05). "Hammat Gader, 'Ein el-Jarab". Hadashot Arkheologiyot – Excavations and Surveys in Israel (122). Israel Department of Antiquities and Museums. ISSN 1565-5334.
- Hütteroth, W.-D.; Abdulfattah, K. (1977). Historical Geography of Palestine, Transjordan and Southern Syria in the Late 16th Century. Erlanger Geographische Arbeiten, Sonderband 5. Erlangen, Germany: Vorstand der Fränkischen Geographischen Gesellschaft. ISBN 3-920405-41-2.
- Khalidi, W. (1992). All That Remains: The Palestinian Villages Occupied and Depopulated by Israel in 1948. Washington D.C.: Institute for Palestine Studies. ISBN 0-88728-224-5.
- Mills, E., ed. (1932). Census of Palestine 1931. Population of Villages, Towns and Administrative Areas. Jerusalem: Government of Palestine.
- Morris, B. (1993). Israel's Border Wars, 1949 - 1956. Arab Infiltration, Israeli Retaliation, and the Countdown to the Suez War. Oxford University Press. ISBN 0-19-827850-0.
- Morris, B. (2004). The Birth of the Palestinian Refugee Problem Revisited. Cambridge University Press. ISBN 978-0-521-00967-6.
- Sharon, M. (2013). Corpus Inscriptionum Arabicarum Palaestinae, H-I. Vol. 5. BRILL. ISBN 978-90-04-25097-0. (Sharon, 2013, p. 283)
