= Kirad al-Ghannama =

Kirad al-Ghannama كراد الغنامة
- Village
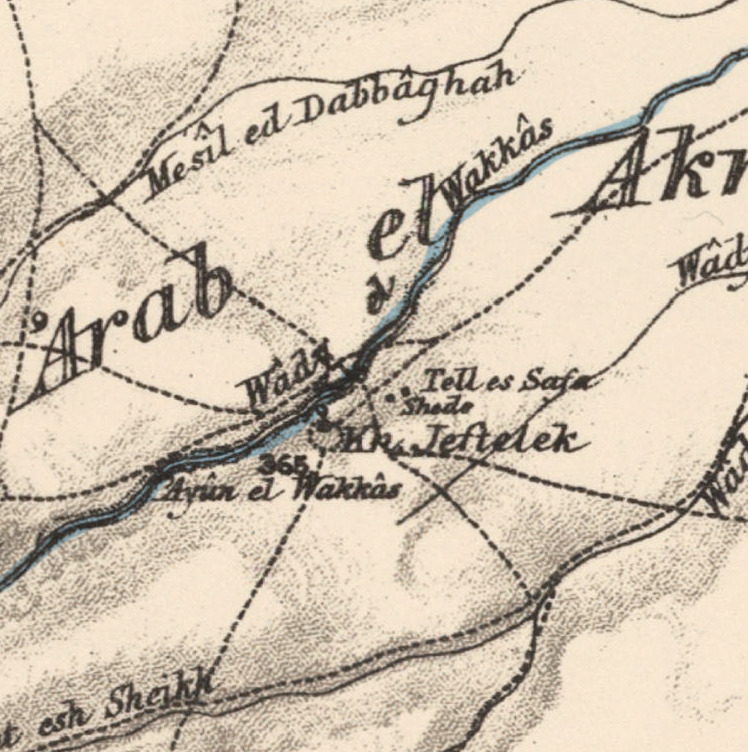
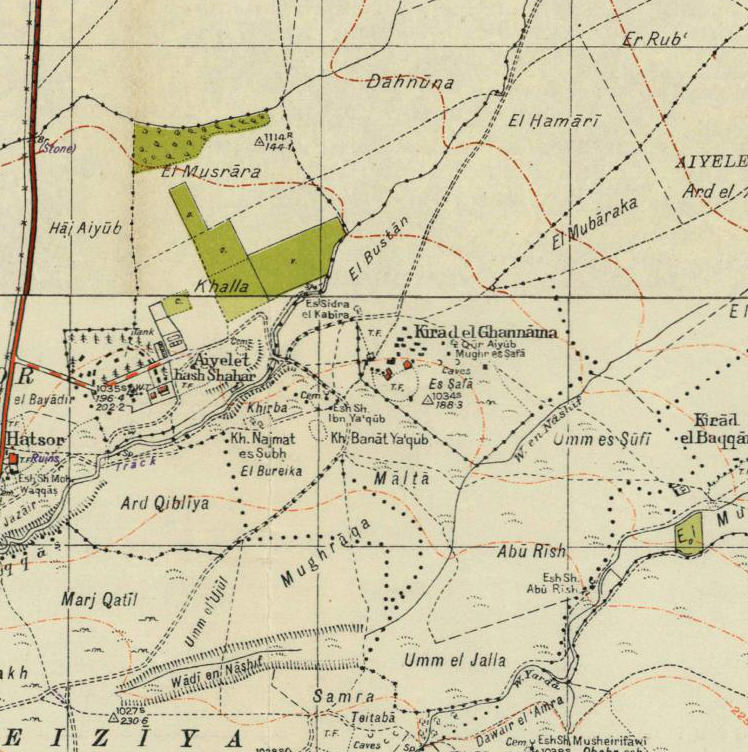
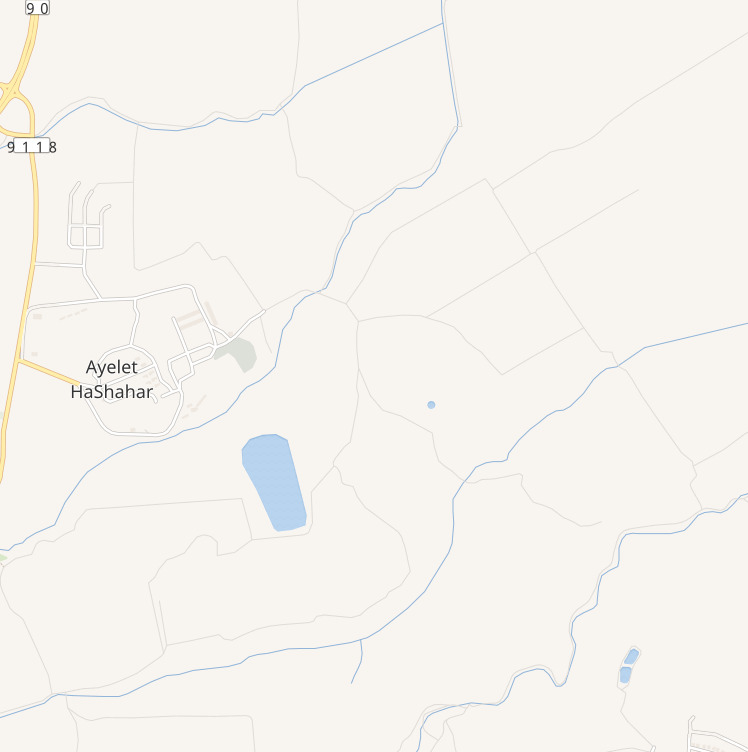
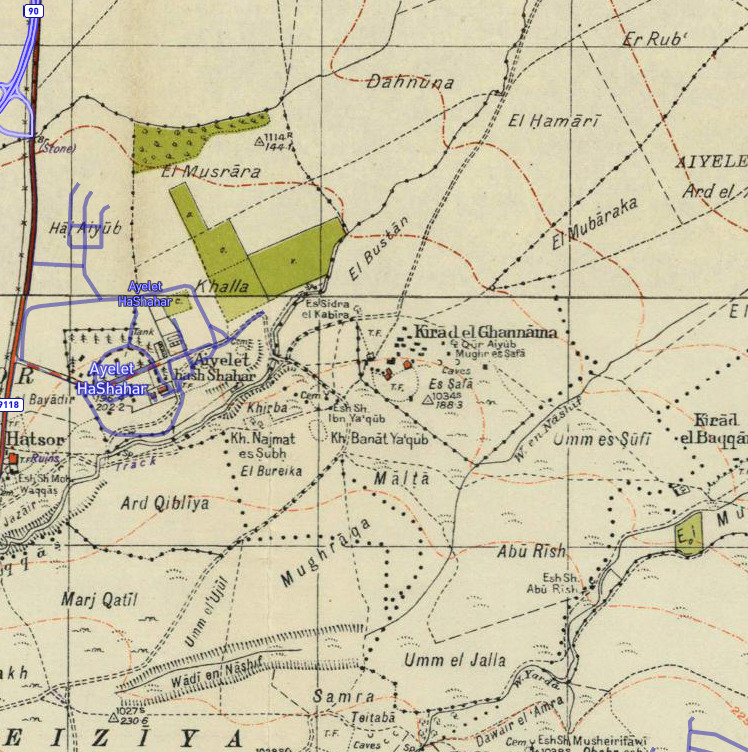
- 1870s map 1940s map modern map 1940s with modern overlay map A series of historical maps of the area around Kirad al-Ghannama (click the buttons)

- Location within Mandatory Palestine
- Coordinates: 33°01′18″N 35°35′14″E
- Palestine grid: 205/269
- Geopolitical entity: Mandatory Palestine
- Subdistrict: Safad
- Date of depopulation: April 22, 1948

Area
  - Total: 3,975 dunams (3.975 km^{2}; 1.535 sq mi)

Population (1945)
  - Total: 350
- Cause(s) of depopulation: Influence of nearby town's fall
- Current Localities: Ayyelet ha-Shahar and Gadot

Kirad al-Ghannama was a Palestinian Arab village in the Safad Subdistrict. It was depopulated during the 1947–1948 Civil War in Mandatory Palestine on April 22, 1948, by the Palmach's First Battalion of Operation Yiftach. It was located 11 km northeast of Safad. Wadi Mushayrifa ran between the two Kirad villages (al-Ghannama and al-Baqqara) and Wadi Waqqas supplied the village with its water requirements. The village contained the following khirbas: Khirbat Nijmat al-Subh, Tall al-Qadah, and Tall al-Safa.

== History ==
By the 1931 census Arab Ghannameh had 265 Muslims inhabitants, in a total of 54 houses.

In the 1945 statistics, its population was 350 Muslims, and the total land area were 3,975 dunams. Of this, 77 dunams were for citrus and bananas, 20 dunams were irrigated or used for plantations, 3,451 for cereals, while 64 dunams were classified as urban land.

=== 1948, aftermath ===
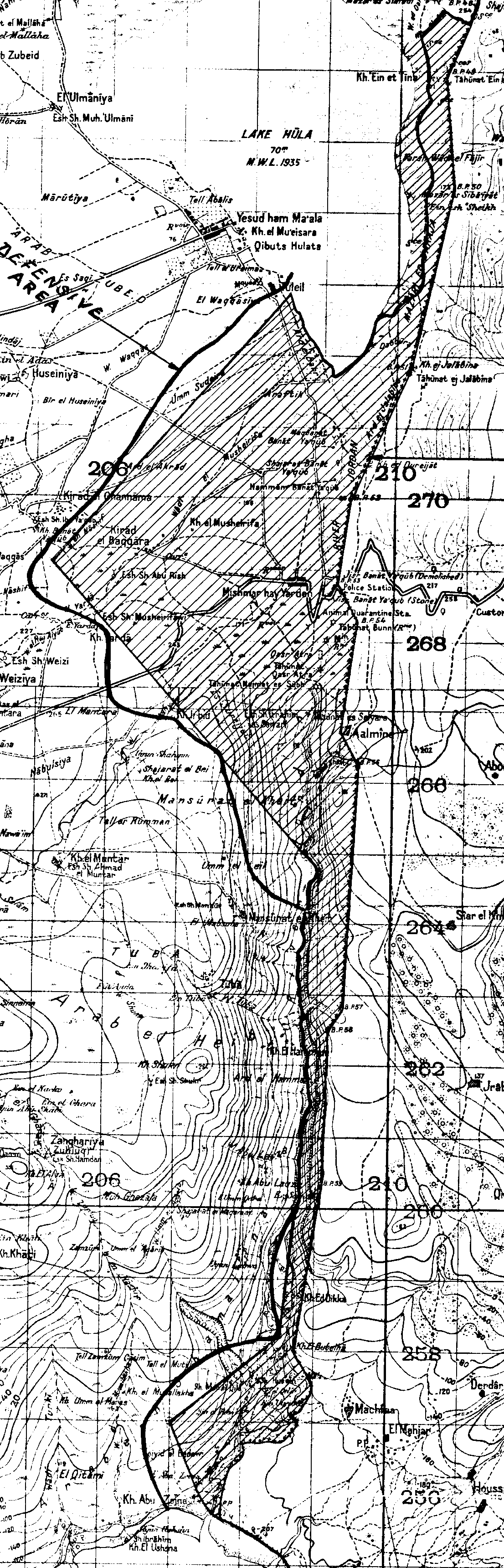
The village was in the Demilitarized Zone, per the Israel–Syria Mixed Armistice Commission.

After the 1948 Palestine war, according to the armistice agreements of 1949 Between Israel and Syria, it was determined that a string of villages, including Al-Nuqayb Al-Hamma, Al-Samra in the Tiberias Subdistrict and Kirad al-Baqqara and Kirad al-Ghannama further north in the Safad Subdistrict, would be included the demilitarized zone (DMZ) between Israel and Syria. The villagers and their property were formally protected by Article V of the Israeli-Syrian agreement of 20 July that year. However, Israel thought the villagers could pose a security threat, and Israeli settlers and settlement agencies coveted the land. Israel therefore wanted the Palestinian inhabitants, a total of 2,200 villagers, moved to Syria.

In the spring of 1951, Israel decided to assert its sovereignty over the DMZ, including "the transfer of Arab civilians from the area.." On the night of the 30 March they forcibly transferred all the 800 inhabitants of Kirad al-Ghannama and Kirad al-Baqqara to Sha'ab. A United Nations decision allowed the villagers to return, however, Israel pressured them to remain in Sha'ab. In spite of this, many of the villagers returned to their homes in the DMZ. In 1956 Israel expelled the two Khirad-villages again, and this time the sites were physically destroyed and ploughed over. Most of the villagers went to Syria, a few went back to Sha'ab.

== Bibliography ==
- Burns, E.L.M. (1962). Between Arab and Israeli. George G. Harrap.
- Department of Statistics (1945). Village Statistics, April, 1945. Government of Palestine.
- Hadawi, S. (1970). Village Statistics of 1945: A Classification of Land and Area ownership in Palestine. Palestine Liberation Organization Research Center.
- Khalidi, W. (1992). All That Remains:The Palestinian Villages Occupied and Depopulated by Israel in 1948. Washington D.C.: Institute for Palestine Studies. ISBN 0-88728-224-5.
- Mills, E., ed. (1932). Census of Palestine 1931. Population of Villages, Towns and Administrative Areas. Jerusalem: Government of Palestine.
- Morris, B. (1993). Israel's Border Wars 1949–1956: Arab Infiltration, Israeli Retaliation, and the Countdown to the Suez War. Oxford: Clarendon Press. ISBN 0-19-827850-0.
- Morris, B. (2004). The Birth of the Palestinian Refugee Problem Revisited. Cambridge University Press. ISBN 978-0-521-00967-6.
