= Kirad al-Baqqara =

Kirad al-Baqqara كراد البقارة
- Village
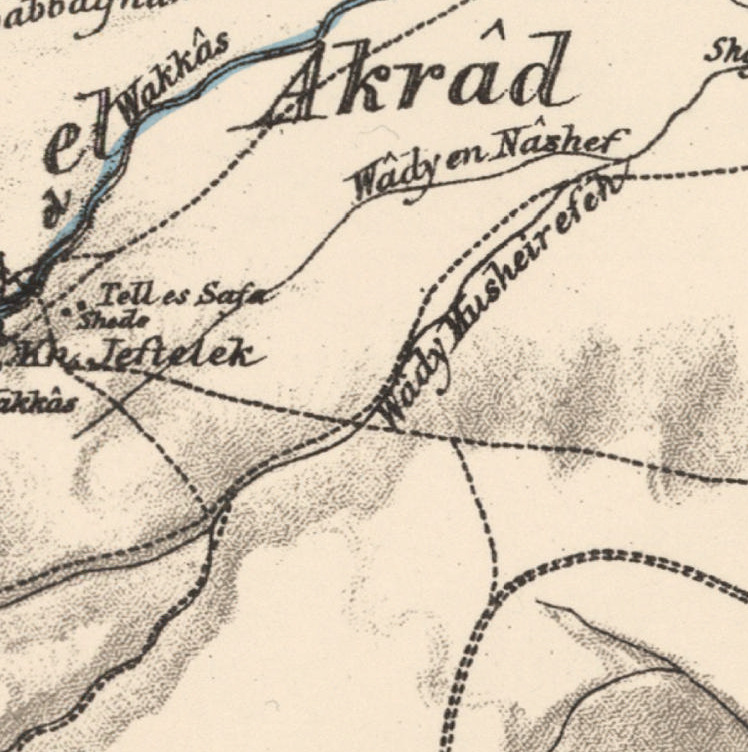
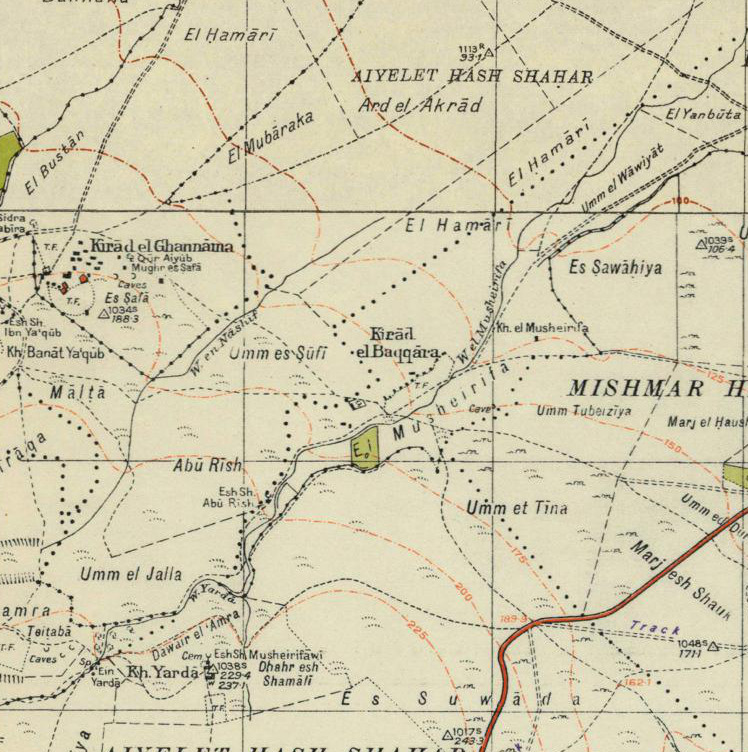
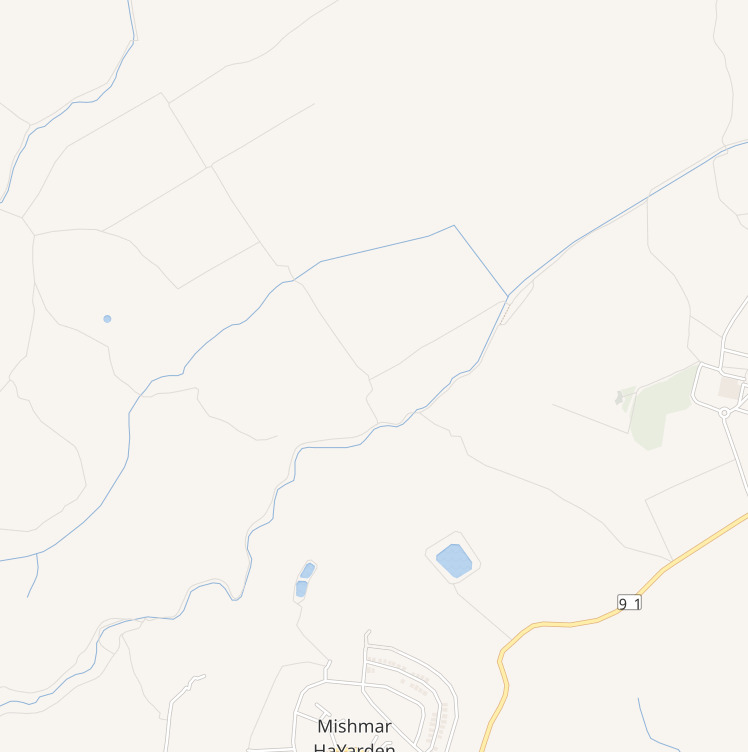
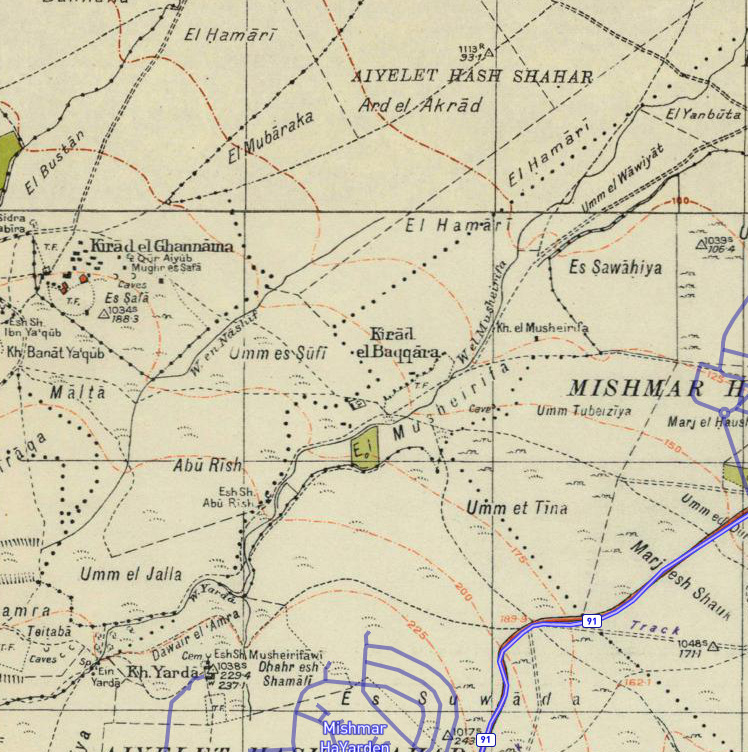
- 1870s map 1940s map modern map 1940s with modern overlay map A series of historical maps of the area around Kirad al-Baqqara (click the buttons)

- Location within Mandatory Palestine
- Coordinates: 33°01′07″N 35°36′04″E
- Palestine grid: 206/269
- Geopolitical entity: Mandatory Palestine
- Subdistrict: Safad
- Date of depopulation: April 22, 1948

Area
  - Total: 2,021 dunams (2.021 km^{2}; 0.780 sq mi)

Population (1945)
  - Total: 360
- Cause(s) of depopulation: Influence of nearby town's fall
- Current Localities: Gadot and Mishmar ha-Yarden

Kirad al-Baqqara (Arabic: كراد البقارة) was a Palestinian Arab village in the Safad Subdistrict. It was depopulated during the 1947–1948 Civil War in Mandatory Palestine on April 22, 1948, by the Palmach's First Battalion of Operation Yiftach. It was located 11 km northwest of Safad and Wadi Mushayrifa ran between the two Kirad villages (al-Ghannama and al-Baqqara).

== History ==
=== British Mandate era ===
In the British Mandate period, in the 1931 census Arab al-Baqqara had a population of 245 Muslims, in 34 houses.

By the 1945 statistics the population was 360 Muslims, with a total of 2,262 dunams of land, according to an official land and population survey. Of this, a total of 1,961 dunums were used for cereals; 60 dunums were irrigated or used for plantations, while 120 dunams were non-cultivable area.

=== 1948, aftermath ===
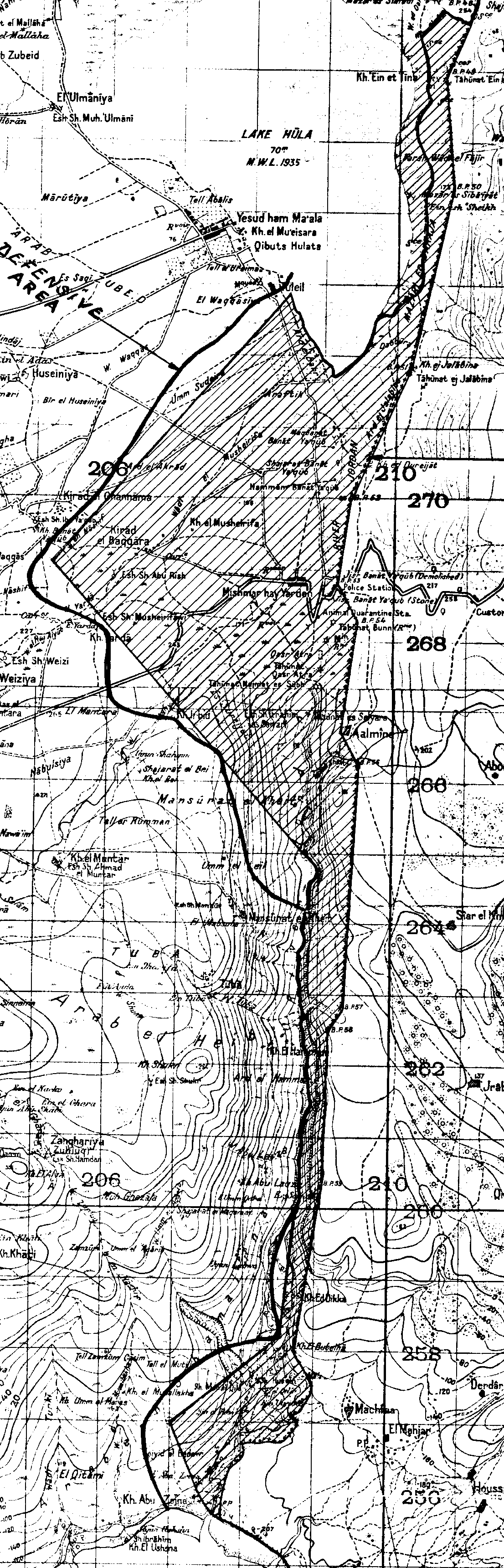
The village was in the Demilitarized Zone, per the Israel–Syria Mixed Armistice Commission.

In April 1948, large part of the population left the village after full-scale hostilities broke out.

After the 1948 Palestine war, according to the armistice agreements of 1949 Between Israel and Syria, it was determined that a string of villages, including Al-Nuqayb Al-Hamma, Al-Samra in the Tiberias Subdistrict and Kirad al-Baqqara and Kirad al-Ghannama further north in Safad Subdistrict, would be included the demilitarized zone (DMZ) between Israel and Syria. The villagers and their property were formally protected by Article V of the Israeli-Syrian agreement of 20 July that year. However, Israel thought the villagers could pose a security threat, and Israeli settlers and settlement agencies coveted the land. Israel therefore wanted the Palestinian inhabitants, a total of 2,200 villagers, moved to Syria.

In the spring of 1951, Israel decided to assert its sovereignty over the DMZ, including "the transfer of Arab civilians from the area." On the night of the 30 March they forcibly transferred all the 800 inhabitants of Kirad al-Ghannama and Kirad al-Baqqara to Sha'ab.

A United Nations decision allowed the villagers to return, however, Israel pressured them to remain in Sha'ab. In spite of this, many of the villagers returned to their homes in the DMZ. In 1956 Israel expelled the two Khirad-villages again, and this time the sites were physically destroyed and ploughed over. Most of the villagers went to Syria; a few went back to Sha'ab.

== Bibliography ==
- Burns, E.L.M. (1962). Between Arab and Israeli. George G. Harrap. (p.115-18. Cited in Morris, 1993, p. 362)
- Department of Statistics (1945). Village Statistics, April, 1945. Government of Palestine.
- Hadawi, S. (1970). Village Statistics of 1945: A Classification of Land and Area ownership in Palestine. Palestine Liberation Organization Research Center.
- Khalidi, W. (1992). All That Remains: The Palestinian Villages Occupied and Depopulated by Israel in 1948. Washington D.C.: Institute for Palestine Studies. ISBN 0-88728-224-5.
- Mills, E., ed. (1932). Census of Palestine 1931. Population of Villages, Towns and Administrative Areas. Jerusalem: Government of Palestine.
- Morris, B. (1993). Israel's Border Wars 1949–1956: Arab Infiltration, Israeli Retaliation, and the Countdown to the Suez War. Oxford: Clarendon Press. ISBN 0-19-827850-0.
- Morris, B. (2004). The Birth of the Palestinian Refugee Problem Revisited. Cambridge University Press. ISBN 978-0-521-00967-6. (pp. 132, 539)
