= Al-Nuqayb =

- Village
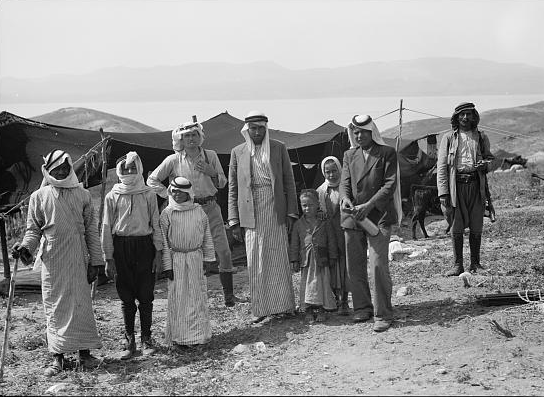
- Villagers of Al-Nuqayb, 1939

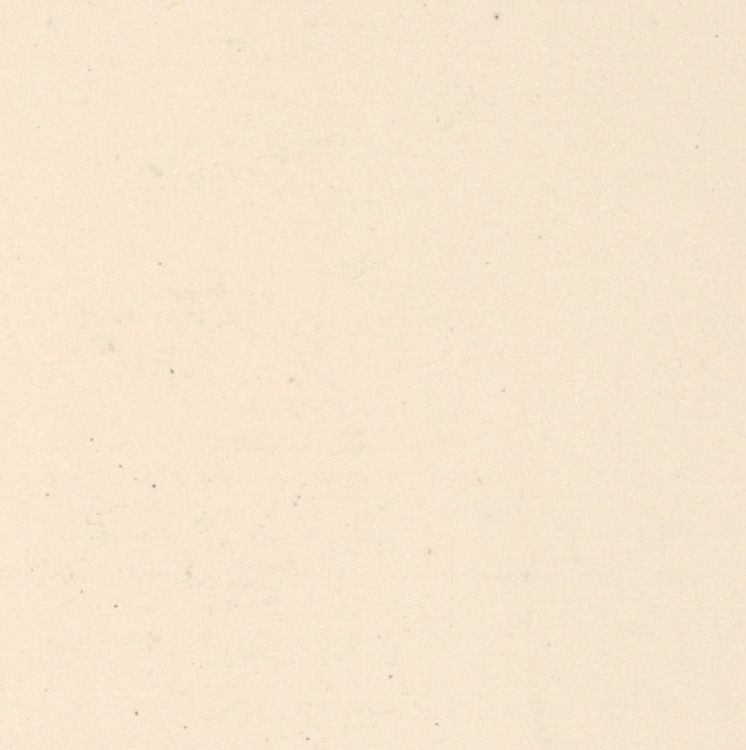
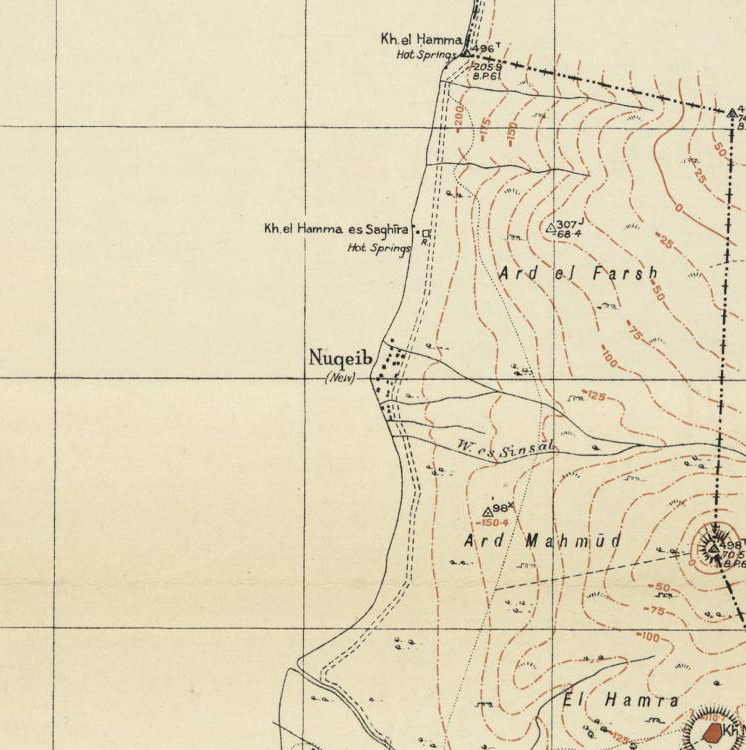
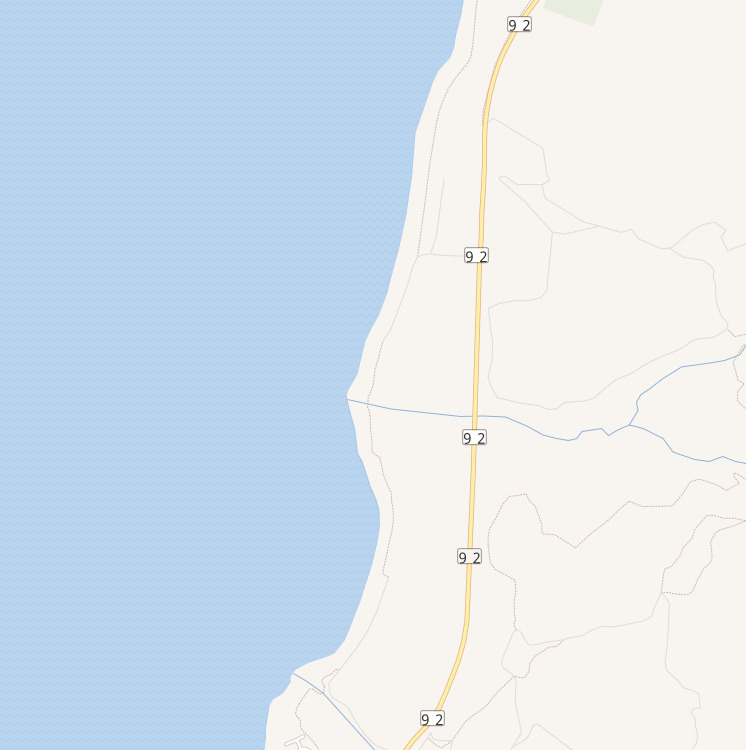
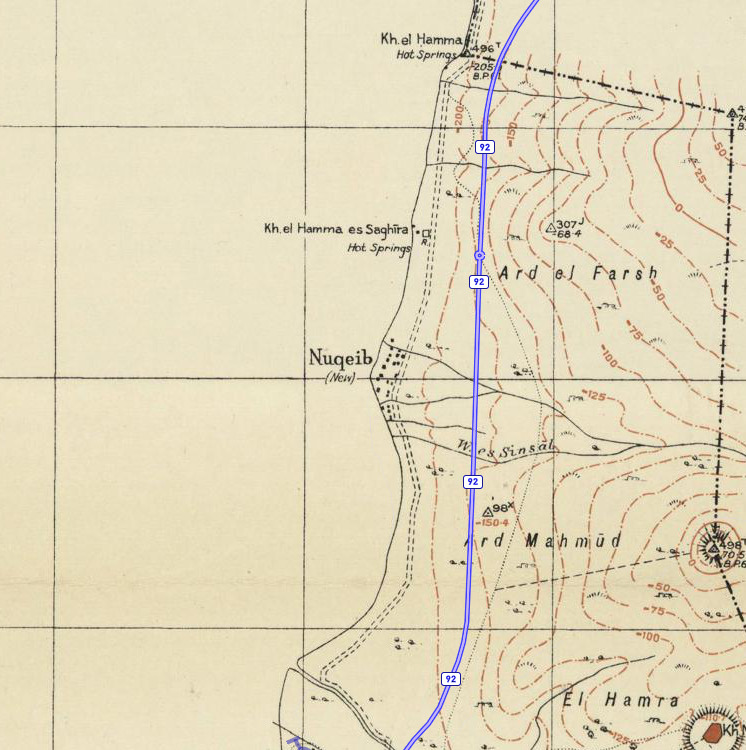
- 1870s map 1940s map modern map 1940s with modern overlay map A series of historical maps of the area around Al-Nuqayb

- Location within Mandatory Palestine
- Coordinates: 32°47′57″N 35°38′25″E
- Palestine grid: 210/245
- Geopolitical entity: Mandatory Palestine
- Subdistrict: Tiberias
- Date of depopulation: May 14, 1948

Area
  - Total: 976 dunams (97.6 ha; 241 acres)

Population (1945)
  - Total: 310
- Cause(s) of depopulation: Expulsion by Yishuv forces
- Current Localities: Ein Gev

Al-Nuqayb was a Palestinian Arab village in the Tiberias Subdistrict. It was depopulated during the 1948 Arab-Israeli War on May 15, 1948. It was located 10 km east across the lake from Tiberias. bordering the Wadi al-Muzaffar and Wadi Samakh. al-Nuqayb was named after the Bedouin tribe of 'Arab al-Nuqayb.

== Location ==
The village was located on the eastern shore of Lake Tiberias, with the fortress Qal'at al-Hisn located just to the east.

== History ==
In the 1880s most of the village land was purchased by the Bahá'u'lláh, while the villagers continued to farm as tenant farmers.

=== British Mandate era ===
In the 1920s, the land the Bahá'u'lláh had purchased was sold to the JNF. At the time of the 1922 census of Palestine conducted by the British Mandate authorities, Nuqhaib had a population of 103 Muslims, increasing in the 1931 census to 287 Muslims, in 60 houses.

The Kibbutz of Ein Gev was established in 1937, 1,5 km south of the village site.

In 1944/1945, the village had a population of 320 Muslims, with a total of 967 dunams of land. Of this, 131 dunams were irrigated or used for plantations, 797 were used for cereals, while 30 dunams were classified as built-up (urban) land.

=== 1948, aftermath ===
After the 1948 Palestine war, according to the armistice agreements of 1949 Between Israel and Syria, it was determined that a string of villages, including Nuqeib, Al-Hamma, Al-Samra in the Tiberias Subdistrict and Kirad al-Baqqara and Kirad al-Ghannama further north in the Safad Subdistrict, would be included the demilitarized zone (DMZ) between Israel and Syria. The villagers and their property were formally protected by Article V of the Israeli-Syrian agreement of 20 July that year. However, The people on the Kibbutz were subjected to continual attacks, making farming difficult and forcing the villagers to turn to fishing as their primary form of livelihood. In 1948, the Syrians attacked the kibbutz. Palestinian inhabitants, a total of 2,200 villagers, moved to Syria. Most of the villagers eventually moved to Syria, while some relocated to Sha'ab.

In 1992 the village site was described: "The site is fenced in and covered with thorny grass and various kinds of trees, such as Christ's-thorn trees. Piles of stones and the remains of walls can be seen. Part of the surrounding land is cultivated by the nearby settlement, and the remainder is used as a grazing area by Israelis."

== Bibliography ==
- Barron, J. B., ed. (1923). Palestine: Report and General Abstracts of the Census of 1922. Government of Palestine.
- Department of Statistics (1945). Village Statistics, April, 1945. Government of Palestine.
- Hadawi, S. (1970). Village Statistics of 1945: A Classification of Land and Area ownership in Palestine. Palestine Liberation Organization Research Center. Archived from the original on 2018-12-08.
- Khalidi, W. (1992). All That Remains: The Palestinian Villages Occupied and Depopulated by Israel in 1948. Washington D.C.: Institute for Palestine Studies. ISBN 0-88728-224-5.
- Mills, E., ed. (1932). Census of Palestine 1931. Population of Villages, Towns and Administrative Areas. Jerusalem: Government of Palestine.
- Morris, B. (2004). The Birth of the Palestinian Refugee Problem Revisited. Cambridge University Press. ISBN 978-0-521-00967-6.
