= Al-Samra =

Al-Samra السمرا
- Village
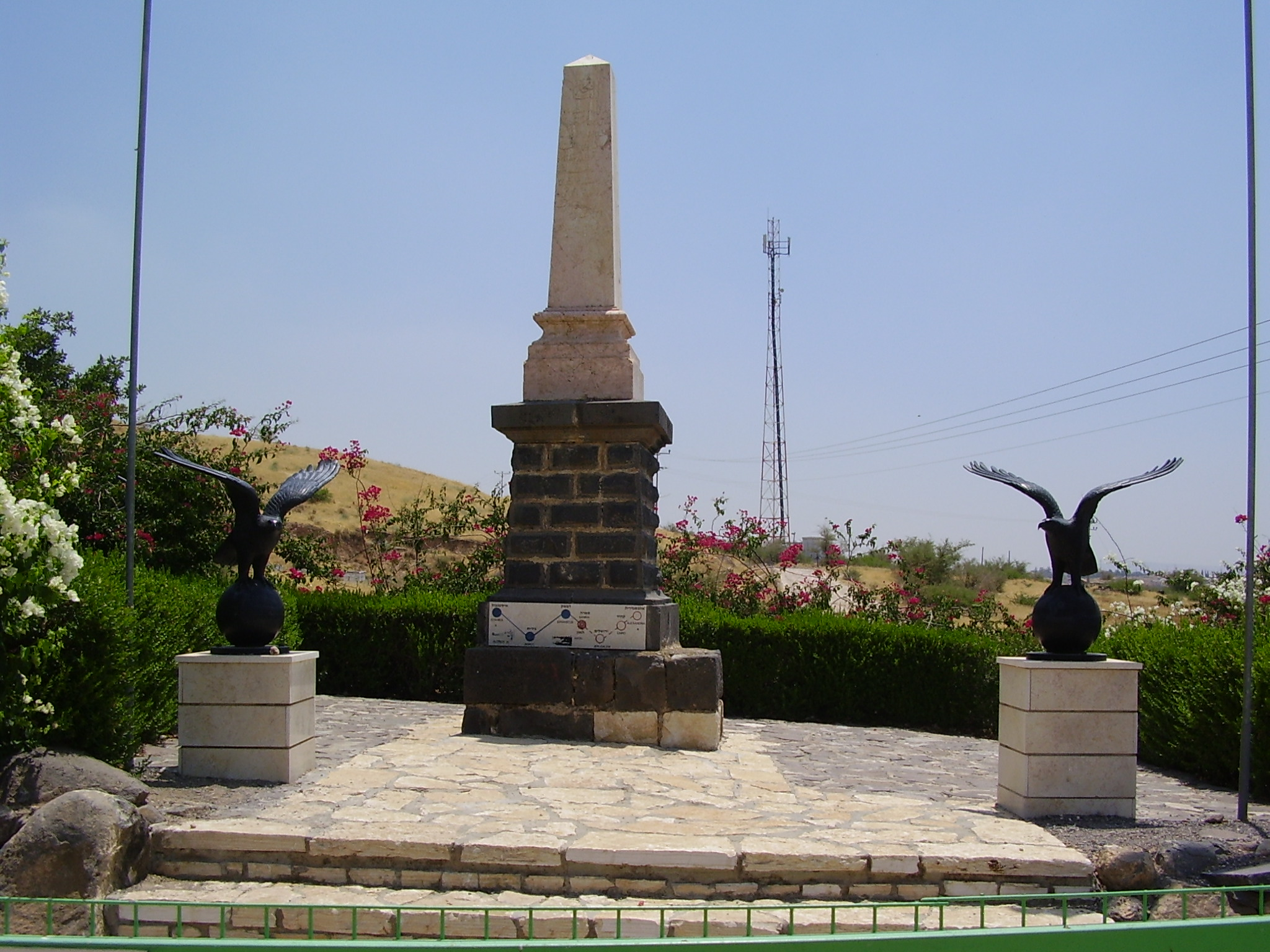
- A 1914 Ottoman memorial for two killed pilots, 1,5 km east of the village site

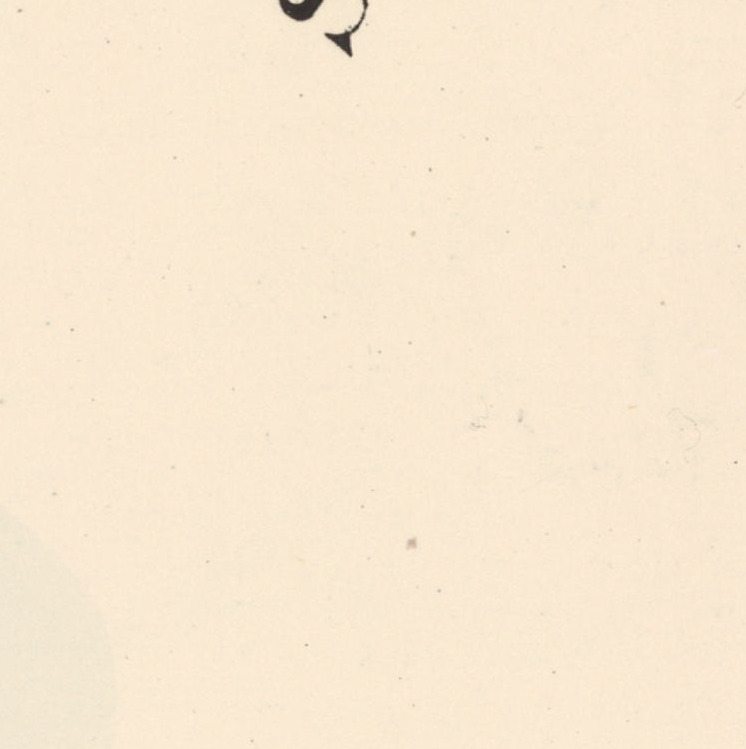
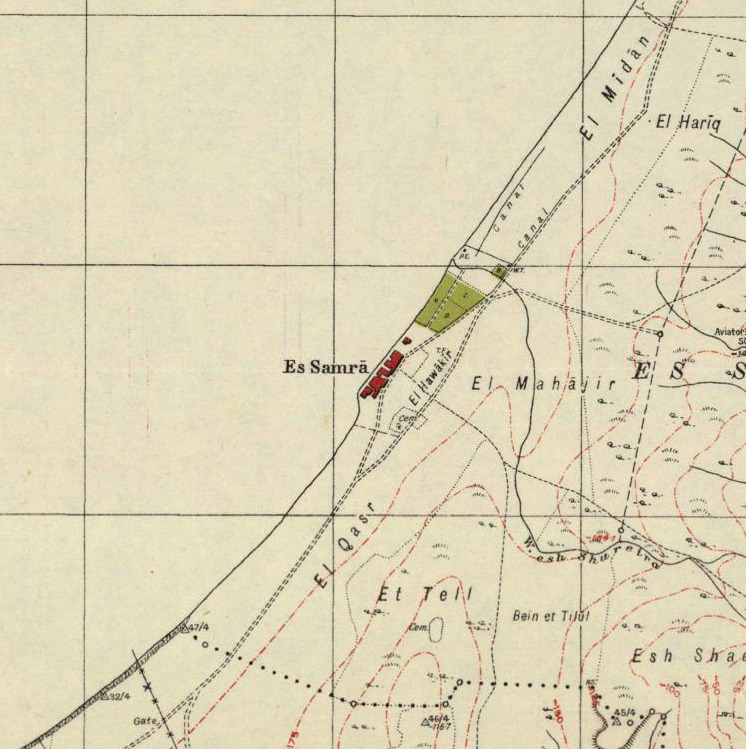
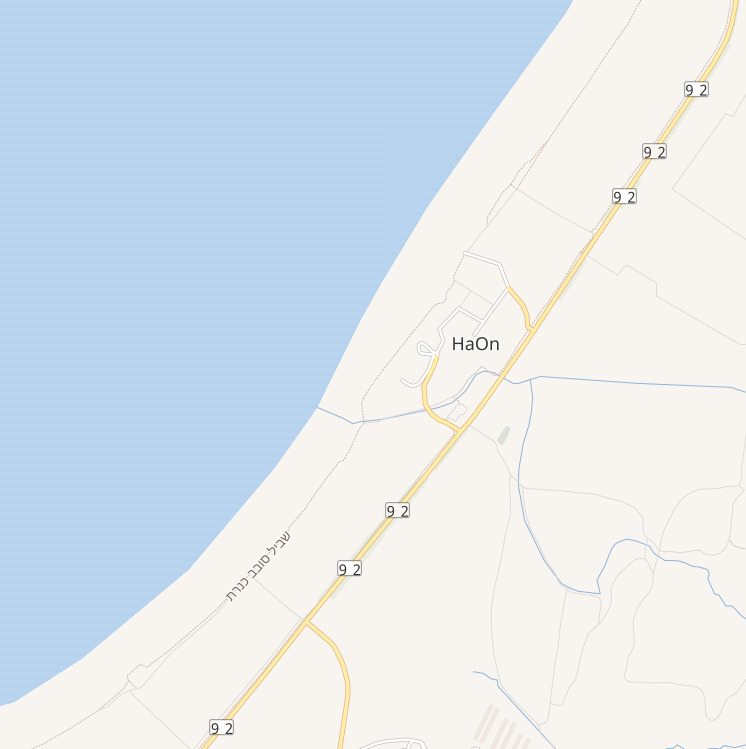
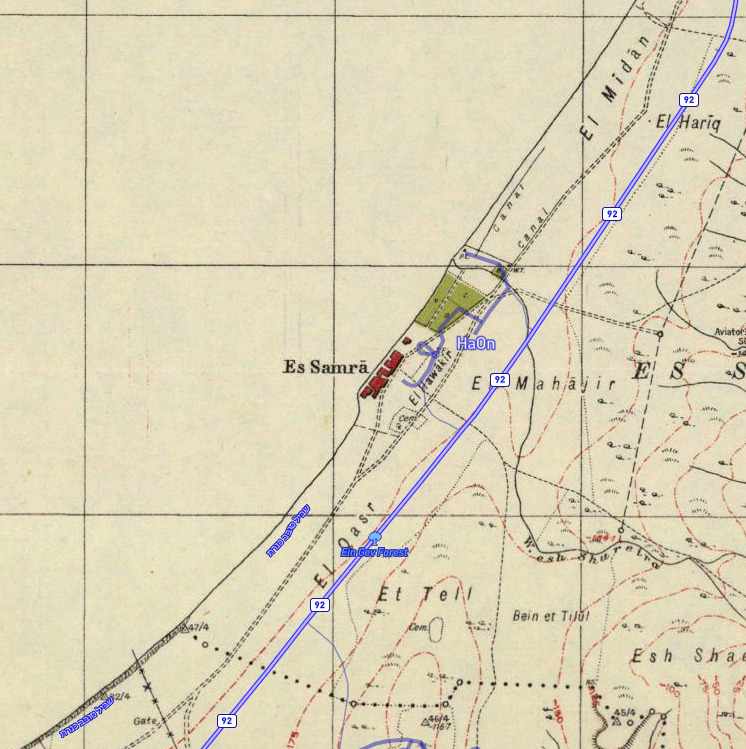
- 1870s map 1940s map modern map 1940s with modern overlay map A series of historical maps of the area around Al-Samra (click the buttons)

- Location within Mandatory Palestine
- Coordinates: 32°43′23″N 35°37′02″E
- Palestine grid: 208/236
- Geopolitical entity: Mandatory Palestine
- Subdistrict: Tiberias
- Date of depopulation: April 21, 1948

Population (1945)
  - Total: 290
- Cause(s) of depopulation: Influence of nearby town's fall
- Current Localities: HaOn

Al-Samra (Arabic: السمرا) was a Palestinian Arab village in the Tiberias Subdistrict. It was depopulated on April 21, 1948, during the 1947–1948 Civil War in Mandatory Palestine. It was located 10 km southeast of Tiberias.

== History ==
The village had a mosque and several khirbas (ruined sites) including Khirbat al-Tawafiq and Khirbat Duwayraban.

=== Late Ottoman period ===
In the early 19th century, Johann Ludwig Burckhardt noted it as the only village on the eastern shore of Lake Tiberias, and that it had some ancient buildings.

In 1838, Edward Robinson was told that the village, Khurbet es-Sumrah, was on the eastern shore of the lake. The villagers were Muslim.

In 1875, Victor Guérin found here large ruins, which he misidentified as Hippos.

A population list from about 1887 showed es Samr (east shore) to have about 180 inhabitants; 20 Druze and 160 Muslims.

In 1914, an Ottoman airplane, on its way from Istanbul to Cairo, crashed by the village. Two pilots were killed. There is an Ottoman memorial to the event, about 1,5 km east of the village site. Yüzbaşı Fethi Bey, one of the first pilots of the Ottoman Air Force, was one of the pilots killed.

=== British Mandate period ===
In the 1922 census of Palestine conducted by the British Mandate authorities, the population of Samra was 157 Muslims, increasing in the 1931 census to 237; 232 Muslims and 5 Baháʼís, in a total of 50 houses.

In the 1945 statistics, Es Samra had a population of 290; 280 Muslims and 10 classified as others, with 6,912 dunams of Arab-owned land. Of this, 30 dunams were used for citrus and bananas, 21 for plantations and irrigable land, 6,828 dunams for cereals, while 23 dunams were classified as built-up area.

=== 1948, aftermath ===
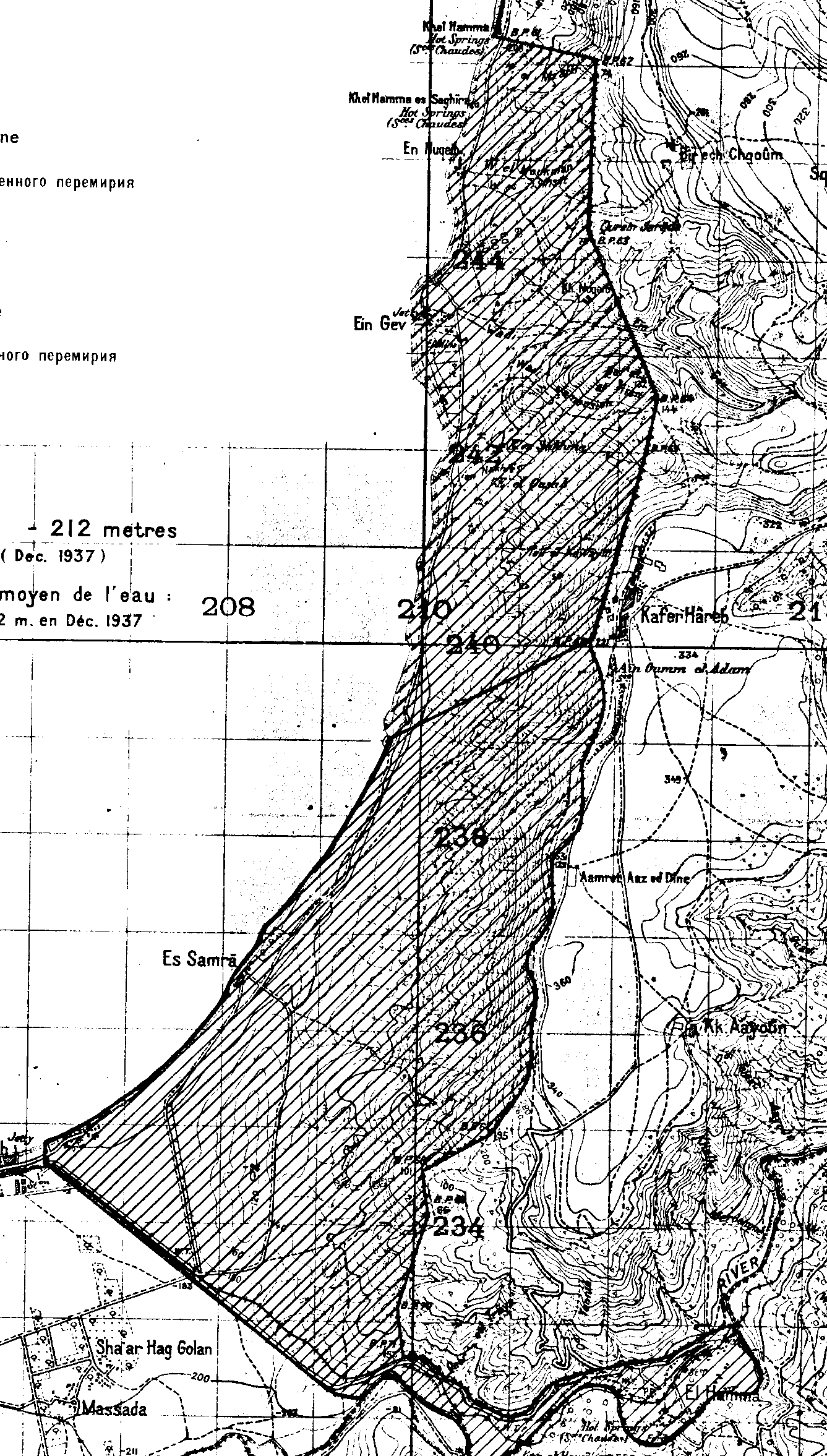
Ein Gev - Al Samra - Al Hamma Demilitarized Zone, per the Israel–Syria Mixed Armistice Commission.

The village became depopulated on April 21, 1948.

HaOn was established on village land, north of the village site, in 1949.

In 1992, Walid Khalidi described the village site: "Nothing remains of the village houses. A tourist resort, which consists of a few cabins and small houses, has been established on part of the village site. Other parts of the site are covered with trees. The surrounding land is cultivated by Israelis."

== Sources ==
- Barron, J. B., ed. (1923). Palestine: Report and General Abstracts of the Census of 1922. Government of Palestine.
- Burckhardt, J.L. (1822). Travels in Syria and the Holy Land. London: J. Murray.
- Department of Statistics (1945). Village Statistics, April, 1945. Government of Palestine.
- Guérin, V. (1880). Description Géographique Historique et Archéologique de la Palestine (in French). Vol. 3: Galilee, pt. 1. Paris: L'Imprimerie Nationale.
- Hadawi, S. (1970). Village Statistics of 1945: A Classification of Land and Area ownership in Palestine. Palestine Liberation Organization Research Center. Archived from the original on 2018-12-08.
- Khalidi, W. (1992). All That Remains: The Palestinian Villages Occupied and Depopulated by Israel in 1948. Washington D.C.: Institute for Palestine Studies. ISBN 0-88728-224-5.
- Mills, E., ed. (1932). Census of Palestine 1931. Population of Villages, Towns and Administrative Areas. Jerusalem: Government of Palestine.
- Morris, B. (2004). The Birth of the Palestinian Refugee Problem Revisited. Cambridge University Press. ISBN 978-0-521-00967-6.
- Robinson, E.; Smith, E. (1841). Biblical Researches in Palestine, Mount Sinai and Arabia Petraea: A Journal of Travels in the year 1838. Vol. 3. Boston: Crocker & Brewster.
- Schumacher, G. (1888). "Population list of the Liwa of Akka". Quarterly Statement - Palestine Exploration Fund. 20: 169–191.
