= Israel–Syria Mixed Armistice Commission =

Commission overseeing Israeli–Syrian ceasefire after the 1948 Arab-Israeli war

Map of the Golan Heights with demilitarized zone and demarcation line between Israel and Syria

The Israel–Syria Mixed Armistice Commission (ISMAC) was the United Nations commission for observing the armistice between Israel and Syria after the 1948 Arab–Israeli War, as part of the Mixed Armistice Commissions (MAC). The fourth and last truce agreement, the 1949 armistice agreement, was signed between Israel and Syria on 20 July 1949 on Hill 232 near Mahanayim, ending the formal conflict in the former Mandatory Palestine. The Israeli side was represented by Lieutenant Colonel Mordechai Maklef, Yehoshua Penman and Shabtai Rosenne, while the Syrian side was represented by Colonel Fawzi Selo, Lieutenant Colonel Mohamed Nasser and Captain Afif Sizri. While the armistice agreements with Syria concluded the 1948 Arab–Israeli War, they did not mark the end of the Arab–Israeli conflict.

A feature of the Israeli-Syrian General Armistice Agreement (GAA) was the provision for the establishment of a special demilitarized zone (DMZ) between the countries. The DMZ established by the GAA between Israel and Syria was "defined with a view toward separating the armed forces of the two parties in such manner as to minimize the possibility of friction and incident, while providing for the gradual restoration of normal civilian life in the area of the DMZ, without prejudice to the ultimate settlement". This provision had to be made because of the divergent viewpoints of the two parties during the armistice negotiations as to the sovereignty of the areas within the boundaries of the former Mandatory Palestine, which had been occupied by Syrian troops. A compromise agreement was finally reached under which the disputed areas were to be completely demilitarized. The armistice demarcation lines between Syria and Israel outside of the DMZ coincided with the international boundary.

The Israeli-Syrian DMZ comprised 250 square kilometres of land, divided into three areas, to the east and to the northeast of the Sea of Galilee. Under the provisions of the GAA, the Chairman of the Israeli-Syrian Mixed Armistice Commission (ISMAC) was given responsibility for the "gradual restoration of normal civilian life in the area" and it was his task to authorize the "return of civilians to villages and settlements in the DMZ". The chairman of the Israel-Syrian Mixed Armistice Commission was given duties and powers in addition to those held by the chairman of the other three Mixed Armistice Commissions.

== Headquarters ==
The Headquarters of the ISMAC was situated at the Customs House near Daughters of Jacob Bridge and at Mahanayim, The overall HQ of the controlling body of the 4 MACs, the UNTSO, after 3 relocations ended up in Government House in Jerusalem.

== Background ==
With the instigation of the final truce to the 1948 Arab-Israeli War the only areas of the northern sector of former British Mandatatory Palestine not occupied by Israel were those areas along the Jordan River controlled by Syria. Israel insisted on retaining all the territory it had occupied that had been designated for an Arab state. However, it demanded that Syria not be allowed to remain in the areas that Syria had occupied. UN acting mediator Ralph Bunche was able to convince Syria to withdraw on the understanding that the sovereignty of the 3 Israel-Syria DMZs created (totalling 172 square kilometres or 66.5 square miles) would remain undetermined until a final peace settlement was achieved.

Practically, all the work carried out by the ISMAC was centered upon the problems arising in the DMZ. The pattern of disputes concerning the DMZ generally followed three lines:

(a) disputes about establishing of new and rebuilding of old settlements in the area;
(b) disputes about the number of civilians to be readmitted into the area; and
(c) disputes about the removal of military installations in the area.

On the first point: In 1950, a new kibbutz at Beit Katzir was established in the southern DMZ. Like most of their kibbutzim in troubled areas, it was fortified with trenches with a double-apron of barbed-wire fence from behind which its settlers sallied out to cultivate the surrounding land, digging irrigation canals to channel the water from the Sea of Galilee with such vigour that before long no Arab farmer in the area was allowed into the stretch of land between the kibbutz and the lake. The MAC decided that the new settlement at Beit Katzir erected by returning Israelis had been established without the agreement of the Chairman of the MAC, it was fenced in, so as to be more the nature of a military outpost and that the fence should therefore be removed. Israel complied with that decision.

The second point "the return of civilians" to the DMZ gave rise to a good deal of disputes. The chairman of the MAC could interpret his duties and powers under the GAA only in such a way so as to permit the return of Syrian and Israeli civilians in numbers corresponding to the number of Syrian and Israeli civilians prior to the end of the British Mandate. According to this principle, the MAC Chairman authorized Syrian and Israeli civilians to return to the DMZ to resume their civilian life there as of 8 September. By the end of January 1950, the number of Israelis returned to the area under this ruling, roughly equalled the number of Israelis who had resided there at the end of the mandatory regime.

The number of Syrians returned by the end of January 1950 amounted to approximately 75% of those living there at the expiration of the Mandate. At first, Syrian representatives opposed the ruling of the chairman and requested that the number of returning civilians be limited. At a later stage, however, the Syrian representatives accepted the Chairman of the MAC's ruling as to the number of returning refugees, but the Syrian delegation were still opposed to the MAC Chairman's ruling that new settlements may be erected by returning settlers, both Arab and Israeli.

This Syrian attitude appeared to the Chairman of the MAC to be partly motivated by the disparity of economic conditions under which the returning Arab and Israeli civilians live. The returning Israeli settlers were well equipped with building materials, machinery, and agricultural implements and were therefore, in a position to speedily establish permanent settlements that Syria considered of potential military value. On the other hand, returning Arab refugees often arrived completely destitute in their former villages, most of which have been leveled by Israeli forces prior to their withdrawal from the area after the signing of the Israeli-Syrian Armistice Agreement.

The Chairman of the ISMAC felt there was no doubt that the dispute could have been easily resolved if the economic conditions of civilians returning from both sides could have been somewhat equalized by providing the returning Arab refugees with building materials and with agricultural implements. However, the Chairman of the ISMAC and the Chief of Staff UNTSO had no means at their disposal to assist the rehabilitation of Arab refugees returning to their homes nor were they in a position officially to enlist the co-operation of any of the other United Nations agencies in the area that might conceivably be concerned with this problem. However, the representative in Beirut of the United Nations Relief for Palestine Refugees (fore runner of the United Nations Relief and Works Agency for Palestine Refugees established on 8 December 1949) and the International Red Cross did provide limited aid to the returning Arab refugees.

As to the third point, the ISMAC, with the co-operation of both parties, had by 12 February 1950 completed the removal of military installations, mines and fortifications from the demilitarized zones as specified in the GAA.

== Area of the DMZ ==
Section A (northern)

Section B (central)

Section C (southern)

Land ownership split in the three DMZ sections

The DMZ was split into three zones: northern, central and southern:

- Section A (c.1,000 acres): The northern sector of Al-'Abisiyya - Khan al-Duwayr at the extreme north of Palestine
- Section B (c.7,000 acres): The central sector from Mazari Ed-Daraja to Arab al-Shamalina to the northern shores of Lake Tiberias, and including the Daughters of Jacob Bridge
- Section C (c.8,750 acres): The southern sector, along the eastern of Lake Tiberias from Al-Nuqayb to Samakh, and including Al Hamma,

With the exception of Al-Hamma (c.423 acres), which was under Syrian control, all three sectors were administered by Israel.

== Failure of the Mixed Armistice Commission to hold regular meetings ==
As part of its dispute with Syria over use of the Demilitarized Zone created by the Israel-Syria Armistice Agreement, Israel from 1951 refused to attend meetings of the Israel–Syria Mixed Armistice Commission. The U.N. Security Council, in its resolution of 18 May 1951, noted that refusal to participate in Mixed Armistice Commission meetings was "inconsistent with the objectives and intent of the Armistice Agreement".

On 20 June 1951 Israel informed the UNTSO that it would no longer attend meetings of the Syrian/Israeli MAC as long as complaints involving the DMZs were on the agenda. Israel argued that Israel alone had sovereignty over the DMZs and that Syria had no rights and therefore, no standing to discuss the zones. Israel immobilized the MAC working within the DMZ. Israel also refused to allow UN observers to carry out a cadastral demarcation of the line of the DMZs and thereby no one was ever sure exactly where the line lay.

The Israel position concerning the competence of the MAC to deal with questions connected with the DMZ was a direct contradiction of the Syrian position on the same subject. The Israel position was set out in the following extracts from the memorandum from the Israel Ministry of Foreign Affairs of 27 December 1954:

"…The absence of any Syrian locus standi in the zone is demonstrated conclusively in the limitation of the competence of the Mixed Armistice Commission with regard to matters of the DMZ. According to paragraph 5 (c) of article V, it is the Chairman of the Commission (or the Chief of Staff), and not the Commission, of which Syria is a member, that is responsible for ensuring the implementation of article V, governing the DMZ. "... "It is evident ... that no distinction can be deduced between the Chairman's jurisdiction over civilian matters and his competence with regard to the military aspects of article V. Indeed, paragraph 5 (c) of that article defines the Chairman's responsibility as ensuring the full implementation of the article without any difference whatever between its civilian life clauses and its military provisions.

The principle of the personal responsibility of the ISMAC Chairman was followed in practice by the Israeli delegation throughout the years of the ISMAC existence, except when otherwise agreed to by Israel (as for instance in a number of MAC discussions held before 1951). The chairmen of the ISMAC had taken up and settled numerous questions concerning the DMZ directly with the Israeli representatives. From July 1954 to January 1955 at least, 15 such matters, regarding civilian as well as military questions of the zone, had been brought by the MAC Chairman before the Israel authorities.

Syria, however, persisted in Israel's opinion, to attempt to create for itself a position that would entitle it to intervene in a territory that lay outside its State boundaries, and in several instances questions concerning the DMZ had appeared at Syria's insistence on the agenda of the MAC. It was evident that Israel could not acquiesce in attempts by Syria to gain rights Israel felt it was not entitled to, and remained consistent in upholding what they felt was the basic tenet of the GAA: exclusion of Syria from any rights within the DMZ, even if this sometimes meant the Israeli delegation absenting itself from MAC meetings when Syria sought to intervene in questions affecting the zone.

The Syrian position on this matter was contained in the first part of the aide-memoire of the Syrian Ministry of Foreign Affairs. This aide-memoire also refers to the note verbale of the Syrian Ministry of Foreign Affairs to the Chief of Staff dated 17 June 1954 [S/3230]. The Syrian position may be summarized as follows: the MAC being competent to supervise the execution of the provisions of the GAA, including article V, relating to the DMZ, was empowered to deal with complaints submitted by the parties relating to the implementation of article V. Paragraph 5 (c) of article V of the armistice agreement refers to the responsibility of the Chairman of the MAC and UN observers for ensuring the full implementation of the article, whereas the first paragraph of article VII provides that the MAC shall supervise the execution of the provisions of the agreement.

Such conflicting views as to the competence of the MAC in relation to the DMZ resulted in the failure of the MAC to hold regular meetings since 20 June 1951, the Syrian delegation refusing to withdraw complaints relating to the DMZ from the list of complaints pending before the MAC, while the Israel delegation insists that such complaints be deleted.

"There are differences of opinion between the parties to the Armistice Agreement on the meaning of various provisions of article V, including those which relate to the Chairman's powers, but neither party requested an interpretation by the MAC in the manner established by Article VII of the agreement, and the Chairman has had to rely on his own interpretation, knowing that in many cases it would probably be found unacceptable by one party or by both and that the requests of the Chairman of the ISMAC were likely to be met with refusal on the ground that the Chairman of the ISMAC was exceeding his powers or acting in some other manner contrary to the provisions of the Armistice Agreement."

== DMZ and border incidents ==
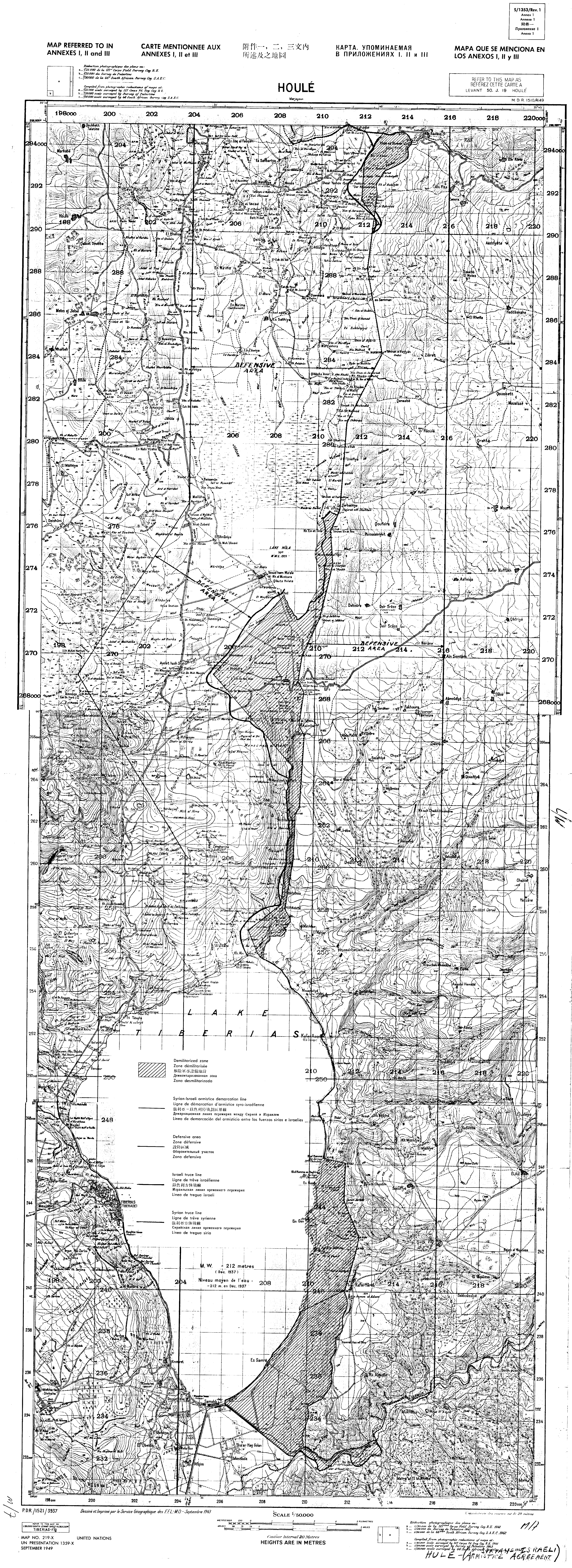
Official map of the DMZ

May 1951, Syrian military forces crossed into Israel at a point where the Jordan River meets the Sea of Galilee and occupied a hill. They were ejected by the Israel Defense Forces (IDF) after heavy fighting.

31 December 1952, Following incidents in the area of Tel Katzir, the Israel General Staff officer in charge of the Israeli delegation to the MAC stated that the terrain features prevailing in the area south-west of Sea of Galilee imposed certain security considerations, and that Israel considered that area as a security zone. The area east and south of Tel Katzir was a vital part of that security zone, and Israel could not accept the claim of free access of Arab farmers from Tawafiq to some fields within the area. The Chairman of the MAC did not recognize the Israeli claim that this area is vital to Israel's security.

The fighting in the spring of 1953 resulted in Syria managing to gain control of the village of al-Hamma in the southern zone, all of the tiny northern zone and the uninhabited narrow stretch of land on the east side of the Jordan River in the central zone. Israel laid claim to the remainder, most of the southern zone and the entire central zone west of the Jordan River.

September 1953 Israel advanced plans to divert water to help irrigate the coastal Sharon Plain and eventually the Negev desert and launched a diversion project on a 14-kilometre (9 mi) channel midway between the Huleh Marshes and the Sea of Galilee in the central DMZ to be rapidly constructed. Syria claimed that it would dry up 4,900 hectares (12,000 acres) of Syrian land. The UNTSO Chief of Staff Major General Vagn Bennike of Denmark noted that the project was denying water to two Palestinian water mills, was drying up Palestinian farm land, and was a substantial military benefit to Israel against Syria. The Israeli response was to increase work. UN Security Council Resolution 100 "deemed it desirable" for Israel to suspend work started on 2 September "pending urgent examination of the question by the Council". Israel finally backed off by moving the intake out of the DMZ and for the next three years the US kept its economic sanctions by threatening to end aid channelled to Israel by the Foreign Operations Administration and insisting on tying the aid with Israel's behaviour. The Security Council ultimately rejected Syrian claims that the work was a violation of the Armistice Agreements and drainage works were resumed and the work was completed in 1957.

Syria claimed that on 30 June 1954, an Israel armoured vehicle attacked the Syrian post of El Koursi, situated on Syrian soil, with its 20mm gun. A similar Syrian claim was repeated for the following day. The Syrians alleged that on 1 July 1954 two Israeli armoured vehicles attacked the Syrian post of El Koursi with their 20mm and 57mm guns and further alleged that artillery fire continued for approximately one hour and forty-five minutes, causing material damage to the post.

Israeli kibbutzniks from Tel Katzir had been conducting illegal work using tractors on lands belonging to the civilian Arab population of the southern DMZ (Tawafiq) when on 5 December 1954 in the southern DMZ, the Syrians alleged that a group of 8 armed regular Israel police had fired on two civilians from Tawafiq.

8 December 1954 A party of 5 Israeli soldiers were captured several kilometres inside Syrian territory. The soldiers were subjected to excruciating torture by the Syrians. After interrogation they admitted to carrying out a mission to retrieve a phone tapping device.

12 December 1954 Israeli Air Force Meteors forced a Syrian Airways DC-3 Dakota to land at Lod airport, alleging the plane intruded into Israeli airspace. The passengers and crew were released two days later after completion of UN and Israeli inquiries. Syria denounced the incident as "a shocking act of aggression." Reporting to the Knesset's Foreign Affairs Defense Committee the following week, Foreign Minister Moshe Sharett stated that the plane had not been in Israeli airspace. Sharett and Avi Shlaim claim that the plane was forced down as a pretext to facilitate a prisoner exchange. In late December, the Armistice Commission declined to censure Israel for the incident when the deciding vote, Lieutenant Colonel Castonguay, abstained, arguing the issue was beyond the Commission's competence.

11 December 1955, under the command of Ariel Sharon, Israel sent two paratroop battalions backed by artillery and mortar batteries and attacked Syrian gun emplacements at Buteiha Farm and the village of Kursi (El Koursi) outside the DMZ, on the northeastern shore of the Sea of Galilee. 50 Syrians were killed and 30 Syrian soldiers taken prisoner. 6 Israeli troops were killed. The raid was prompted by repeated Syrian attacks on Israeli fishing in the Sea of Galilee.

30 October 1956, when Israel attacked Egypt across the Sinai peninsula in co-ordination with an Anglo-French attack on Suez, the remainder of the Palestinians living in the DMZs were driven into Syria.

== Glossary ==
- AOL - Area of Limitations
- AOS - Area of Separation
- DMZ - Demilitarised Zone
- HKJIMAC - Hashemite Kingdom of Jordan/Israel Mixed Armistice Commission
- ISMAC - Israel–Syria Mixed Armistice Commission
- MAC - Mixed Armistice Commissions
- OGE - Observer Group Egypt
- OGG - Observer Group Golan
- OGG-D - Observer Group Golan - Damascus
- OGG-T - Observer Group Golan - Tiberias
- OGL - Observer Group Lebanon
- UNDOF - United Nations Disengagement Observer Force
- UNEF - United Nations Emergency Force
- UNIFIL - United Nations Interim Force In Lebanon
- UNTSO - United Nations Truce Supervision Organization

== Bibliography ==
- Finkelstein, Norman G. (2003). Image and Reality of the Israel-Palestine Conflict, 2nd ed., New York: Verso. ISBN 1-85984-442-1.
- Shlaim, Avi (2000) "The Iron Wall Israel and the Arab world" Penguin Books ISBN 978-0-14-028870-4 ISBN 0-14-028870-8
- Ben-Dror, Elad (2016). Ralph Bunche and the Arab-Israeli Conflict: Mediation and the UN 1947–1949,. Routledge. ISBN 978-1138789883.
