= Al-Mansura, Safad =

Al-Mansura المنصوره
- Village
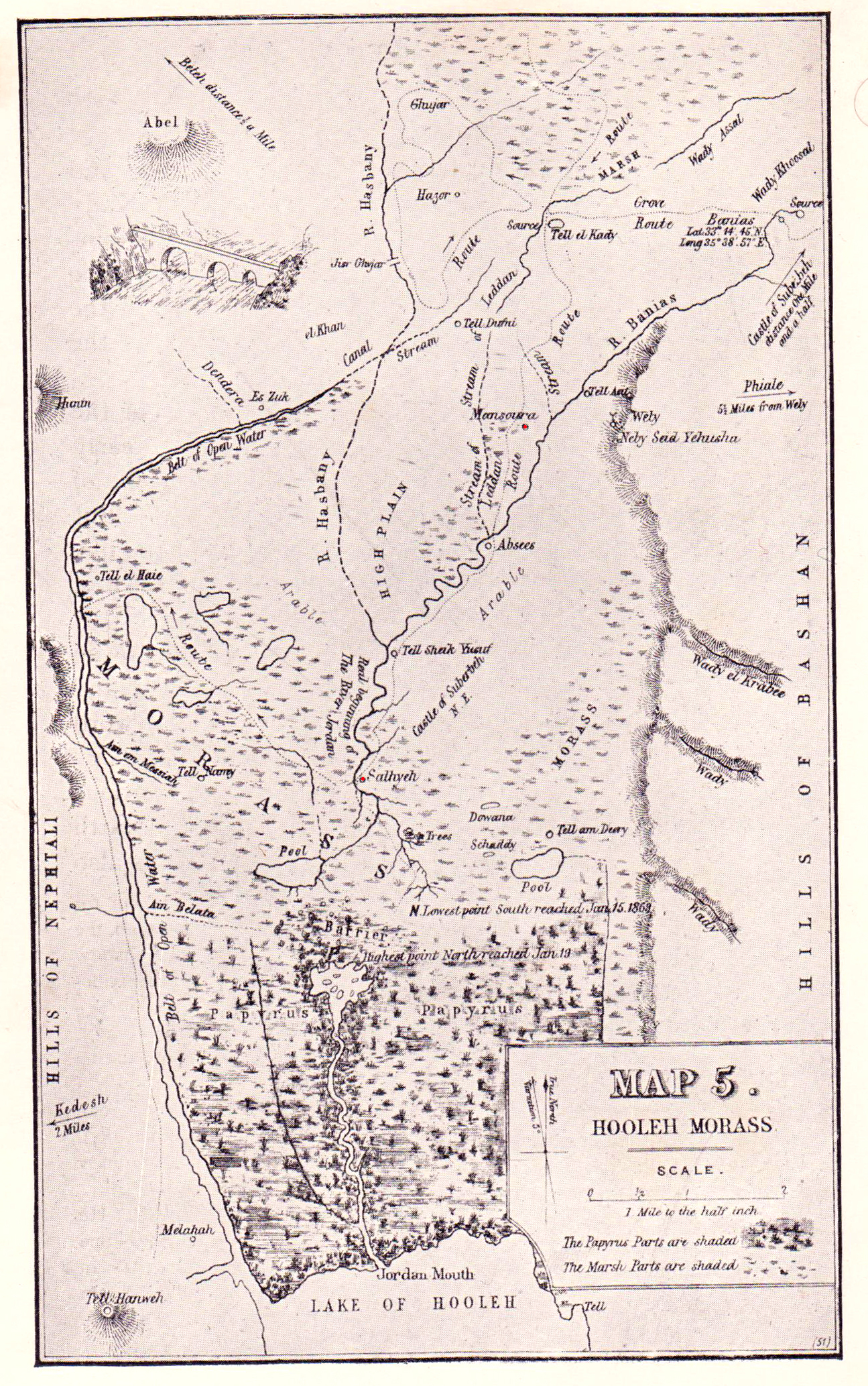
- Al-Mansura (Mansoura) marked on John MacGregor's map. January 1869.
- Etymology: Mansûr’s place
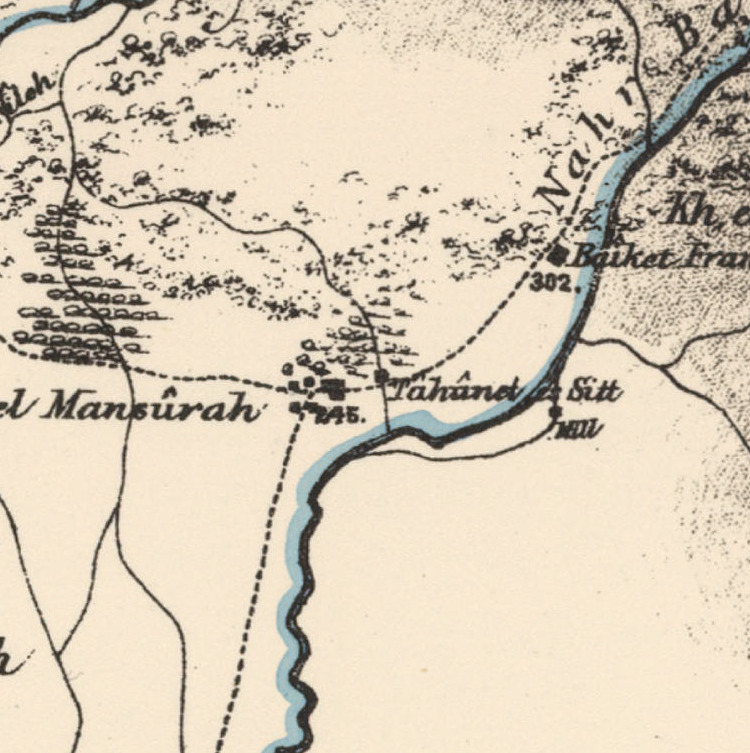
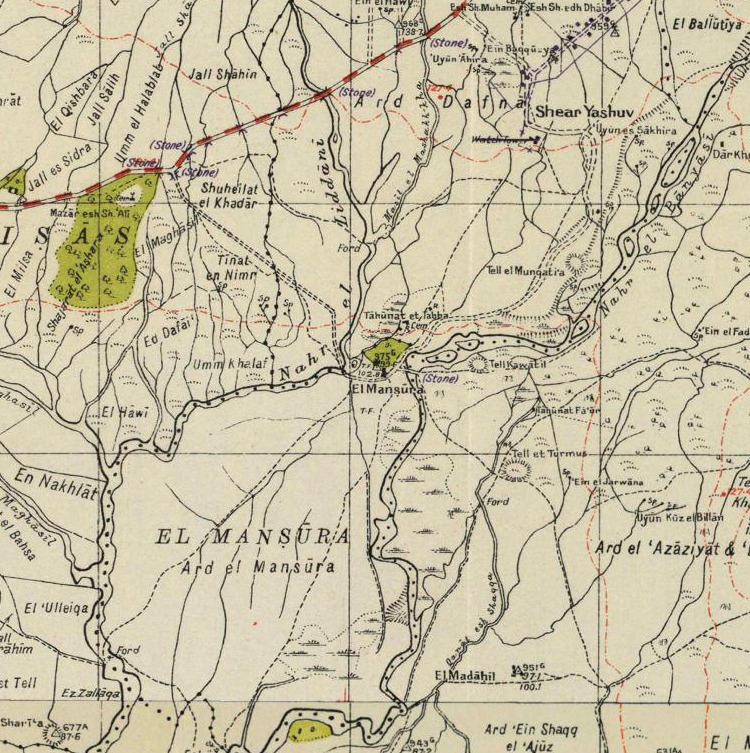
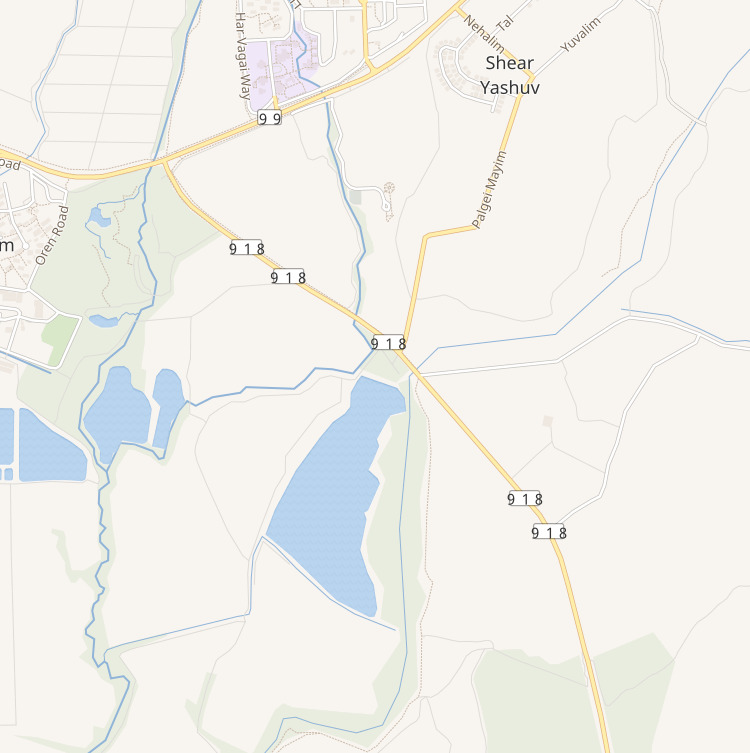
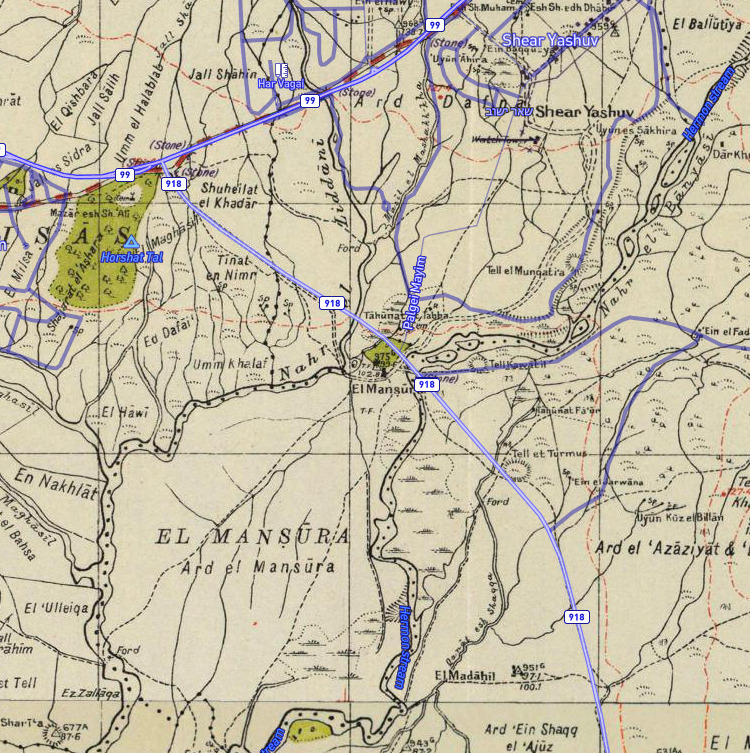
- 1870s map 1940s map modern map 1940s with modern overlay map A series of historical maps of the area around Al-Mansura, Safad (click the buttons)

- Location within Mandatory Palestine
- Coordinates: 33°12′59″N 35°38′26″E
- Palestine grid: 210/291
- Geopolitical entity: Mandatory Palestine
- Subdistrict: Safad
- Date of depopulation: May 25, 1948

Population (1945)
  - Total: 360
- Cause(s) of depopulation: Whispering campaign
- Nearby Localities: She'ar Yashuv

Al-Mansura (Arabic: المنصوره) was a Palestinian Arab village in the Safad Subdistrict. It was located 31 kilometres (19 mi) northeast of Safad on the Banyas River, to the south of what is now Dafna.

== History ==
=== Ottoman period ===
The Christian missionary W.M. Thomson, traveling during the Ottoman Empire period, in 1852, mentions a corn mill at Mansura and comments that the wider region depended on the area around Mansura for Indian corn, rice and sesamum. He saw hundreds of bee hives in Mansura. They were made from cylindrical baskets covered in mud and dung which were piled into a pyramid and covered with a thatched roof. As well as honey production the residents also exported buffalo butter from their large herds of water buffalo. He comments that the area had a large permanent population, the Ghawaraneh tribe, living in tents. He writes that he knows the names of over thirty permanent Arab encampments in the Huleh plain.

In January 1869 canoeing pioneer John MacGregor spent the night beside the village corn-mill. It was the only stone building in the area and had a flat roof. Other buildings he saw had mud walls with a reed roof or were completely made of reeds. There were also bedouin in tents. The miller was Christian and had arrived the year before following the killing of four of his children during the massacres further north. Besides milling corn he also sold gunpowder. As the MacGregor party, with his canoe on the back of a mule, approached Al-Mansura they met a procession celebrating the end of Ramadan, Eid al-Fitr. They were greeted with excitement because it was assumed they were entertainers travelling to the village to join in the celebrations. MacGregor commented that most of the men had tattoos or scars on their faces as well as ear and nose rings. The women's face were stained with blue patterns. "Their dress was the most various possible, long and short, coloured and plain, scanty and ample, of camel´s hair from Damascus, silk from Lebanon and Manchester cotton."

In 1881 the PEF's Survey of Western Palestine described the village as consisting "of stone and mud hovels on the plain, surrounded by arable land; river near; the village contains about seventy Moslems."

=== British Mandate of Palestine period ===
In the 1922 census of Palestine conducted by the British Mandate authorities, Mansura had an all-Muslim population of 41. This had increased in the 1931 census when El Mansura had an all-Muslim population of 89, in 18 houses.

In the 1945 statistics the population was 360, all Muslims, owning 1,254 dunams of land, while Jews owned 175 dunams, and 115 was publicly owned, according to an official land and population survey. Of this, 1,424 dunams were allocated for plantations and irrigable land, while 5 dunams were classified as built-up areas.

=== 1948, and after ===
The village was depopulated during the 1948 War on May 25, 1948, under Operation Yiftach.

The settlement She'ar Yashuv is located about 1 km northeast of the village site. In 1992 the village site was described as: "The village has been completely obliterated and it is difficult to identify any trace of its former buildings. The site has been converted into a fish hatchery and contain pools for this purpose. Between the pools there is a narrow strip of thorns and trees."

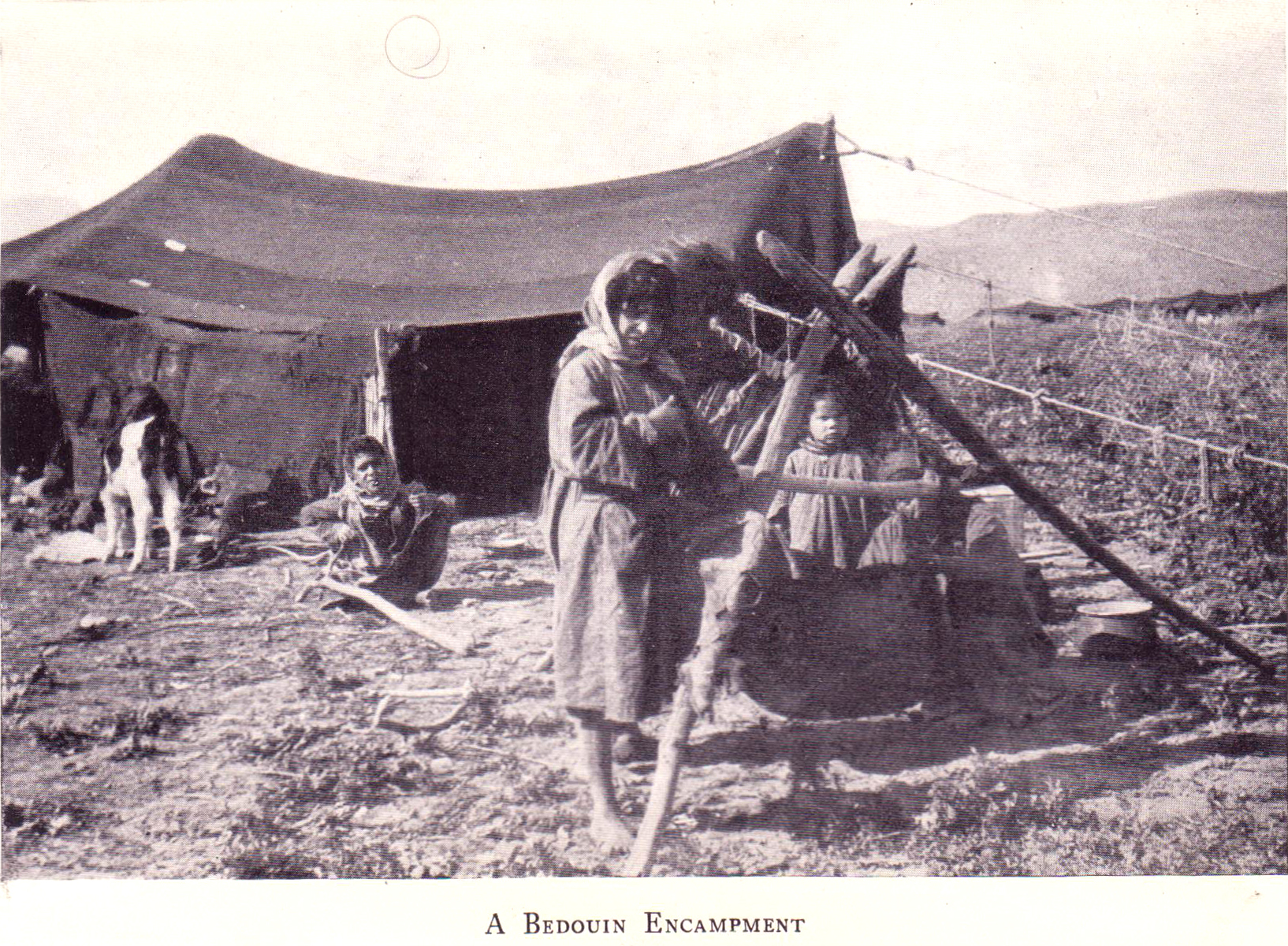
Hula Bedouin making buffalo butter in 1925, using the same methods as described by W.M. Thomson in 1857.

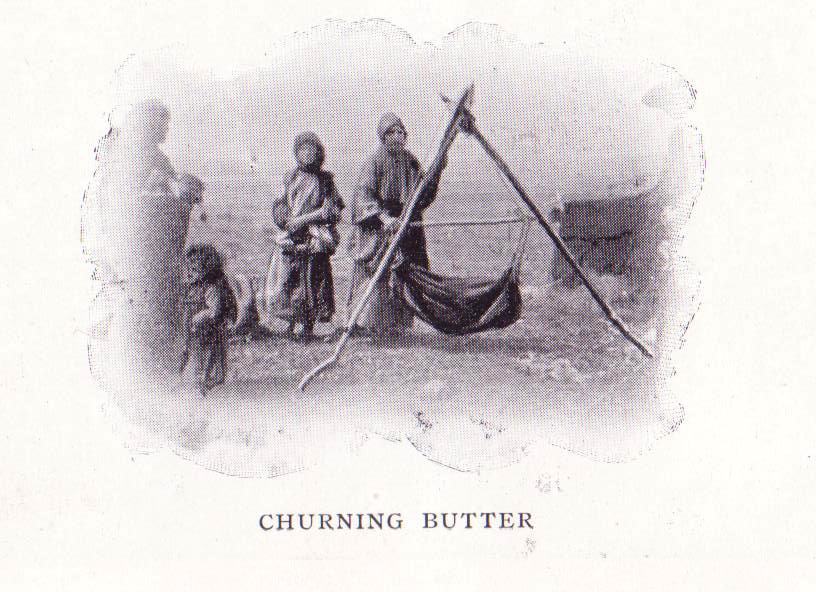
Churning butter, Palestine, 1904.

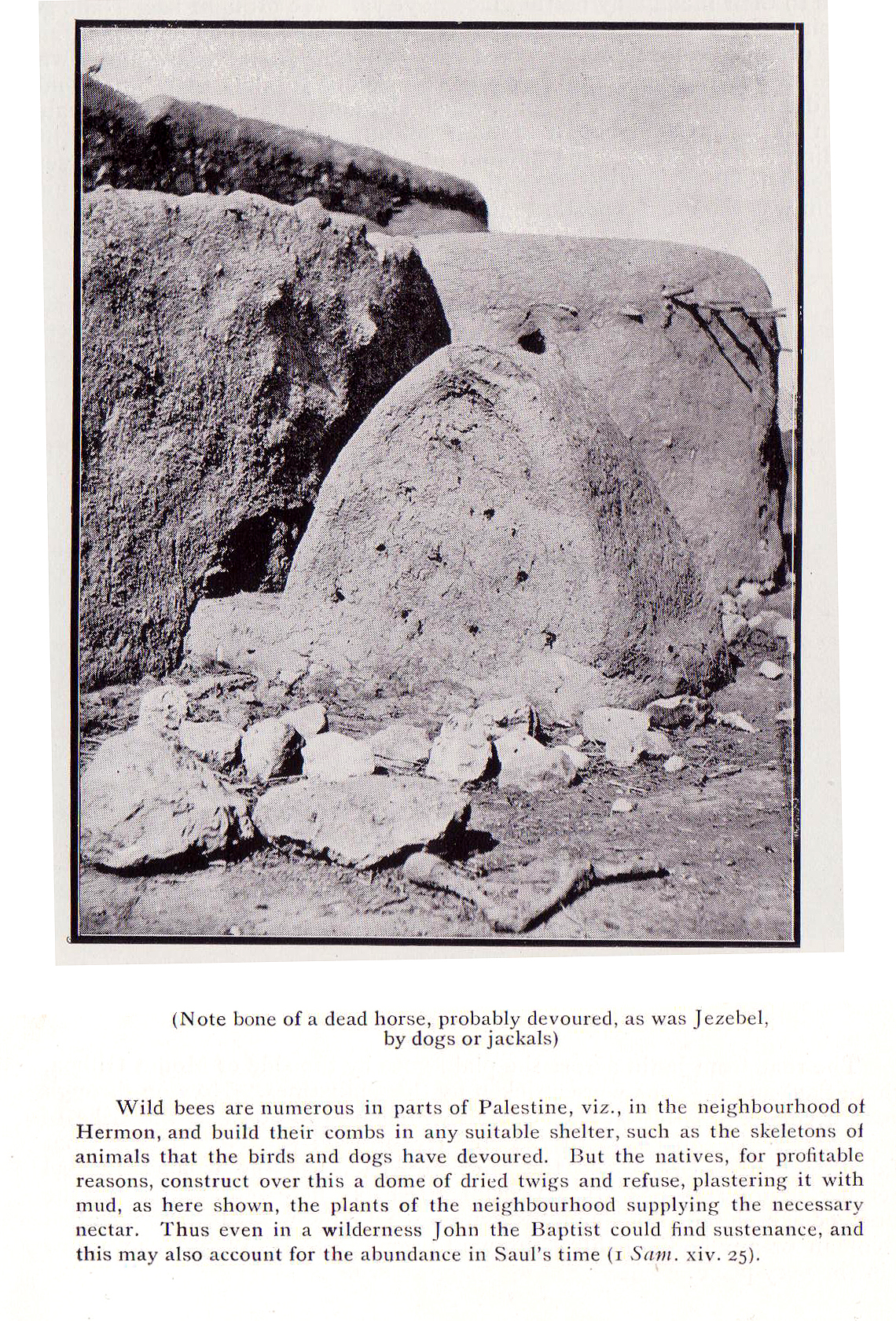
Hula beehive, 1904.

=== See also ===
- Mallaha
- Al-Salihiyya

== Bibliography ==
- Assis, Royee (2017-09-11). "She'ar Yashuv" (129). Hadashot Arkheologiyot – Excavations and Surveys in Israel.
- Barron, J.B., ed. (1923). Palestine: Report and General Abstracts of the Census of 1922. Government of Palestine.
- Conder, C.R.; Kitchener, H.H. (1881). The Survey of Western Palestine: Memoirs of the Topography, Orography, Hydrography, and Archaeology. Vol. 1. London: Committee of the Palestine Exploration Fund.
- Government of Palestine, Department of Statistics (1945). Village Statistics, April, 1945.
- Hadawi, S. (1970). Village Statistics of 1945: A Classification of Land and Area ownership in Palestine. Palestine Liberation Organization Research Center. Archived from the original on 2018-12-08.
- Khalidi, W. (1992). All That Remains: The Palestinian Villages Occupied and Depopulated by Israel in 1948. Washington D.C.: Institute for Palestine Studies. ISBN 0-88728-224-5.
- Macgregor, J. (1869). The Rob Roy on the Jordan: Nile, Red Sea, & Gennesareth, Etc. : a Canoe Cruise in Palestine and Egypt and the Waters of Damascus. London: John Murray.
- Mills, E., ed. (1932). Census of Palestine 1931. Population of Villages, Towns and Administrative Areas. Jerusalem: Government of Palestine.
- Morris, B. (2004). The Birth of the Palestinian Refugee Problem Revisited. Cambridge University Press. ISBN 978-0-521-00967-6.
- Palmer, E.H. (1881). The Survey of Western Palestine: Arabic and English Name Lists Collected During the Survey by Lieutenants Conder and Kitchener, R. E. Transliterated and Explained by E.H. Palmer. Committee of the Palestine Exploration Fund.
- Rajab, J. (1989). Palestinian Costume. Indiana University. ISBN 0-7141-2517-2.
- Thomson, W.M. (1859). The Land and the Book: Or, Biblical Illustrations Drawn from the Manners and Customs, the Scenes and Scenery, of the Holy Land. Vol. 1 (1 ed.). New York: Harper & Brothers.
