= Arab al-Zubayd =

Village in Safad subdistrict, Mandatory Palestine

Arab al-Zubayd عرب الزبيد 'Arab Zubeih
- Village
- Etymology: The Zubeid Arabs
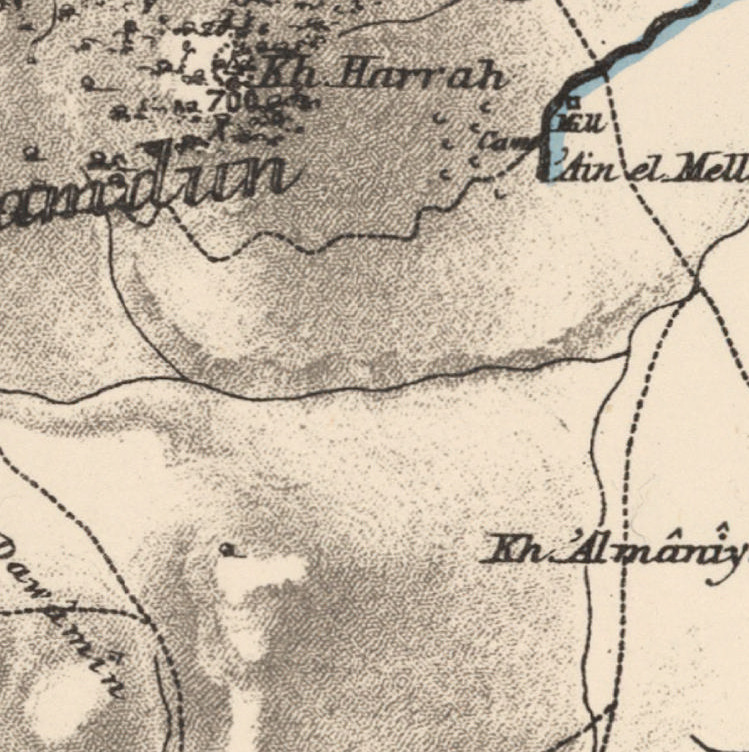
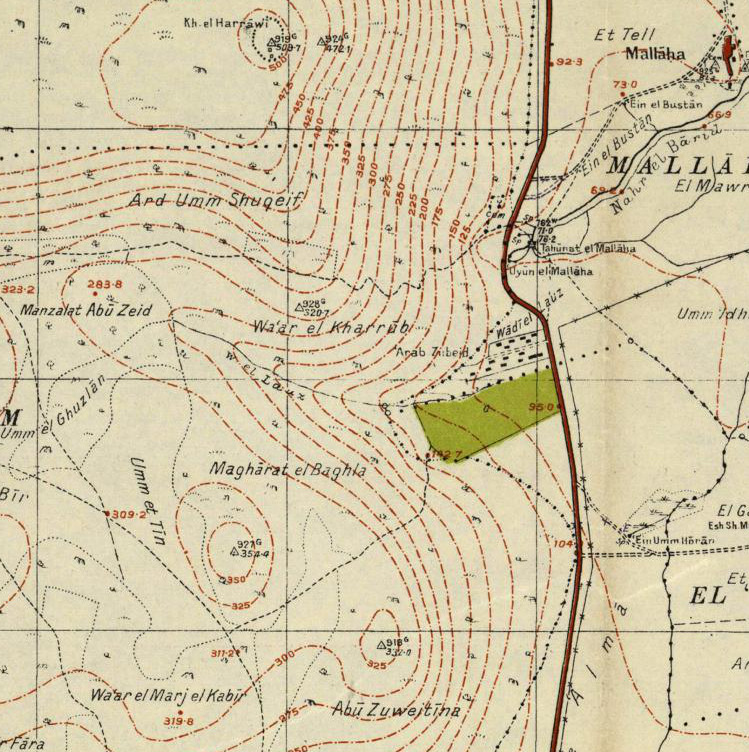
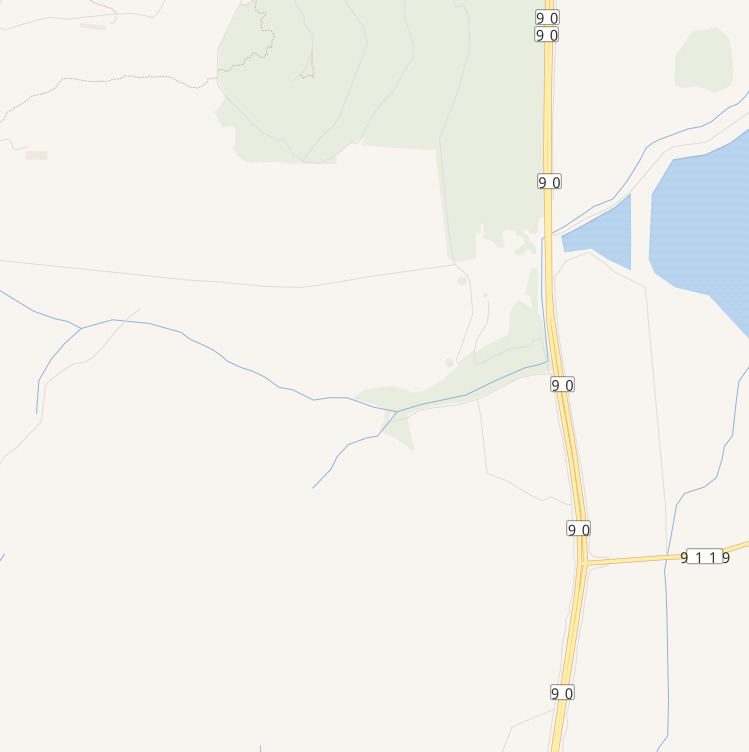
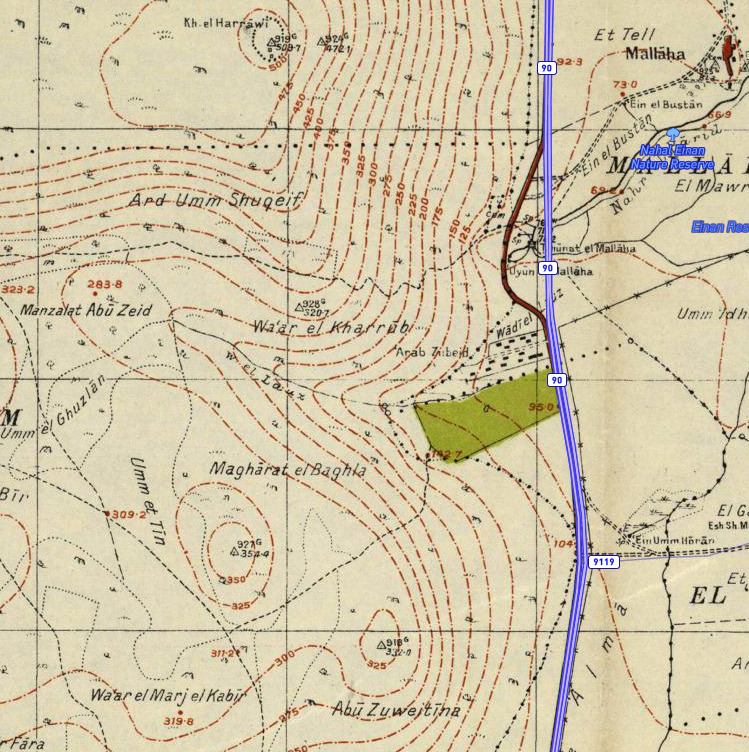
- 1870s map 1940s map modern map 1940s with modern overlay map A series of historical maps of the area around Arab al-Zubayd (click the buttons)

- Location within Mandatory Palestine
- Coordinates: 33°4′44″N 35°34′03″E
- Palestine grid: 203/276
- Geopolitical entity: Mandatory Palestine
- Subdistrict: Safad
- Date of depopulation: April 20, 1948

Population (1945)
  - Total: 890
- Cause(s) of depopulation: Fear of being caught up in the fighting

Arab al-Zubayd was a Palestinian village in the Safad Subdistrict. It was depopulated during the 1947–1948 Civil War in Mandatory Palestine on April 20, 1948, when the villagers fled on hearing the intentions of The Palmach's First Battalion of Operation Yiftach. It was located 15 km northeast of Safad, near the al-Mutilla-Safad—Tiberias highway.

== History ==
In 1838, in the Ottoman era, ez-Zubeid was described as an Arab tribe residing in the vicinity of Safad.

=== British Mandate era ===
In the 1922 census of Palestine conducted by the British Mandate authorities, Arab Zubaid had a population of 257; 255 Muslims and 2 Melkite Christians, increasing in the 1931 census, when it was counted together with Al-'Ulmaniyya, to 432; 5 Christians and 427 Muslims, in a total of 100 houses.

The population, combined with that of Mallaha, came to 890 Muslims in the 1945 statistics, with a total of 2,168 dunams of land.

The village relied on its abundant springs for farming. In 1944–45 a total of 1,761 dunums was allocated to cereal farming. while 20 dunams were classified as built-up land.

=== 1948 war and depopulation ===
According to Israeli historian Benny Morris, the villagers fled on 20 April (prior to the occupation of any neighboring villages), anticipating an Israeli attack. In August 1948, Golani Brigade units were preparing to blow up the village in spite of a complaint from the nearby Kibbutz Sha’ar ha-’Amaqim, which objected. Prime Minister David Ben-Gurion denied responsibility, saying: "No permission was given by me or to any commander to destroy houses." The village was nevertheless destroyed.

In 1992, Khalidi wrote that the area was strewn with rubble covered by a thicket of woods, grass, and thorny plants, and he saw animals grazing in the hills. Some land in the plain had been turned into a nature reserve and the rest cultivated by Israeli farmers."

== Bibliography ==
- Barron, J.B., ed. (1923). Palestine: Report and General Abstracts of the Census of 1922. Government of Palestine.
- Government of Palestine, Department of Statistics (1945). Village Statistics, April, 1945.
- Hadawi, S. (1970). Village Statistics of 1945: A Classification of Land and Area ownership in Palestine. Palestine Liberation Organization Research Center.
- Khalidi, W. (1992). All That Remains: The Palestinian Villages Occupied and Depopulated by Israel in 1948. Washington D.C.: Institute for Palestine Studies. ISBN 0-88728-224-5.
- Mills, E., ed. (1932). Census of Palestine 1931. Population of Villages, Towns and Administrative Areas. Jerusalem: Government of Palestine.
- Morris, B. (2004). The Birth of the Palestinian Refugee Problem Revisited. Cambridge University Press. ISBN 978-0-521-00967-6.
- Palmer, E.H. (1881). The Survey of Western Palestine: Arabic and English Name Lists Collected During the Survey by Lieutenants Conder and Kitchener, R. E. Transliterated and Explained by E.H. Palmer. Committee of the Palestine Exploration Fund.
- Robinson, E.; Smith, E. (1841). Biblical Researches in Palestine, Mount Sinai and Arabia Petraea: A Journal of Travels in the year 1838. Vol. 3. Boston: Crocker & Brewster.
