= Mallaha =

Mallaha ملاّحة
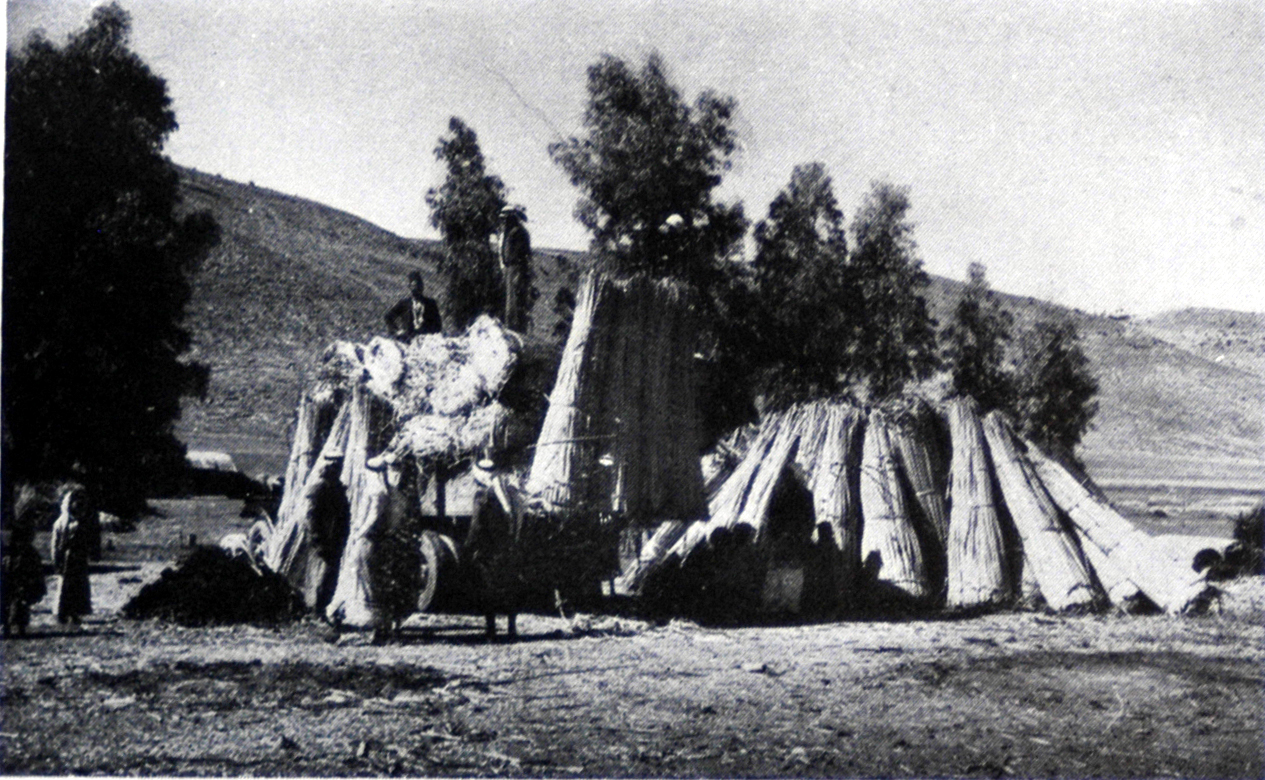
- Bundles of dried papyrus being loaded onto a lorry. Mallaha, circa 1936.
- Etymology: "the salty site"
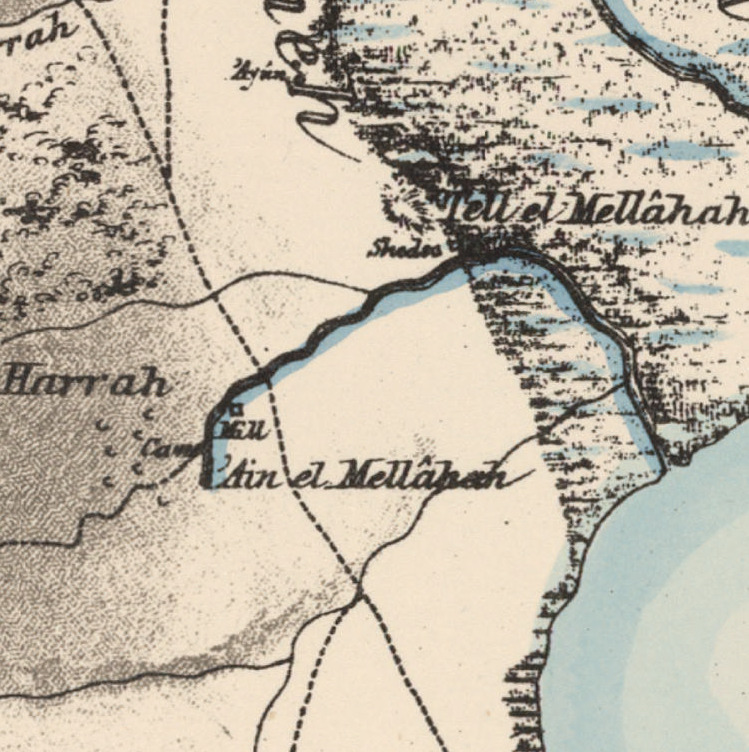
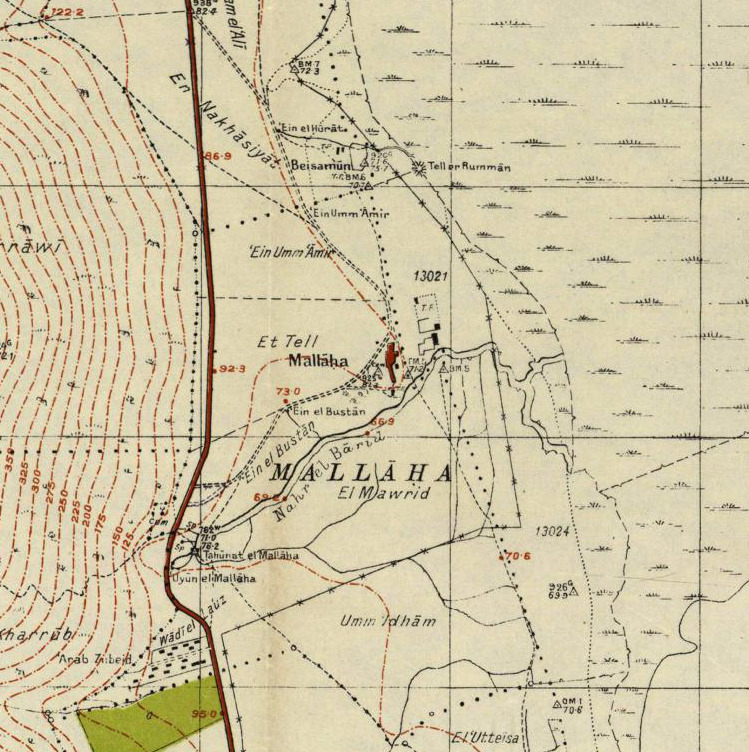
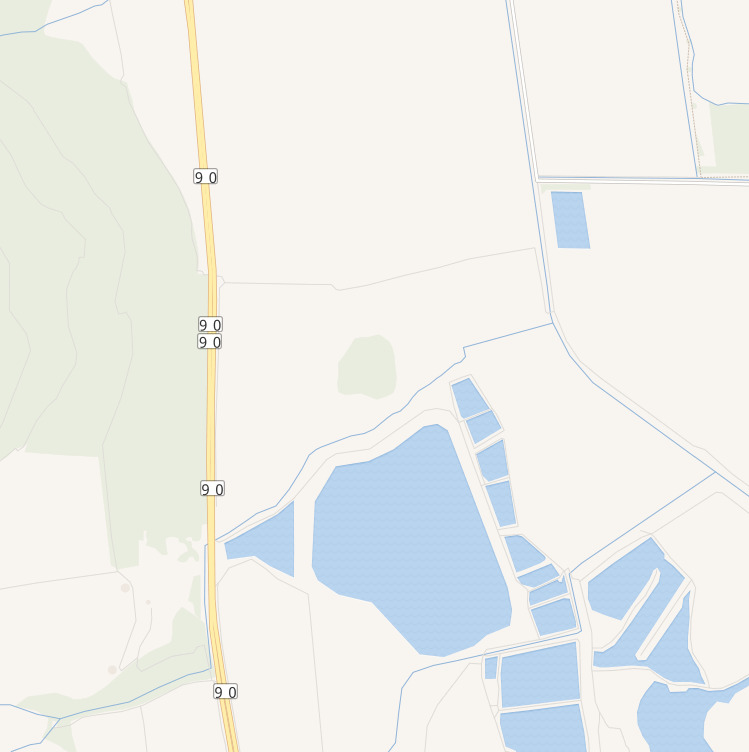
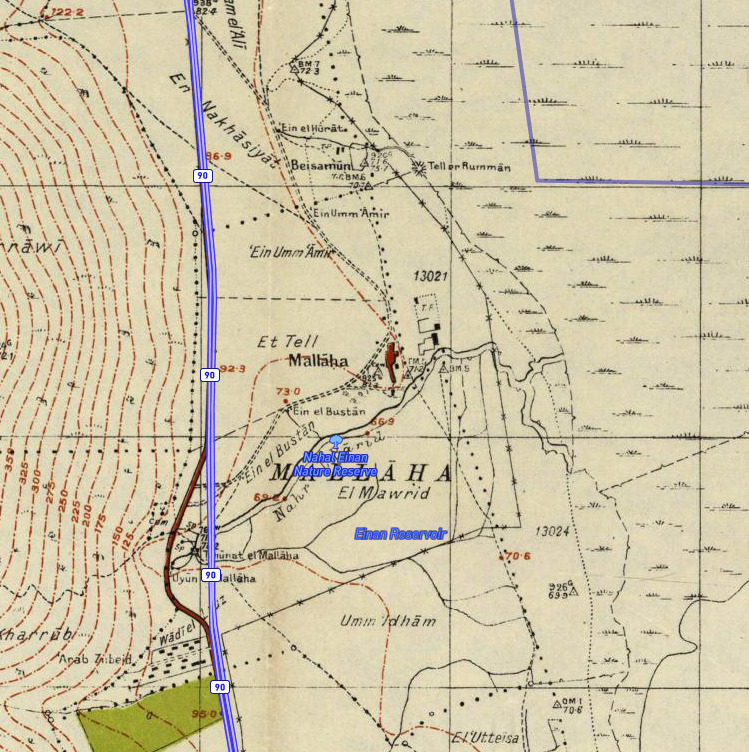
- 1870s map 1940s map modern map 1940s with modern overlay map A series of historical maps of the area around Mallaha (click the buttons)

- Location within Mandatory Palestine
- Coordinates: 33°05′24″N 35°34′55″E
- Palestine grid: 204/277
- Geopolitical entity: Mandatory Palestine
- Subdistrict: Safad
- Date of depopulation: 25 May 1948

Area
  - Total: 2,168 dunams (2.168 km^{2}; 0.837 sq mi)

Population (1931)
  - Total: 654
- Cause(s) of depopulation: Whispering campaign

Mallaha (Arabic: ملاّحة) was a Palestinian Arab village, located 16 kilometers (9.9 mi) northeast of Safed, on the highway between the latter and Tiberias. 'Ain Mallaha is the local Arabic name for a spring that served as the water source for the village inhabitants throughout the ages. It is also one of the names used in English to refer to the ancient Natufian era settlement at the site.

== History ==
=== Prehistory ===
Evidence of settlement at Mallaha (or 'Ain Mallaha) dates back to the Mesolithic period circa 10,000 BCE. The first permanent village settlement of pre-agricultural times in Palestine, Kathleen Kenyon describes the material remains found there as Natufian, consisting of 50 circular, semi-subterranean, one-room huts, paved with flat slabs and surrounded by stone walls up to 1.2 meters (3.9 ft) high. The floors and walls of the homes were decorated in solid white or red, a simple and popular decorative motif in the Near East at the time. The inhabitants appear to have subsisted on fish from nearby Lake Hula, as well as by hunting and gathering; no evidence of animal domestication or cultivation has been found, with the exception of dogs: the burial of a human being with a domestic dog at the site represents the earliest known archaeological evidence of dog domestication.

=== Crusader period ===
During the Crusader era, the Franks referred to Mallaha as Merla. Ibn al-Qalanisi describes a battle that took place at Mallaha in June 1157 between the Arab and Turkish forces of Nur ad-Din Zangi and those of the Crusaders under King Baldwin III. Qalanisi writes that Nur ad-Din sent his troops to Mallaha immediately after learning via pigeon post that the Franks had set up an encampment there. The battle, as described by Qalanisi, was bloody and quick, resulting in decisive victory for the Muslim forces, who are reported to have lost only two men, with the king narrowly escaping with a bodyguard. The battles for control over Mallaha continued. The Itinerary of Richard I notes that the army had advanced to Merla, "where the king had spent one of the previous nights."

=== Mamluk period ===
Just SE of Mallaha (at grid 2071/2737), excavations have revealed structures, probably dating to thirteenth or fourteenth century, that is after the area fell to Mamluk sultan Baybars. The structures have been assumed to belong to a sugar-producing installation.

=== Ottoman period ===
Mallaha, like most of Palestine, was incorporated into the Ottoman Empire in the early sixteenth century. Sufi traveller al-Bakri al-Siddiqi passed by the village in the mid-eighteenth century.

Johann Ludwig Burckhardt travelled in the region during the start of the nineteenth century, but according to Edward Robinson, who travelled there in 1838, Burckhardt mislabeled the whole S.W. coast of the lake as el-Mellahah. Robinson observed that Ain el-Mallaha lay northwest of Lake Hula, and was "a single large fountain." Nearby was "usually a large encampment of the Ghawarineh in tents and reed huts."

In 1881, the PEF's Survey of Western Palestine (SWP) described Ain el Mellahah as a "very large perennial spring, flowing in a long stream from the base of the mountain; at once turns a mill, and forms almost a small river."

=== British Mandate ===
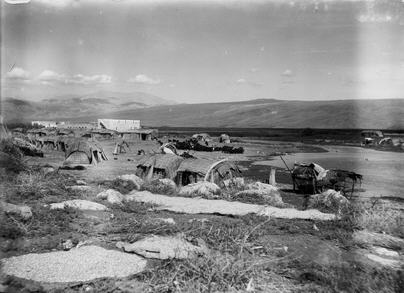
Mallaha 1926

During the British Mandate, Mallaha had a roughly rectangular configuration that stretched from north to south, and its residents predominately sustained themselves through agriculture. In the 1922 census of Palestine, Mallaha had a population of 440 residents, all Muslim. By the 1931 census, the population increased to 654 residents across 161 households.

The population, combined with that of 'Arab al-Zubayd, came to 890 Muslims in the 1945 statistics, with a total of 2,168 dunams of land. In 1944/45 a total of 1,761 dunums were used for cereals by the villagers, while 20 dunams were classifies as built-up land.

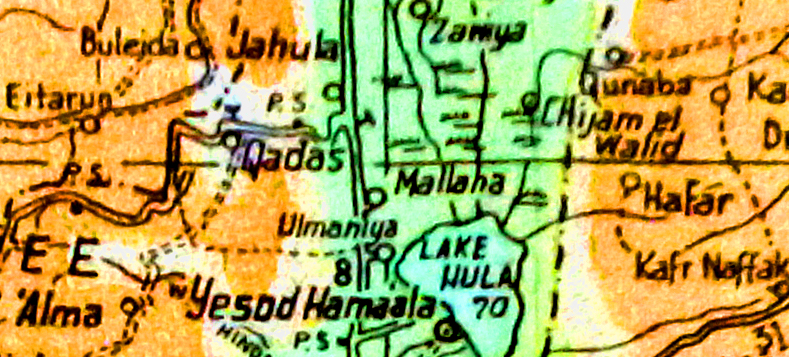
Mallaha, 1946

=== 1948 and after ===
On 25 May 1948 the villagers left their homes on the advice of their Jewish neighbours. This was part of a "whispering campaign" launched by the Haganah following Operation Yiftach.

According to the Palestinian historian Walid Khalidi, describing the remains of the village in 1992: "The sandy hill on which the village was situated is completely overgrown with tall grass, cactuses, and weeds, as well as an assortment of fig, eucalyptus, and date-palm trees. Amidst the overgrowth, stone rubble from destroyed houses can be seen. The surrounding land is cultivated by the settlement of Yesud ha-Ma'ala.

A village history was published in Damascus in 2005. According to a commentator on Palestinian village history, Rochelle A. Davis, this history is especially notable due to the prominent role women are given in describing village life. Davis believes this might be because the villagers belonged to the Ghawarneh group, where women traditionally took more prominent roles.

== See also ==
- Depopulated Palestinian locations in Israel
- Al-Mansura
- Al-Salihiyya

== Bibliography ==
- 'Abd al-'Aal, Yusif 'Ali (2005). Judhur wa furu' Filastiniyya min al-Mallaha [Palestinian roots and branches from Mallala]. Damascus, Syria: Dar al-Umma lil-Tiba' wal-Nashr wal-Tawzi'.
- Barron, J.B., ed. (1923). Palestine: Report and General Abstracts of the Census of 1922. Government of Palestine.
- Burckhardt, J.L. (1822). Travels in Syria and the Holy Land. J. Murray.
- Conder, C.R.; Kitchener, H.H. (1881). The Survey of Western Palestine: Memoirs of the Topography, Orography, Hydrography, and Archaeology. Vol. 1. London: Committee of the Palestine Exploration Fund.
- Davis, Rochelle A. (2011). Palestinian Village Histories: Geographies of the Displaced. Stanford University Press, Stanford, California. ISBN 978-0-8047-7312-6.
- Edwards, I.E.S.; Gadd, Cyril John; Hammond, N.G.L.; Boardman, J. (2009). The Cambridge Ancient History: Prolegomena and Prehistory, Vol 1/Part 1. Cambridge University Press. ISBN 978-0-521-07051-5.
- Gabrieli, F. (2009). Arab Historians of the Crusades. Routledge. ISBN 978-1135176075.
- Government of Palestine, Department of Statistics (1945). Village Statistics, April, 1945.
- Hadawi, S. (1970). Village Statistics of 1945: A Classification of Land and Area ownership in Palestine. Palestine Liberation Organization Research Center. Archived from the original on 2018-12-08.
- Kenyon, K. (1985). Archaeology in the Holy Land. Taylor & Francis. ISBN 0-416-36490-X.
- Khalidi, W. (1992). All That Remains:The Palestinian Villages Occupied and Depopulated by Israel in 1948. Washington D.C.: Institute for Palestine Studies. ISBN 0-88728-224-5.
- Kipfer, B.A. (2013). Encyclopedic Dictionary of Archaeology. Springer. ISBN 978-1475751338.
- Lyons, Malcolm Cameron; Jackson, David Edward Pritchett (1984). Saladin: The Politics of the Holy War. Cambridge University Press. ISBN 0-521-31739-8.
- Mills, E., ed. (1932). Census of Palestine 1931. Population of Villages, Towns and Administrative Areas. Jerusalem: Government of Palestine.
- Morris, B. (1987). The Birth of the Palestinian refugee problem, 1947-1949. Cambridge University Press. ISBN 0-521-33028-9.
- Morris, B. (2004). The Birth of the Palestinian Refugee Problem Revisited. Cambridge University Press. ISBN 0-521-00967-7.
- Palmer, E.H. (1881). The Survey of Western Palestine: Arabic and English Name Lists Collected During the Survey by Lieutenants Conder and Kitchener, R. E. Transliterated and Explained by E.H. Palmer. Committee of the Palestine Exploration Fund.
- Pringle, D. (1997). Secular buildings in the Crusader Kingdom of Jerusalem: an archaeological Gazetter. Cambridge University Press. ISBN 0521-46010-7.
- Robinson, E.; Smith, E. (1841). Biblical Researches in Palestine, Mount Sinai and Arabia Petraea: A Journal of Travels in the year 1838. Vol. 3. Boston: Crocker & Brewster.
- Schmandt-Besserat, D. (2009). When Writing Met Art: From Symbol to Story. University of Texas Press. ISBN 978-0292774872.
