= An Inland Voyage =

Book by Robert Louis Stevenson

- Author: Robert Louis Stevenson
- Language: English
- Publisher: C. Kegan Paul & Co
- Publication date: 1878
- OCLC: 830757
- LC Class: PR5488 .I6

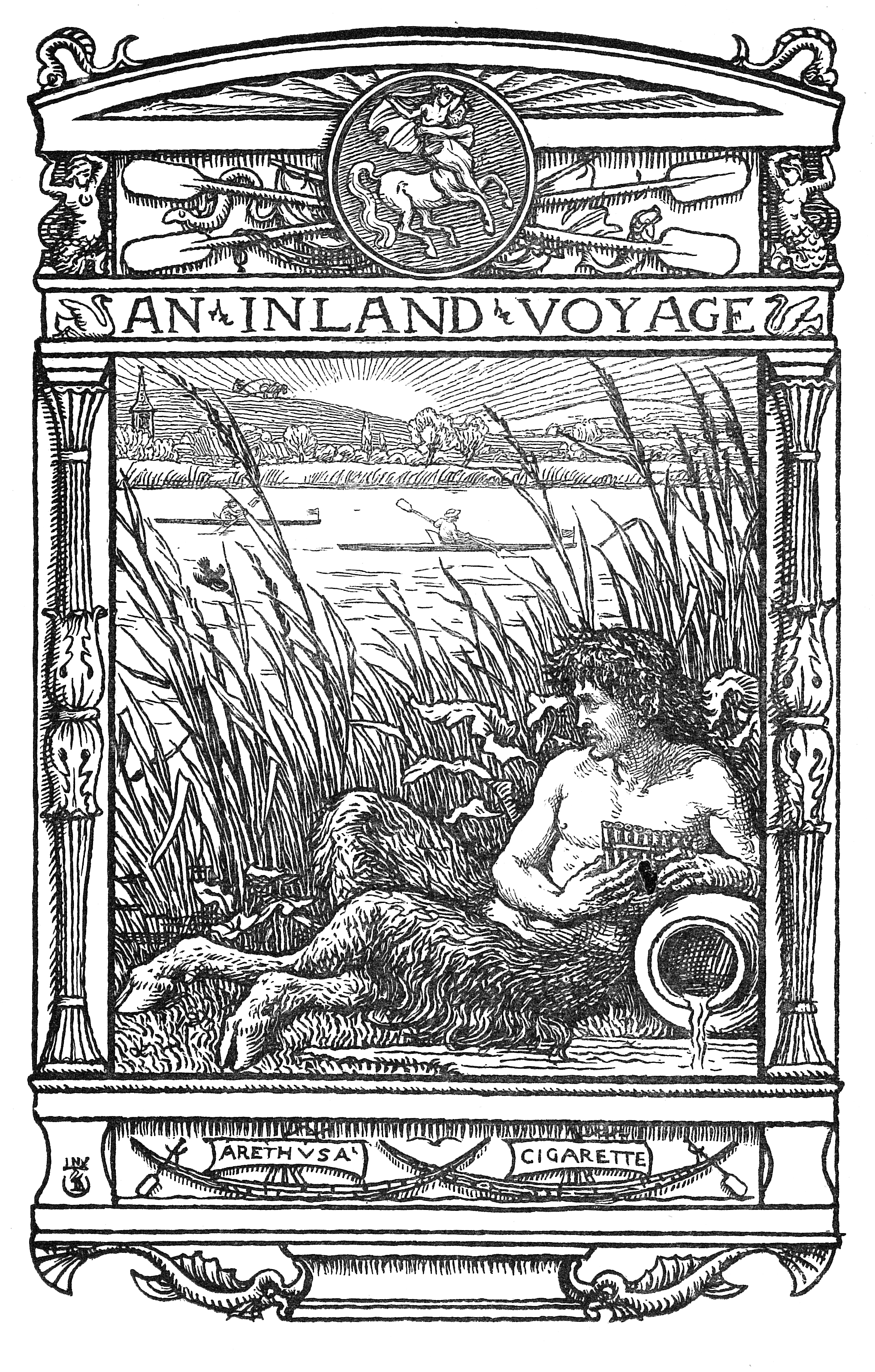
Frontispiece by Walter Crane, of the first edition, 1878

Canal barges in Belgium. Frontispiece by J. B. Carrington 1878 (see "External links" for more images from the book)

An Inland Voyage (1878) is a travelogue by Robert Louis Stevenson about a canoeing trip through France and Belgium in 1876. It is Stevenson's earliest book and a pioneering work of outdoor literature.

As a young man, Stevenson desired to be financially independent so that he might pursue the woman he loved, and set about funding his freedom from parental support by writing travelogues, the three most prominent being An Inland Voyage, Travels with a Donkey in the Cévennes (1879) and The Silverado Squatters (1883).

Voyage was undertaken with Stevenson's Scottish friend Sir Walter Grindlay Simpson, mostly along the Oise River from Belgium through France, in the Fall of 1876 when Stevenson was 26 years old. The first part, in Belgium, passed through heavily industrial areas and many canal locks, proving to be not much of a vacation. They then went by rail to France, starting downriver at Maubeuge and ending at Pontoise, close to the Seine. The route itinerary has become a popular route for modern travelers to re-enact with guidebooks and maps available.

Stevenson (named "Arethusa" in the book after his canoe) and Simpson (called "Cigarette" along with his canoe) each had a wooden canoe rigged with a sail, comparable in style to a modern kayak, known as a "Rob Roy". They were narrow, decked, and paddled with double-bladed paddles, a style that had recently become popular in England, France, and neighboring countries, inspired by Scottish explorer John MacGregor's book A Thousand Miles in the Rob Roy Canoe (1866).

Outdoor travel for leisure was considered unusual for the time, and the two Scotsmen were often mistaken for lowly traveling salesman (a status that more than once kept them from a room for the night), but the novelty of their canoes would occasionally convince entire villages to come out and wave along the banks with cheers of "come back soon!" A fundamentally Romantic work in style and tone, the book paints the atmosphere of Europe in a more innocent light, with quirky innkeepers, traveling entertainers and puppeteers, old men who had never left their villages, ramshackle military units parading with drums and swords, and gypsy-like families who lived on canal barges.

The first edition was published by C. Kegan Paul & Co. Since then there have been several editions; a later edition adds an adventure on foot in which Stevenson is thought to be a beggar and is tossed in jail by police, and also a preface by Stevenson's future wife Fanny Vandegrift Osbourne and stepson Lloyd Osbourne, who met him on this journey.
