= Al-'Ulmaniyya =

Al-'Ulmaniyya العلمانية 'Ulmaniya, al
- Village
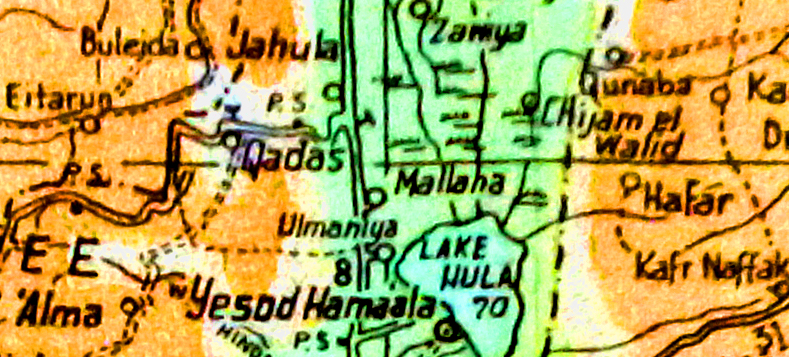
- Al-'Ulmaniyya 1946
- Etymology: Kh. ’Almânîyeh, the ruin of ’Almânîyeh
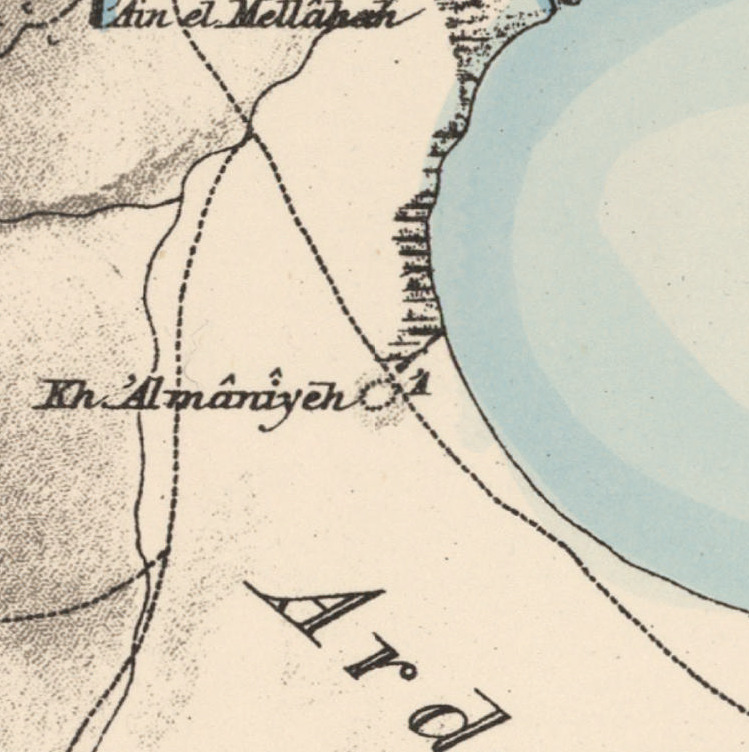
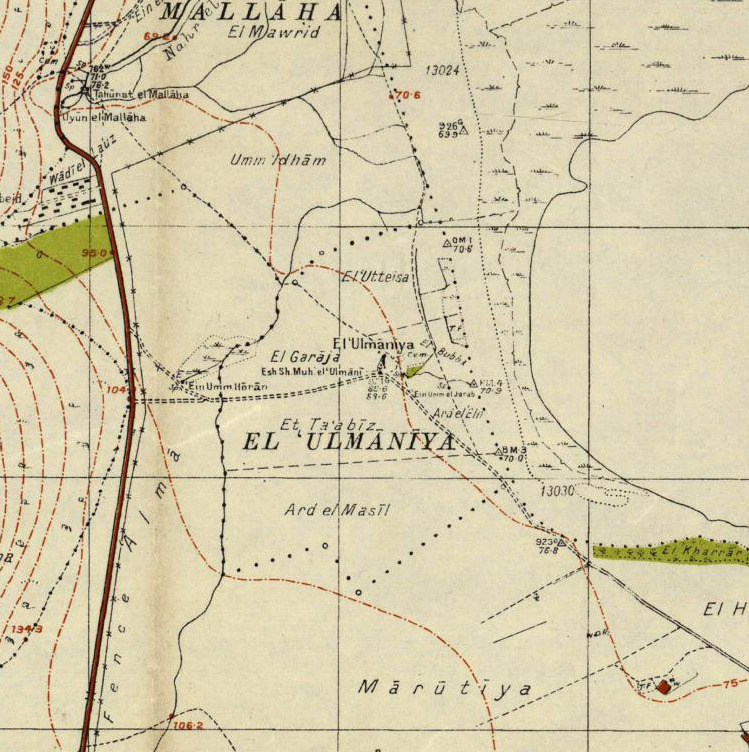
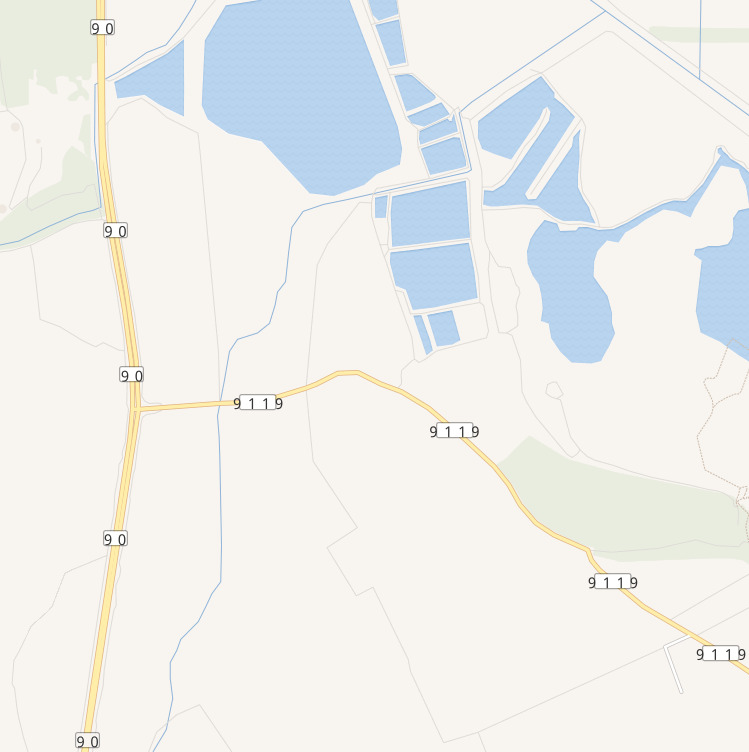
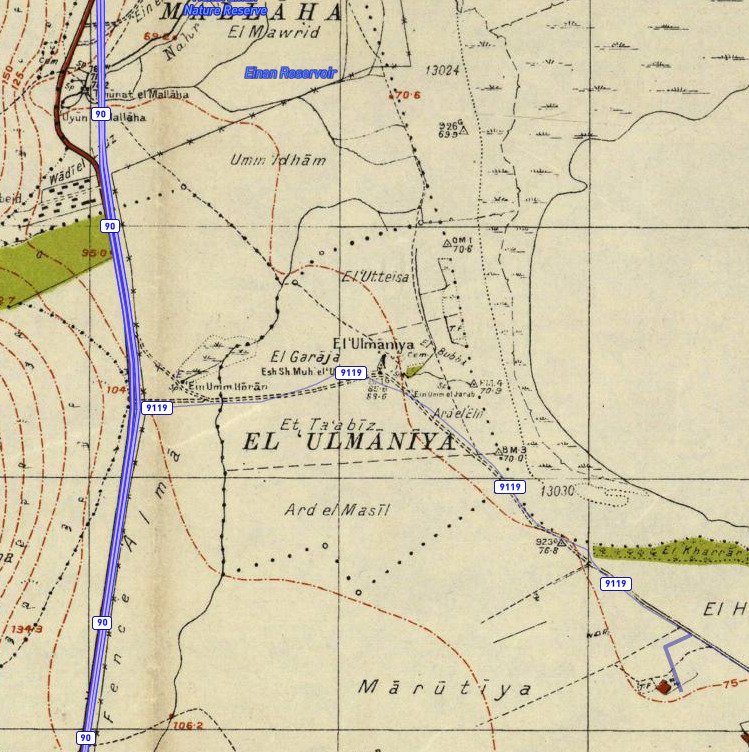
- 1870s map 1940s map modern map 1940s with modern overlay map A series of historical maps of the area around Al-'Ulmaniyya (click the buttons)

- Location within Mandatory Palestine
- Coordinates: 33°04′24″N 35°35′12″E
- Palestine grid: 205/275
- Geopolitical entity: Mandatory Palestine
- Subdistrict: Safad
- Date of depopulation: April 20, 1948

Area
  - Total: 1,169 dunams (1.169 km^{2}; 0.451 sq mi)

Population (1945)
  - Total: 260
- Cause(s) of depopulation: Military assault by Yishuv forces

Al-'Ulmaniyya was a Palestinian Arab village in the Safad Subdistrict. It was depopulated during the 1947–1948 Civil War in Mandatory Palestine on April 20, 1948, by the Palmach's First Battalion of Operation Yiftach. It was located 14.5 km northeast of Safad.

== History ==
In 1596 it appeared in the Ottoman tax registers, as being in the nahiyah ("subdistrict") of Jira, part of the Liwa ("district") of Safad. It had a population of 8 Households and 2 bachelors; an estimated 55 persons, all Muslim. They paid a fixed tax-rate of 25% on agricultural products, including wheat, barley, vegetable and fruit garden, orchards, goats and beehives, in addition to occasional revenues and water buffaloes; a total of 2,559 Akçe. All of the revenue went to a Waqf.

In 1881, the PEF's Survey of Western Palestine noted at Kh. Almaniyeh: "A few cattle-sheds and traces of ruins".

=== British Mandate era ===
In the 1922 census of Palestine conducted by the British Mandate authorities, 'Almaniyeh had a population of 122 Muslims, increasing in the 1931 census, when it was counted together with Zubeid, to 432; 5 Christians and 427 Muslims, in a total of 100 houses.

In the 1945 statistics the village had a population of 260 Muslims with 1,169 dunams of land. Of this, 1,135 dunams were used for cereals, while the built-up areas of the village amounted to 9 dunams.

== 1948, aftermath ==
Al-'Ulmaniyya became depopulated on April 20, 1948, after a military assault by Yishuv forces.

Yesud ha-Ma’ala is 2.5 km southeast of the village site.

In 1992 the village site was described: "The site is thickly wooded with eucalyptus trees, making it difficult to discern any remains of the village. Work is proceeding on street construction for Lake al-Hula's nature preservation area. Some of the surrounding lands are cultivated, but most have either been made part of the preservation area or are marshland."

== Bibliography ==
- Barron, J. B., ed. (1923). Palestine: Report and General Abstracts of the Census of 1922. Government of Palestine.
- Conder, C.R.; Kitchener, H.H. (1881). The Survey of Western Palestine: Memoirs of the Topography, Orography, Hydrography, and Archaeology. Vol. 1. London: Committee of the Palestine Exploration Fund.
- Department of Statistics (1945). Village Statistics, April, 1945. Government of Palestine.
- Hadawi, S. (1970). Village Statistics of 1945: A Classification of Land and Area ownership in Palestine. Palestine Liberation Organization Research Centre. Archived from the original on 2018-12-08.
- Hütteroth, W.-D.; Abdulfattah, K. (1977). Historical Geography of Palestine, Transjordan and Southern Syria in the Late 16th Century. Erlanger Geographische Arbeiten, Sonderband 5. Erlangen, Germany: Vorstand der Fränkischen Geographischen Gesellschaft. ISBN 3-920405-41-2.
- Khalidi, W. (1992). All That Remains:The Palestinian Villages Occupied and Depopulated by Israel in 1948. Washington D.C.: Institute for Palestine Studies. ISBN 0-88728-224-5.
- Mills, E., ed. (1932). Census of Palestine 1931. Population of Villages, Towns and Administrative Areas. Jerusalem: Government of Palestine.
- Morris, B. (2004). The Birth of the Palestinian Refugee Problem Revisited. Cambridge University Press. ISBN 978-0-521-00967-6.
- Palmer, E.H. (1881). The Survey of Western Palestine: Arabic and English Name Lists Collected During the Survey by Lieutenants Conder and Kitchener, R. E. Transliterated and Explained by E.H. Palmer. Committee of the Palestine Exploration Fund.
- Rhode, H. (1979). Administration and Population of the Sancak of Safed in the Sixteenth Century. Columbia University. Archived from the original on 2020-03-01.
