= Kfar Blum =

Kibbutz in northern Israel

Kfar Blum: כפר בלום (Hebrew)
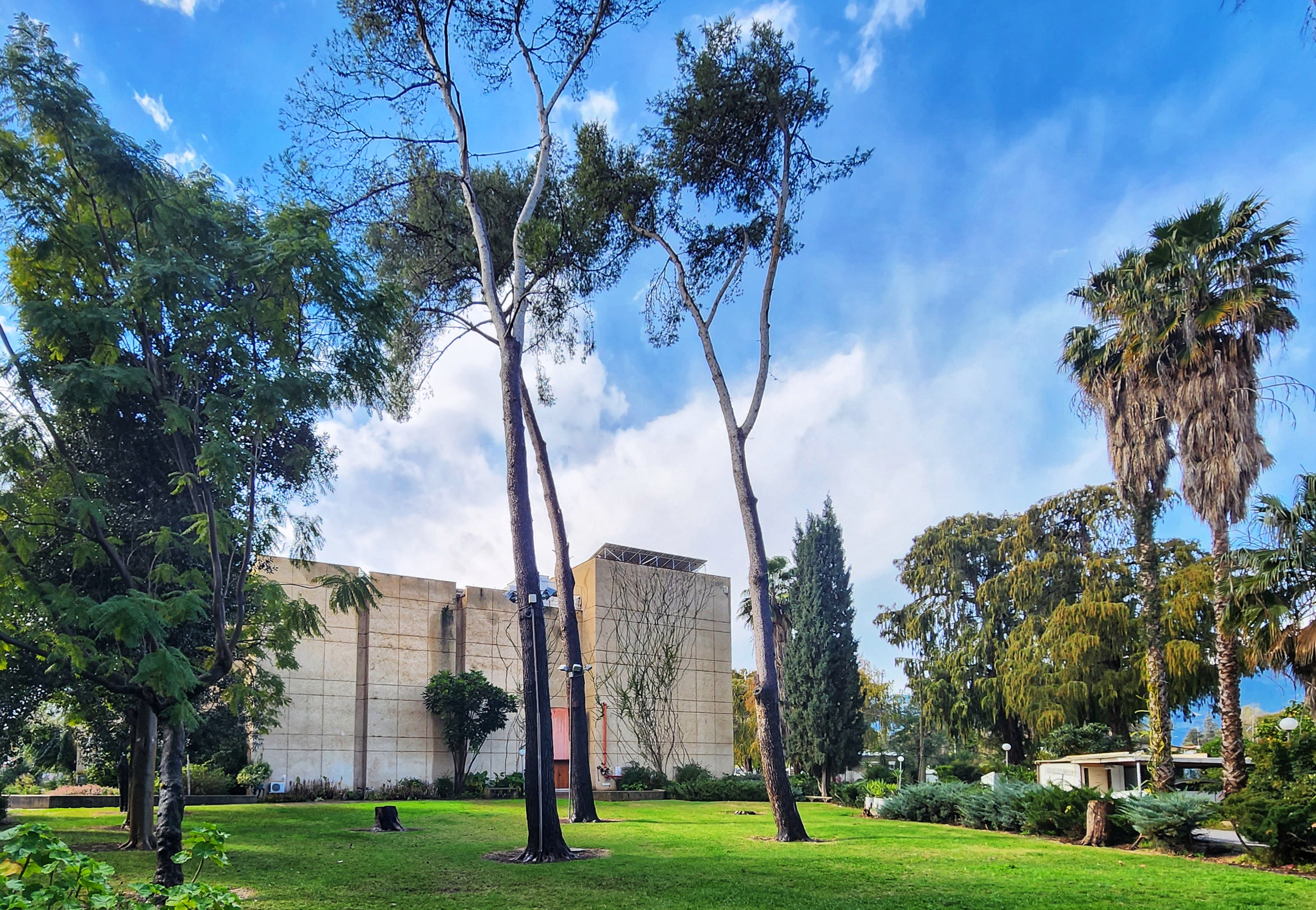

- Location within Northeast Israel
- Coordinates: 33°10′20″N 35°36′35″E
- Country: Israel
- District: Northern
- Subdistrict: Safed
- Council: Upper Galilee
- Affiliation: Kibbutz Movement
- Founded: November 1943
- Founder: Habonim members
- Population (2024): 928

Kfar Blum (Hebrew: כפר בלום, lit. 'Blum Village') is a kibbutz in the Hula Valley part of the Upper Galilee in Israel. Located about 6 km (4 mi) southeast of the town of Kiryat Shmona, it falls under the jurisdiction of Upper Galilee Regional Council. In 2024 it had a population of 928.

== History ==
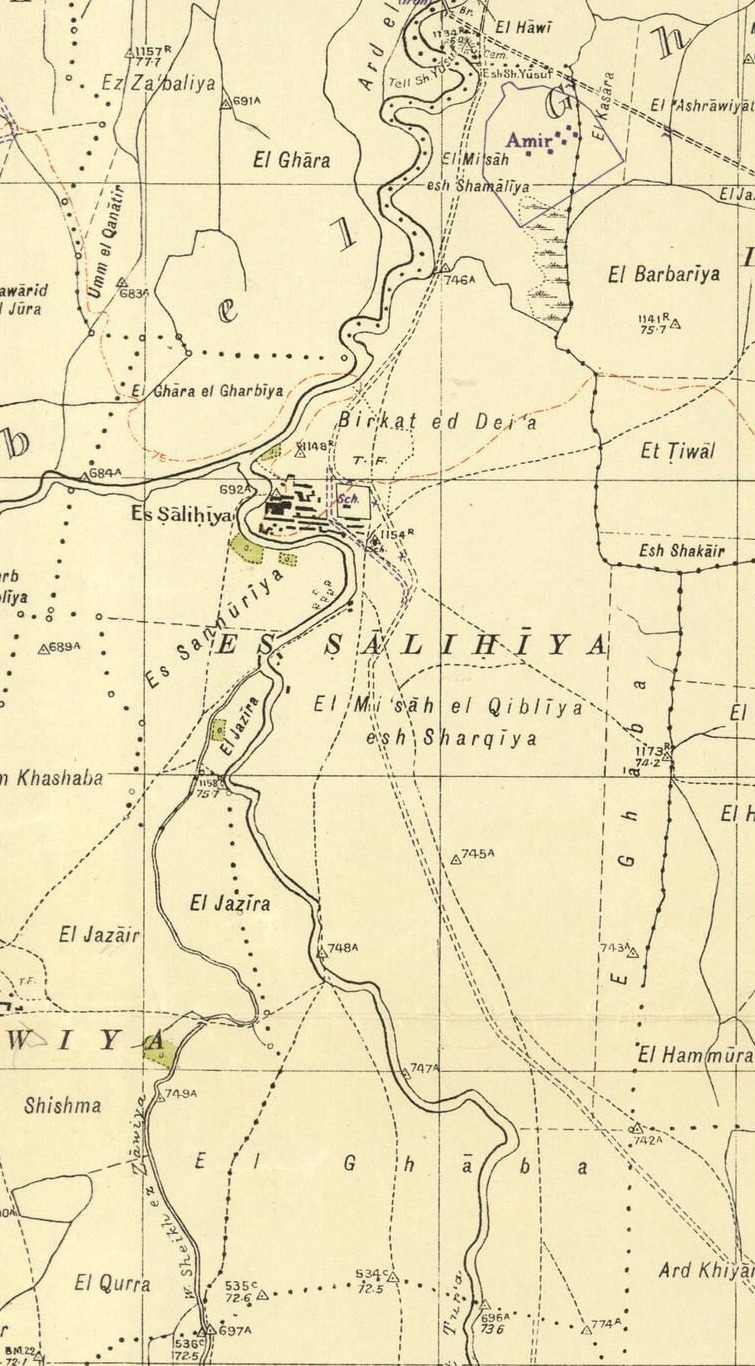
Kfar Blum was founded near the village of Al-Salihiyya, shown here in 1942, the year prior to its founding.

Kibbutz Kfar Blum was founded in November 1943 by the Labor Zionist Habonim (now Habonim Dror) youth movement, adjacent to the Palestinian village of Al-Salihiyya. The founding members of the kibbutz were primarily from the United Kingdom, South Africa, the United States and the Baltic countries. The kibbutz was named in honor of Léon Blum, the Jewish socialist former prime minister of France who was the focus of a widely publicized, and ultimately unsuccessful, show trial in 1942 mounted by the collaborationist Vichy regime.

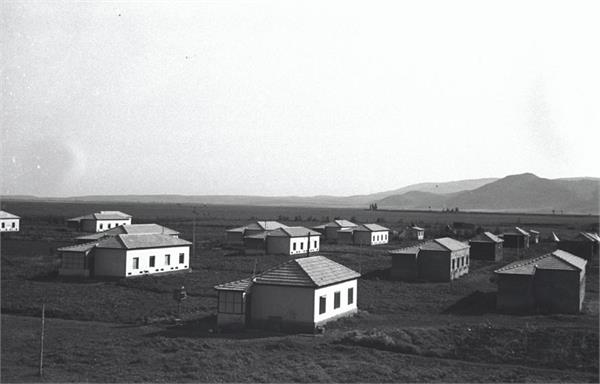
Kfar Blum 1947

== Economy ==
Agriculture (cotton, dairy, fruit) and light industry (metal working) have formed the primary economic basis for the kibbutz. In recent years this has been supplemented increasingly by tourism. Kfar Blum's location near the Jordan River at the foot of Mount Hermon has made it a center for outdoor recreational activities including walking, hiking, kayaking, rafting and bird watching.

== Education and culture ==
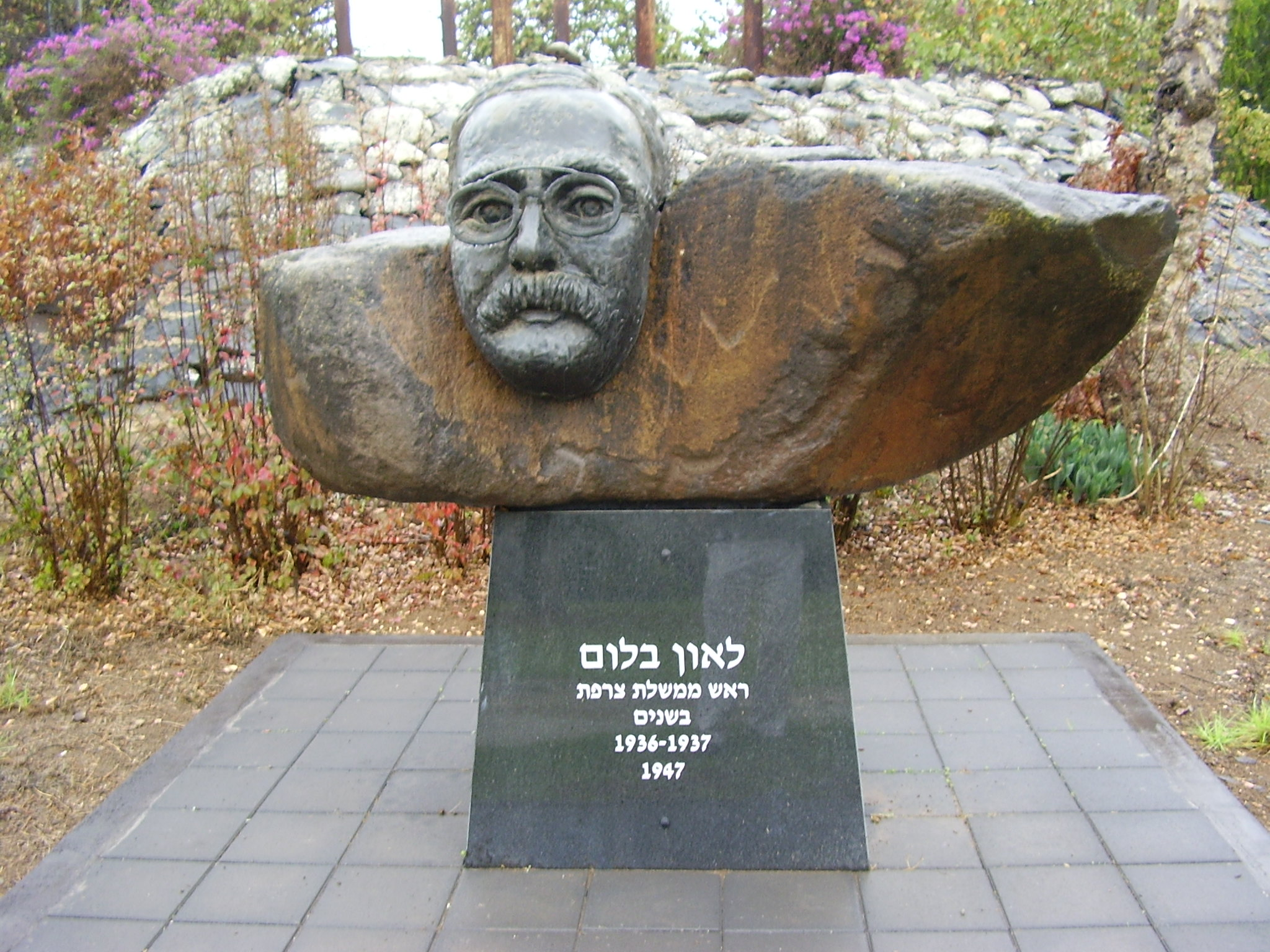
Leon Blum memorial in kibbutz Kfar Blum

The kibbutz has a regional school, a sports arena and a hotel. It was also home to Hapoel Galil Elyon, a top division basketball team, which in 1993 became the first club from outside Tel Aviv to win the championship.

For 24 years, between 1969 and 1993, Kfar Blum was home to the American Class, an academic-year-long program for an annual cohort of 15 to 30 U.S. and Canadian 10th-graders. Founded by Kfar Blum member Pinchas Rimon, American Class participants lived with kibbutz teenagers, held kibbutz jobs, were “adopted” into kibbutz families, and attended school in a classroom of the Emek Hahula High School.

Since 1985 Kfar Blum has been the site of the annual Voice of Music Festival in Upper Galilee, also referred to as the Kfar Blum Festival, a chamber music festival that is held in mid-summer. This week-long event has grown to become the premier chamber music festival in Israel, drawing 15,000 visitors in recent years.

== Notable people ==
- Danny Sanderson
