= John MacGregor (sportsman) =

English travel writer and canoeist (1825–1892)

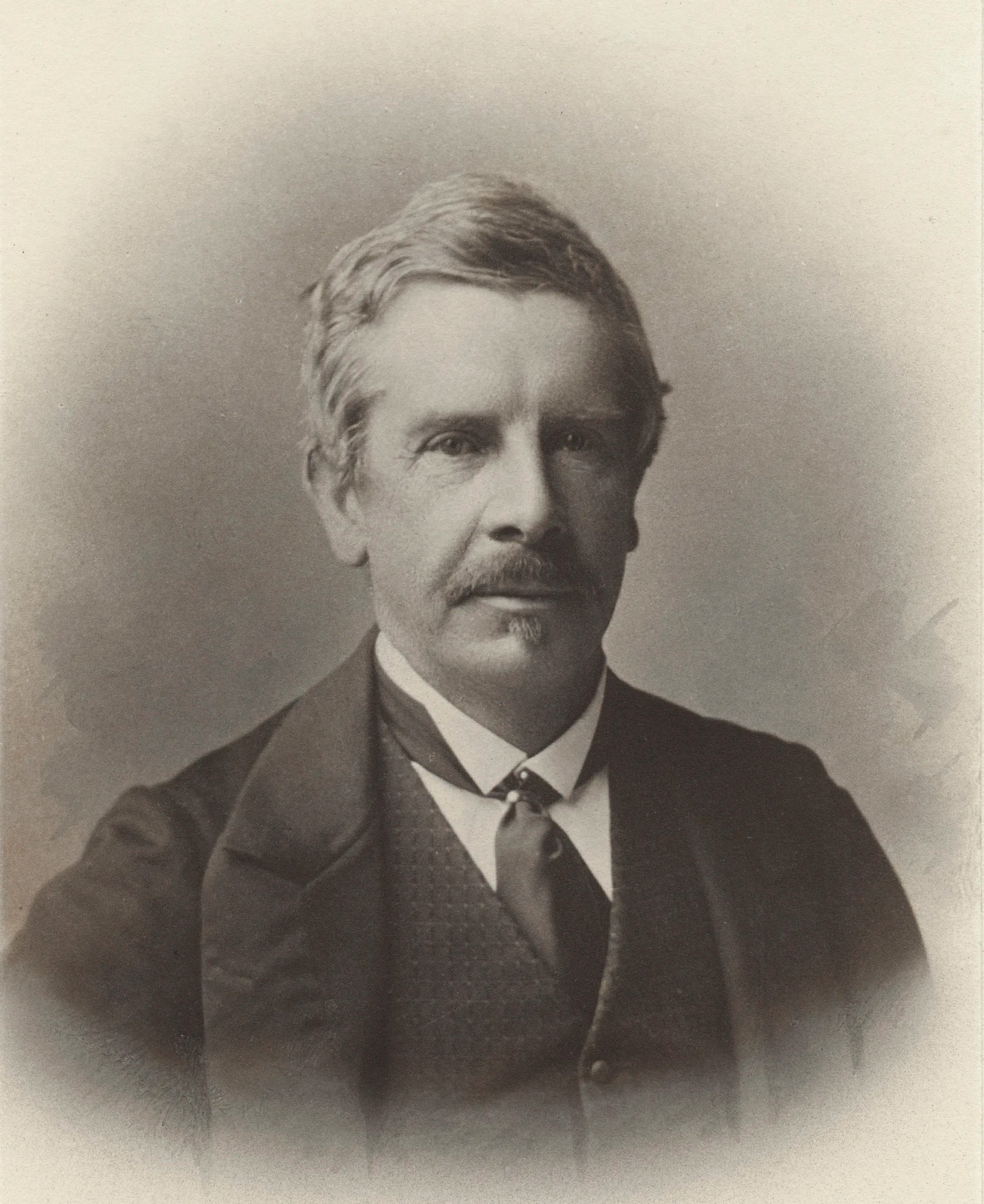
MacGregor in c. 1890

John MacGregor (24 January 1825 Gravesend – 16 July 1892 Boscombe, Bournemouth), nicknamed Rob Roy after a renowned relative, was an English explorer, travel writer and philanthropist. He is generally credited with the development of the first sailing canoes and with popularising canoeing as a sport in Europe and the United States. He founded the British Royal Canoe Club (RCC) in 1866 becoming its first Captain and also founded American Canoe Association in 1880.

MacGregor worked as a barrister in London, and was an accomplished artist who drew all the illustrations in his travel books.

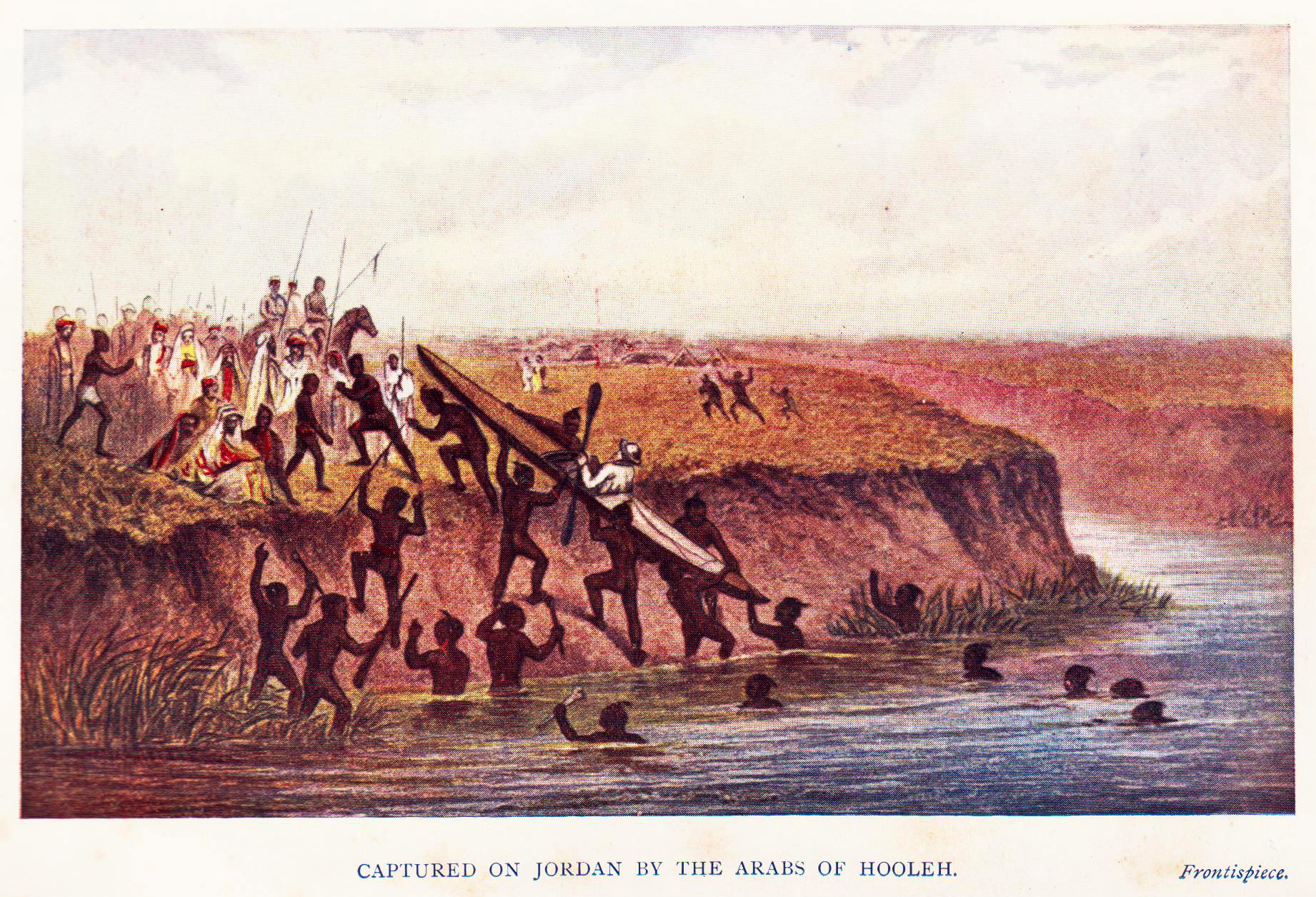
John MacGregor in his Rob Roy canoe captured during his exploration of the upper reaches of the River Jordan. Drawn by MacGregor himself.

== Early life ==
MacGregor was born in Gravesend to Major Duncan MacGregor, a Scottish soldier, and Elizabeth, the daughter of Sir William Dick, Baronet of Prestonfield. When he was four weeks old, he was amongst the survivors of the sinking of the Kent. His schooling followed his father's postings, and he attended The King's School in Canterbury and Trinity College in Dublin. He graduated from Trinity College, Cambridge, having shown a talent for mathematics. He was known by his peers for his strong Christian faith and although he had aspired to be a missionary and also considered civil engineering, his scientific interests led him to London to study for the Bar, specialising in patent law. During his time in the capital, he became heavily involved with philanthropy and was instrumental in launching the Ragged School movement's Shoeblack brigade. He also became involved with open air missions and was also able to follow his passion for travel. In 1849 he spent nine months exploring southern Europe, Palestine and Egypt. He was introduced to canoeing during a trip to the United States and Canada in 1858.

== Boat designer ==
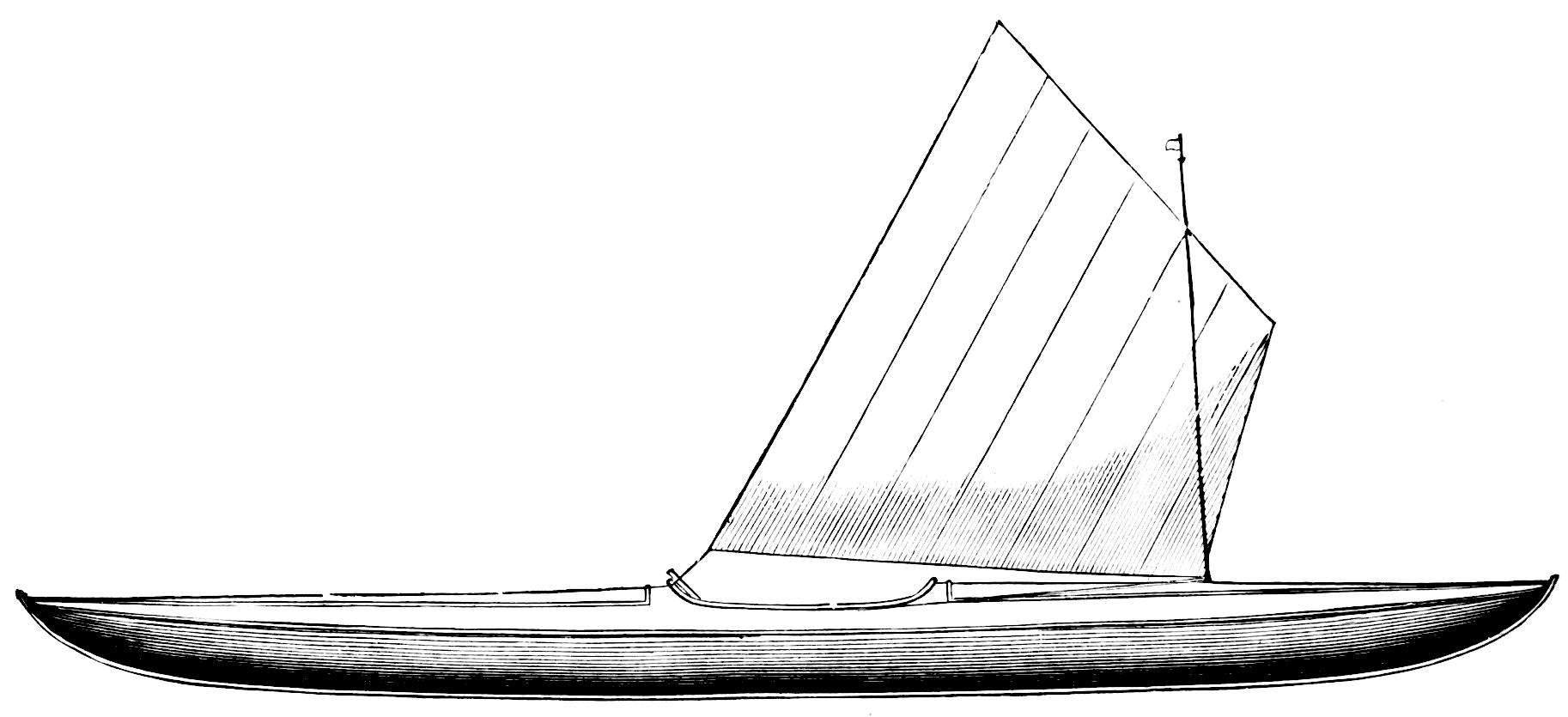
The Rob Roy canoe

MacGregor was a champion marksman but turned to boating when a railway accident left him unable to hold a rifle steady.

The boat he designed was a 'double-ended' kind of canoe inspired by the Northern American kayaks, but built in Lambeth of lapstrake oak planking, decked in cedar covered with rubberised canvas with an open cockpit in the center. It measured 15 feet long, 28 inches wide, nine inches deep and weighed 80 pounds (36 kg) and was designed to be used with a double-bladed paddle. He named the boat Rob Roy after the celebrated Scottish outlaw of the same name, to whom he was related.

During the 1860s, he had at least seven similar boats built and he sailed and paddled them in Europe, the Baltic and the Middle East. One of those canoes is now based at the National Maritime Museum Cornwall.

The version he used for his expedition to Egypt, Syria and Palestine in 1868/69 was slightly smaller but was designed so that he could sleep in it. He was accompanied by a dragoman, Hany, and two retainers who maintained the various base camps on the journey. He visited the Nile Delta, the rivers of Damascus, as well as parts of the River Jordan and Kishon River. Whilst exploring the water courses above Lake Hula he was taken prisoner by villagers from Al-Salihiyya who lifted both him and the Rob Roy canoe out of the river whilst he kept them at bay with his paddle. He was responsible for the first scientific survey of the area.

== Writings ==
In 1866, he published A Thousand Miles in the Rob Roy Canoe, which popularised the design and, more importantly, the concept: "in walking you are bounded by every sea and river, and in a common sailing-boat you are bounded by every shallow and shore; whereas, ...a canoe [can] be paddled or sailed, or hauled, or carried over land or water".

The book was internationally successful; with subsequent books and public appearances, it earned MacGregor more than ten thousand pounds. Scottish author Robert Louis Stevenson's 1876 voyage by canoe through the canals and rivers of France and Belgium, published in 1878 as An Inland Voyage, used "Rob Roy" canoes.

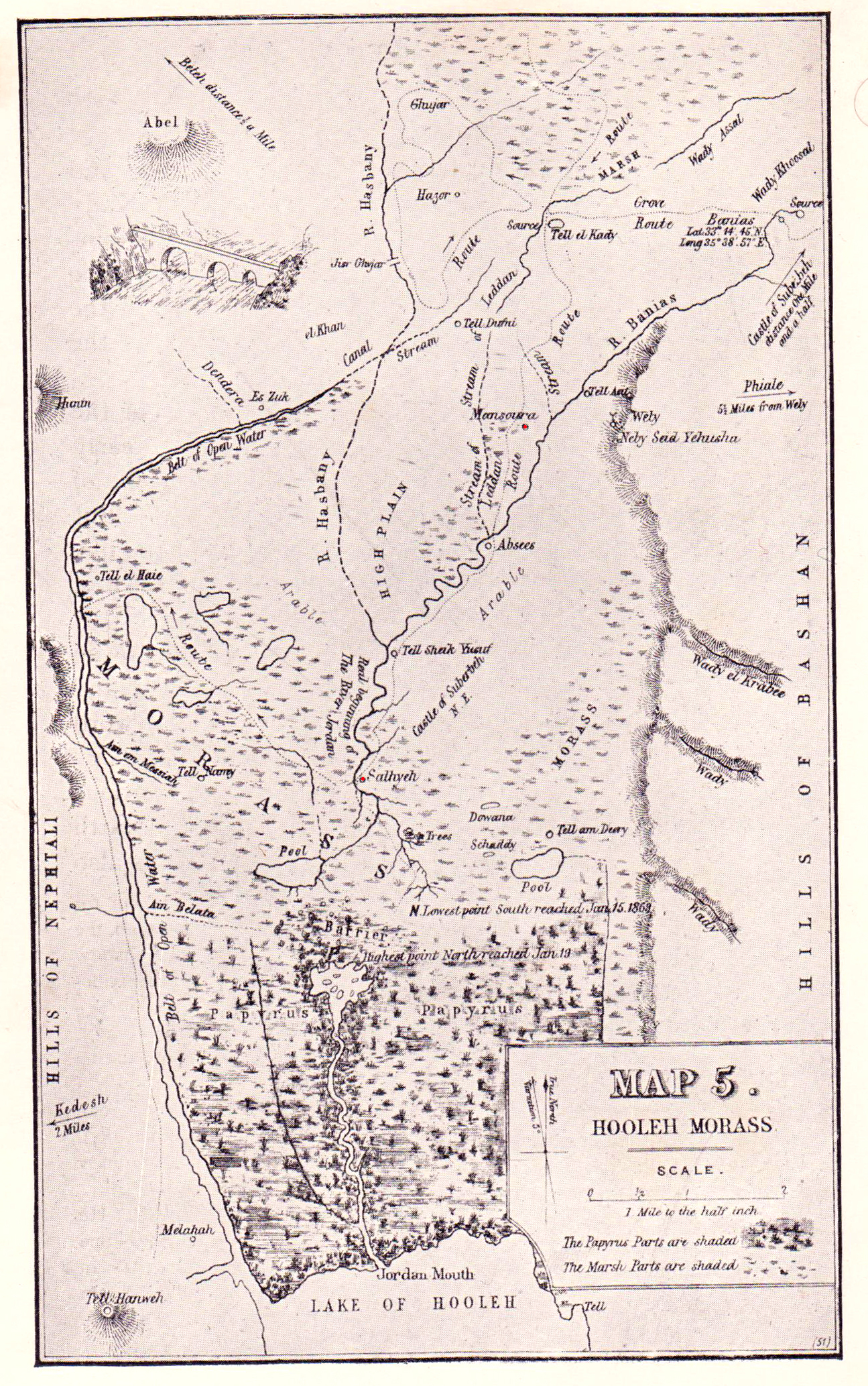
Map of upper reaches of the Jordan River made by John MacGregor from data gathered during his visit in January 1869.

== Death ==
Died 16 July 1892 in Bournemouth, aged 67.

== Published works ==
- Three Days in the East, or the Dead Sea, Jerusalem, and the Dessert - Illustrating more than 100 Scripture Texts; with Woodcuts (1850). The book was later republished in America under the title The Eastern Traveler or Descriptions of Places and Customs, Mentioned in the Bible, published by Presbyterian Board of Publication, Philadelphia, 1900.
- The Language of Specifications of Letters Patent for Inventions (1856) - A Treatise on that Department of Patent Law which relates to the framing of Specifications, and to the Decisions concerning their Language, with the important Cases, down to June 1856.
- The Law of Reformatories (1856) - A Handbook of the Reformatories of Great Britain and Ireland, with the regulations of the Privy Council, Poor Laws, &c., and the Statutes relating to the subject.
- Ragged Schools: their Rise, Progress, and Results
- Popery in A.D. 1900
- The Ascent of Mont Blanc - With four views printed in oil colours, illustrating the ascent of the mountain by Messrs. MacGregor and Shuldham, when Mr. Albert Smith revisited the Grand Mulets, together with Lord Killeen, Col. De Bathe, Mr. W. Russell (of the Times), and Messrs. Burrowes and Fanshawe.
- Eastern Music - About 20 airs, from Greece, Turkey, Palestine and Egypt, with accompaniments, description, and anastatic sketches.
- Go Out Quickly into the Streets and Lanes of the City - A tract on open air preaching.
- Our Brothers and Cousins: A Summer Tour in Canada and the States (1859)
- A Thousand Miles in the Rob Roy Canoe (1866)
- The Voyage Alone In The Yawl 'Rob Roy' (1867)
- The Rob Roy on the Baltic (1867)
- The Rob Roy on the Jordan, Nile, Red sea, & Gennesareth, &c (1869)
- Toil and Travel, A True Story of Roving and Ranging When On a Voyage Homeward Bound Round the World, published by T. Fisher Unwin (1892)

== See also ==
- Christopher Costigan explored the River Jordan and the Dead Sea in 1835
- Thomas Howard Molyneux explored the River Jordan and the Dead Sea in 1847
- William Francis Lynch explored the River Jordan and the Dead Sea in 1848
- Warington Baden-Powell early adopter and designer of sailing canoes
