= Merom =

Merom may refer to:

- Merom, Indiana, a town in the United States
- Lake Merom, a former lake in the Hula Valley of Israel
- Merom Golan, a kibbutz in the Golan Heights
- Merom (microprocessor), code name for the mobile variant of the Intel Core 2 processor
- Ancient Merom, thought to be located at the site of Meiron
- Battle of the Waters of Merom in the Hebrew Bible
