= Lehavot HaBashan =

Lehavot HaBashan: לְהֲבוֹת הַבָּשָׁן (Hebrew)
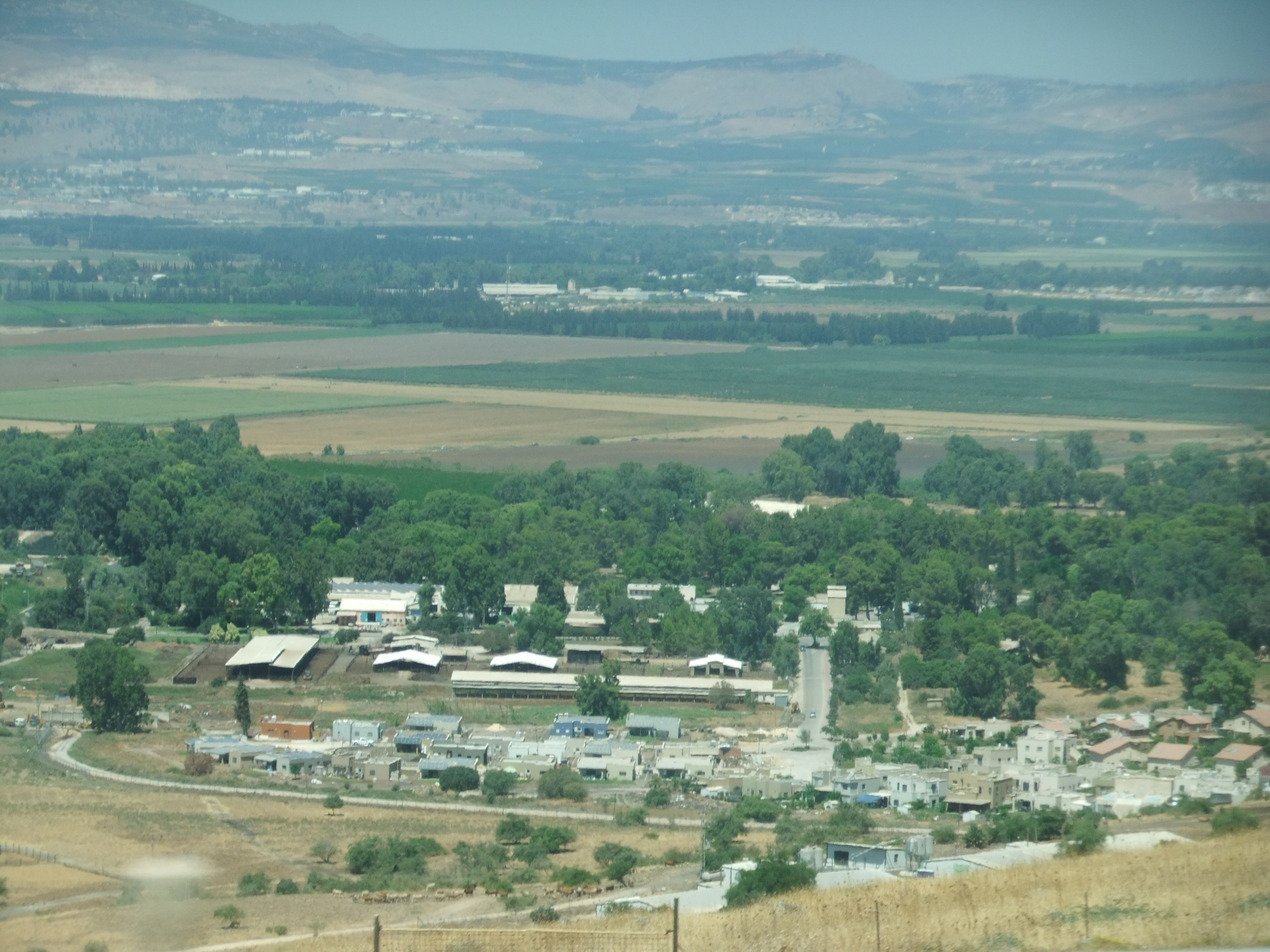

- Location within Northeast Israel
- Coordinates: 33°8′29″N 35°38′48″E
- Country: Israel
- District: Northern
- Subdistrict: Safed
- Council: Upper Galilee
- Affiliation: Kibbutz Movement
- Founded: 1945
- Founder: German and Polish refugees and Hashomer Hatzair members
- Population (2024): 865

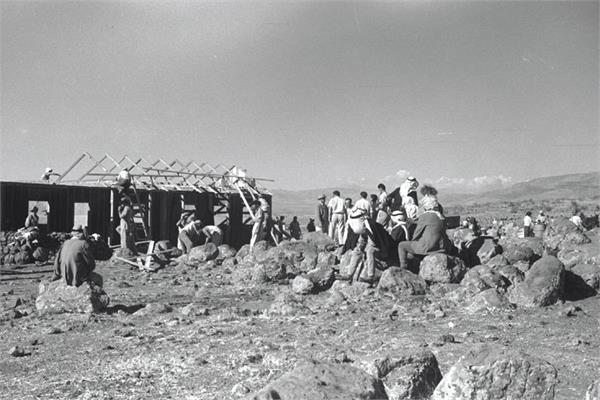
The original Lehavot HaBasham under construction in 1945

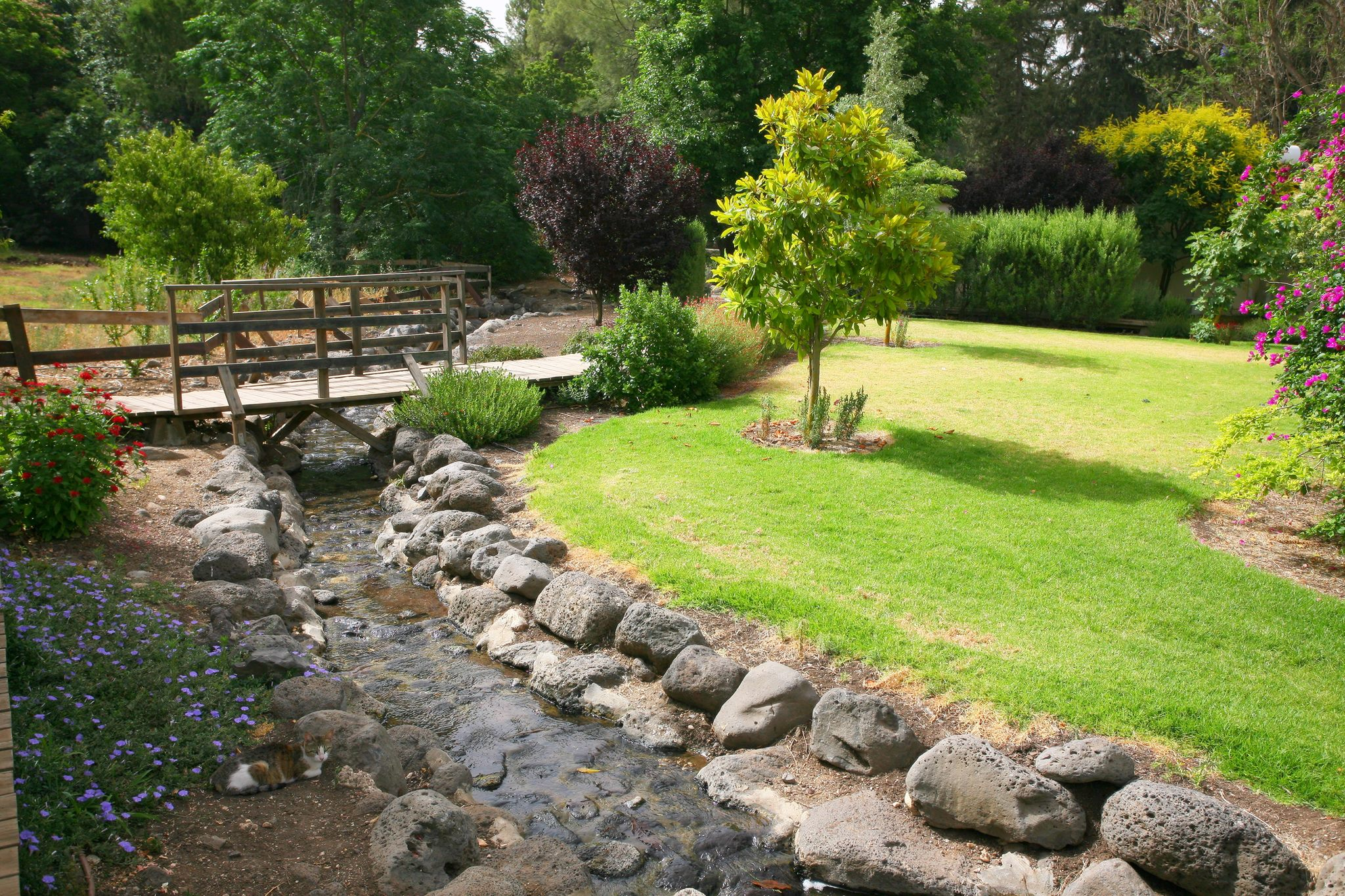
Streambed in Lehavot HaBashan

Lehavot HaBashan (Hebrew: לְהֲבוֹת הַבָּשָׁן, lit. 'Flames of the Bashan') is a kibbutz in northern Israel. Located in the Hula Valley around ten kilometres southeast of Kiryat Shmona, it falls under the jurisdiction of Upper Galilee Regional Council. In 2024 it had a population of 865.

== History ==
The village was established in 1945 on land which had formally belonged to kibbutz Amir, by former Hashomer Hatzair members and the Lehavot gar'in, which was composed of immigrants from Germany and Poland brought to the country by Youth Aliyah. Kibbutz Amir had moved north in 1942, to land bought from an Arab village, al-Dawwara, in order to avoid the winter floods.

One of them was Dov Zakin, later a member of the Knesset. In 1947 the kibbutz moved to its present location. The name is derived from that of the founders' gar'in, together with the Golan Heights, also known as Bashan Mountains, which overlook the kibbutz.

== Economy ==
LVT, a fire protection equipment manufacturer that specializes in the development of fire protection and suppression systems for the military, industrial, and commercial sectors, is located on Kibbutz Lehavot HaBashan.

== Notable people ==
- Israel Gutman (1923–2013), Polish-born Israeli historian and Holocaust survivor
- Bella Hvatskin (born 1978), Russian-born artist and costume designer
- Amiram Levin (born 1946), Aluf (Major General) of the Israel Defense Forces
- Lonah Chemtai Salpeter (born 1988), Kenya-born Israeli Olympic marathon runner
