= Sde Nehemia =

Sde Nehemia: שדה נחמיה (Hebrew)
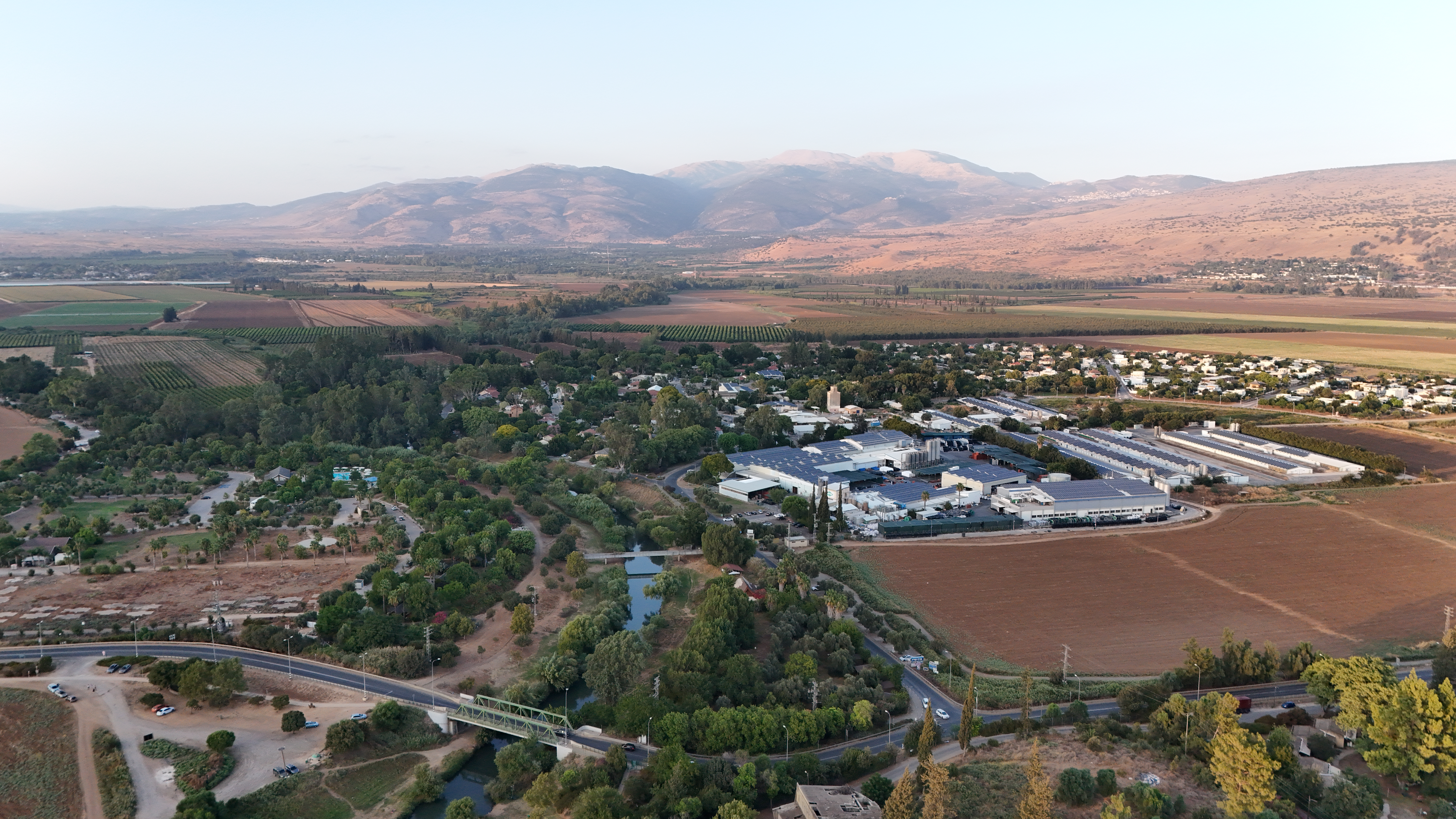
- View of Sde Nehemia

- Location within Northeast Israel
- Coordinates: 33°11′12″N 35°37′21″E
- Country: Israel
- District: Northern
- Subdistrict: Safed
- Council: Upper Galilee
- Affiliation: Kibbutz Movement
- Founded: 19 December 1940
- Founder: Austrian, Dutch and Czechoslovak Jews
- Population (2024): 1,147

Sde Nehemia (Hebrew: שדה נחמיה, lit. 'Nehemia's Field') is a kibbutz in northern Israel. Located in the Upper Galilee, it falls under the jurisdiction of Upper Galilee Regional Council. In 2024 it had a population of 1,147.

The Banias and Hasbani Rivers converge on the grounds of the kibbutz.

== History ==
Sde Nehemia was founded on 19 December 1940 by immigrants from Austria, the Netherlands and Czechoslovakia, on land bought from the Arab village of al-Dawwara. It was originally known as Kvutzat Huliot, but later renamed after Nehemia de Lieme, a Dutch banker and Zionist activist who served as head of the Jewish National Fund.

In the early days of the kibbutz, the pioneers lived in tents in the midst of malaria-infested swampland. One of them, Yehuda Abas, a physician, distributed anti-malarial pills free of charge to the local Arab population but discovered they were being cut into four and sold for large sums of money to Arabs from Syria and Lebanon. Abas's solution was to introduce injections.

Rafael Reiss from Sde Nehemia was one of seven parachutists sent into Nazi-occupied Europe in 1944. He was captured by the Nazis and executed on 20 November 1944.

Sde Nehemia is located near the depopulated Palestinian village of Al-'Abisiyya.

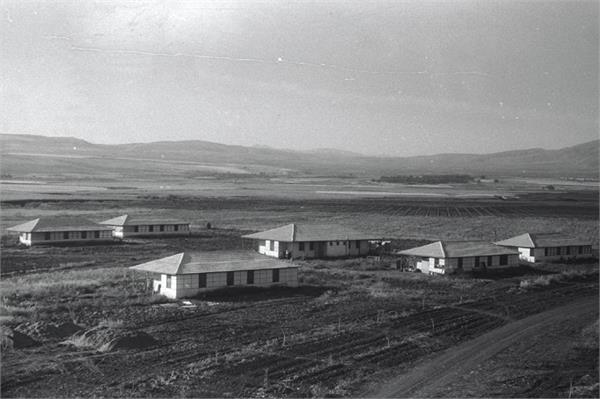
Sde Nehemia 1944

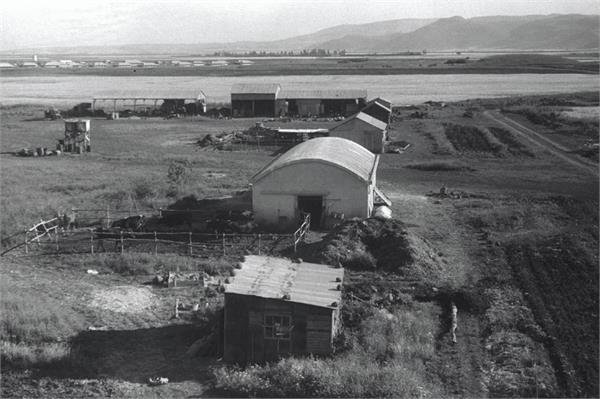
Sde Nehemia 1944

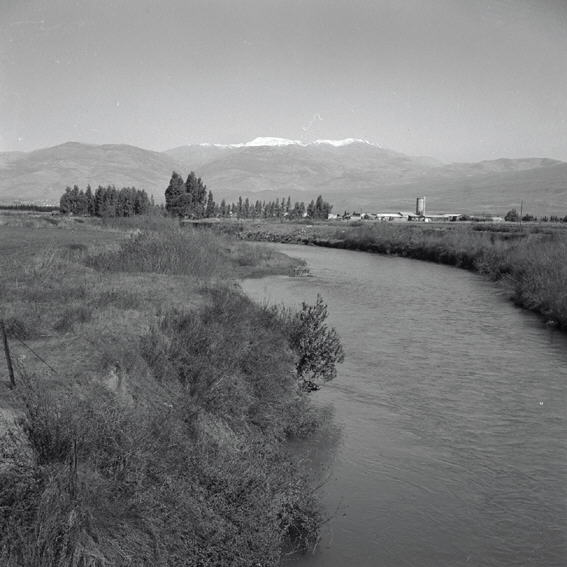
Sde Nehemia 1945

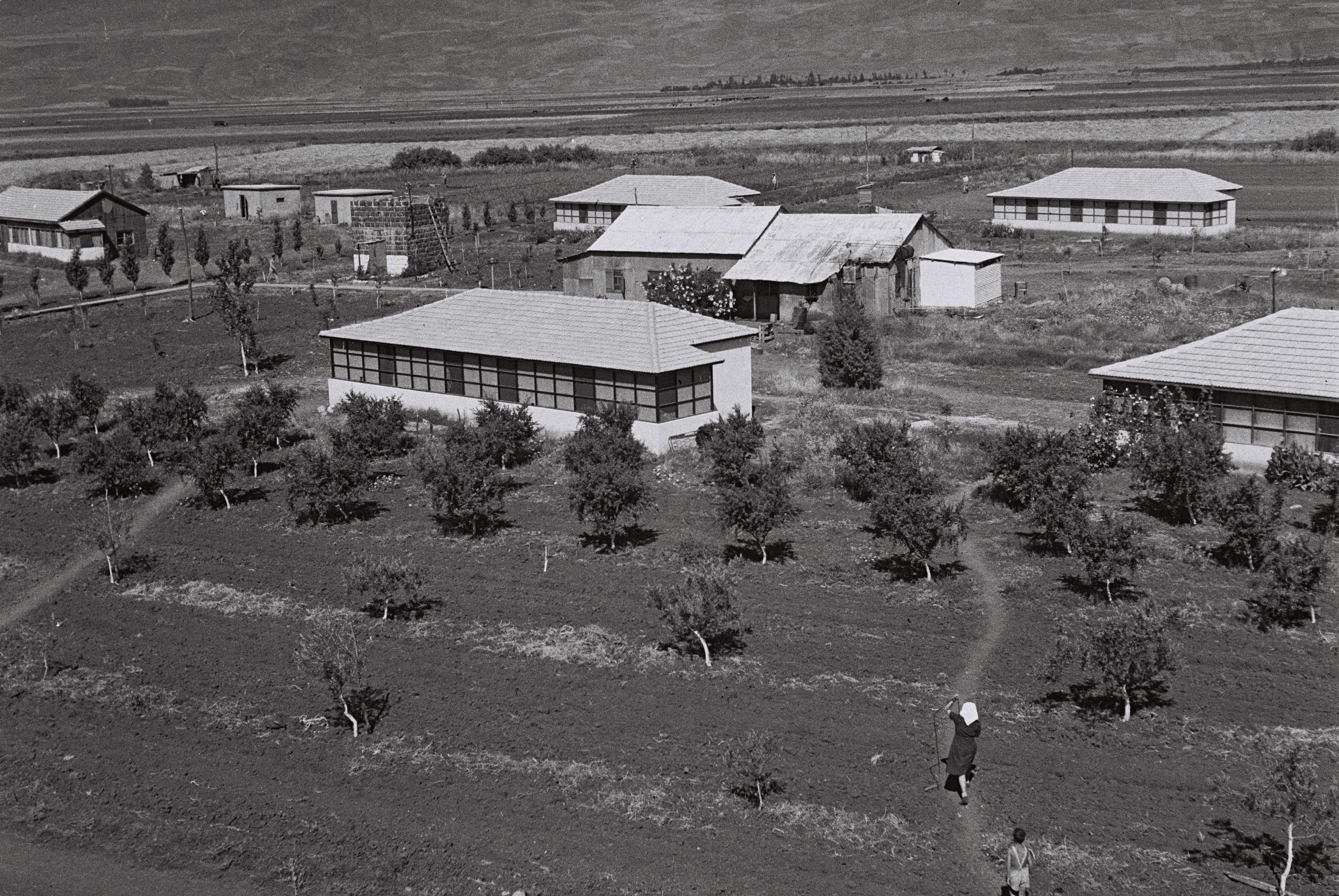
Sde Nehemia, 1946

== Economy ==
Located in the fertile Hula Valley between the Golan Heights and Lebanon, agriculture is a significant source of income. The kibbutz also owns a plastics factory, Huliot, a leading manufacturer of pipe systems and plastic products. Huliot specializes in flow products for water supply, drainage, sewage and greywater recycling which it sells on the local and global markets. The factory was established in 1947.
