= Al-'Abisiyya =

Al-'Abisiyya العابسية
- Village
- Etymology: From personal name
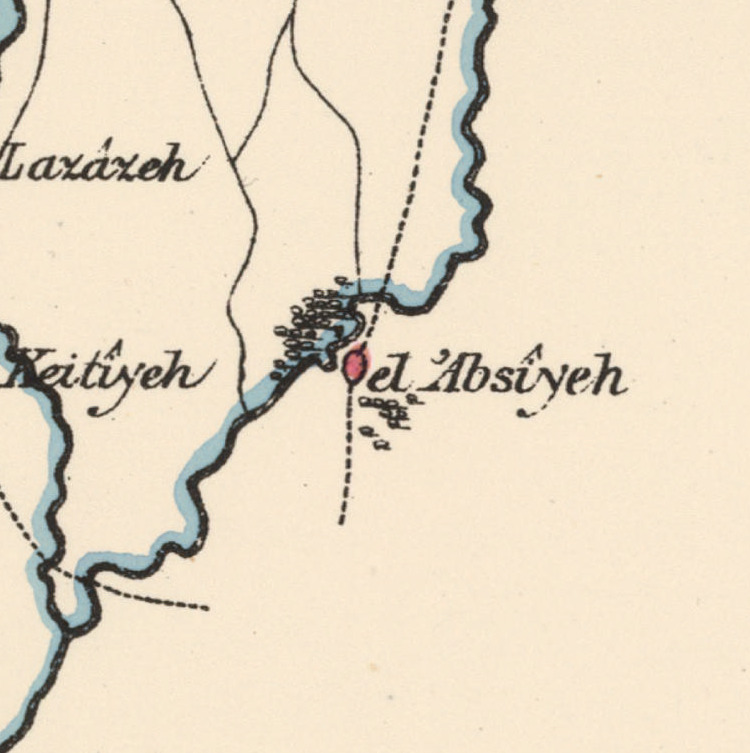
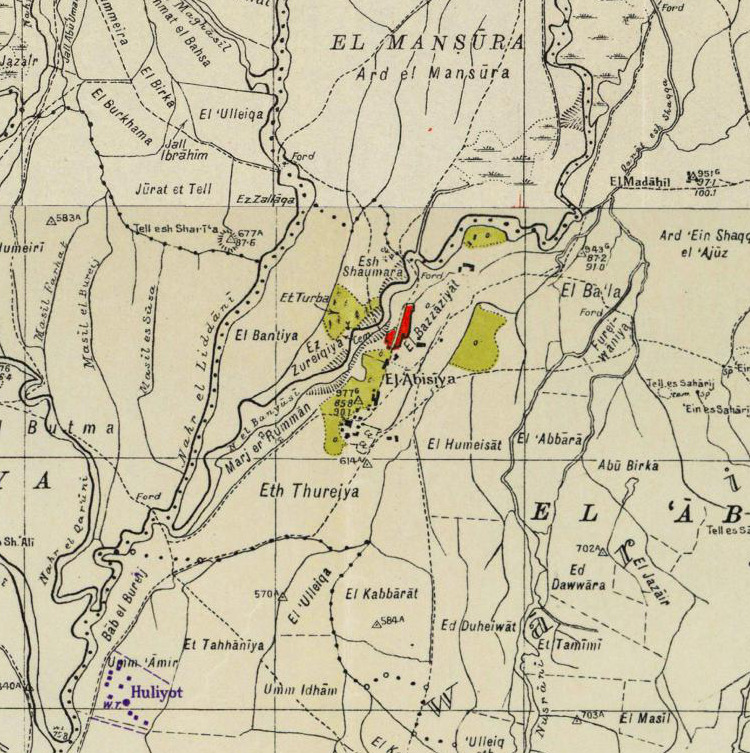
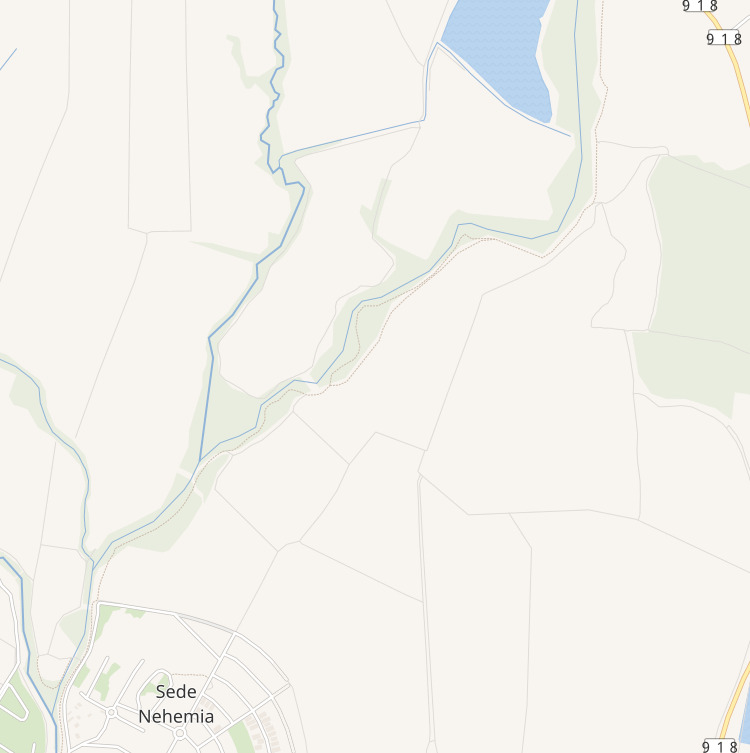
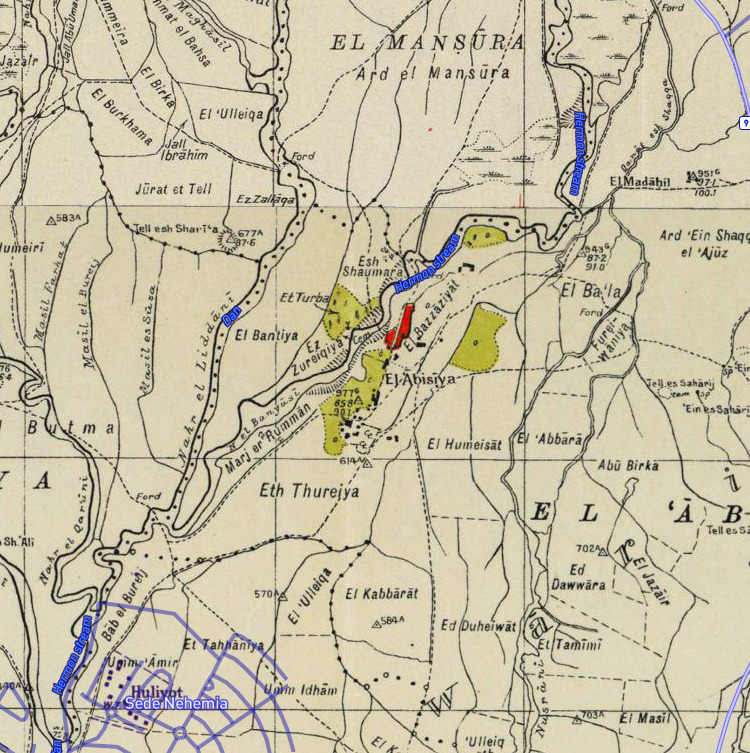
- 1870s map 1940s map modern map 1940s with modern overlay map A series of historical maps of the area around Al-'Abisiyya (click the buttons)

- Location within Mandatory Palestine
- Coordinates: 33°11′55″N 35°37′59″E
- Palestine grid: 209/289
- Geopolitical entity: Mandatory Palestine
- Subdistrict: Safad
- Date of depopulation: May 25, 1948

Population (1945)
  - Total: 1,220
- Cause(s) of depopulation: Influence of nearby town's fall
- Current Localities: Sde Nehemia

Al-'Abisiyya or al-'Absiyya (Arabic: العابسية), was a Palestinian Arab village in the District of Safad. It was depopulated during the 1948 Arab-Israeli War on May 29, 1948, by The Palmach's First Battalion of Operation Yiftach. It was located 28.5 km northeast of Safad near to the Banyas River which the village relied on for irrigation.

== History ==
A Greek boundary stone from the reign of Diocletian (284–305 CE) records the village name Οσηα (Osea), from the Aramaic word for "foundation", among the markers associated with Paneas in the northern Hula Valley. Osea has been identified with al-ʿĀbsiya.

In the Mamluk period and Early Ottoman periods the site was called Khiyām ʿAbs.

The village contained the khirbas of Tall al-Sakhina, Tall al-Shari'a, and al-Shaykh Ghannam.

In 1881, the PEF's Survey of Western Palestine (SWP) described the village as "a collection of mud hovels in the plain of the Huleh, on the Nahr Banias containing seventy Moslems. They till the land, which is arable round the village, there is a large supply of water and some trees near the village."

=== British Mandate era ===
In the 1931 census of Palestine, during the British Mandate for Palestine, the village had a population of 609, all Muslims, in a total of 31 houses.

In the 1945 statistics the population of Al-'Abisiyya (including nearby Azaziyat, Ein Fit and Khirbat es Summan) was 1,220 Muslims, with a total of 15,429 dunams of land, according to an official land and population survey. Arabs used 4 dunums of land for citrus and bananas, 6,390 dunams were plantations and irrigable land, 2,830 for cereals; while 17 dunams was built-up (urban) area.

=== 1948, aftermath ===
In May 1948, Sde Nehemia requested, "somewhat shamefacedly", 1,700 dunams of land from the newly depopulated village of Al-'Abisiyya.

== Bibliography ==
- Conder, C.R.; Kitchener, H.H. (1881). The Survey of Western Palestine: Memoirs of the Topography, Orography, Hydrography, and Archaeology. Vol. 1. London: Committee of the Palestine Exploration Fund.
- Department of Statistics (1945). Village Statistics, April, 1945. Government of Palestine.
- Hadawi, S. (1970). Village Statistics of 1945: A Classification of Land and Area ownership in Palestine. Palestine Liberation Organization Research Center. Archived from the original on 2018-12-08.
- Khalidi, W. (1992). All That Remains:The Palestinian Villages Occupied and Depopulated by Israel in 1948. Washington D.C.: Institute for Palestine Studies. ISBN 0-88728-224-5.
- Mills, E., ed. (1932). Census of Palestine 1931. Population of Villages, Towns and Administrative Areas. Jerusalem: Government of Palestine.
- Morris, B. (2004). The Birth of the Palestinian Refugee Problem Revisited. Cambridge University Press. ISBN 978-0-521-00967-6.
- Palmer, E.H. (1881). The Survey of Western Palestine: Arabic and English Name Lists Collected During the Survey by Lieutenants Conder and Kitchener, R. E. Transliterated and Explained by E.H. Palmer. Committee of the Palestine Exploration Fund.
