= Waters of Merom =

Biblical site north of the Sea of Galilee

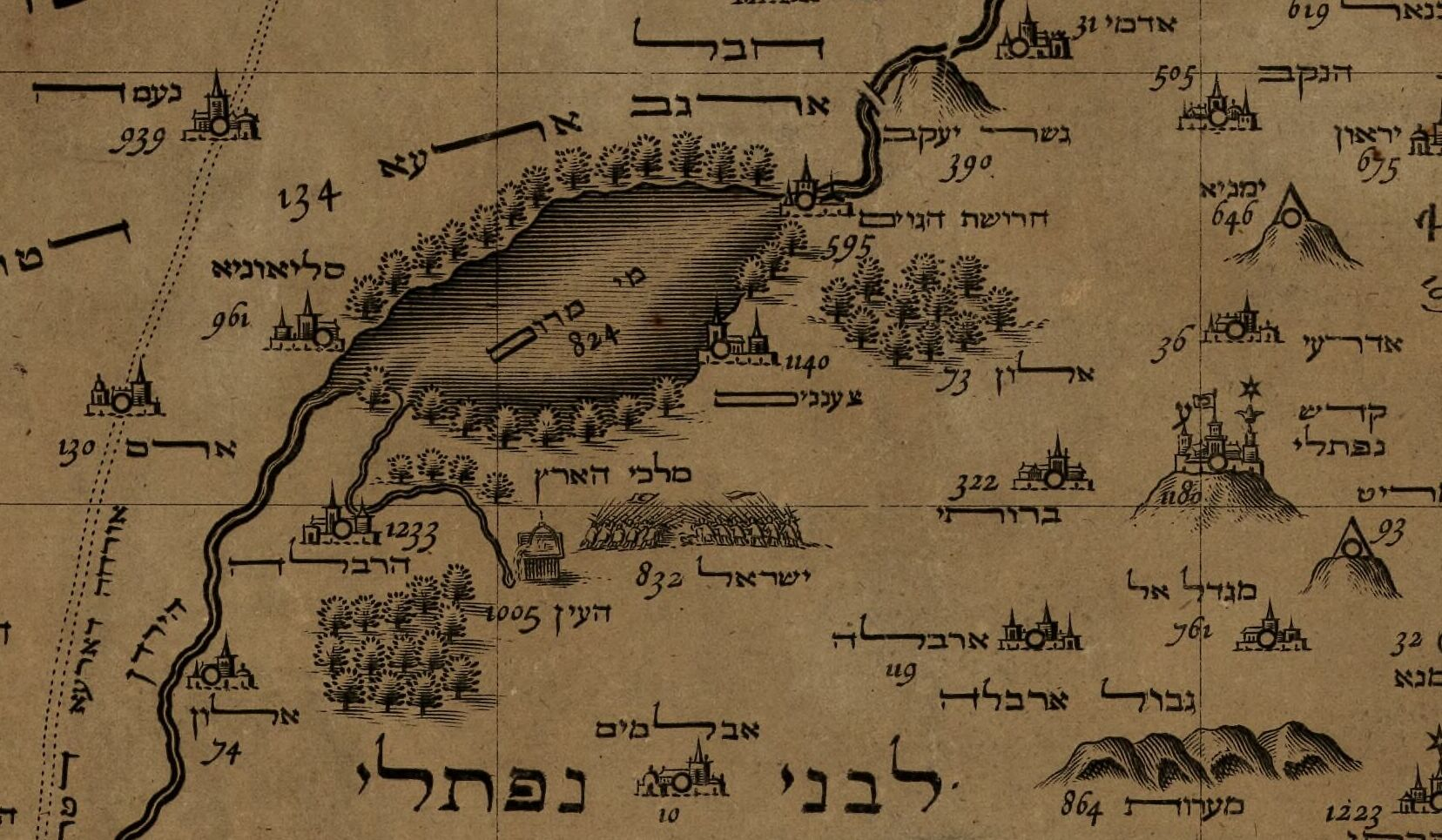
Waters of Merom map by Yakov ben Abraham Zaddik (Jacob Justo), in Hebrew

The water(s) of Merom is a Biblical site, mentioned in the Book of Joshua as the site of the Battle of the Waters of Merom where the alliance of Canaanite kings under Jabin met and were defeated during Joshua's conquest of Canaan.

== Location ==
The "waters of Merom" used to be identified with a lake ten miles north of the Sea of Galilee, formed by the River Jordan.

The "waters of Merom" were previously thought to be Lake Hula, but this is disputed and the name was more likely to apply to a spring or stream in the area.

The Horns of Hittin is an alternative location suggested by Zvi Gal in 1988.
