= Dov Zakin =

Israeli politician (1922–1986)

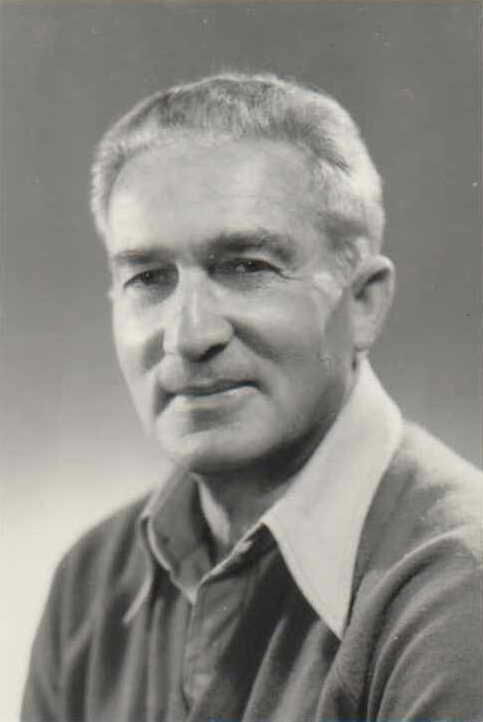

Faction represented in the Knesset
- 1969–1977: Alignment
- 1977: Mapam
- 1981–1984: Alignment

Personal details
- Born: 29 September 1922 Baranavichy, Poland
- Died: 4 September 1986 (aged 63)

Dov Zakin (Hebrew: דב זכין; 29 September 1922 – 4 September 1986) was an Israeli politician who served as a member of the Knesset for the Alignment and Mapam between 1969 and 1977 and again from 1981 to 1984.

== Biography ==
Zakin was born in Baranavichy in Poland (now in Belarus). He emigrated to Mandatory Palestine in 1937, where he was educated at the Ben Shemen Youth Village, before studying political science and economics at Tel Aviv University.

In 1945 he was amongst the founders of kibbutz Lehavot HaBashan. In 1946 he helped found the Wadi Ara branch of the Eretz Yisrael Workers Union. In 1950, 1952 and 1963 he travelled to the United States as an emissary for Hashomer Hatzair, and between 1959 and 1961 served as secretary of the Peace Movement.

A member of the Mapam secretariat, he was elected to the Knesset on the Alignment list (an alliance of Mapam and the Labor Party) in 1969.

In 1970, while visiting the United States, he met with State Department officials, Joseph Sisco and Undersecretary of State Roger Davies, who assured him that America would "not abandon or jeopardize the security of Israel."

He was re-elected in 1973 and in 1977 was part of the Mapam faction that briefly broke away from the Alignment. He lost his seat in the 1977 elections, but returned to the Knesset after the 1981 elections. He lost his seat for a final time in the 1984 elections.

In 1986 he became a member of the board of directors of the World Zionist Organization.
