= Bella Hvatskin =

Israeli multidisciplinary artist

Bella Hvatskin בלה חבצקין
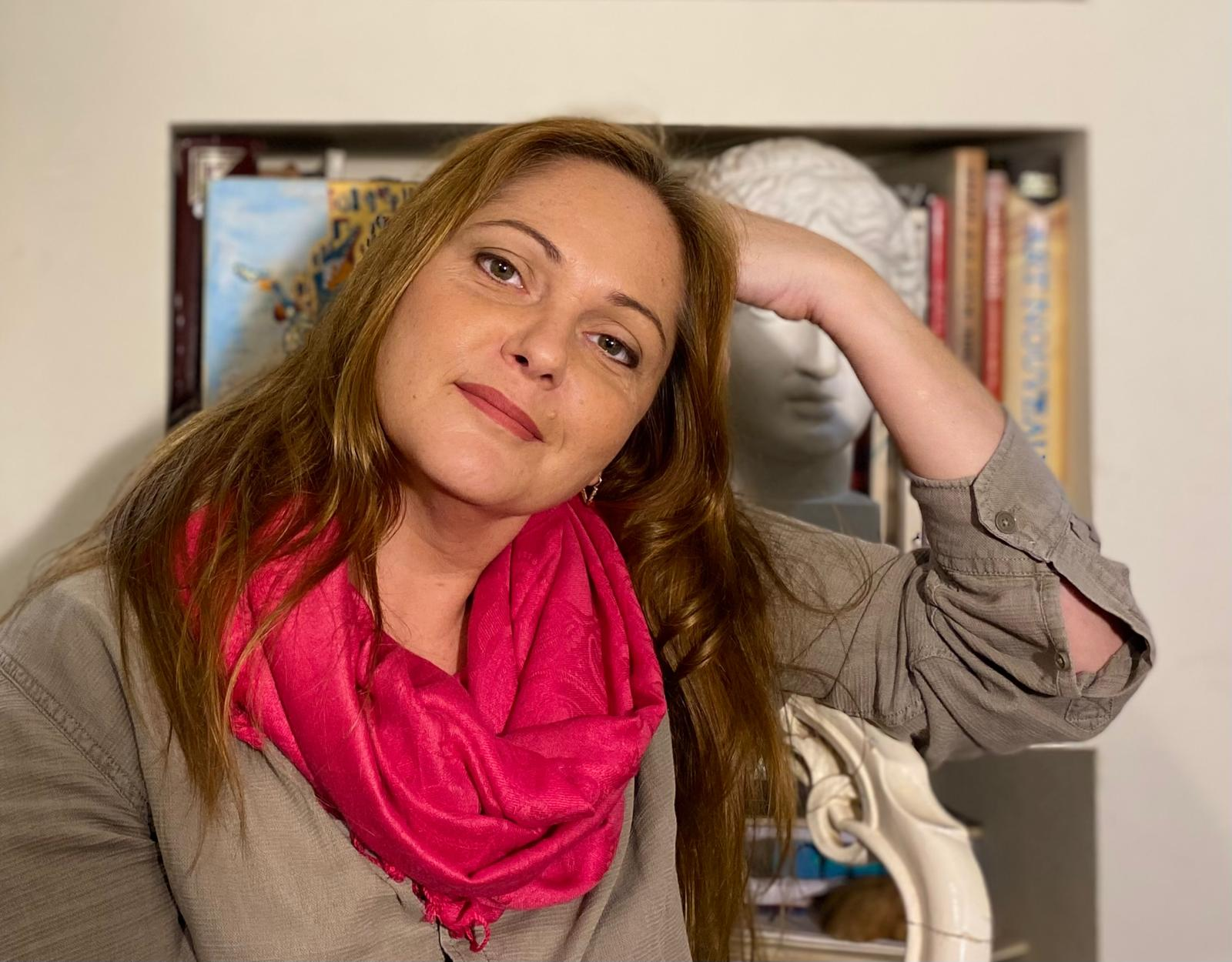
- Born: February 26, 1978 (age 48); Moscow, Soviet Union

Bella Hvatskin (Hebrew: בלה חבצקין, née, Bella Yosifovna Hvatskina; born February 26, 1978) is a Russian-born Israeli multidisciplinary artist and costume and stage designer.

== Early life and education ==
Bella Yosifovna Hvatskina was born in Moscow, Russia. During her childhood she experienced antisemitism as the only Jewish student in her class. She studied painting and art privately from a young age, and in her teenage years attended the 1905 Art College in Moscow (1991–1993). At the age of 15 she visited Israel through the Naale program, and her parents enrolled her in a girls’ boarding school in the ultraorthodox city Bnei Brak, but she did not adapt and returned to Moscow. In 1995–1996 she studied psychology at Moscow University.

At the age of 19, Bella decided to immigrate to Israel alone. Between 1997 and 2000, she studied art and stage design for theatre at the Haifa University.

== Career ==
Between 2000 and 2021 Hvatskin designed costumes for more than forty Israeli theatre productions, many of them for the Mar’eh Theatre in Kiryat Shmona, which was destroyed by fire in 2018. In 2002 she won first prize for set design for the play Why the Butterfly Broke (by Yael Nitzan, directed by Gal Gutman) presented at the Haifa Children's Theatre Festival. She won the Golden Hedgehog Award twice: in 2016 for costume design for To Life by Gili Ivri (also directed by him), and in 2017 for set design of Bullfight by Mike Bartlett, directed by Orly Rabinyan (both at the Mar’eh Theatre).

In 2021–2022 Bella designed costumes for the feature film Days of Noah, and in 2023 she designed sets and props for the feature film Jacob's trouble, both directed by Dalton Thomas and produced by Maranatha Productions.

Hvatskin runs a studio in Kibbutz Lehavot HaBashan, “Gut Painting ,” where she teaches painting workshops for children and adults and exhibits her works. Her artistic practice deals with dismantling the rigid education she received in the Soviet Union, as well as questions concerning body, inside and outside, physical place, migration, and identity. As an art teacher and facilitator, Bella aims to make art accessible as a language for her students. She developed a technique she calls Fulfillment Paintings, which seeks to realize students’ wishes through painting and creativity.

Since 2016, Bella has been writing a blog of short autobiographical stories about her childhood in the Soviet Union, each accompanied by a painting drawn on pages from an old book by Italian communist children's author Gianni Rodari, which she received as a birthday gift at age eight.

In 2024, following the Iron Swords War, she founded Yes² – a global initiative to create a 40-kilometer patchwork quilt, each square painted and decorated by different people, expressing the alternative reality they wish to see in the world. According to Hvatskin, the aim is to display the creation in decision-making arenas that affect our lives – from the Knesset to the United Nations.

== Personal life ==
At age 20 she married for the first time, but suffered economic abuse in the marriage and chose to end it. At age, 22 she met the actor Amiad Kalushiner; the two married and moved to the Galilee, to Kibbutz Lehavot HaBashan. Later, Kalushiner managed the Mar’eh Theatre in Kiryat Shmona.

== Theater awards ==
- 2002 - 2002 First award for set design for the "breaking a butterfly" By Yael Navy. Haifa Festival children's shows. (directed by Gal Gutman)
- 2015 - "Golden Porcupine" award for design for "To life" by Gili Ivri (directed by Gili Ivri)
- 2017 - "Golden Porcupine" award for her set design for "Bull" by Mike Bartlett (directed by Orly Rabanyan)

== Exhibitions ==
=== Solo ===
- 2016: Art Galil 1, Kfar Gilady (Curator Hanny Hotam)
- 2018: Art Galil 3, Kfar Gilady (Curator Daliya Zalzberg)
- 2019: Mahanaim Gallery, Kibuts Mahanaim - "Inside out" (Curator Nava Harel Shoshani)

2* 2020: Reshon Lazion city Gallery - "The Russian Compound" (Curator Efi Gen)

- 2023: Bar-David museum - "Value dous not change" (Curator Avi Ifergan).

=== Group ===
- 2008: Museum Hutzot Jaffa (Curator Efi Fabien)
- 2010: The Jaffa Knight Tower Gallery - “Light” (Sasha Genelin)
- 2012: The Advocate Towers Gallery, Tel Aviv (Curator Bella Zaichik)
- 2013: Lake Ra’anana Gallery - “Winter Salon” (Curator Bella Zaichik)
- 2019: Habarbur Gallery, Jerusalem - "The place" (Curator Sara Ounil)
- 2020: Pop Up museum TLV (Curator Yaara Zachs)
- 2021: Art Galil 5 Kfar Gilady (Curator Daliya Zalzberg).

=== As Curator ===
- 2014: Curator of Tel Hai Gallery - “Galilee Winds”
- 2017: Curator of Art Galil 2 in Kfar Gilady.
