= Al-Dawwara =

Al-Dawwara الدوّارة
- Village
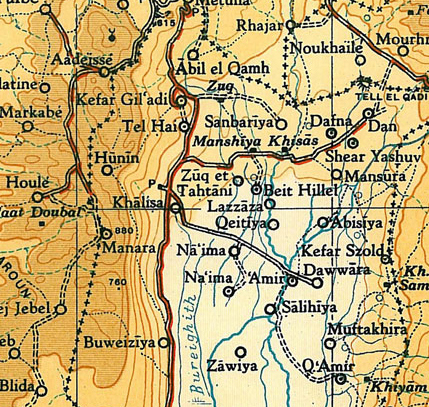
- Al-Dawwara, 1946

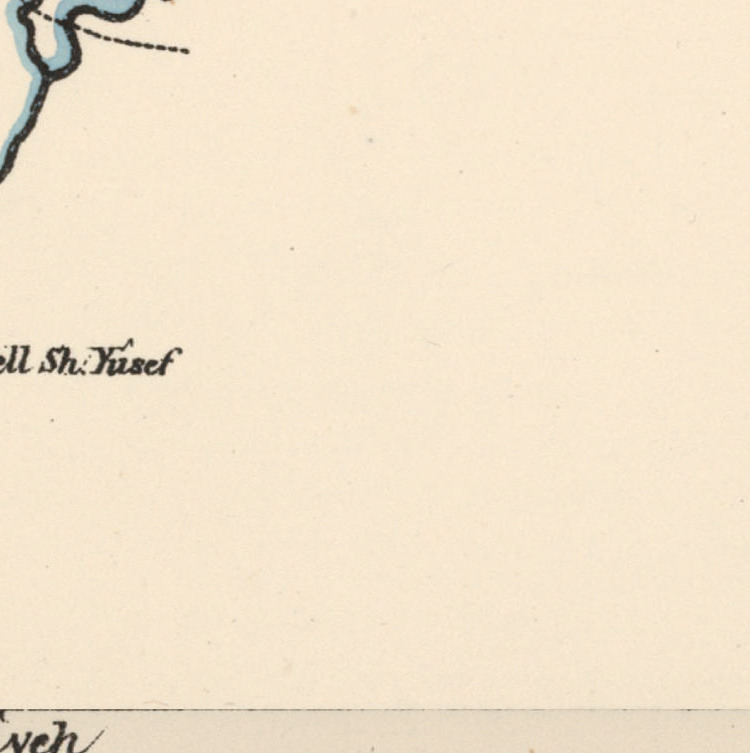
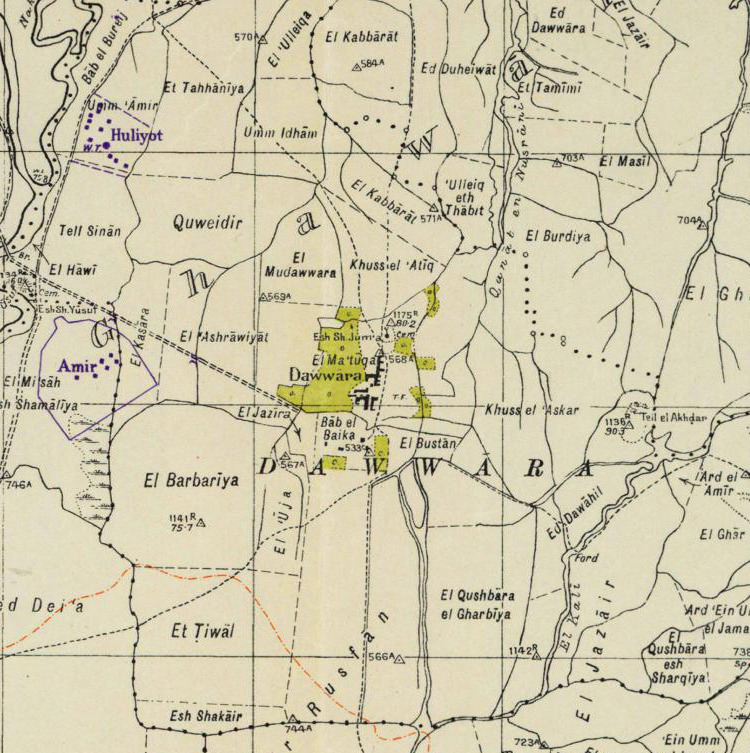
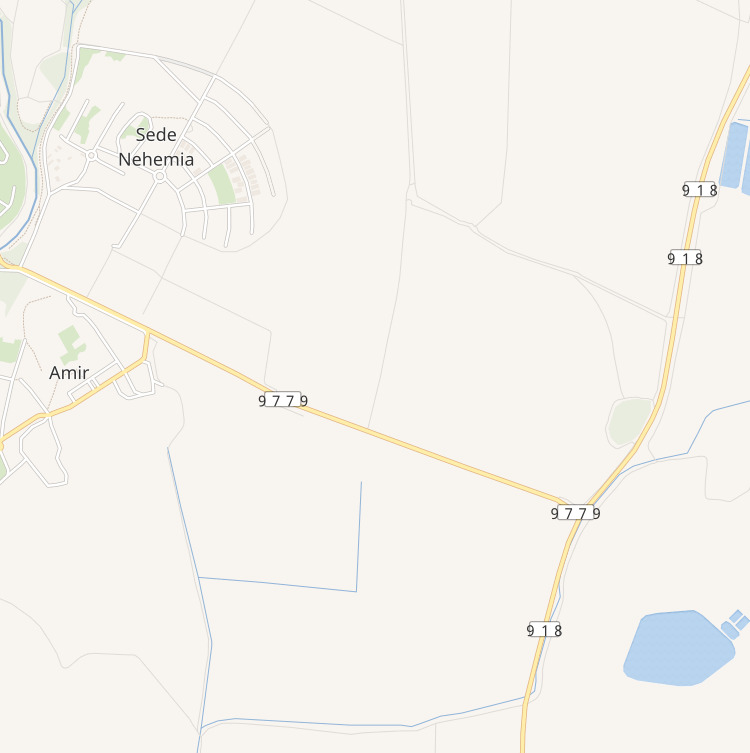
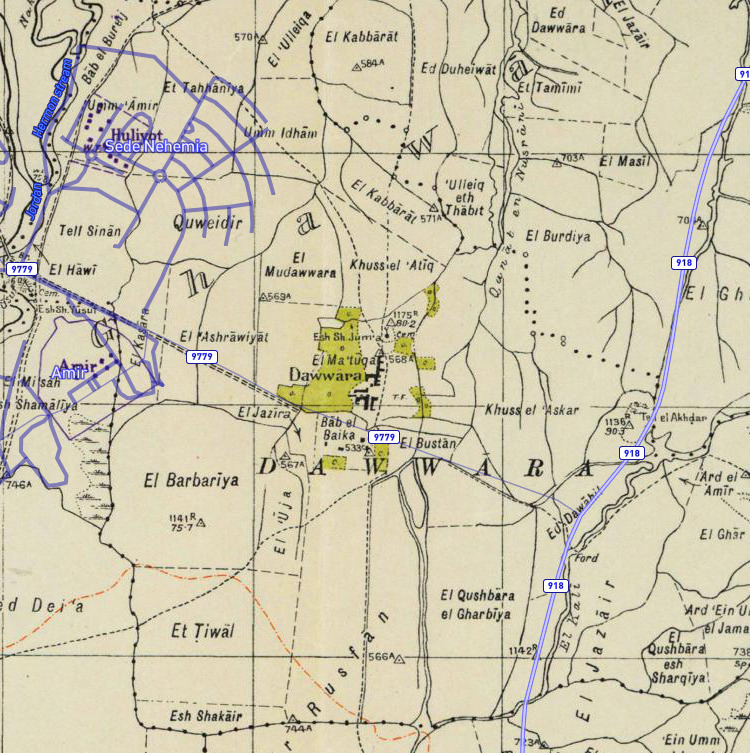
- 1870s map 1940s map modern map 1940s with modern overlay map A series of historical maps of the area around Al-Dawwara (click the buttons)

- Location within Mandatory Palestine
- Coordinates: 33°10′43″N 35°38′02″E
- Palestine grid: 209/287
- Geopolitical entity: Mandatory Palestine
- Subdistrict: Safad
- Date of depopulation: May 25, 1948

Area
  - Total: 2,753 dunams (2.753 km^{2}; 1.063 sq mi)

Population (1945)
  - Total: 700
- Cause(s) of depopulation: Whispering campaign
- Current Localities: ‘Amir, Sde Nehemia

Al-Dawwara (Arabic: الدوّارة) was a Palestinian Arab village in the Safad Subdistrict. It was depopulated during the 1948 War on May 25, 1948, by the Palmach's First Battalion of Operation Yiftach. It was located 27 km northeast of Safad, bordering three rivers that flowed into lake al-Hula: the al-Hasbani, Banyas, and Dan rivers.

In 1945 the village had a population of 1,100 (this figure included 400 Jewish residents of the Kibbutzim ‘Amir and Sde Nehemia).

== History ==
A Greek Diocletianic boundary stone associated with Paneas (Banias) records the village name ΔΗΡΑ (Dēra) among the rural localities of the northern Hula Valley in the late Roman period. Roy Marom has proposed identifying Dēra with al-Dawwāra, arguing that the Arabic toponym represents preservation through phonetic and semantic transformation from the late Roman name. The identification is supported primarily by the convergence of the epigraphic attestation with spatial placement within the Panias boundary-stone landscape, while the archaeological evidence is treated as contextual rather than independently decisive.

=== British Mandate era ===
According to the 1931 census of Palestine, one Christian lived there, and the remainder were Muslim. Most of the residents were farmers.

In 1939 the Kibbutz ‘Amir was founded nearby, and Sde Nechemya in 1940.

In the 1944/45 statistics Dawwara had population of 700 Muslims, where Arabs owned 2,753 dunams of land. Of this, they used 68 dunums to the growing of citrus fruits and bananas, 281 for cereals, 2,135 dunums for plantations and irrigable land, while 52 dunams was built-up (urban) area.

The older parts of the village had narrow streets. Most of the houses were adobe, with a few of basalt.

=== 1948, aftermath ===
On receiving news of an imminent attack on the village by Operation Yiftach, many villagers fled on May 25, 1948, but some sources have indicated that some military force in practice was used to drive out the Arabs from the village.

In 1992 the village site was described: "There are hardly any traces of the village left, only a few building stones at the edge of a fish pond remain on the site. The entire area has been converted into a fish hatchery."

The Israeli settlements of Kibbutz 'Amir and Sde Nechemya are both on Al-Dawwara village land. Lately, the area has been used for a fish hatchery.

== See also ==
- Nakba

== Bibliography ==
- Department of Statistics (1945). Village Statistics, April, 1945. Government of Palestine.
- Hadawi, S. (1970). Village Statistics of 1945: A Classification of Land and Area ownership in Palestine. Palestine Liberation Organization Research Centre. Archived from the original on 2018-12-08.
- Khalidi, W. (1992). All That Remains: The Palestinian Villages Occupied and Depopulated by Israel in 1948. Washington D.C.: Institute for Palestine Studies. ISBN 0-88728-224-5.
- Mills, E., ed. (1932). Census of Palestine 1931. Population of Villages, Towns and Administrative Areas. Jerusalem: Government of Palestine.
- Morris, B. (2004). The Birth of the Palestinian Refugee Problem Revisited. Cambridge University Press. ISBN 978-0-521-00967-6.
