= Battle of the Waters of Merom =

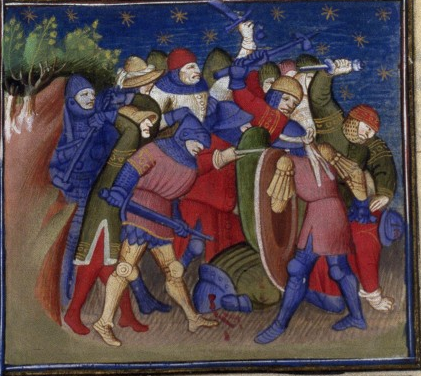
- Depiction of the battle in the Bible Historiale by Guyart des Moulins
Location	Waters of Merom
Result	Israelite victory

Belligerents
Twelve Tribes of Israelites	Coalition of Kanaanite city-states: Phillistines

Commanders and leaders
Joshua	Jabin King of Kanaan †

Casualties and losses
Unknown	All forces killed

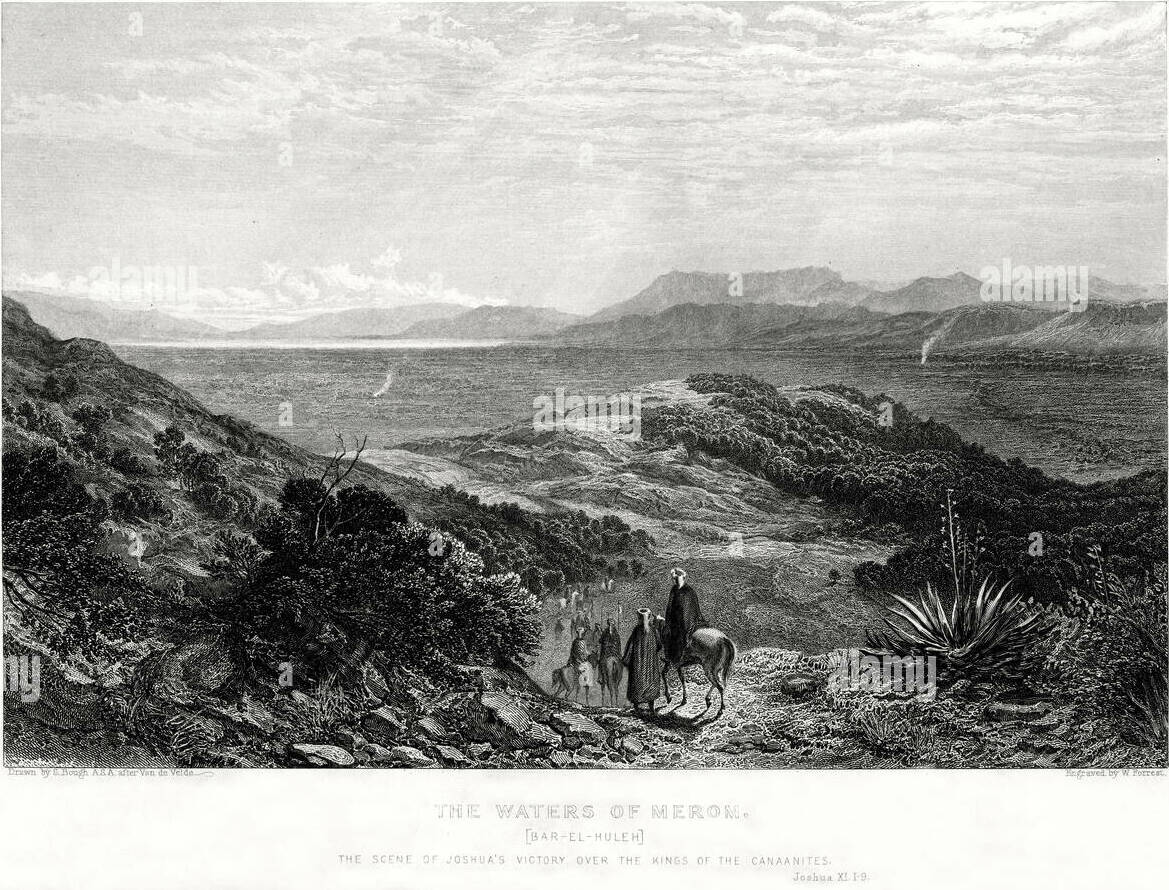
The Waters of Merom

According to Joshua 11 in the Hebrew Bible, the Battle of the Waters of Merom was a battle between the Israelites and a coalition of Canaanite city-states near the Waters of Merom. Archaeologist Nadav Na'aman has suggested that this battle definitely took place, and that its narrative "preserved some remote echoes of wars conducted in these places in early Iron Age I."

In the biblical narrative, around 40 years before the battle, the Israelites escaped from slavery in Egypt, setting out for the Exodus under the leadership of Moses. They entered Canaan near Jericho and captured several cities. An alliance of northern Canaanite city-states sent a united force to halt the Israelite invasion. The Israelites engaged in a preemptive strike, catching the Canaanite forces unaware and routing them with a fearsome head-on assault. The battle is described in Joshua chapter 11.

== See also ==
- Early Israelite campaigns
