= Hula Valley =

Agricultural wetland region in northern Israel

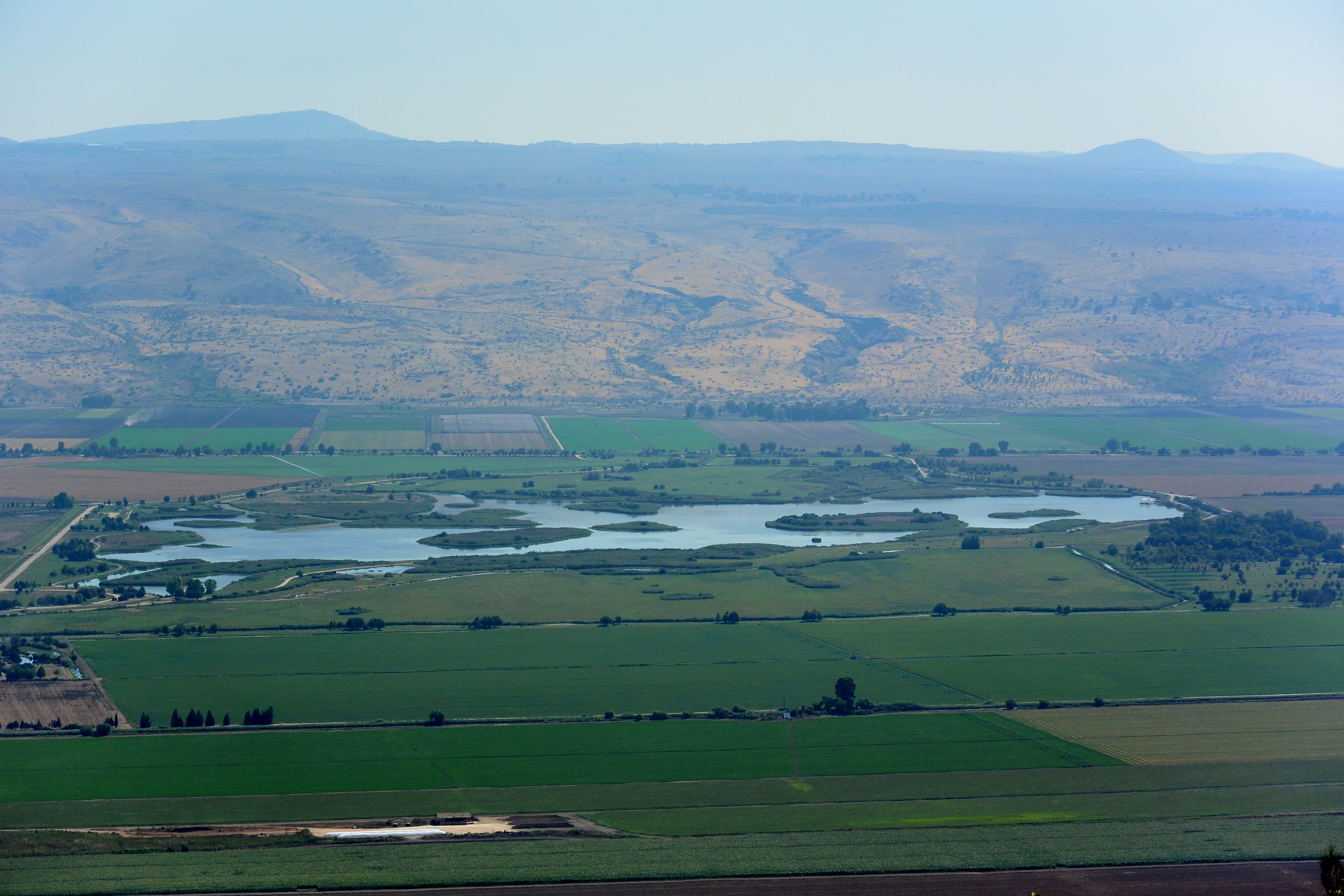
- View of Hula Valley

Naming
- Native name: עֵמֶק הַחוּלָה (Hebrew); سهل الحولة (Arabic)

Geology
- Type: Valley

Geography
- Country: Israel
- State/Province: Northern District
- Population center: Kiryat Shmona
- Coordinates: 33°06′12″N 35°36′33″E
- Interactive map of Hula Valley

Designations

Ramsar Wetland
- Official name: Hula Nature Reserve
- Designated: 12 November 1996; 30 years ago
- Reference no.: 868

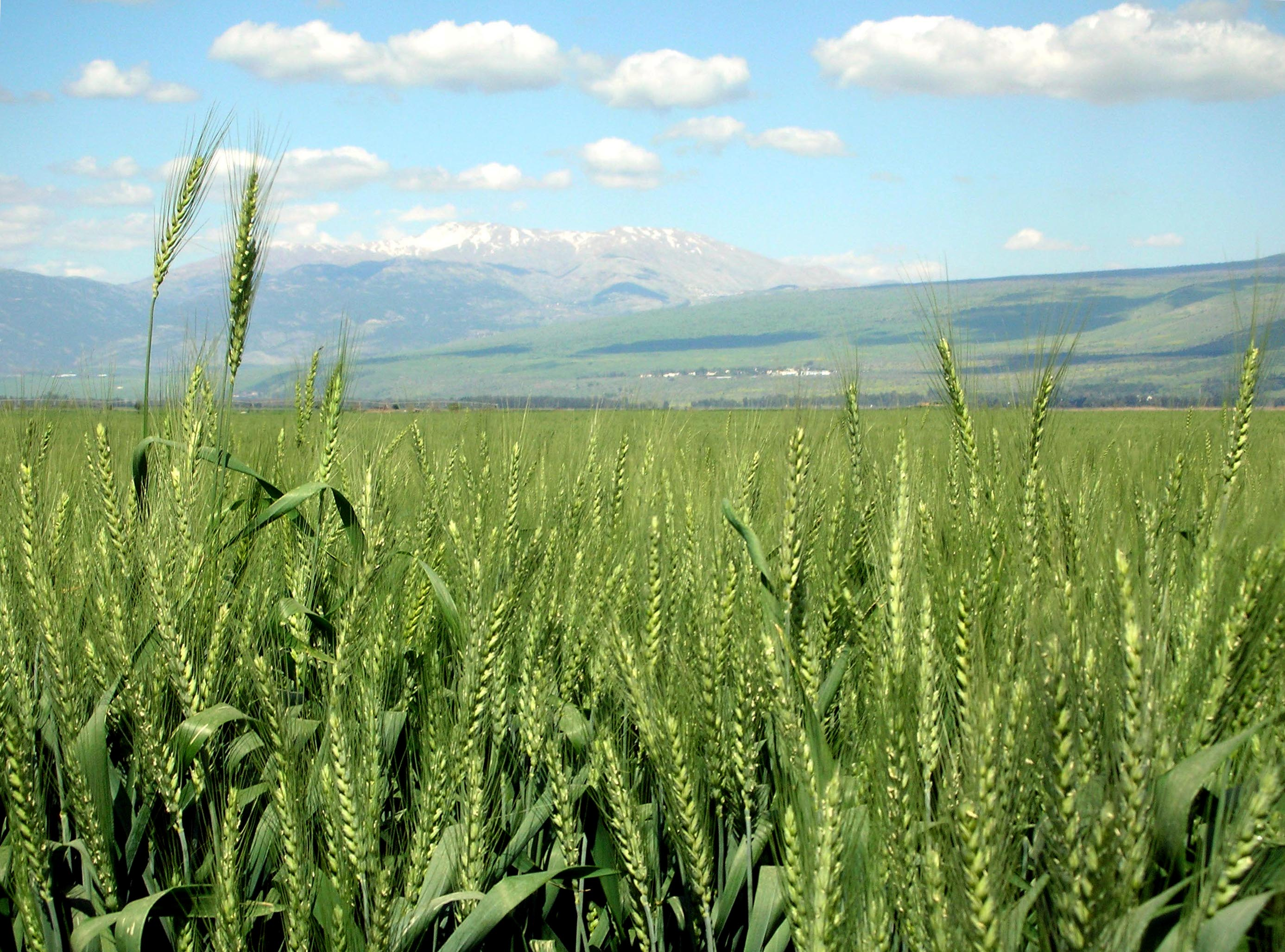
A wheat field in the Hula Valley, against the background of Mount Hermon, March 2007

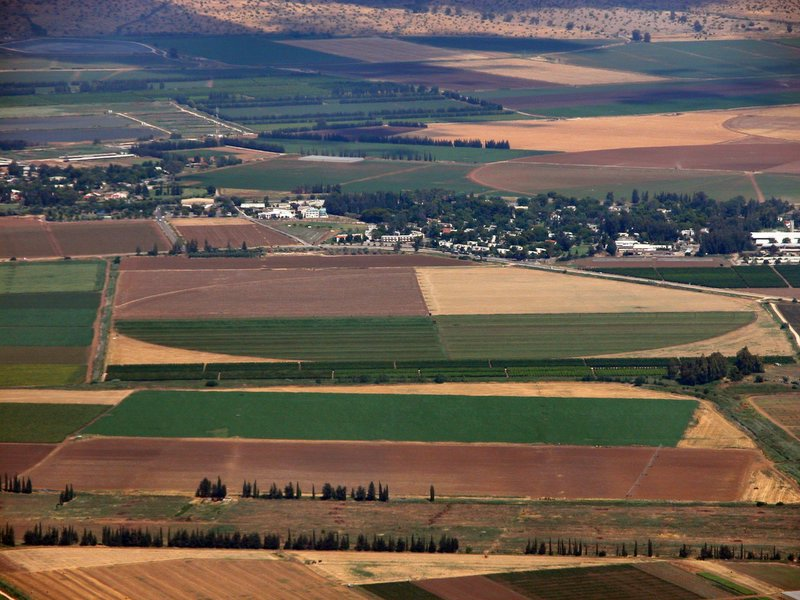
Hula Valley farmland

The Hula Valley (Hebrew: עֵמֶק הַחוּלָה, romanized: ʿEmeq haḤūlā; Arabic: سهل الحولة, romanized: Sahl al-Ḥūlat) is a topographic depression forming a valley and fertile agricultural region in northern Israel with abundant fresh water that used to be part covered by marshland and Lake Hula. These areas were a breeding ground for mosquitoes carrying malaria and were drained in the 1950s by the JNF following the Hula Concession purchase. A small section of the valley was later reflooded in an attempt to revive a nearly extinct ecosystem. It is a major stopover for birds migrating along the Great Rift Valley between Africa, Europe, and Asia, with an estimated 500 million migrating birds now pass through the Hula Valley every year.

== Etymology ==
Different names referred to Lake Hula in the past. In the 1st century, the Jewish-Roman historian Josephus termed it Semechonitis (Greek: Σημεχωνίτις, romanized: Sēmekhonítis). In the Babylonian Talmud, it is called the Lake of Sivekhi (יַמָּהּ שֶׁל סִיבְכִי, Siḇəḵi). Both names have been identified with the placename Šamḫuna found in the Amarna letters written in the Akkadian language c. 1360 BCE.

The Waters of Merom has sometimes been used in scientific literature, although that term refers specifically to springs on the western side of the valley.

Several ancient place names such as Abela, Dan, and Daphne in the upper Hula Valley survived into the Islamic and Ottoman periods through Arabic linguistic adaptation.These findings point to long-term settlement and naming continuity across successive cultural phases in the region.

Several Diocletian boundary stones have been discovered in the valley, preserving the names of otherwise unknown Late Roman villages. Eight of the eleven village names recorded on Diocletianic boundary stones from the valley have been identified using toponymic continuity, archaeological data, and spatial analysis. Among these are Tirthas in Khirbet Turrīthā; Golgol in Juneijil/al-Zūq al-Fawqānī; Beth-Achon in Tell al-Battīkha; Dēra in al-Dawwāra; Osea in al-ʿĀbsiya; and Beth-Anath in a Tell ʿAnt.

== History ==
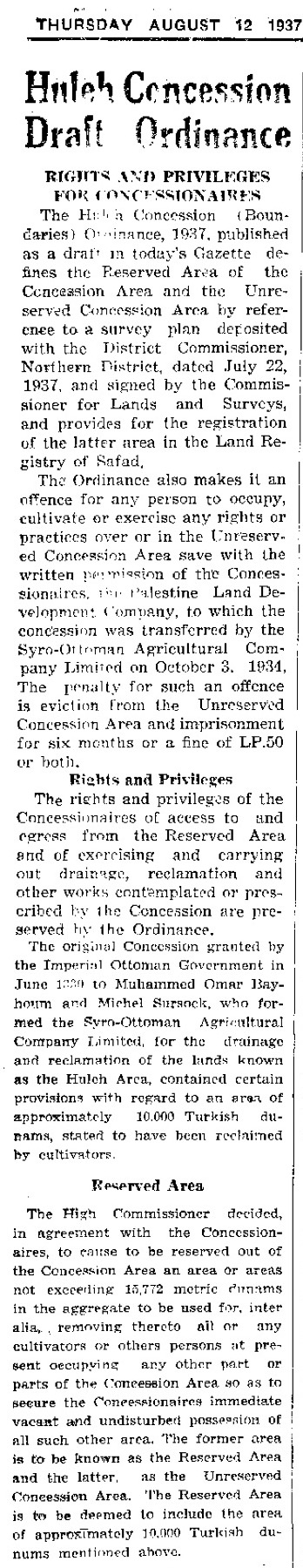
Palestine Post article explaining the history of the Huleh Concession, 12 August 1937

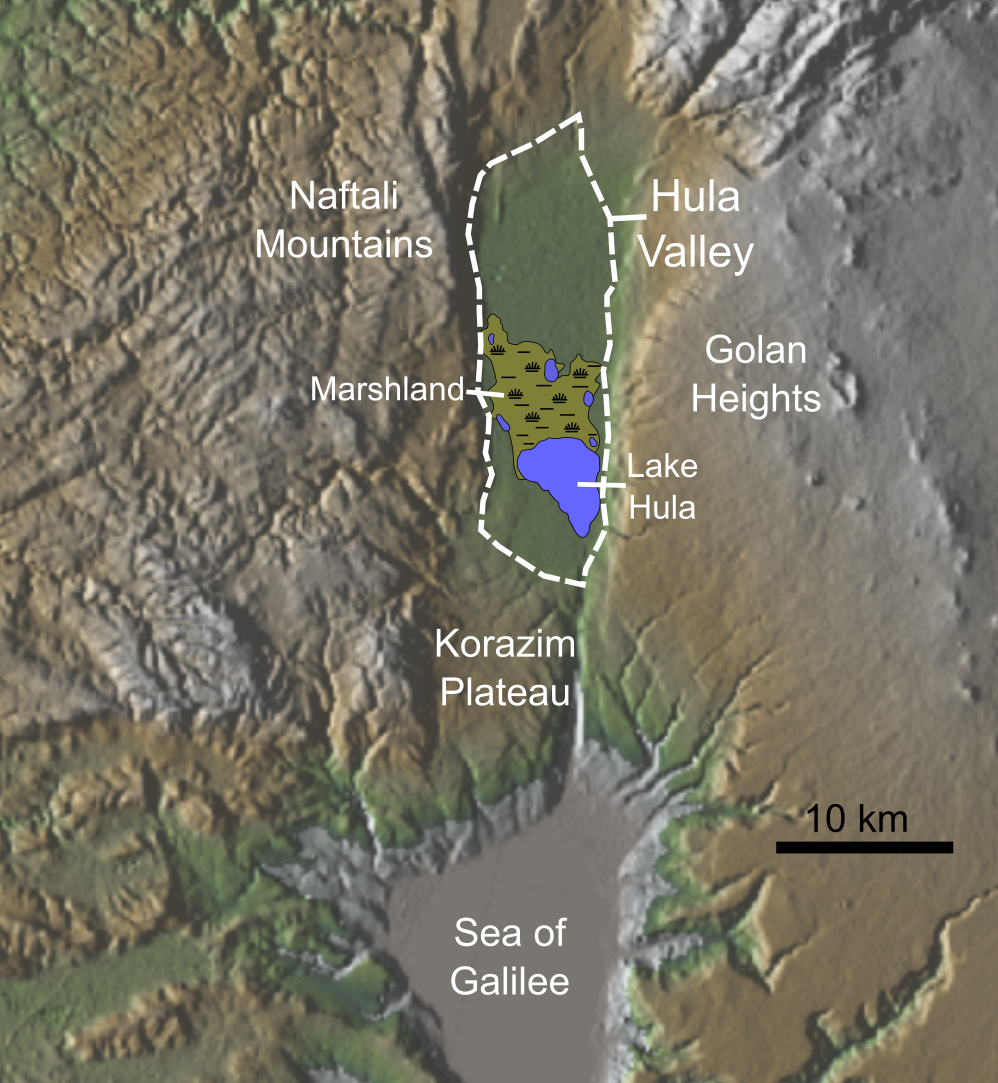
Map of the Hula Valley showing the location of Lake Hula and the marshland area before drainage in the 1950s

Prior to its drainage in the early 1950s, Lake Hula was 5.3 km (3.3 mi) long and 4.4 km (2.7 mi) wide, extending over 12-14 square kilometers. It was about 1.5 m (4 ft 11 in) deep in summer and 3 m (9.8 ft) deep in winter. The marsh-like lake was fed by several perennial springs. The lake attracted human settlement from early prehistoric times. Paleolithic archaeological remains were found near the "Daughters of Jacob Bridge" at the southern end of the valley. The first permanent settlement, Enan (Mallaha), dates from 9,000–10,000 years ago and was discovered in the valley.

The Hula Valley was a main junction on the important trade route connecting the large commercial centre of Damascus with the Eastern Mediterranean coast and Egypt. During the Bronze Age, the cities of Hazor and Laish were built at key locations on this route approximately 4,000 years ago. At some point, the area came under the control of the Israelites, until it was captured by the Neo-Assyrian Empire's armies under Tiglath-Pileser III (reigned 745–727 BC) and its inhabitants were driven away. The Bible records the Waters of Merom, a lake in the valley, as the site of a victory of Joshua over the Canaanites in Joshua 11:5–7.

Throughout the Hellenistic civilization, the Roman Empire, and the Byzantine Empire, and the Umayyad and early Abbasid caliphates (fourth century BCE to eighth centuries CE), rural settlement in the Hula Valley was uninterrupted. During the Seleucid Empire, the town Seleucia Samulias was founded on the lake shore.

Traditional crops were rice (as early as the Hellenistic period), cotton, sugar cane (brought in 636 during the Muslim conquest of Syria) sorghum, and maize (which arrived as part of the Columbian exchange). Water buffalo were first introduced in the eighth century, supplying milk and serving as beasts of burden.

In the 19th century, the valley, mainly marshy ground and a shallow lake, was inhabited by Ghawaraneh Bedouin who wove matting from the papyrus with which they built their homes. John MacGregor, a Victorian adventurer, was captured with his boat, the "Rob Roy", by dark-skinned Bedouin living in the Hula marshes. He was responsible for the first modern maps of the area. Mortality rates were very high due to the spread of malaria. In 1882, a traveler wrote that the region was "among the finest hunting grounds in Syria," home to "panthers, leopards, bears, wild boars, wolves, foxes, jackals, hyenas, gazelles and otters." During World War II, officers of the British Army wrote about hunting birds there.

In 1908, the Ottoman government granted a concession to drain the marsh to a French firm, which sold it to Lebanese businessmen. In 1933, during the British Mandate, the Zionist Palestine Land Development Company was purchased the concession and drew up plans to drain and irrigate the valley which brought scientific expeditions to the area.

A visitor to the area in the 1930s reported that the villages in the area harvested the papyrus for weaving. They used two distinct styles of loom: one for fine mats for interior use, and a second producing longer, coarser mats which were used for constructing huts and shelters.

The first modern Jewish settlement in the Hula Valley, Yesud HaMa'ala on the western shore of the lake, was established in 1883 during the First Aliyah.

In 1948 there were 35 villages in the Hula Valley—12 Jewish and 23 Arab.

== Geography ==
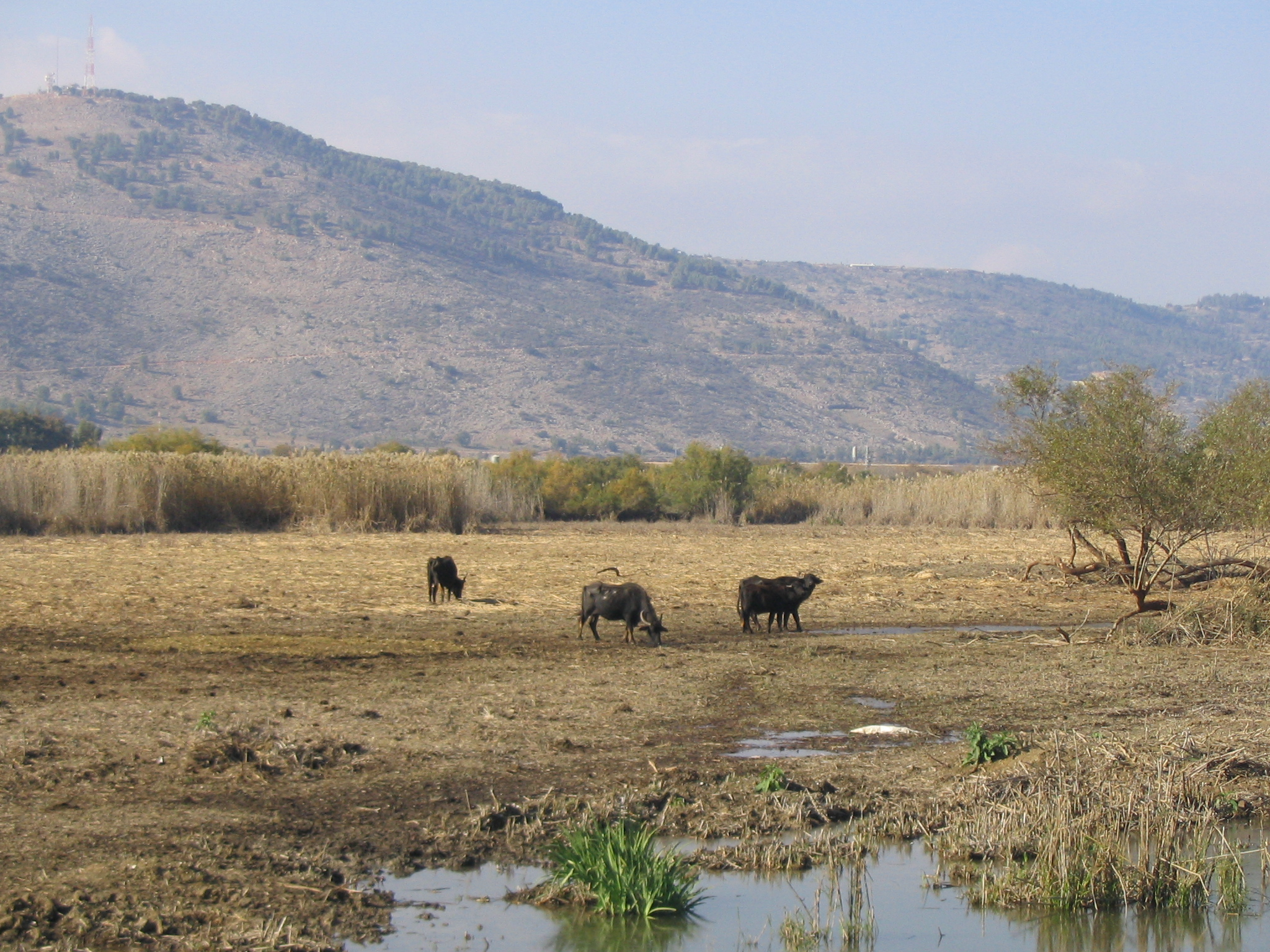
Water buffalo grazing in Hula Valley

The Hula Valley lies within the northern part of the Great Rift Valley at an elevation of about 70 meters above sea level, and covers an area of 177 square kilometers (25 km by 6–8 km). On both sides of the valley are steep slopes: the Golan Heights to the east and the Upper Galilee's Naftali Mountains to the west rise to 400 to 900 meters above sea level. Basalt hills of about 200 meters above sea level along the southern side of the valley intercept the Jordan River, and are commonly referred to as the basalt "plug", the Korazim block, or Korazim Plateau (actually a temporary geologic base level), as they restrict water drainage downstream into the Sea of Galilee.

=== Climate ===
The Hula Valley has a Mediterranean climate of hot dry summers and cool rainy winters, although its enclosure within two mountain ranges leads to more extreme seasonal and daily temperature fluctuations than in coastal areas. Annual rainfall varies greatly between different parts of the valley and ranges from about 400 millimeters in the south of the valley, to up to 800 millimeters in the north of the valley. More than 1,500 millimeters of precipitation falls on the Anti-Lebanon Mountains only a few kilometers north of the valley, mostly in the form of snow, feeding underground springs and the sources of the Jordan River including the Hasbani River, Banias River, Dan River and the el-Malaha Brook, all eventually flowing through the valley, and which, before its drainage, could not easily be distinguished because of the marsh.

== Wetland environment ==
G. Schumacher, visiting the region in 1883, described the Hula valley in the following terms:

Ard el Huleh. The whole country of the marshes of the Huleh Lake, a swampy territory thickly overgrown with papyrus. It abounds in snipe, wild ducks, francolins and many other kinds of birds, and is consequently much resorted to by the hunter, but as carefully avoided by the inhabitants on account of the noxious fever.

=== Swamp drainage ===
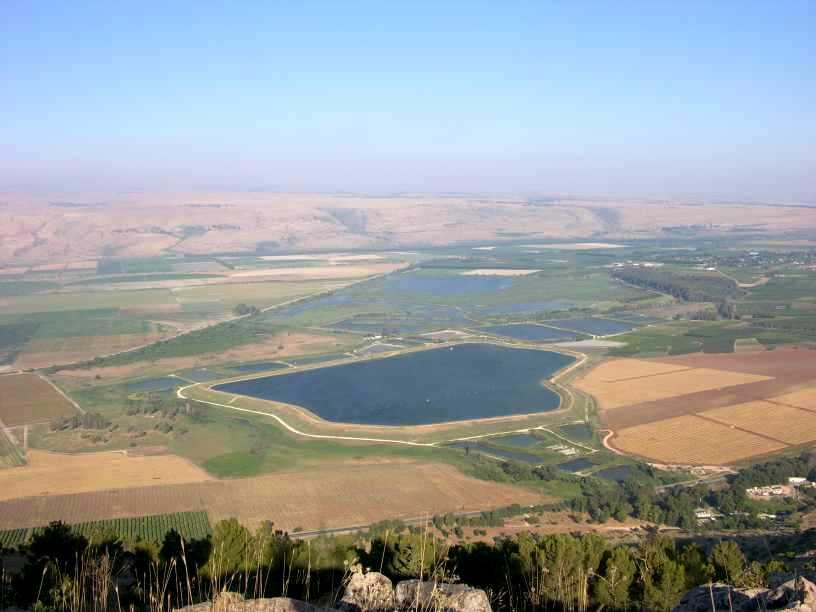
View of the Hula national reserve from Keren Naftali

The draining operations, carried out by the Jewish National Fund (JNF), began in 1951 and were completed by 1958. In 1955 the Israeli government invited John Zuckerman to visit Israel as advisor on a project. It was achieved by two main engineering operations: the deepening and widening of the Jordan River downstream; and two newly-dug peripheral canals diverting the Jordan at the north of the valley. The drying out caused the extinction or extirpation of the unique endemic or near-endemic fauna of the lake, including the cyprinid fish Mirogrex hulensis or Hula bream, the nemacheilid fish Nun galilaeus or Galilean stone loach, and the cichlid fish Tristramella intermedia or Hulan shortjaw tristramella.

Though perceived at the time as a great national achievement for Israel, with the advent of the modern environmental movement, it became evident that the transformation of the swamp into agricultural land involved significant trade-offs and had effects on the ecosystem that had not been perceived in the first half of the twentieth century, when the major concerns had been the reduction of malaria-bearing mosquitoes and improving economic productivity. In 1963, a small (3.50 km^{2}) area of recreated papyrus swampland in the southwest of the valley was set aside as the country's first nature reserve. Concern over the draining of the Hula was the impetus for the creation of the Society for the Protection of Nature in Israel.

Draining the Hula turned out to be a mixed blessing. Water polluted with chemical fertilizers began flowing into the Sea of Galilee, lowering the quality of its water. The soil, stripped of natural foliage, was blown away by strong winds in the valley, and the peat of the drained swamp ignited spontaneously, causing underground fires that were difficult to extinguish. Eventually part of the valley was transformed back into a wetland habitat.

=== Hula Nature Reserve ===
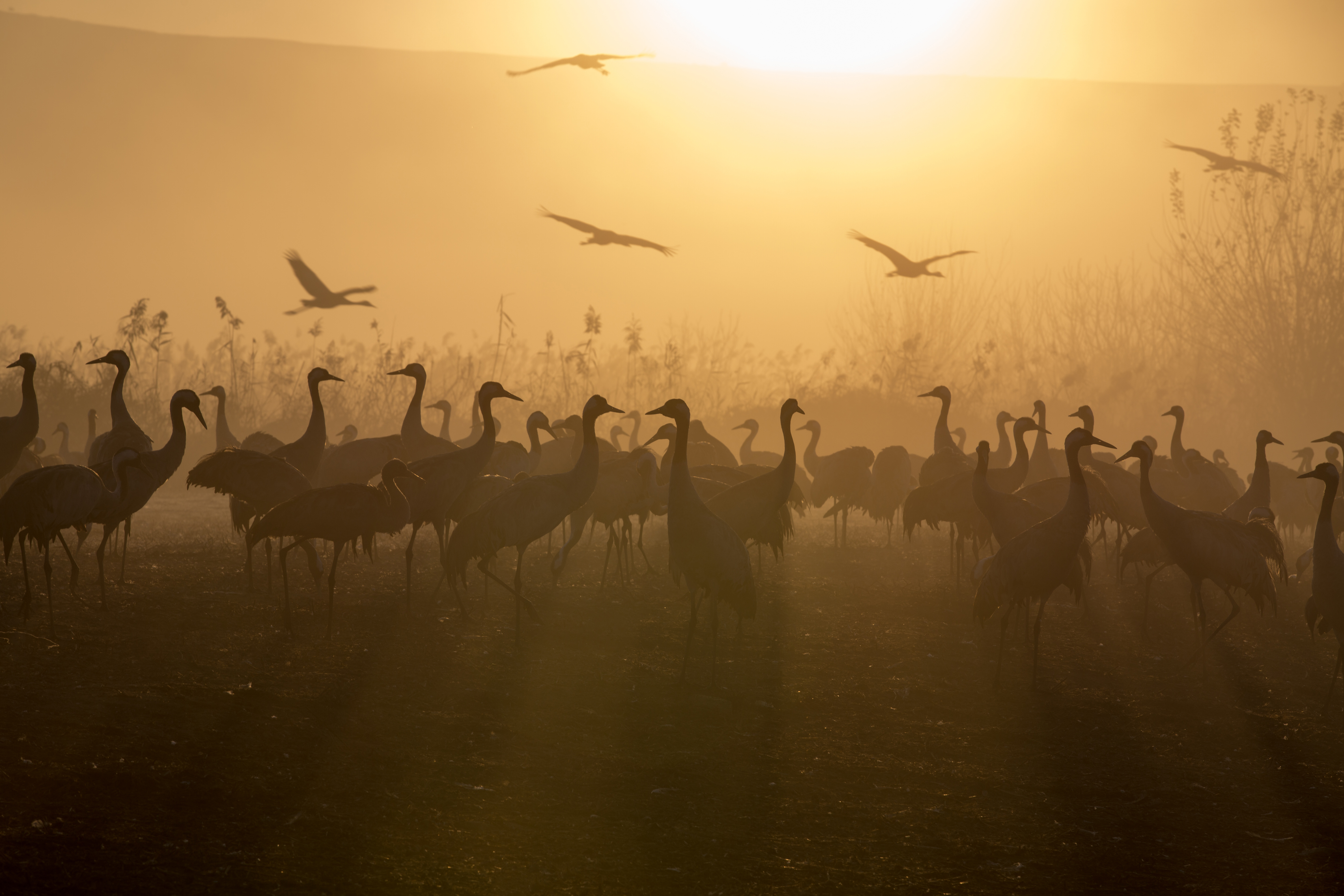
Common cranes in Agamon Hula Nature reserve

The work of a number of scientists and nature lovers made it possible for at least a small part of Hula's wetlands to be preserved. In 1964 the Hula Nature Reserve was officially inaugurated. The Hula Nature Reserve is listed by the Ramsar Convention on Wetlands, as a Wetland of International Importance.

=== Hula Lake Park ===
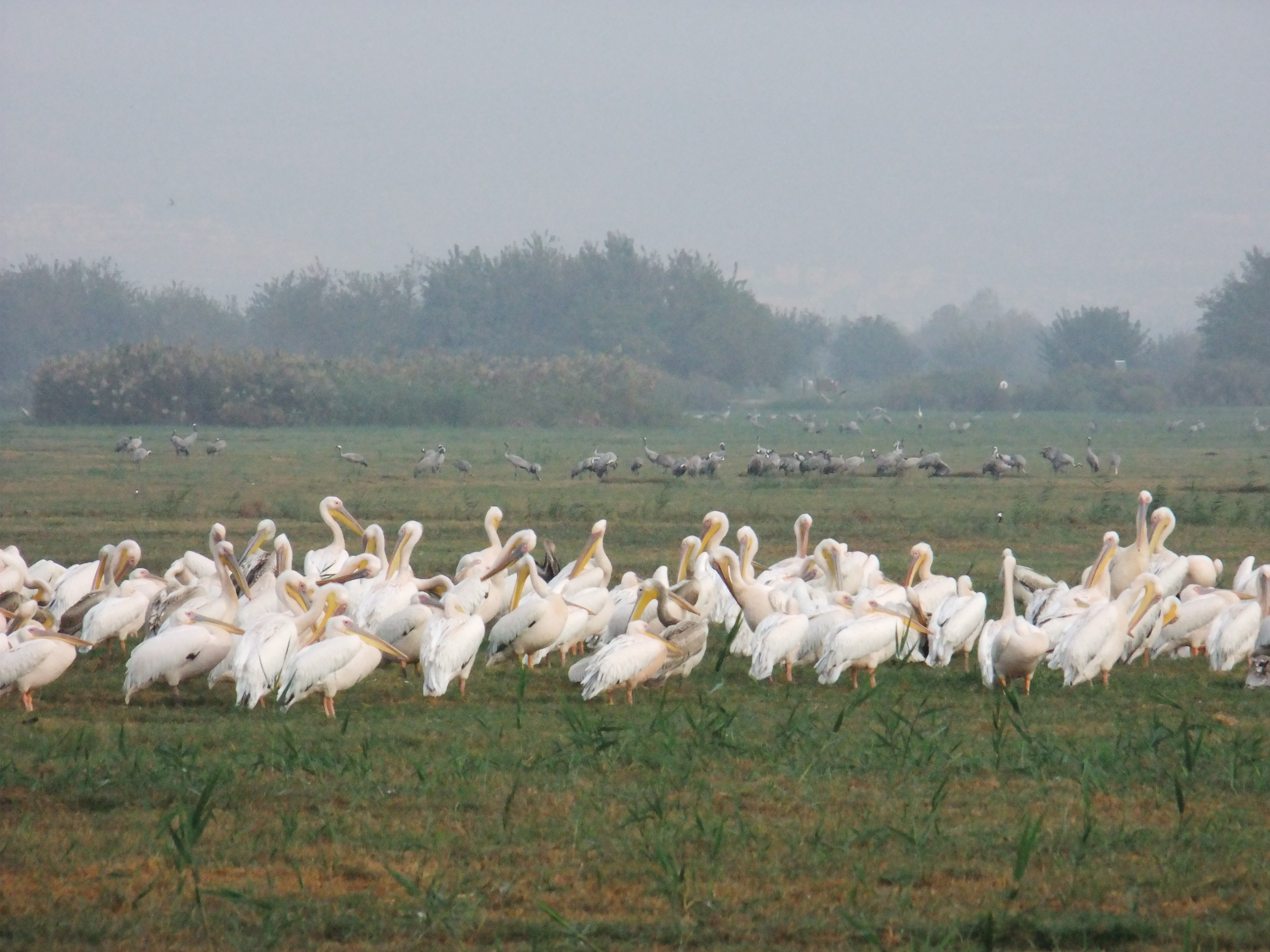
Flocks of pelicans and cranes on migration

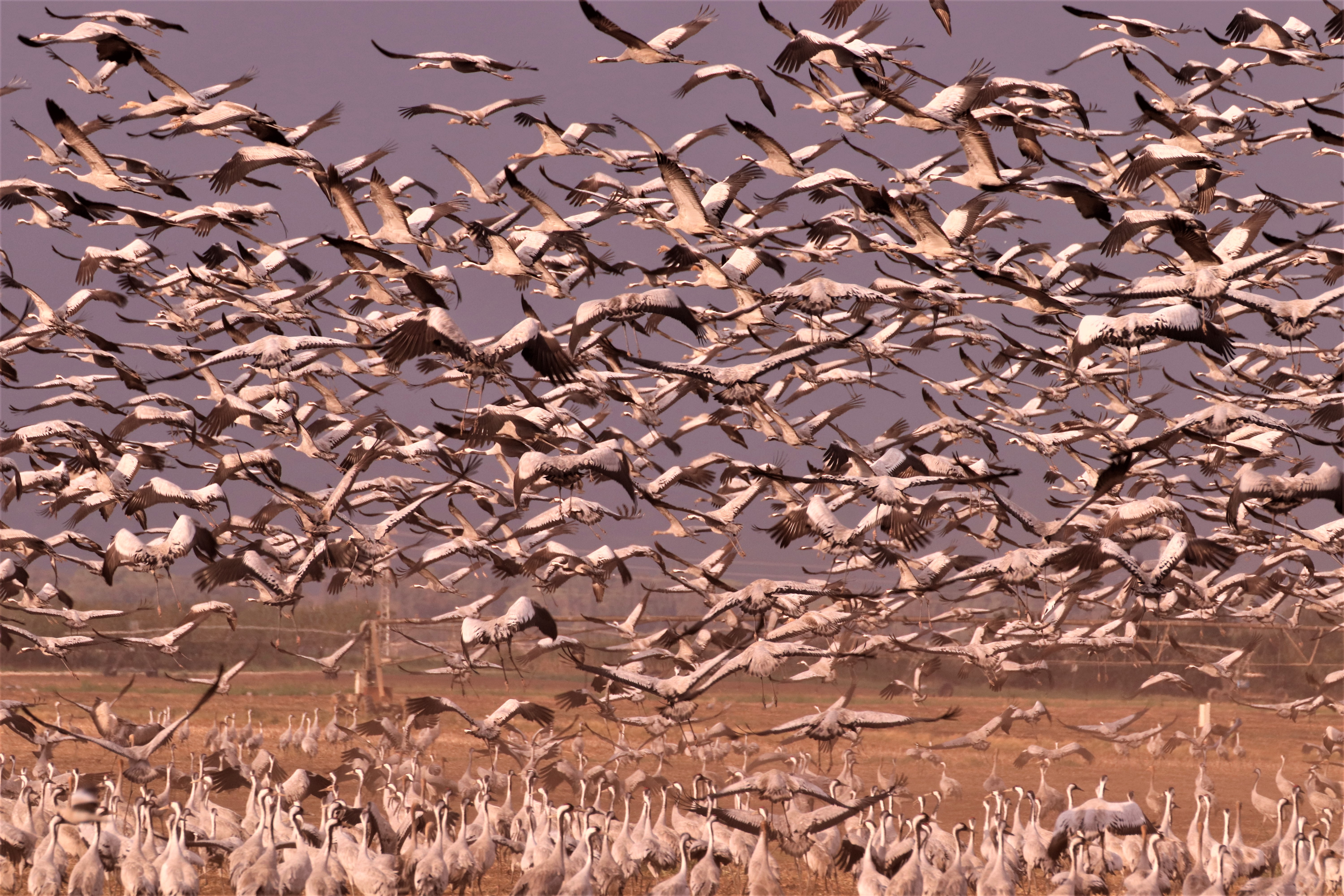
Gathering of common cranes

Hula Lake Park is located in the southern part of the Hula Valley, north of the nature reserve and distinct from it. It was established as part of a JNF rehabilitation project. In the early 1990s part of the valley was flooded again in the wake of heavy rains. It was decided to develop the surrounding area and leave the flooded area intact. The new site has become the second home for thousands of migrating birds in the autumn and spring. The lake covers an area of one square kilometer, interspersed with islands that serve as protected bird nesting sites. It has become a major stopover for migrating birds flying from Europe to Africa and back, and also a major birdwatching site. In 2011, Israeli ornithologists confirmed that Lake Hula is the stopover point for tens of thousands of cranes migrating from Finland to Ethiopia every winter. In Israel, farmers set out food for them to keep them from damaging crops near the lake.

=== Important Bird Area ===
Some 24,000 ha of the northern Hula Valley, including the nature reserve, has been recognised as an Important Bird Area (IBA) by BirdLife International because it supports populations of many species of birds, especially raptors and waterbirds, either as breeding residents, winter visitors or passage migrants. These include marbled teals, pygmy cormorants, sociable lapwings, European honey buzzards, greater and lesser spotted eagles, eastern imperial eagles, Levant sparrowhawks, lesser kestrels and Dead Sea sparrows.

=== Return of Hula painted frog ===
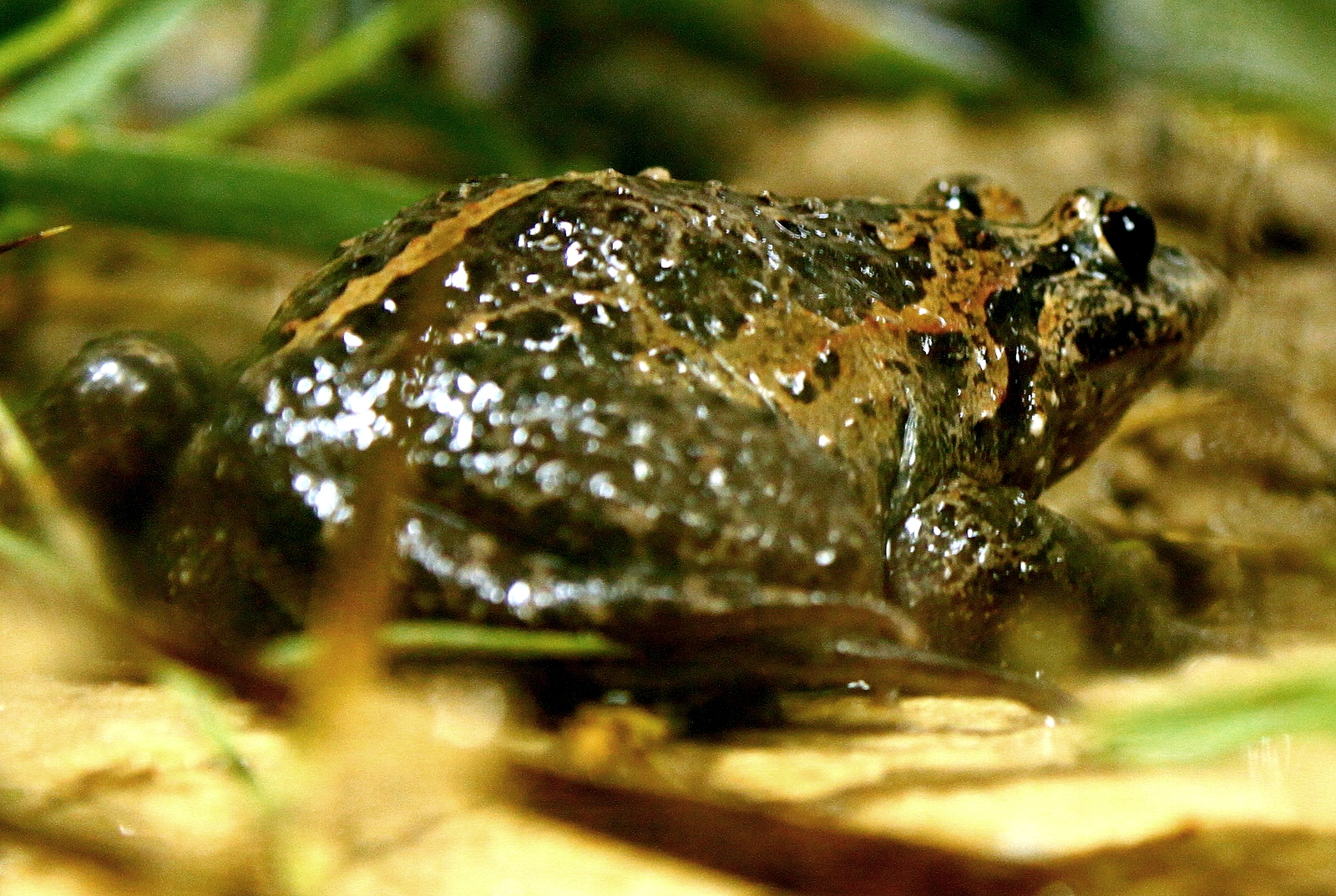
Female of the Critically Endangered Hula painted frog

In November 2011 the Hula painted frog, classified as extinct since 1996 by the IUCN as a result of the marsh drainage, reappeared to park patrollers in HaHula. The reappearance was confirmed by the Israel Nature and Parks Authority. Since the discovery of the first specimen at least ten more have been found, all in the same area. The IUCN has accordingly reclassified the species as critically endangered.

== Archaeology ==
Archaeological findings from 2009 indicate that hominids inhabiting the area exploited the fish of Lake Hula. Analysis of the fish remains recovered from the archaeological site of the Daughters of Jacob Bridge has shown that they exploited a wide range of fish, including catfish, tilapia and carp. Some of the carp were over a meter long. Tools to light fires and crack nuts were also discovered at the site.

== Cultural references ==
In December 2007 Israel issued a set of three stamps featuring the Hula nature reserve.

In 2014, as the last of a planned three-year series of Nature Views coins, Israel commemorated the 50th anniversary of the Hula nature preserve with silver 1 new sheqel and 2 new sheqalim, and gold 10 new sheqalim. These portray a crane with aquatic plants.

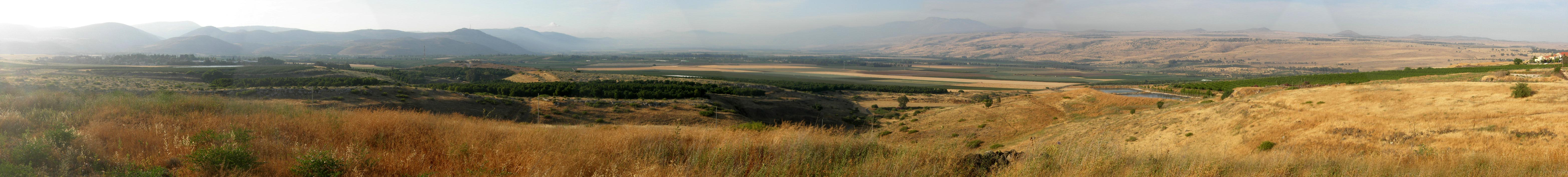
View of the Hula Valley from the south

== Gallery ==
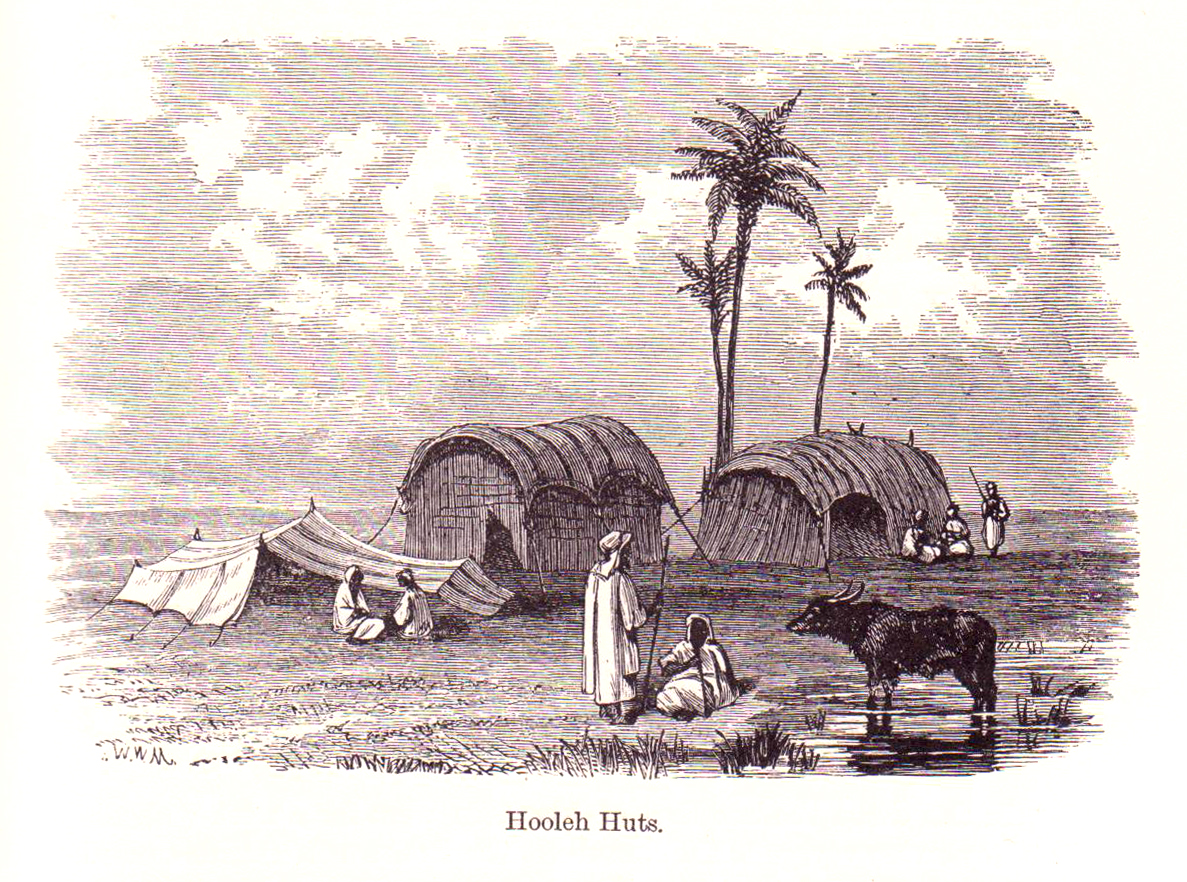
Buildings c. 1885

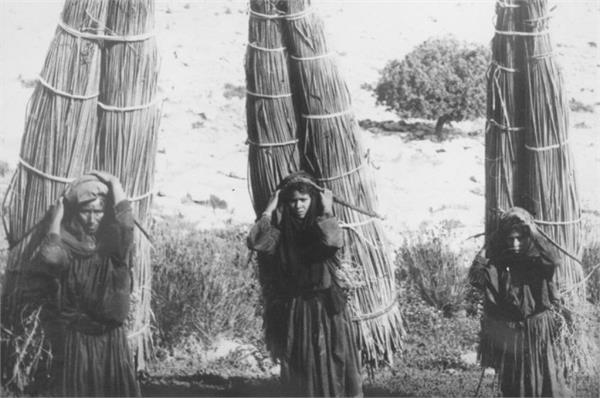
Hula. Papyrus harvest 1920

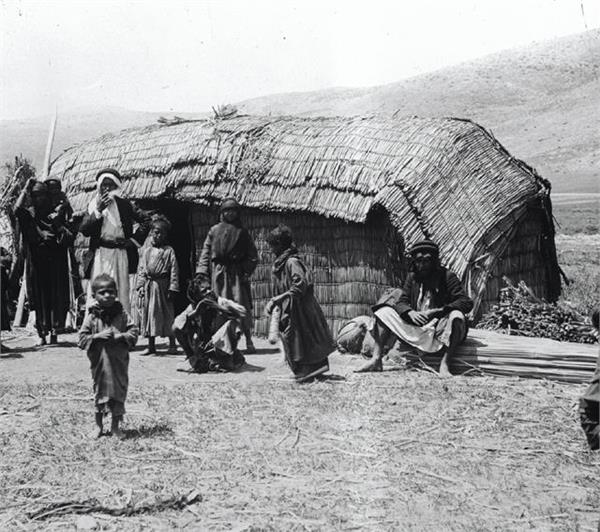
Hula. Reed house 1920

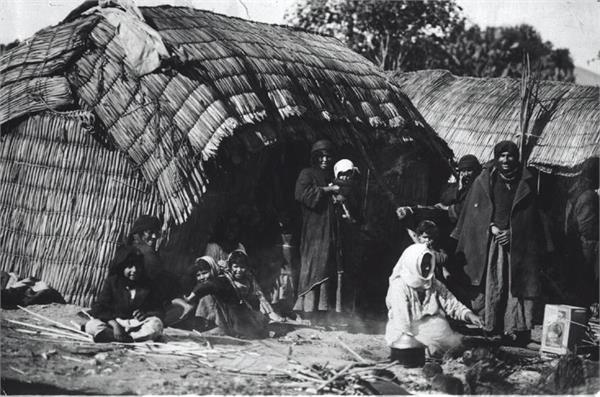
Hula. Reed house 1920

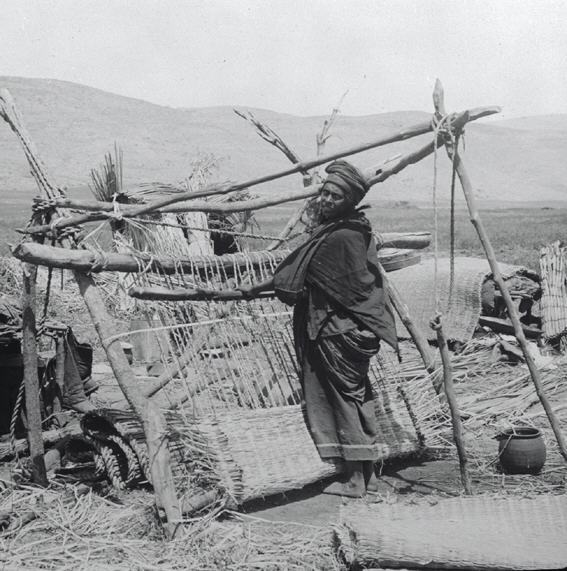
Hula. Mat weaving 1925

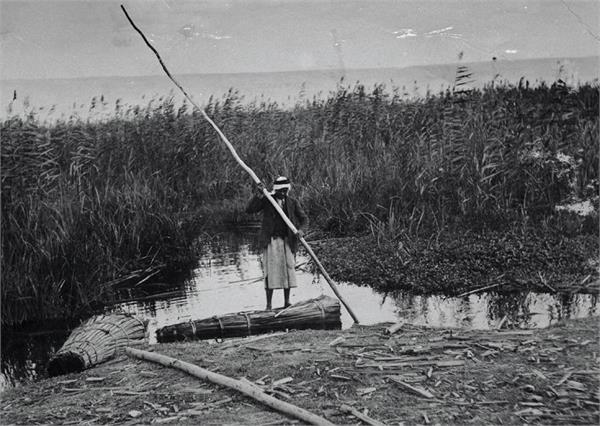
Papyrus raft 1926

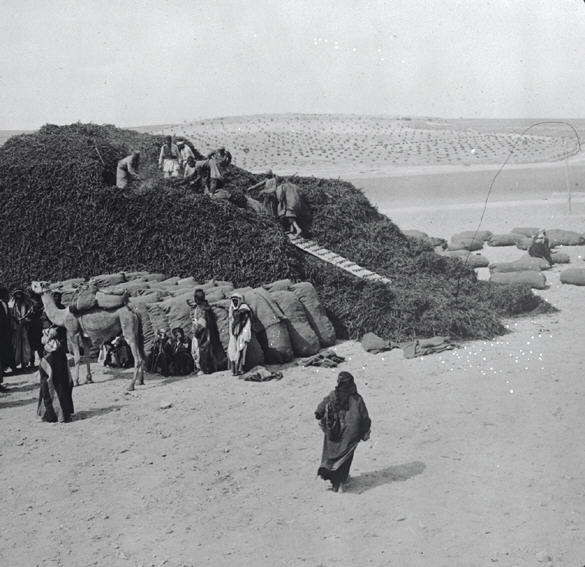
Hula. Cotton harvest 1930

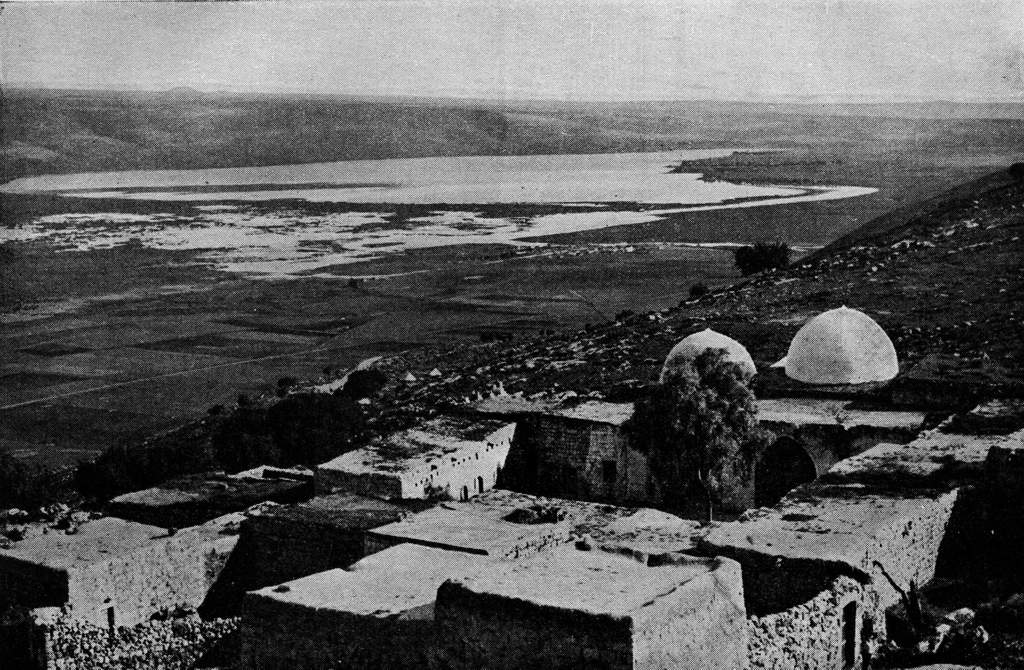
View from Al-Nabi Yusha' 1930s

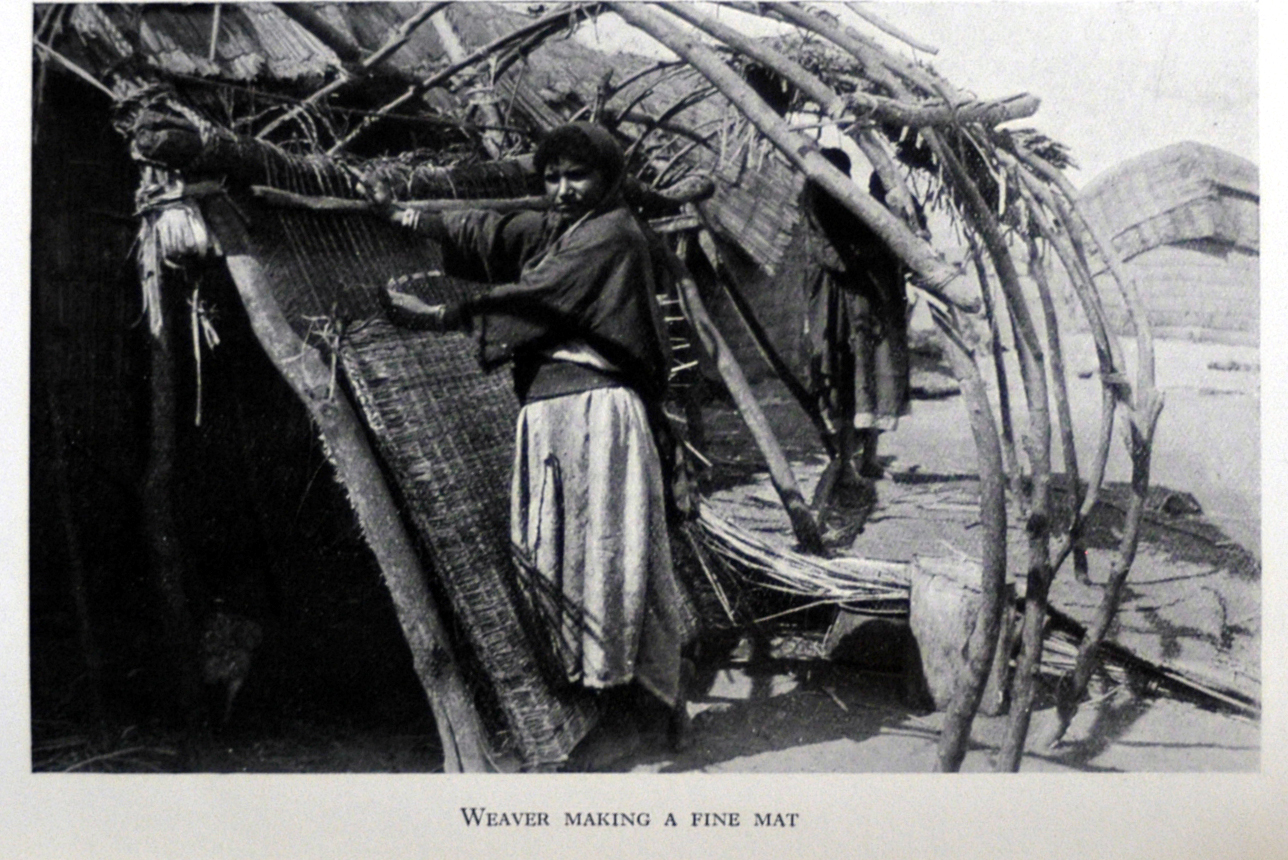
Al-Salihiyya c. 1936. Woman weaving papyrus mat

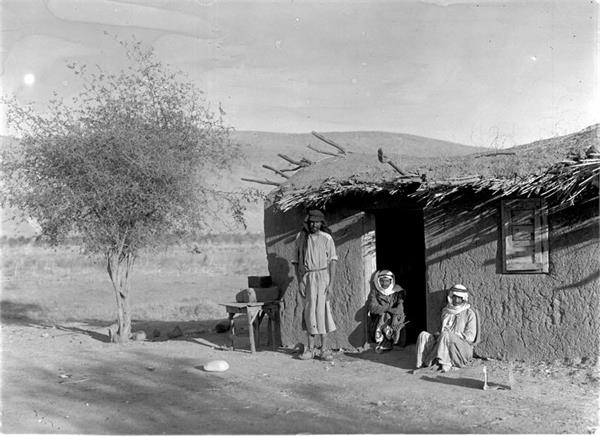
Hula bedouin 1938

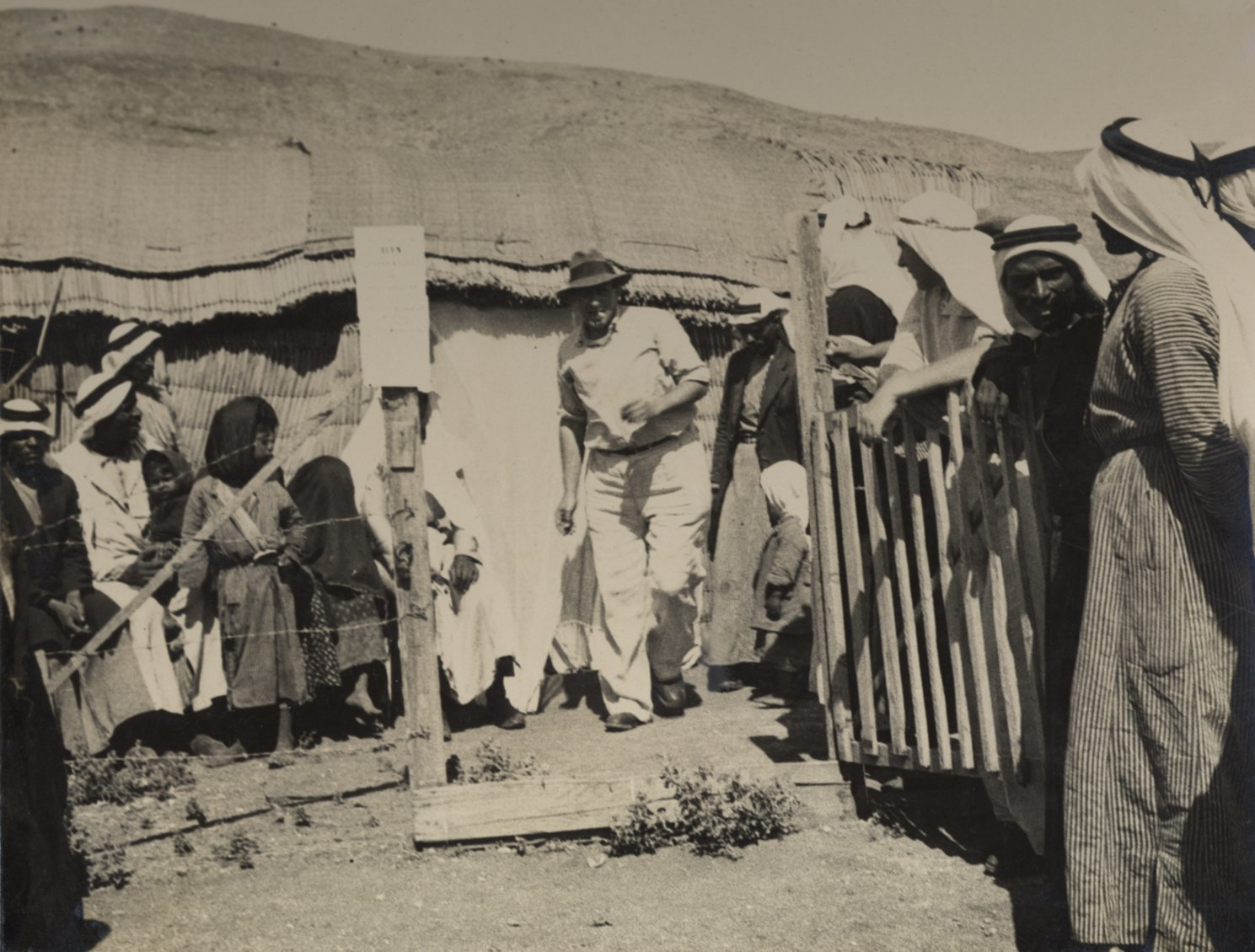
Malaria clinic, 1938
(Dr. Gideon Mer in the centre with hat)

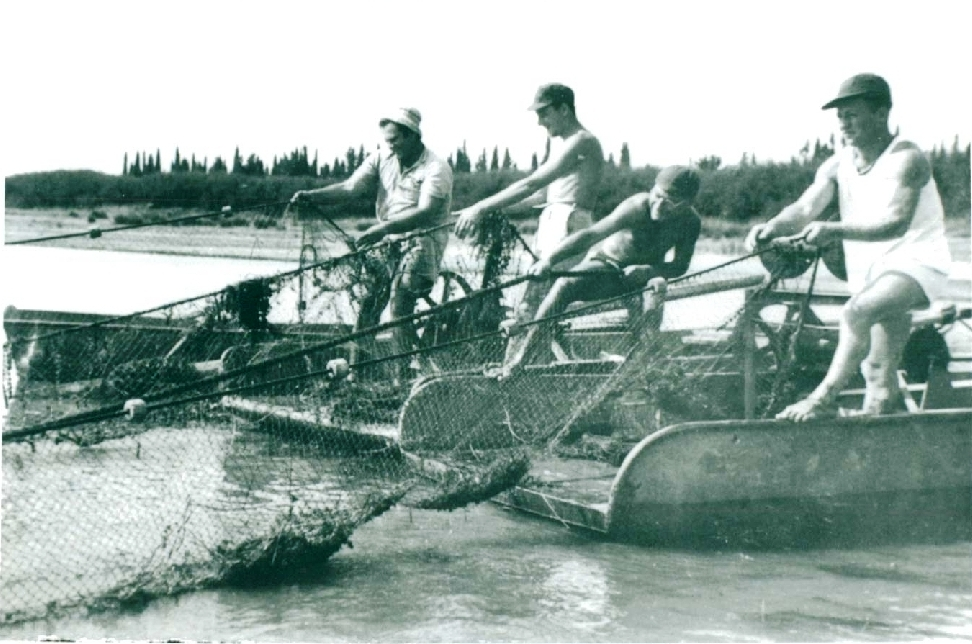
Fishermen at Lake Hula
ca. 1943

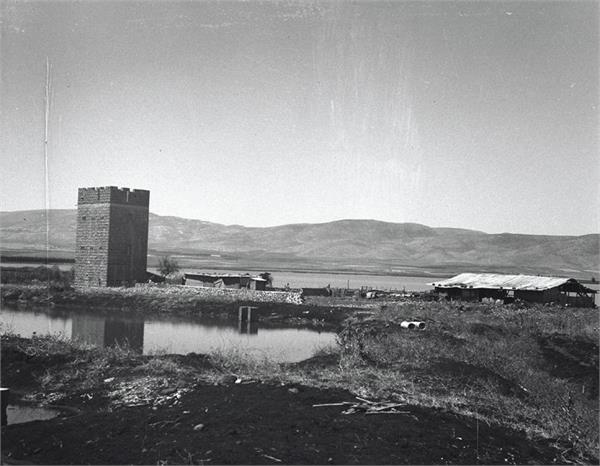
Dederra, 1944 – only Zionist outpost on eastern side of Hula; used by the Palmach for smuggling immigrants

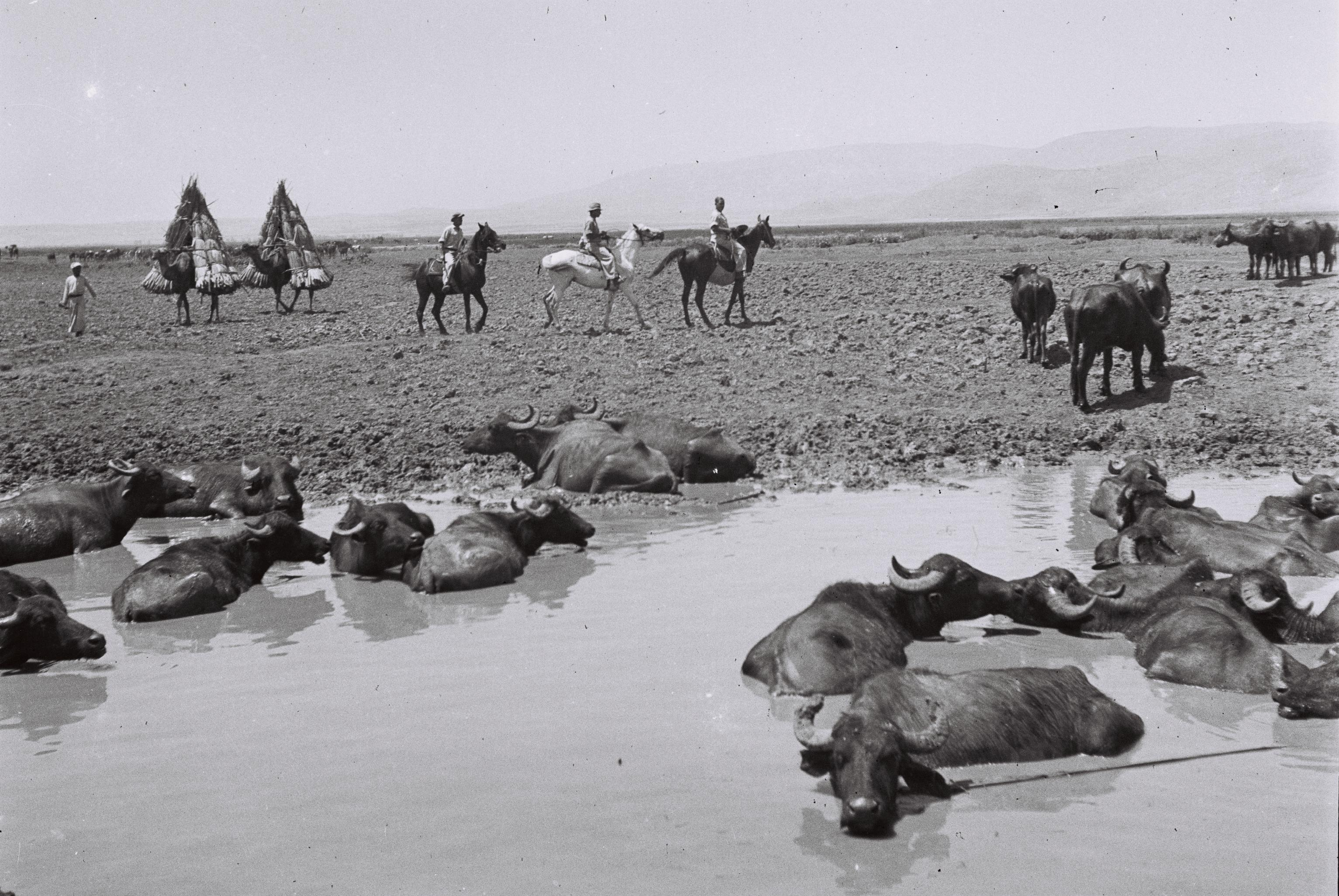
Buffalo soaking in a mud hole, 1946

== See also ==
- Battle of Lake Huleh (1157)
- Battle of Lake Huleh (1771)
- Hula basin
- Museum of Prehistory of the Hulah Valley
- Mirogrex hulensis
- Tristramella intermedia
