= Portrait =

Artistic representation of one or more persons

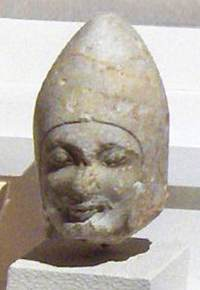
Portrait of an Achaemenid Satrap of Asia Minor (the Herakleia head, from Heraclea, in Bithynia), end of 6th century BCE. This is an Eastern portrait in purely East Greek Archaic style, one of the two known forerunners of extant Greek portraits, along with the Sabouroff head.

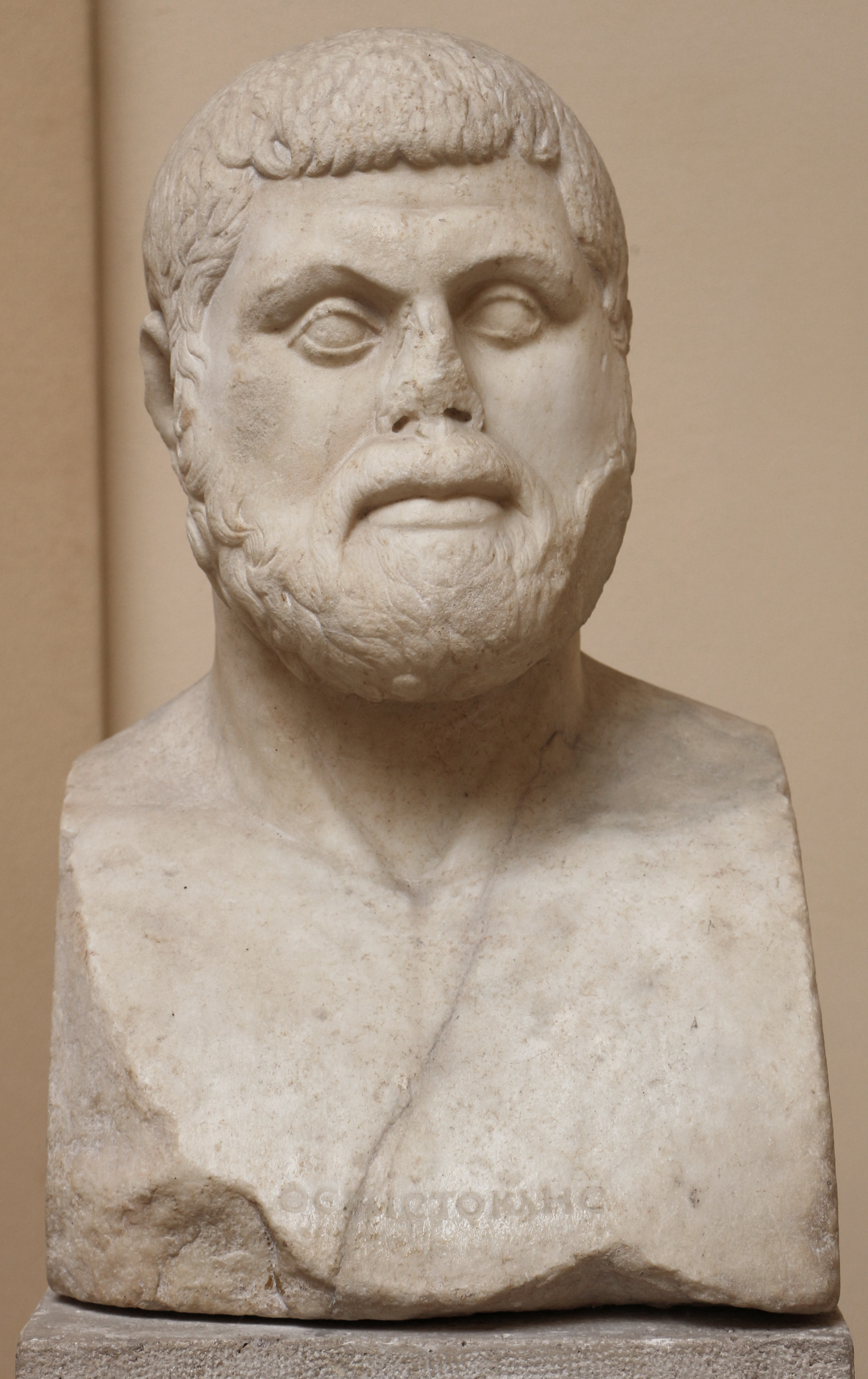
A Roman bust of the Athenian General Themistocles, based on a Greek original. The lost original of this bust, dated c. 470 BCE, has been described as "the first true portrait of an individual European".

The Mona Lisa, a painting by Leonardo da Vinci of Lisa Gherardini, is the world's most famous portrait.

A portrait is a painting, photograph, sculpture, or other artistic representation of a person, in which the face is always predominant. In arts, a portrait may be represented as half body and even full body. If the subject in full body better represents personality and mood, this type of presentation may be chosen. The intent is to display the likeness, personality, and even the mood of the person. For this reason, in photography a portrait is generally not a snapshot, but a composed image of a person in a still position. A portrait often shows a person looking directly at the painter or photographer, to most successfully engage the subject with the viewer, but portrait may be represented as a profile (from aside) and 3/4.

== History ==
=== Prehistorical portraiture ===
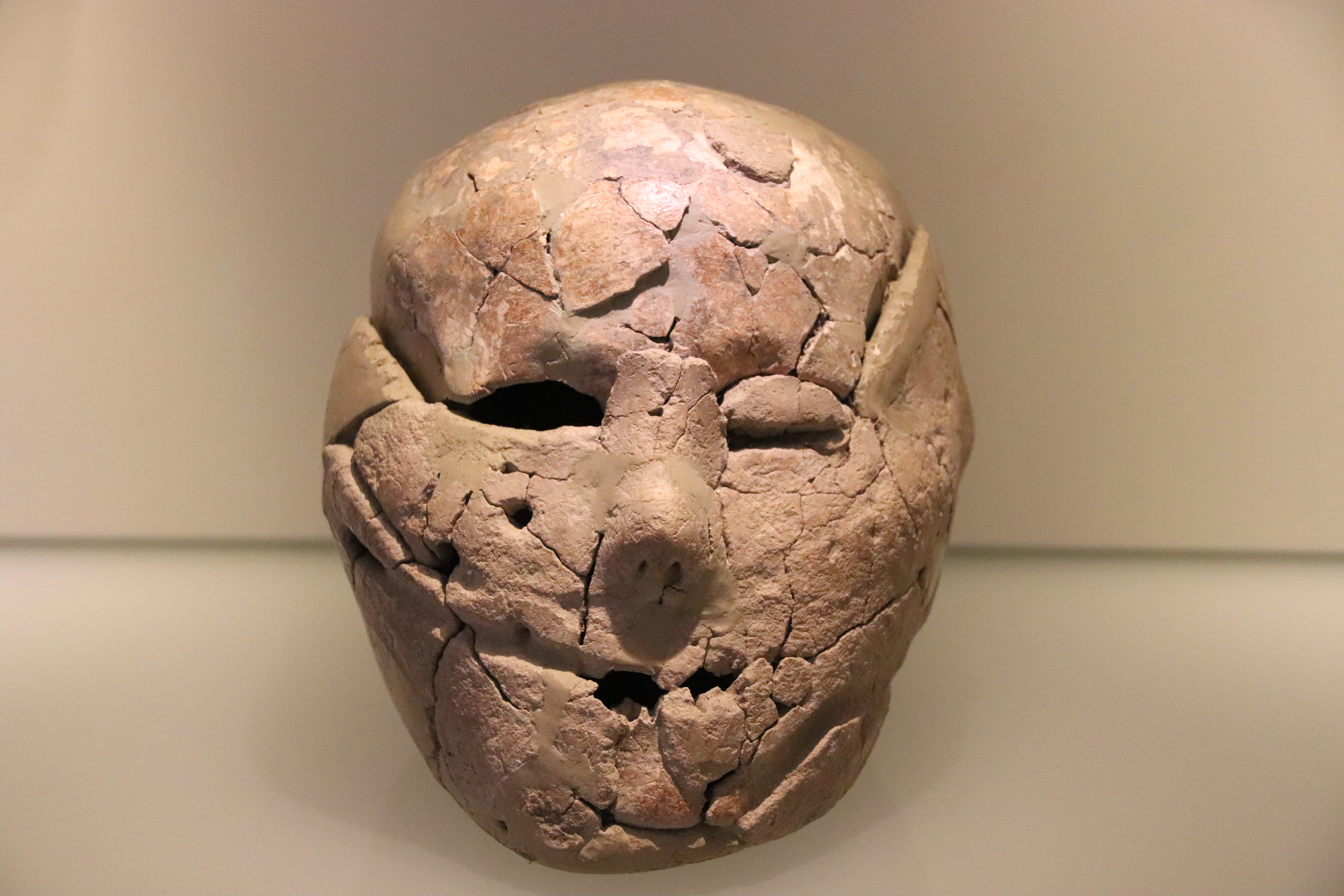
Plastered skull, Baysamun, Pre-Pottery Neolithic B, c. 9000 BC

Plastered human skulls were reconstructed human skulls that were made in the ancient Levant between 9000 and 6000 BC in the Pre-Pottery Neolithic B period. They represent some of the oldest forms of art in the Middle East and demonstrate that the prehistoric population took great care in burying their ancestors below their homes. The skulls denote some of the earliest sculptural examples of portraiture in the history of art.

=== Historical portraiture ===
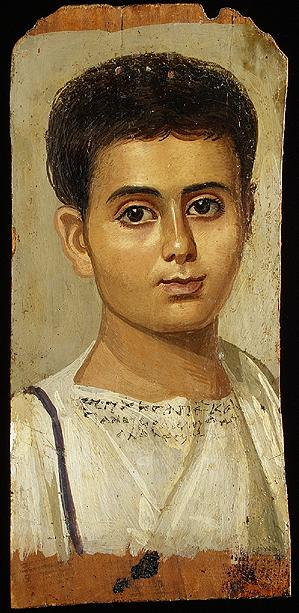
Roman-Egyptian funeral portrait of a young boy

Most early representations that are clearly intended to show an individual are of rulers, and tend to follow idealizing artistic conventions, rather than the individual features of the subject's body, although when there is no other evidence as to the ruler's appearance the degree of idealization may be hard to assess. Nonetheless, many subjects, such as Akhenaten and some other Egyptian pharaohs, may be recognised by their distinctive features. The 28 surviving rather small statues of Gudea, ruler of Lagash in Sumer between c. 2144–2124 BC, show a consistent appearance with some individuality, although it is sometimes disputed that these count as portraits.

Some of the earliest surviving painted portraits of people who were not rulers are the Greco-Roman funeral portraits that survived in the dry climate of Egypt's Faiyum district. These are almost the only paintings from the classical world that have survived, apart from frescos, although many sculptures and portraits on coins have fared better. Although the appearance of the figures differs considerably, they are considerably idealized, and all show relatively young people, making it uncertain whether they were painted from life.

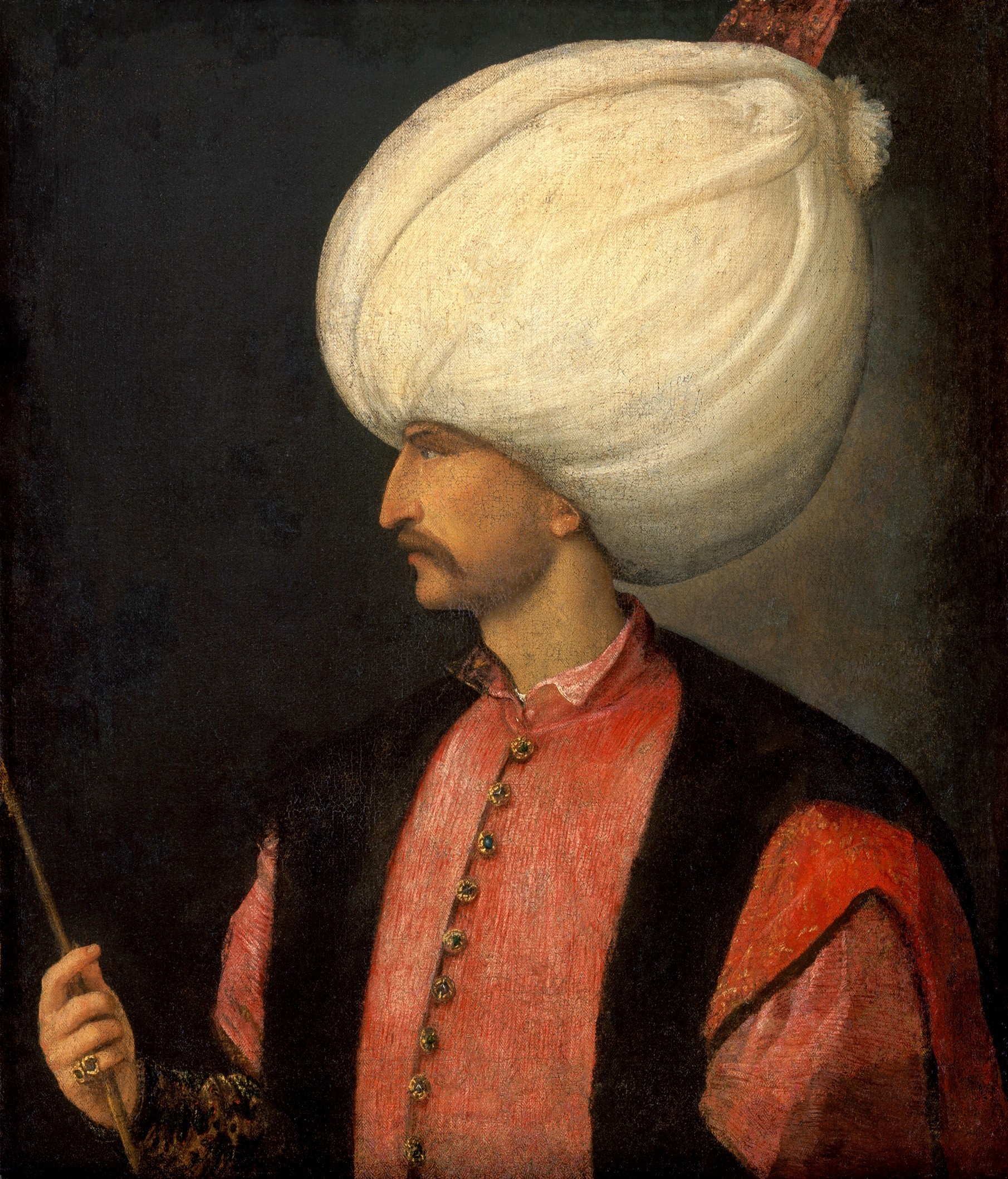
Sultan Suleiman the Magnificent of the Ottoman Empire

The art of the portrait flourished in Ancient Greek and especially Roman sculpture, where sitters demanded individualized and realistic portraits, even unflattering ones. During the fourth century, the portrait began to retreat in favor of an idealized symbol of what that person looked like. (Compare the portraits of Roman Emperors Constantine I and Theodosius I at their entries.) In the Europe of the Early Middle Ages representations of individuals are mostly generalized. True portraits of the outward appearance of individuals re-emerged in the late Middle Ages, in tomb monuments, donor portraits, miniatures in illuminated manuscripts, and then panel paintings.

Moche culture of Peru was one of the few ancient civilizations which produced portraits. These works accurately represent anatomical features in great detail. The individuals portrayed would have been recognizable without the need for other symbols or a written reference to their names. The individuals portrayed were members of the ruling elite, priests, warriors, and even distinguished artisans. They were represented during several stages of their lives. The faces of deities were also depicted. There is particular emphasis on the representation of the details of headdresses, hairstyles, body adornment (jewellery, clothing), and face painting.

One of the best-known portraits in the Western world is Leonardo da Vinci's painting entitled Mona Lisa, which is a painting of Lisa del Giocondo. What has been claimed as the world's oldest known portrait was found in 2006 in the Vilhonneur grotto near Angoulême and is thought to be 27,000 years old.

== Self-portraiture ==
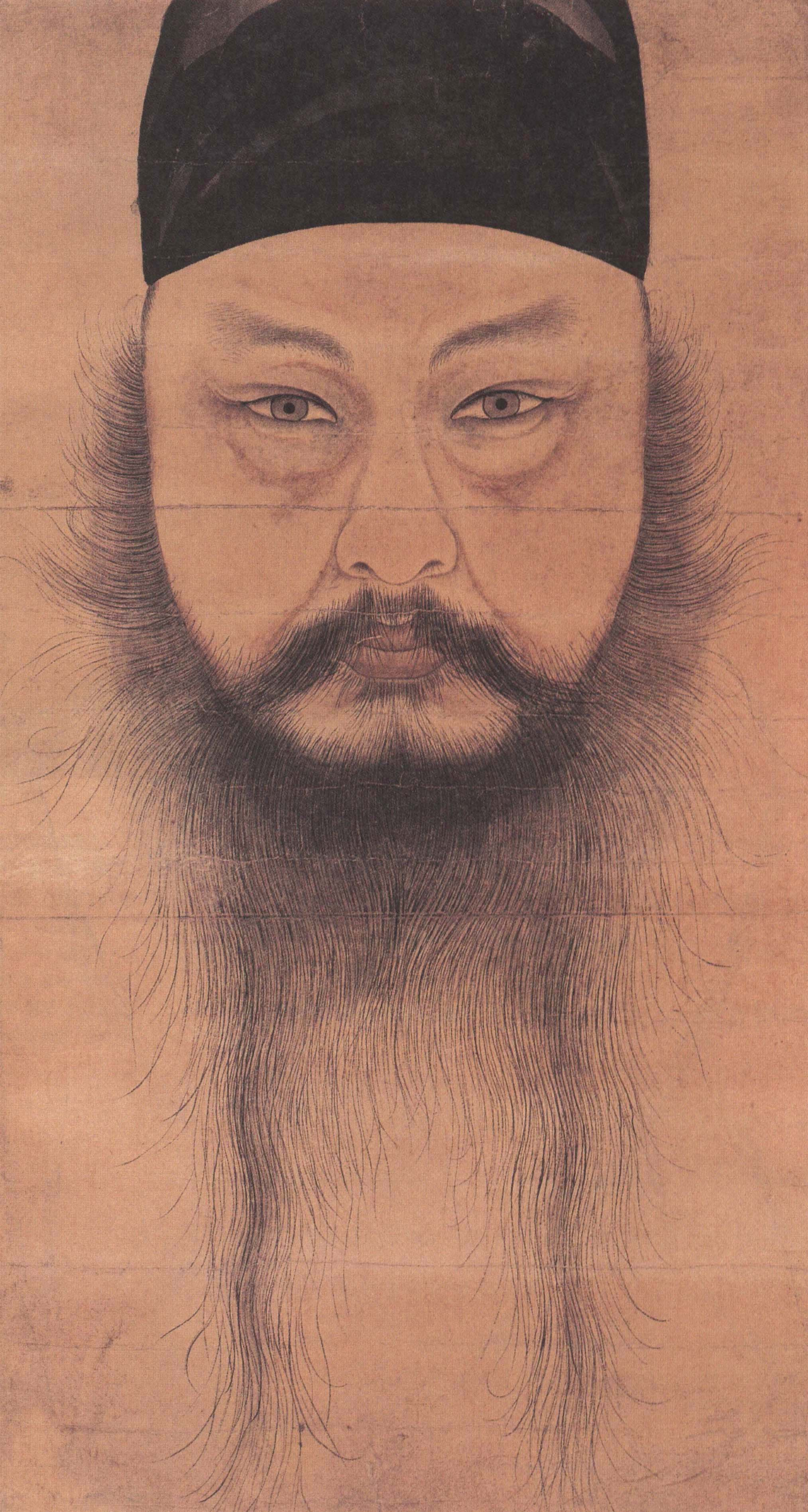
Self-portrait by Yun Tusŏ, 1710, South Korea (Joseon)

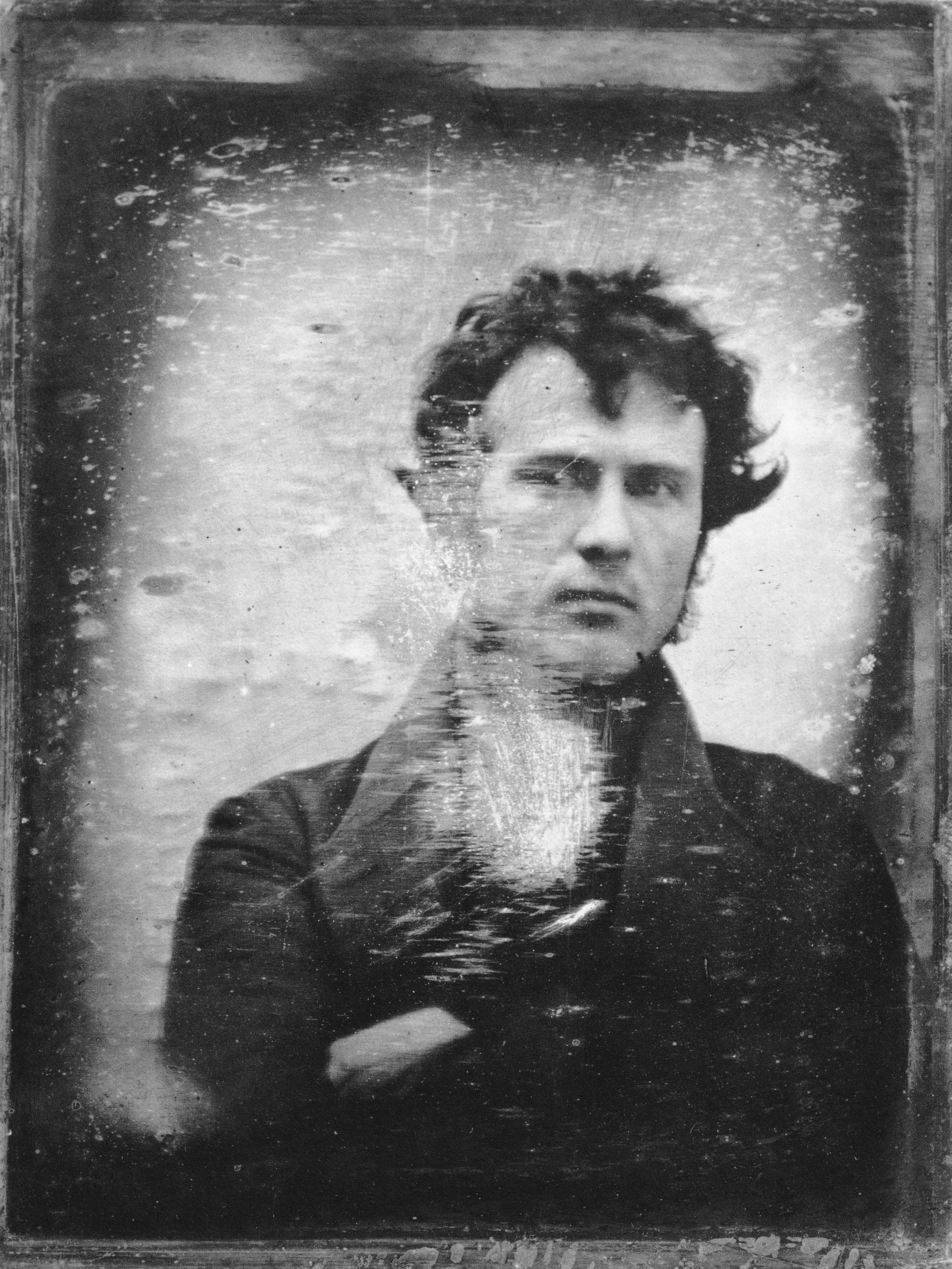
A daguerreotype of Robert Cornelius in 1839. The oldest surviving photographic self-portrait

When the artists create portraits of themselves, they are called a "self-portrait". Identifiable examples become numerous in the late Middle Ages. But if the definition is extended, the first was by the Egyptian Pharaoh Akhenaten's sculptor, Bak, who carved a representation of himself and his wife, Taheri c. 1365 BC. However, it seems likely that self-portraits go back to the cave paintings, the earliest representational art, and literature records several classical examples that are now lost.

== Official portraits ==
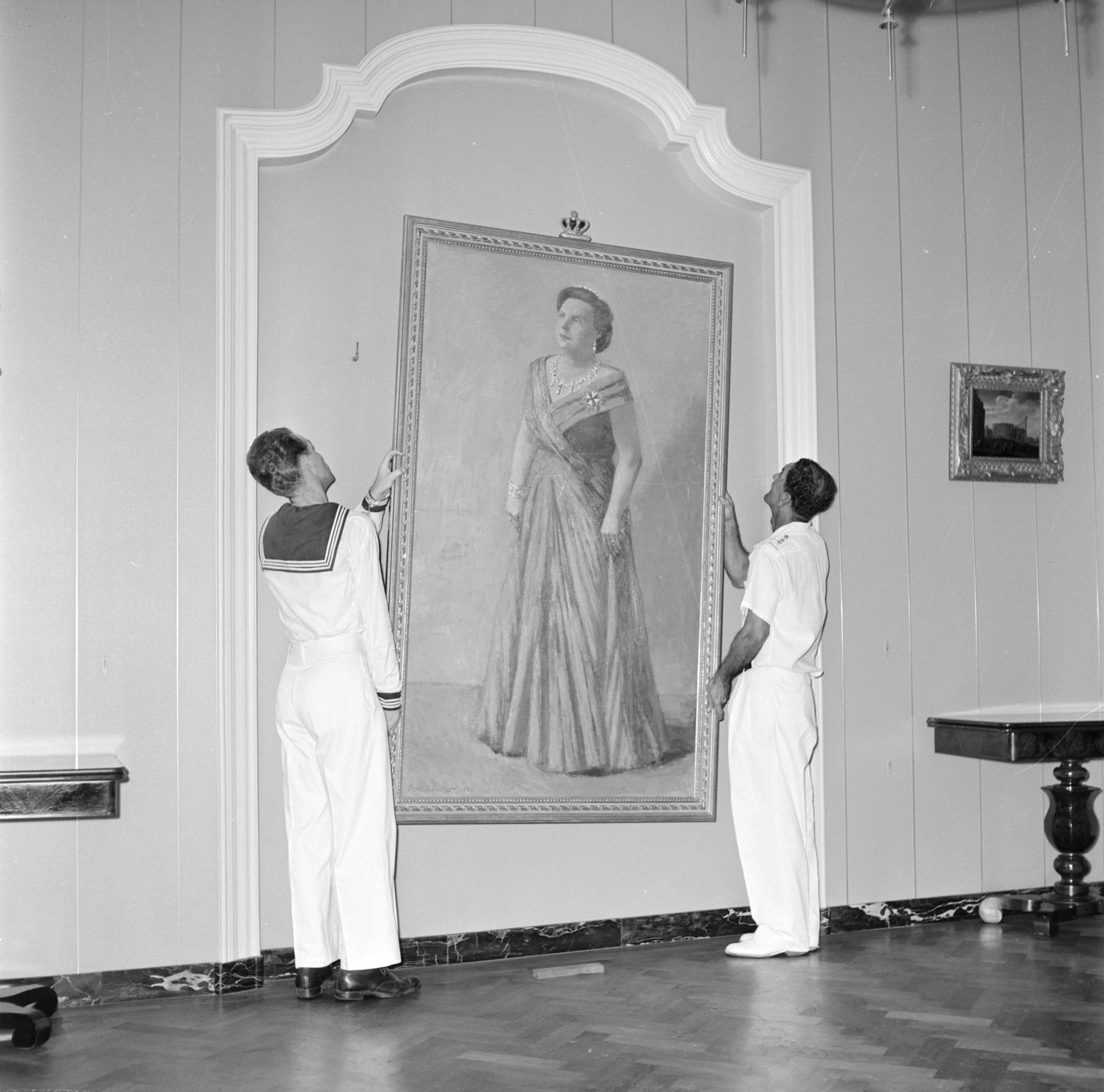
Dutch naval officers hanging a new portrait of Queen Juliana in Fort Amsterdam, October, 1955

Contemporary official portraits are photographs of important personalities, such as monarchs, politicians, or business executives. The portrait is usually decorated with official colors and symbols such as a flag, presidential stripes, or a coat of arms, belonging to a country, state, or municipality. The image may be used during events or meetings, or on products. A well-known example is the portraying of presidents of the United States, a tradition that has existed since the country's founding.

In politics, portraits of the leader are often used as a symbol of the state. These may include paintings. In most countries, it is common protocol for a portrait of the head of state to appear in important government buildings. In many countries, official portraits of monarchs are often also hung in minor government buildings such as courts, city halls, or police stations. During World War II, portraits of exiled heads of state became symbols of unity and resistance. Resistance members would often illegally keep portraits of heads of state hidden in their homes, such as those of Queen Wilhelmina. The tradition of displaying portraits of the presidents of the country often has extended to states in the USA as well.

== Portrait photography ==
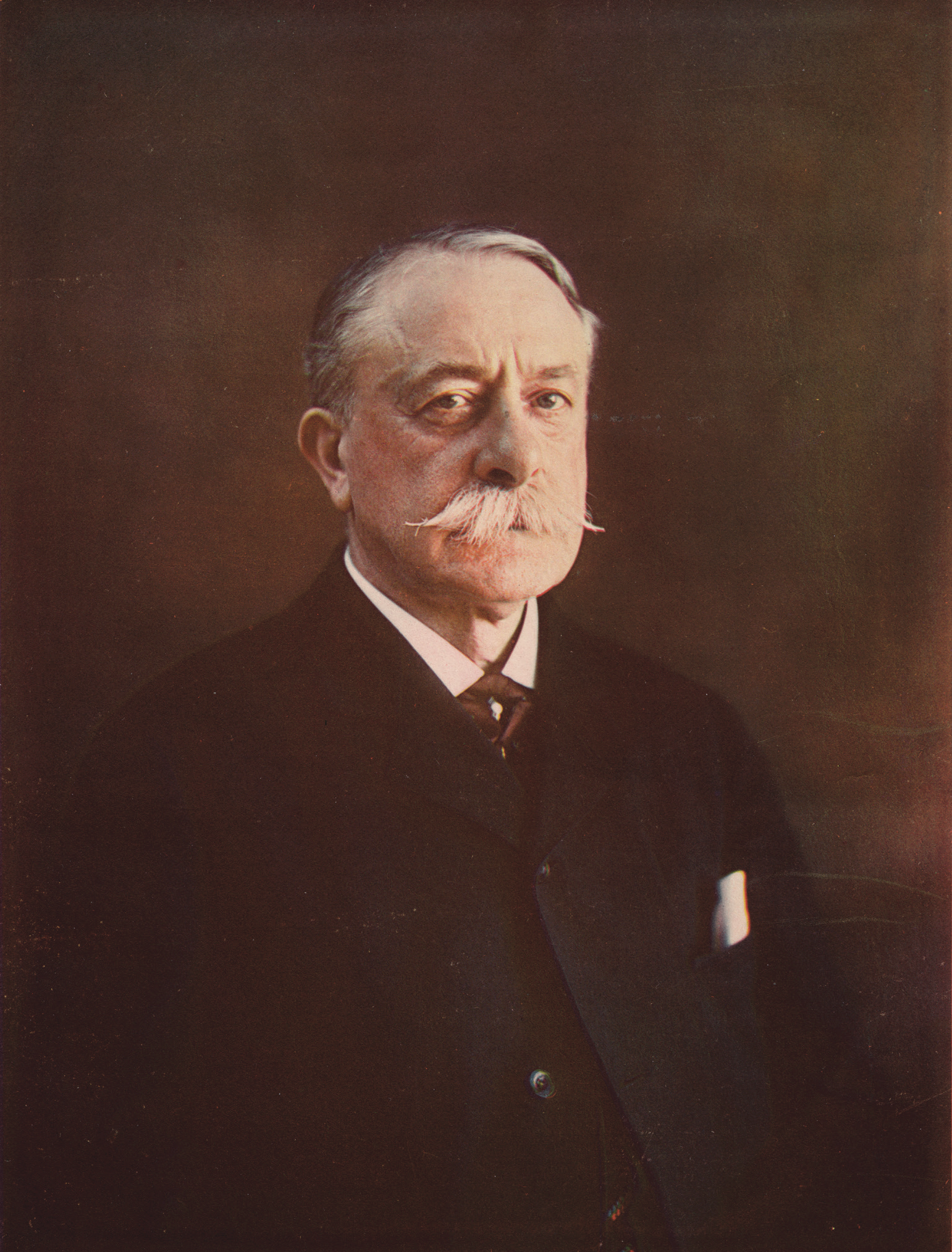
Portrait of Albert Bierstadt made by his brother Edward Bierstadt, c. 1895, possibly the oldest surviving color portrait photograph

Portrait photography is a popular commercial industry all over the world. Many people enjoy having professionally made family portraits to hang in their homes, or special portraits to commemorate certain events, such as graduations or weddings.

Since the dawn of photography people have made portraits. The popularity of the daguerreotype in the middle of the nineteenth century was due in large part to the demand for inexpensive portraiture. Studios sprang up in cities around the world, some cranking out more than 500 plates a day. The style of these early works reflected the technical challenges associated with 30-second exposure times and the painterly aesthetic of the time. Subjects were generally seated against plain backgrounds and lit with the soft light of an overhead window and whatever else could be reflected with mirrors.

As photographic techniques developed, an intrepid group of photographers took their talents out of the studio and onto battlefields, across oceans and into remote wilderness. William Shew's Daguerreotype Saloon, Roger Fenton's Photographic Van, and Mathew Brady's What-is-it? wagon set the standards for making portraits and other photographs in the field. Some photographers took the technique to other countries. Augustus Washington moved to Monrovia, Liberia from Hartford, Connecticut and created daguerreotype portraits for many political leaders for the country.

== Literature ==
In literature the term portrait refers to a written description or analysis of a person or thing. A written portrait often gives deep insight, and offers an analysis that goes far beyond the superficial. For example, the American author Patricia Cornwell wrote a best-selling 2002 book entitled Portrait of a Killer about the personality, background, and possible motivations of Jack the Ripper, as well as the media coverage of his murders, and the subsequent police investigation of his crimes.

However, in literature a portrait of a character is a subtle combination of fact and fiction, exploring the individual psychology of the character in the wider context of their environment. When the subject of the narrative is a historical figure, then the writer is free to create a compelling and dramatic portrait of the person that draws on imaginative invention for verisimilitude. An example is Hilary Mantel's Wolf Hall (2009) which, while acknowledging the work of the historian Mary Robertson for background information, imagines an intimate portrait of Thomas Cromwell and his intense relationship with Henry VIII at a critical time in English history. It could be argued that in literature any portrait is a discreet assembly of facts, anecdotes, and author's insights. Plutarch's Parallel Lives, written in the second century AD, offer a prime example of historical literary portraits, as a source of information about the individuals and their times. Painted portraits can also play a role in literature. These may be fictional portraits, such as that of Dorian Gray in the eponymous 1891 novel by Oscar Wilde. But sometimes also real portraits feature in literature. An example is the portrait of Richard III that plays a role in Josephine Tey's 1951 novel The Daughter of Time.

== See also ==
- Caricature
- Environmental portrait
- Head shot
- Hidden face
- Hierarchy of genres
- Painting the Century: 101 Portrait Masterpieces 1900–2000
- Royal Society of Portrait Painters
- Self-portrait
