= Harrawi =

Harrawi هرّاوي/عرب الحمدون
- Village
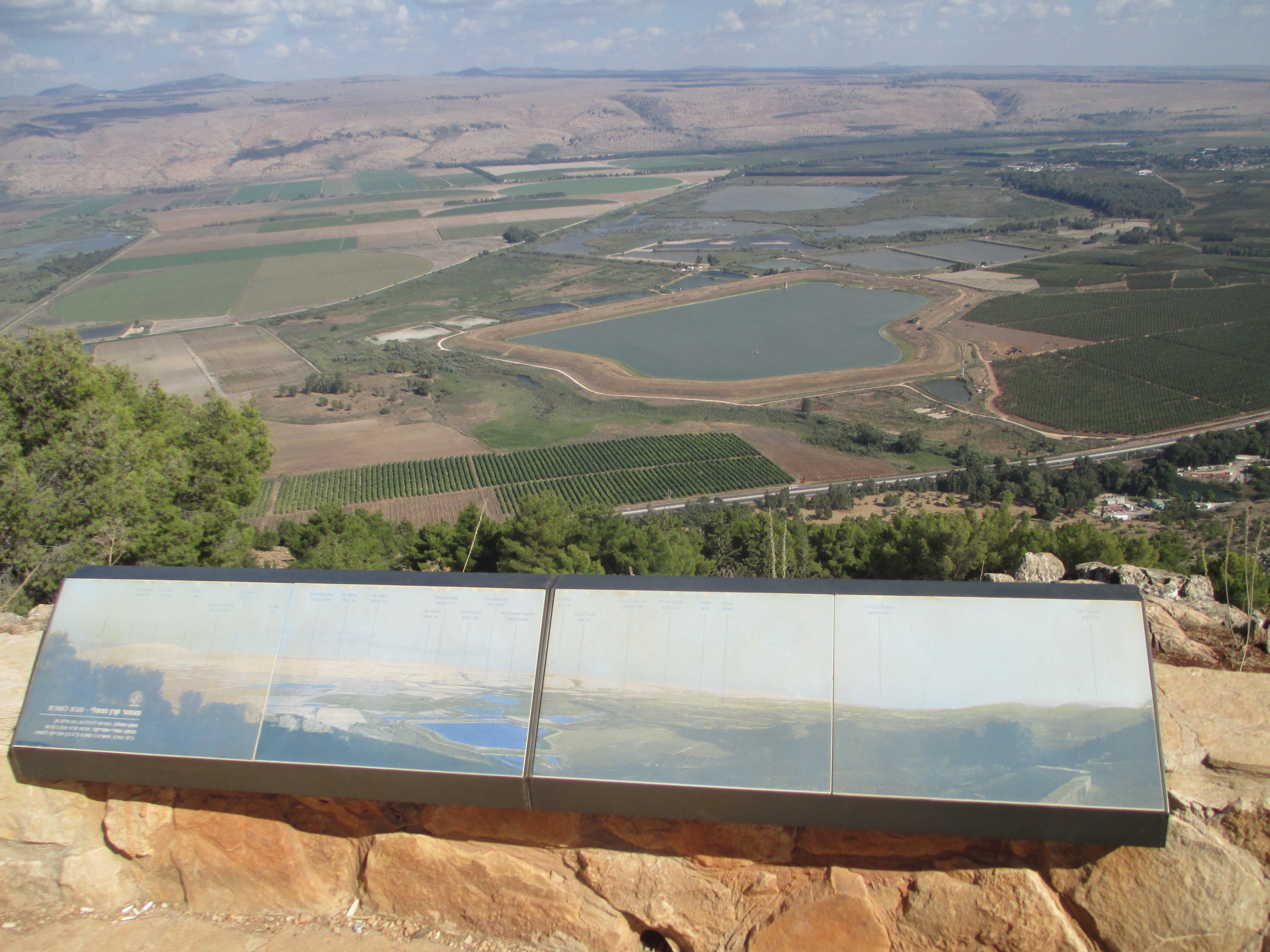
- Keren Naftali lookout
- Etymology: Kh. Harrah, the ruin of Harreh, from personal name.
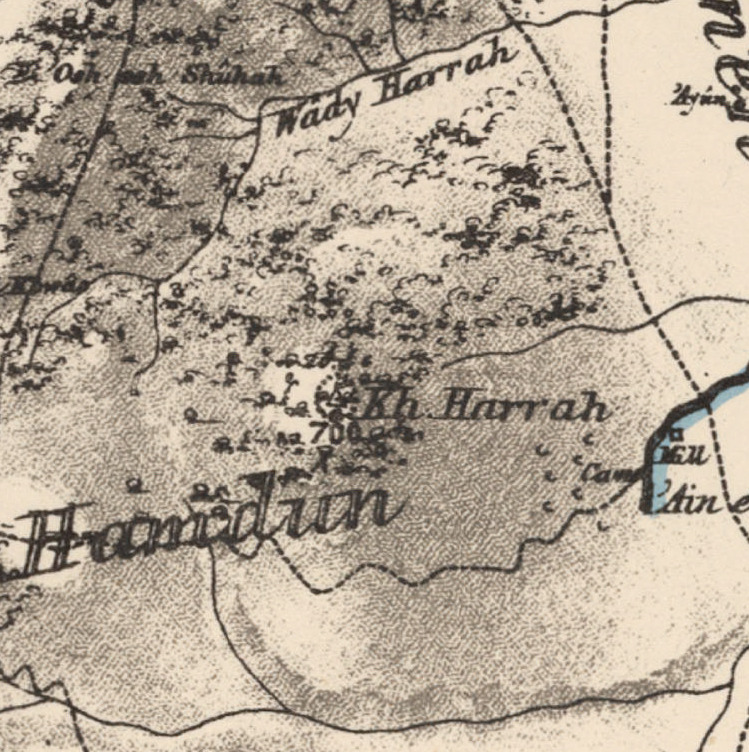
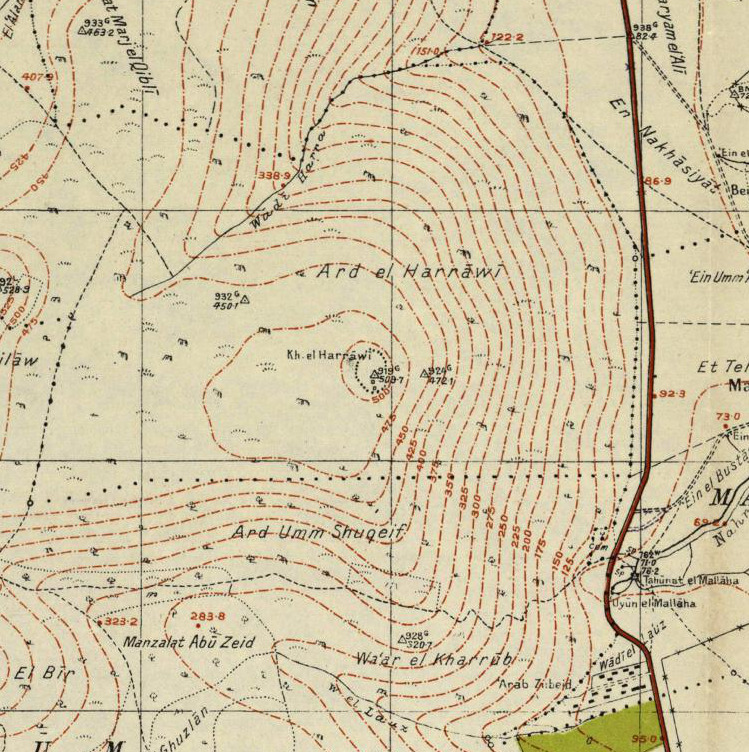
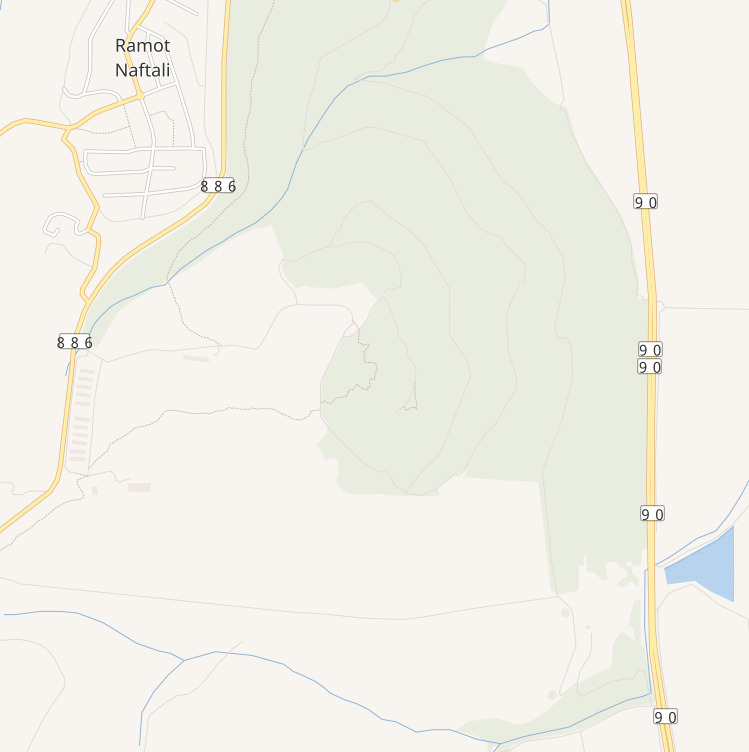
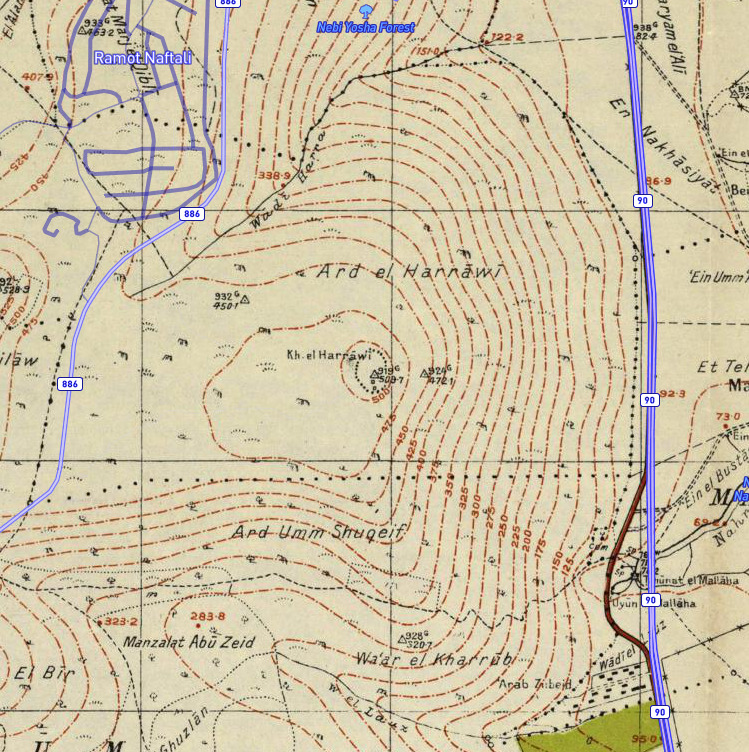
- 1870s map 1940s map modern map 1940s with modern overlay map A series of historical maps of the area around Harrawi (click the buttons)

- Location within Mandatory Palestine
- Coordinates: 33°5′27″N 35°33′47″E
- Palestine grid: 202/277
- Geopolitical entity: Mandatory Palestine
- Subdistrict: Safad
- Date of depopulation: 1948

Population (1931)
  - Total: 148

Harrawi (Arabic: هرّاوي/عرب الحمدون) was a Palestinian Arab village in the Safad Subdistrict. It was depopulated during the 1948 Arab-Israeli War on May 25, 1948, by the Palmach's First Battalion of Operation Yiftach. It was located 18 km northeast of Safad.

In 1948, it had a population of 290.

== History ==
The villagers of Harrawi were descendants of Bedouin from the 'Arab al-Hamdun tribe. There is evidence to suggest the village was inhabited as far back as the early Byzantine period, with ruins of Greek inscriptions, old walls, tessellated floors, and a wine-press.

In 1875, Victor Guérin passed by, and thought the ruins he found there could be ancient Hazor. The same was reported in 1881, by the PEF's Survey of Western Palestine (SWP).

=== British Mandate era ===
In the 1931 census of Palestine, conducted by the British Mandate authorities, Arab el Hamdun had a population of 148 Muslims, in a total of 36 houses.

Harrawi was located on a mountain in eastern Upper Galilee. The area is forested but much land was converted by the settlers for agricultural purposes, given that in 1945, 551 dunums of land was devoted to the farming of cereals. However, they were also employed in animal husbandry, and brought their livestock down seasonal pastures in the winter.

A large number of inhabitants were employed in cereal farming, which dominated all of the area under cultivation.

Types of land use in dunums by Arabs in the 1945 statistics:

Land Usage	Arab	Jewish
Cereal	551	330
Urban	0	2
Cultivable	551	330
Non-cultivable	1,704	1,139

The village comprised a total area of 3,726 dunums of which 60% was owned by Arabs and 40% by Jews. The land ownership of the village before occupation in dunums:

Owner	Durums
Arab	2,255
Jewish	1,471
Public	0
Total	3,726

=== 1948 conflict and depopulation ===
Although it was in May 1948 that the village was depopulated, the Palestinian newspaper Filastin reported an incident that occurred in February 1948 when a bus carrying Arab passengers en route from al-Hula to Safad was ambushed at Harrawi on 12 February by a Zionist military unit. A mine exploded under the bus which was also subject to gunfire and firebombing, killing four people.

In mid May 1948, the village was defended by the Arab Liberation Army's Second Yarmuk Battalion, commanded by Lt. Col. Adib Shishakli, who later served as president of Syria. The initial resistance was reported by the American newspaper The New York Times in Damascus to have been a success, with the ALA claiming victories at Harrawi and al-Malikiyya, located 5 km to the northwest. However, any early successes were short-lived; Harrawi, along with the nearby villages of Mallaha and Baysamun fell to the Israeli Palmach's First Battalion of Operation Yiftach May 25.

Ramot Naftali is located close to the village site, but it is not on Harrawi land; it is located on Al-Nabi Yusha' land.

In 1992, the village site was described: "No traces of the village are visible. Woods cover the slopes and peak of the mountain on which the village was located. Some of the lands in the area are wooded while others have been planted by Israelis with fruit trees."

== Bibliography ==
- Conder, C.R.; Kitchener, H.H. (1881). The Survey of Western Palestine: Memoirs of the Topography, Orography, Hydrography, and Archaeology. Vol. 1. London: Committee of the Palestine Exploration Fund.
- Department of Statistics (1945). Village Statistics, April, 1945. Government of Palestine.
- Grootkerk, Salomon E. (2000). Ancient sites in Galilee: a toponymic gazetteer (Illustrated ed.). BRILL. ISBN 978-90-04-11535-4.(p. 120)
- Guérin, V. (1880). Description Géographique Historique et Archéologique de la Palestine (in French). Vol. 3: Galilee, pt. 2. Paris: L'Imprimerie Nationale.
- Hadawi, S. (1970). Village Statistics of 1945: A Classification of Land and Area ownership in Palestine. Palestine Liberation Organization Research Centre.
- Khalidi, W. (1992). All That Remains: The Palestinian Villages Occupied and Depopulated by Israel in 1948. Washington D.C.: Institute for Palestine Studies. ISBN 0-88728-224-5.
- Mills, E., ed. (1932). Census of Palestine 1931. Population of Villages, Towns and Administrative Areas. Jerusalem: Government of Palestine.
- Morris, B. (2004). The Birth of the Palestinian Refugee Problem Revisited. Cambridge University Press. ISBN 978-0-521-00967-6.
- Palmer, E.H. (1881). The Survey of Western Palestine: Arabic and English Name Lists Collected During the Survey by Lieutenants Conder and Kitchener, R. E. Transliterated and Explained by E.H. Palmer. Committee of the Palestine Exploration Fund.
- al-Qawuqji, F. (1972): Memoirs of al-Qawuqji, Fauzi in Journal of Palestine Studies
  - "Memoirs, 1948, Part I" in 1, no. 4 (Sum. 72): 27-58., dpf-file, downloadable
  - "Memoirs, 1948, Part II" in 2, no. 1 (Aut. 72): 3-33., dpf-file, downloadable
- Robinson, E.; Smith, E. (1856). Later Biblical Researches in Palestine and adjacent regions: A Journal of Travels in the year 1852. London: John Murray.
