= Plastered human skulls =

Neolithic burial practice in the Levant

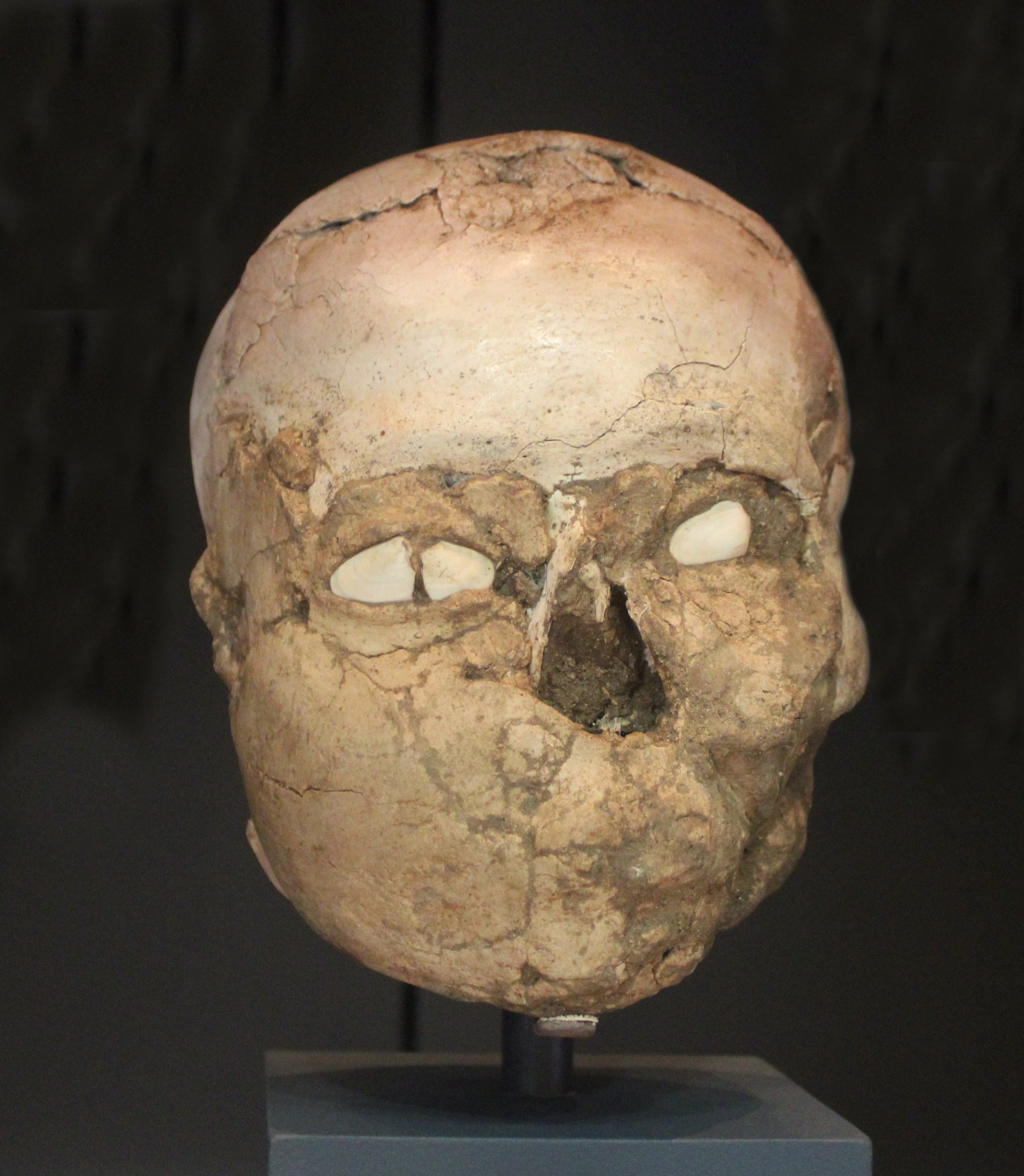
- Plastered skull, Tell es-Sultan, Jericho, from approximately 9000 years ago (British Museum)
- Material: Plaster and bone
- Created: 8000–6000 BC
- Present location: Palestine

Plastered human skulls are human skulls covered in layers of plaster and typically found in the ancient Levant, most notably around the city of Jericho, between 8000 and 6000 BC (approximately 9000 years ago), in the Pre-Pottery Neolithic B period. They represent some of the oldest forms of art in the Middle East and demonstrate that the prehistoric population took great care in burying their ancestors below their homes. The skulls denote some of the earliest sculptural examples of portraiture in the history of art.

The process typically included the removal of the jawbone. Signs of wear suggest they were handled over time. These skulls were often found interred alongside other human remains, and each cache displays a consistent style within. The skulls are generally with a backward tilt, and no pattern is discernible concerning the age or gender of the individuals selected for skull plastering.

== Discovery ==
One skull was accidentally unearthed in the 1930s by the archaeologist John Garstang at Jericho in Mandatory Palestine. A number of plastered skulls from Jericho were discovered by the British archaeologist Kathleen Kenyon in the 1950s and can now be found in the collections of the British Museum, the Ashmolean Museum, the Cambridge Museum of Archaeology and Anthropology, the Royal Ontario Museum, the Chau Chak Wing Museum in Sydney, and the Jordan Archaeological Museum.

Other sites where plastered skulls were excavated include Ain Ghazal near Amman, Jordan and Tell Ramad in Syria. Most of the plastered skulls were from adult males, but some belonged to women and children.

== Archaeological significance ==
The plastered skulls represent some of the earliest forms of burial practices in the southern Levant. During the Neolithic period, the deceased were often buried under the floors of their homes. In other words, a plaster skull sometimes went under a plaster floor. Sometimes the skull was removed and its cavities filled with plaster and painted. In order to create more lifelike faces, shells were inset for eyes and paint was used to represent facial features, hair, and moustaches.

Some scholars believe that this burial practice represents an early form of ancestor worship, where the plastered skulls were used to commemorate and respect family ancestors. Other experts argue that the plastered skulls could be linked to the practice of head hunting and use as trophies, although there is scarce evidence to support this. Plastered skulls provide evidence about the earliest arts and religious practices in the ancient Near East.

== Quality ==
The artisanship of one example was acclaimed in Schmandt-Besserat's review of literature and specimens.

Finally, one word must be added on the truly outstanding artistic quality of Skull 88-1... the 9000-year-old plastered skull exhibits a remarkable sophistication in the treatment of the human visage. It exemplifies the work of an individual in full command of his/her craft, who handled the difficult plaster technology with great skill, captured the anatomy of the face, and masterfully executed the modeling. The area of the eyebrows and the dreamy expression of the eyes are particularly impressive.

The author mentions the locations of some of the discoveries: Jericho; Beisamoun, Kfar HaHoresh, and Yiftahel; Tell Ramad and Tell Awad in Syria, and Kösk Höyük in Turkey.

== Texts ==
A written reference known to history is in the Tale of Aqhat.

"A mortal,
what does he get in the end?
What does a mortal finally get?
Glaze poured on his head,
lime on top of his skull."

== Gallery ==
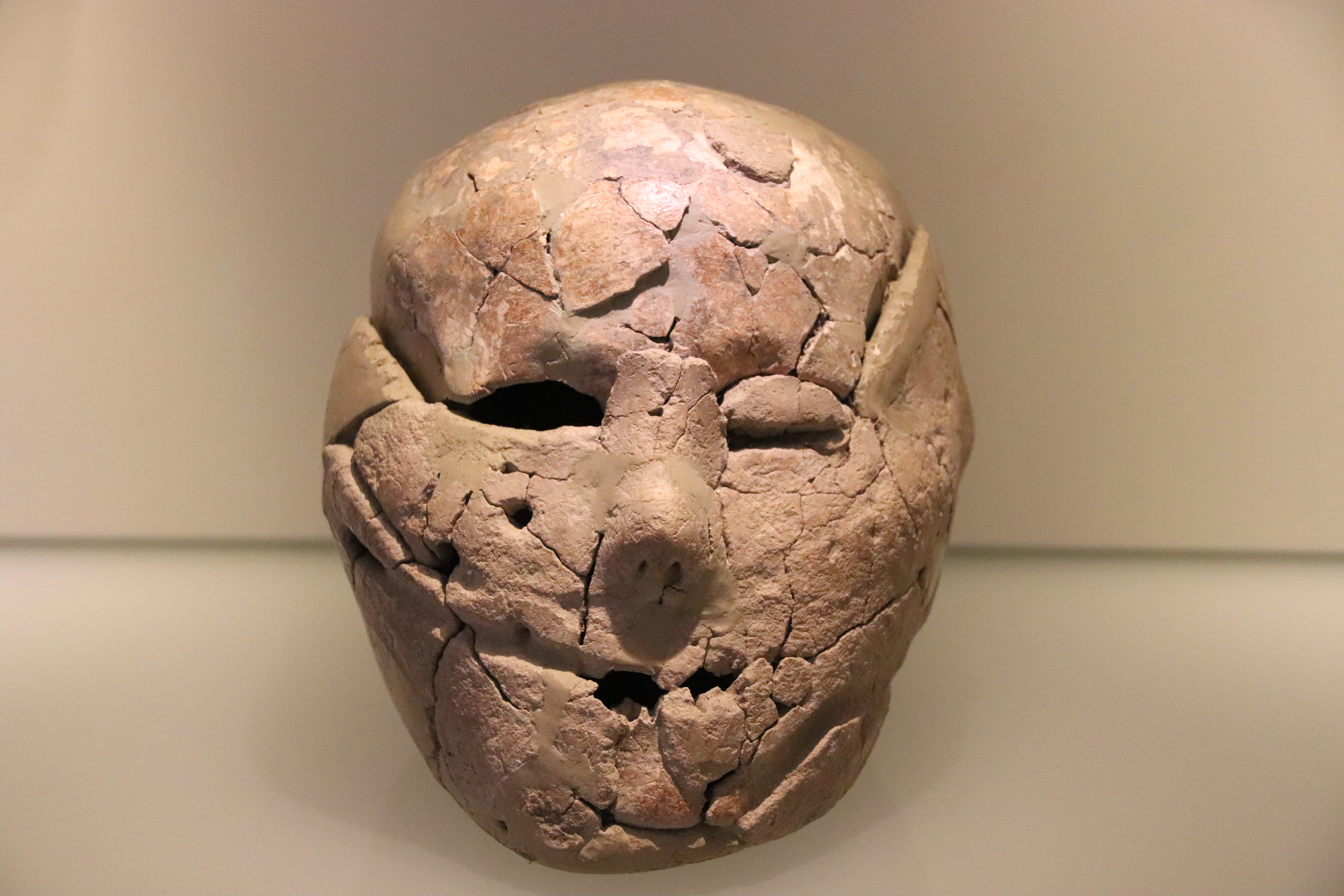
Plastered skull from Beisamoun, PPNB, on display at the Israel Museum, Jerusalem

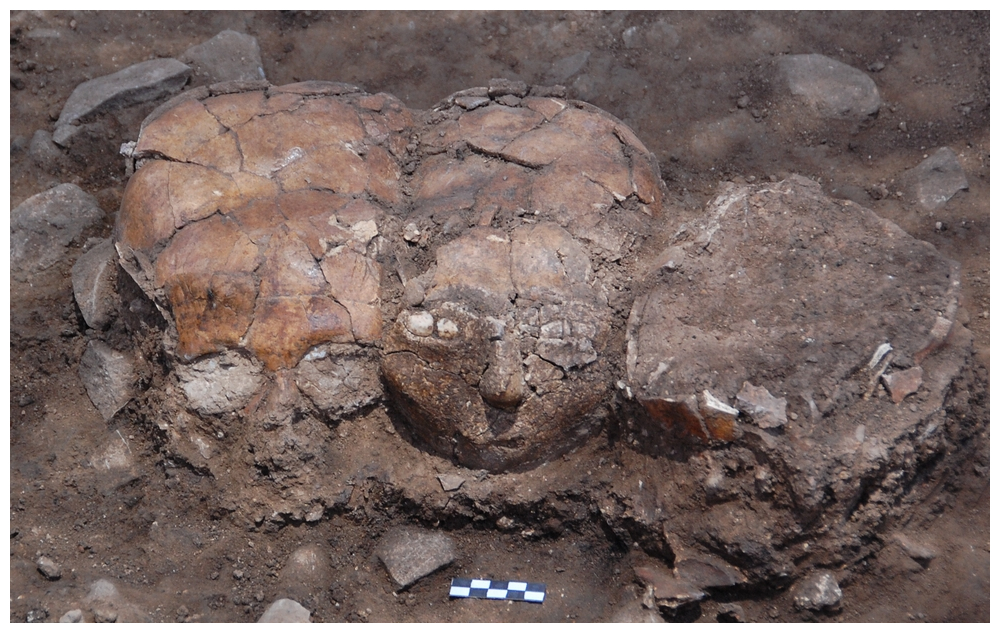
Plastered skulls in situ at Yiftahel, Pre-Pottery Neolithic B

== External ==
The "oldest portrait in the museum": Jericho skull with shell eyes https://www.ashmolean.org/jericho-skull

== See also ==
- Bucrania
- Teraphim
