= Al-Na'ima =

Al-Na'ima الناعمة
- Etymology: The soft soil
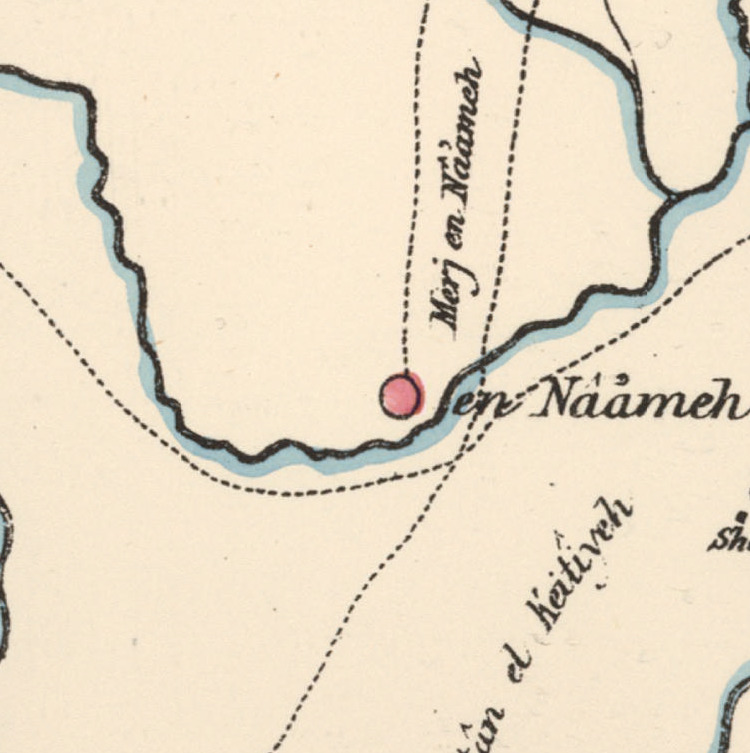
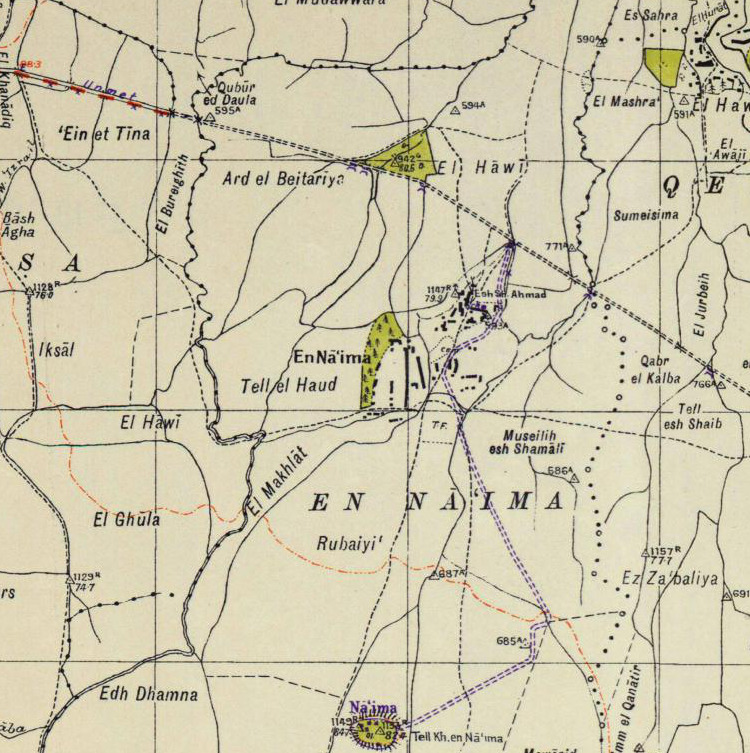
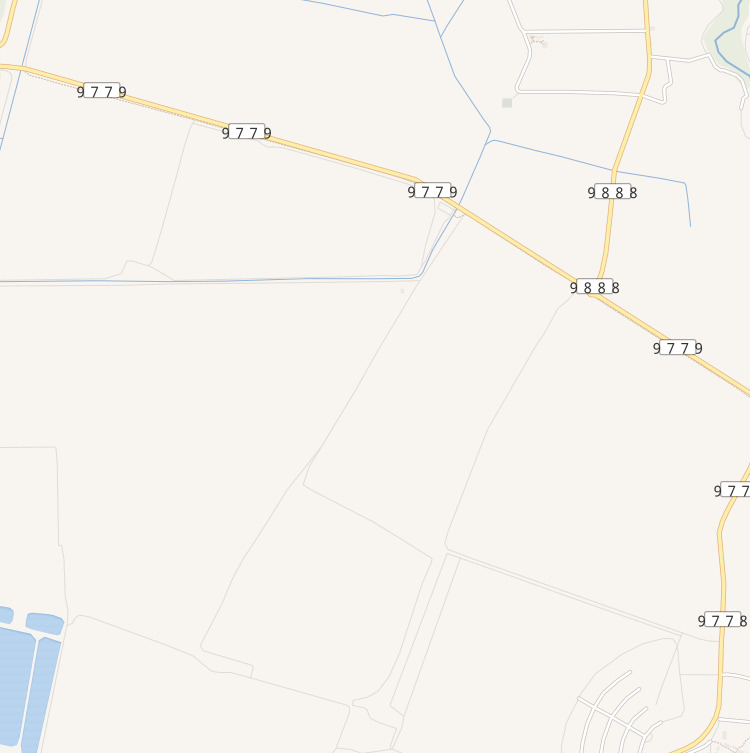
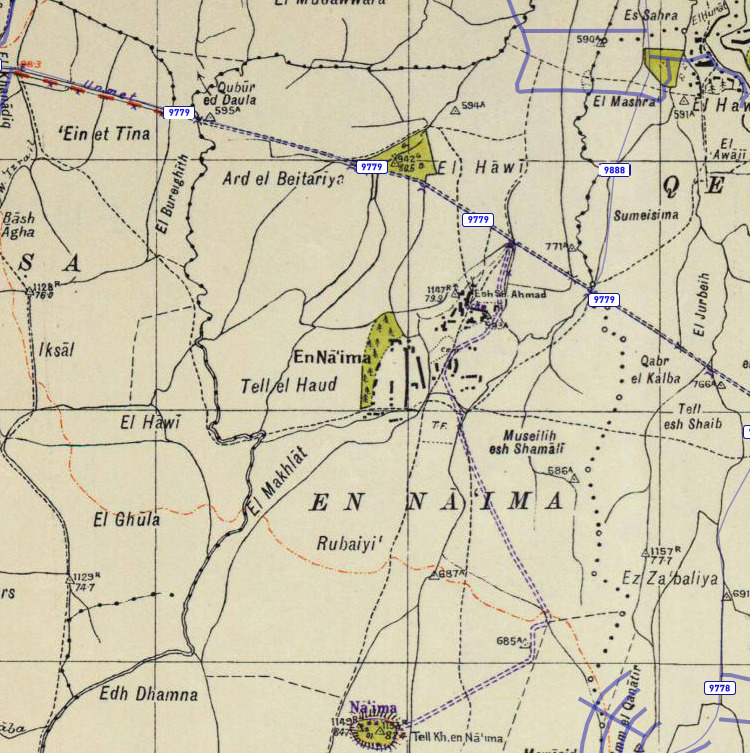
- 1870s map 1940s map modern map 1940s with modern overlay map A series of historical maps of the area around Al-Na'ima (click the buttons)

- Location within Mandatory Palestine
- Coordinates: 33°11′17″N 35°35′42″E
- Palestine grid: 206/288
- Geopolitical entity: Mandatory Palestine
- Subdistrict: Safad
- Date of depopulation: May 14, 1948

Area
  - Total: 7,155 dunams (7.155 km^{2}; 2.763 sq mi)

Population (1945)
  - Total: 1,240 (1,340 Arabs and 210 Jews)
- Cause(s) of depopulation: Influence of nearby town's fall
- Current Localities: Neot Mordechai, Kefar Blum, and Beyt Hillel

Al-Na'ima (Arabic: الناعمة) was a Palestinian Arab village in the Safad Subdistrict of Mandatory Palestine located 26 kilometres (16 mi) northeast of Safad, near the al-Hula Plain. The settlement was depopulated during the 1947-1948 civil war on May 14, 1948 by the Israeli Palmach's First Battalion as part of Operation Yiftach.

In the 1945 statistics it had a population of 1,240 of whom 210 were Jews.

== History ==
In 1881, during the late Ottoman period, the PEF's Survey of Western Palestine described the village as a "Stone and mud village, on the Huleh Plain, containing about 100 Moslems".

=== British Mandate era ===
The village had a boys' elementary school. A shrine dedicated to local sage al-Shaykh al-Wayzi lay about 0.5 kilometres (0.31 mi) from the site as did a stone quarry.

In the 1931 census of Palestine, conducted by the British Mandate authorities, En Na'ima had a population of 858, all Muslims, in a total of 174 houses.

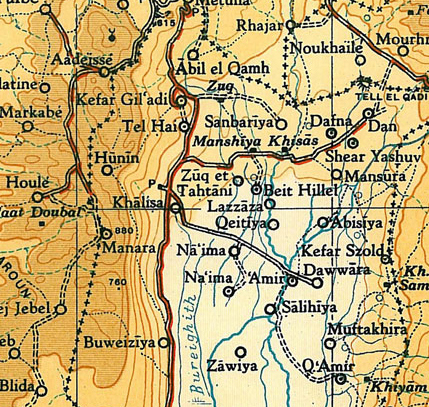
Al-Naima, 1946

Types of land use in dunams in the village in the 1945 statistics:

Land Usage	Arab	Jewish
Irrigated and plantation	4,122	2,197
Cereal	156	217
Cultivable	4,278	2,414
Urban	112	0
Non-cultivable	60	0

The land ownership of the village before occupation in dunams:

Owner	Dunams
Arab	4,450
Jewish	2,414
Public	291
Total	7,155

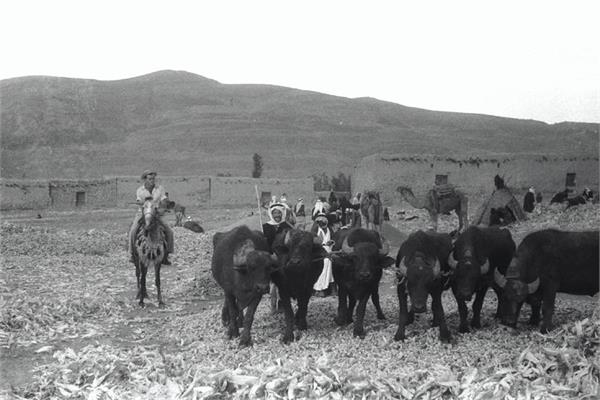
Threshing: Al-Na'ima, 1943

=== 1948, and aftermath ===
During the 1948 war, Al-Na'ima was depopulated during Operation Yiftach which targeted Safad and the surrounding district. When the city of Safad was finally attacked between the 10 and 11 May 1948, morale in the village was low; according to an Israeli intelligence report, many residents fled on 14 May shortly before advancing Israeli troops entered.

The settlement of Neot Mordechai was built in 1946 to the south of the village while to the north is the settlement of Beyt Hillel, built in 1940. Kefar Blum, built in 1943 lies 2 kilometres (1.2 mi) to the southeast.

== Bibliography ==
- Conder, C.R.; Kitchener, H.H. (1881). The Survey of Western Palestine: Memoirs of the Topography, Orography, Hydrography, and Archaeology. Vol. 1. London: Committee of the Palestine Exploration Fund.
- Department of Statistics (1945). Village Statistics, April, 1945. Government of Palestine.
- Esber, R.M. (2008). Under the Cover of War, The Zionist Expulsions of the Palestinians. Arabicus Books & Media. ISBN 978-0981513171.
- Hadawi, S. (1970). Village Statistics of 1945: A Classification of Land and Area ownership in Palestine. Palestine Liberation Organization Research Center. Archived from the original on 2018-12-08.
- Khalidi, W. (1992). All That Remains: The Palestinian Villages Occupied and Depopulated by Israel in 1948. Washington D.C.: Institute for Palestine Studies. ISBN 0-88728-224-5.
- Mills, E., ed. (1932). Census of Palestine 1931. Population of Villages, Towns and Administrative Areas. Jerusalem: Government of Palestine.
- Morris, B. (2004). The Birth of the Palestinian Refugee Problem Revisited. Cambridge University Press. ISBN 978-0-521-00967-6.
- Palmer, E.H. (1881). The Survey of Western Palestine: Arabic and English Name Lists Collected During the Survey by Lieutenants Conder and Kitchener, R. E. Transliterated and Explained by E.H. Palmer. Committee of the Palestine Exploration Fund.
