= Operation Yiftach =

Palmach offensive

Operation Yiftach (Hebrew: מבצע יפתח, Mivtza Yiftah) was a Palmach offensive carried out between 28 April and 23 May 1948. The objectives were to capture Safed and to secure the eastern Galilee before the British Mandate ended on 14 May 1948. It was carried out by two Palmach battalions commanded by Yigal Allon.

== Background ==
The Palmah defined the aim of Operation Yiftach as "the destruction of bases of the enemy ... and to destroy points of assembly for invading forces from the east [and] ... to join the lower and upper Galilee with a relatively wide and safe strip." Chaim Herzog viewed Operation Yiftach as part of Plan Dalet. Plan Dalet aimed at securing the areas allocated to the Jewish state in the UN partition plan before the end of the British Mandate in Palestine. Benny Morris, citing IDF and Haganah archival material, wrote that Plan Dalet had not been activated. He viewed some actions taken as piecemeal implementations of the plan, with commanders thinking they were handling particular local challenges in a non-orchestrated fashion. With the ending of the Mandate in sight, British forces had begun to withdraw from less strategic areas such as north-eastern Galilee. In these areas there was a scramble by both sides to occupy abandoned police and military facilities. Local militias and Arab volunteers had taken over the Palestine Police forts in Safed and at al-Nabi Yusha'.

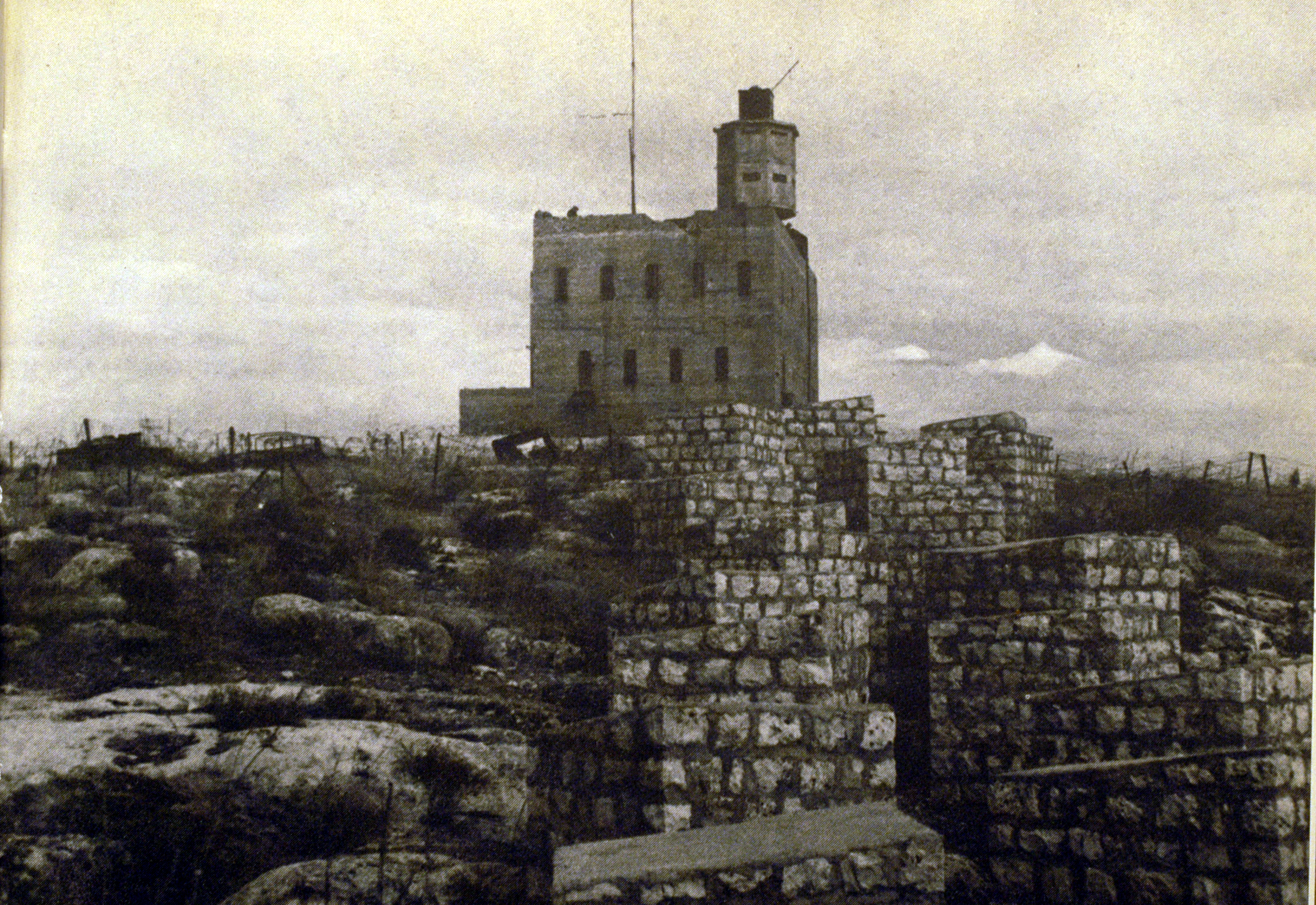
The fort at Nebi Yusha

On 17 April the Haganah launched an attack on the fort at al-Nabi Yusha', which failed. A second attack on 20 April resulted in the deaths of 22 of the attackers. As a result of this defeat, Yigal Allon, the Palmach commander, was placed in charge of the operation. Al-Nabi Yusha' was finally taken on 20 April in an attack in which planes dropped incendiary bombs on the fort. On 21 April, Allon surveyed the area from a spotter aircraft. On 22 April, Allon wrote the Haganah General Staff recommending a series of operations to brace for invasion in the Eastern Galilee. Benny Morris saw these as in line with Plan Dalet. The army camp at Rosh Pinna was handed over to the Haganah/Palmach by its British commander on 28 April.

Allon's initial orders had the objective "taking control of the Tel Hai area and its consolidation in preparation for [the] invasion." Allon recommended that the way to do this was for the Eastern Galilee "to be pacified" and the towns of Beit Shean (Beisan) and Safad to be cleared. This campaign and a later Operation Dani in July, where "he left no Arab communities in his wake" led Morris to conclude that he had "no doubt let his officers know" what he wanted and they probably knew anyway.

Safed had a prewar population of 10,000–12,000 Arabs and 1,500 Jews, and was the base for 700–800 local and foreign irregulars. The attack on Safed was similar to the attack on Arab Tiberias on 16–17 April, in that it began with a particularly destructive attack on a neighbouring village resulting in loss of morale in the town.

== Operation ==
On 1 May 1948, the Palmach's 3rd Battalion attacked the village of Ein al-Zeitun, 1 km north of Safed. It began shelling the village at 03:00 in the morning, using one of the first Davidka mortars as well as two 3-inch and eight 2-inch conventional mortars. The Davidka was a homemade mortar that fired an oversized shell and was nearly useless due to its inaccuracy, but was useful because of the loud noise of the projectile when it flew and detonated. Although hardly capable of causing casualties, the weapon actually was quite effective in demoralizing defending Arabs, some of whom reportedly even thought the explosions were "atomic bombs", which they knew Jews had helped to develop.

Once they entered the village most of the 'young adult males' fled but 37 were taken prisoner and were probably amongst the 70 men executed in a valley between the village and Safed two days later. Those who remained in the village were rounded up and expelled. Over the next two days Palmach sappers blew up and burnt houses in the village. There followed a sub-operation, Operation Matateh, starting on 4 May, which cleared five Bedouin tribes from the Jordan Valley south of Rosh Pinna."

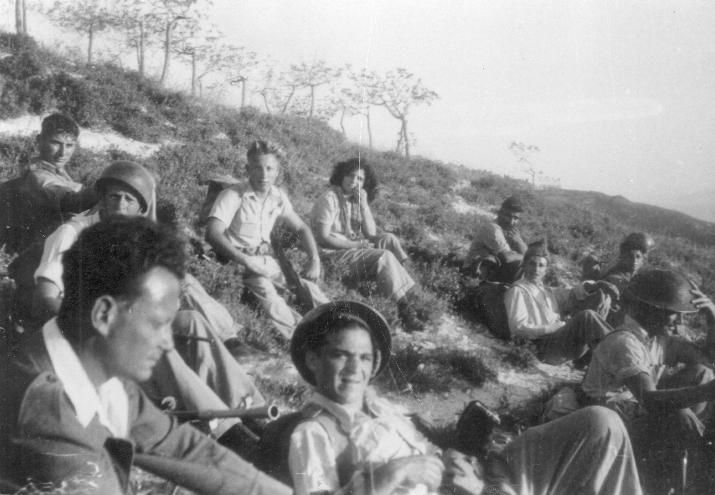
Yigal Allon (left) with members of the Yiftach Brigade following the failed attack on Safed

On 6 May the Palmach launched a ground attack on Safed, but failed to take the citadel. The failure was blamed on insufficient bombardment. Despite Arab attempts to negotiate a truce and the British Army being authorised to intervene, a second attack was launched on night of 9–10 May. It was preceded by a 'massive, concentrated' mortar bombardment in which the Davidka was used again. An Israeli account describes the final assault as occurring in heavy rainfall, with Palmach forces fighting "all night, attacking in waves up the hilly streets of the town, fighting from house to house and from room to room."

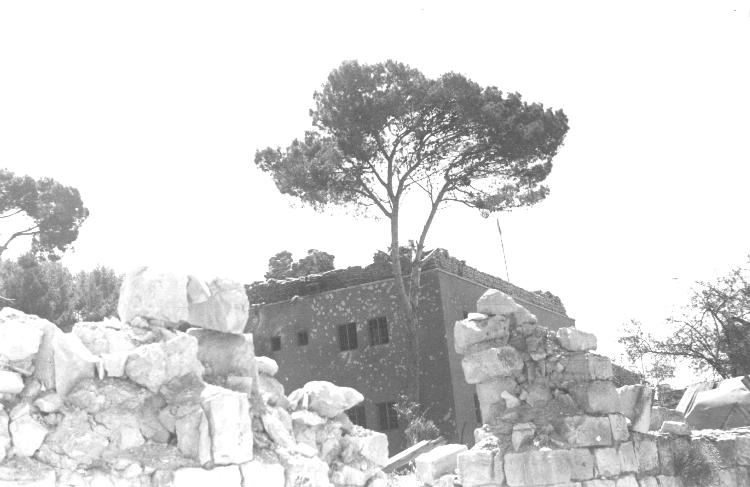
Safad police station, May 1948

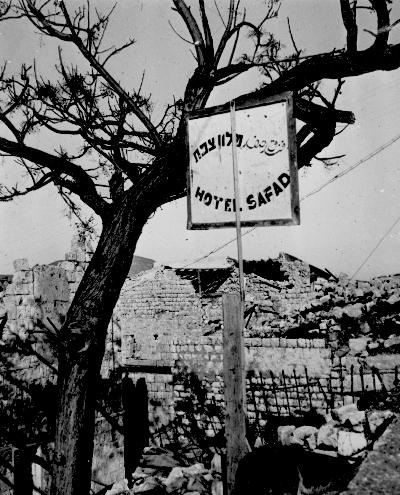
Hotel Safad, May 1948

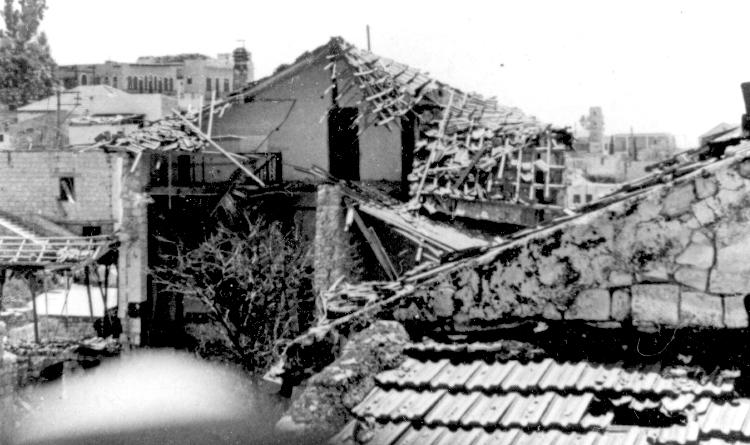
Safed after the bombardment, May 1948

Following the capture of Safed, Palmach units moved north to secure the borders with Lebanon and Syria. On 14–15 May the Palmach's 1st Battalion was involved in a clash with Lebanese units at Qabas. In his later writing Allon claimed that a 'whispering' campaign he launched was of great importance. This involved local Jewish mukhtars who had contacts in local Arab communities being told "to whisper in the ears of several Arabs that giant Jewish reinforcements had reached Galilee and were about to clean out the villages of the Hula". An IDF intelligence report attributed success to this tactic in the case of ten villages, though it suggest that some may also have been bombarded. There is some evidence that 'Syrian officers or Arab irregular commanders' ordered women and children be evacuated from villages north-east of Rosh Pinna.

== Aftermath ==
In the words of Chaim Herzog, on the morning of 11 May "the Palmach forces fought all night, attack in waves up the hilly streets of the town ... By the morning of the next day, the strongpoints were in Jewish hands and the by-now-familiar mass Arab evacuation from the town began. With the imminence of invasion by the Arab armies, the capture of Safed had been vital to maintain the Jewish position in north-east Galilee" The only civilians who remained in Safed were "about" 100 Muslims, "average age 80" and "34-36 elderly Christian Arabs". In late May or early June the Muslims were "expelled" to Lebanon and on 13 June the Christians were removed by lorry to Haifa. 4–5,000 Bedouin and villagers who remained in the Hula area after the creation of the state of Israel were trucked across the Syrian border during the 1956 Suez War.

== Arab communities captured during Operation Yiftach ==
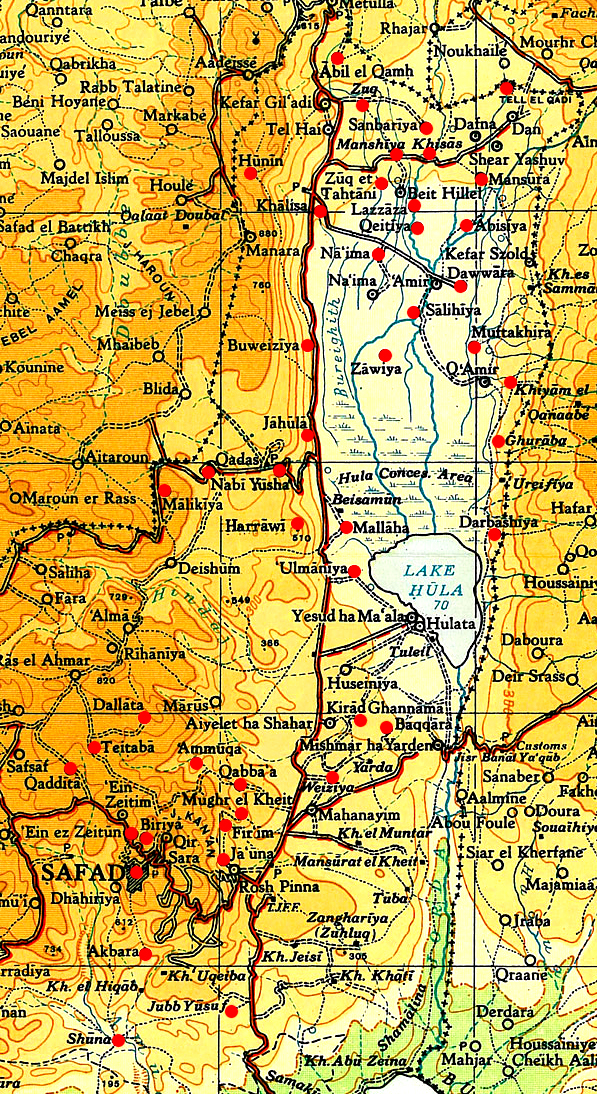
Villages captured during Operation Yiftach

Name	Date	Defending forces	Brigade	Population
'Arab al-Zubayd	20 April 1948	villagers fled	n/a	800
Al 'Ulmaniyya	20 April 1984	n/a	n/a	260
Kirad al-Ghannama	22 April 1948	evacuated	n/a	350
Kirad al-Walid	22 April 1948	evacuated	n/a	280
Kirad al-Baqqara	22 April 1948	n/a	Palmach 1st Battalion	360
Tulayl	late April 1948	n/a	n/a	340
Al-Didara	April/May 1948	n/a	n/a	100
Al-Shuna	April/May 1948	n/a	n/a	170
Ein al-Zaytun	1 May 1948	none	Palmach 3rd Battalion	820
Biriyya	1 May 1948	n/a	n/a	240
Ghuraba	1 May 1948	n/a	n/a	220
Khiyam al-Wali	1 May 1948	evacuated	n/a	280
Al-Muftakhira	1 & 16 May 1948	n/a	n/a	350
Fir'im	2 & 26 May 1948	n/a	n/a	740
Mughr al-Khayt	2 May 1948	n/a	n/a	490
Qabba'a	2 May 1948	n/a	n/a	460
Al-Wayziyya	2 May 1948	n/a	n/a	100
Jubb Yusuf	4 May 1948	n/a	n/a	170
Harrawi	5 & 25 May 1948	Arab Liberation Army	n/a	n/a
'Akbara	9 May 1948	15-20 villagers	Palmach 1st Battalion	390
Al-Ja'una	9 May 1948	n/a	n/a	1,150
Safed	9/10 May 1948	Arab Liberation Army local militia	Palmach	12,610; 9,780 Muslim; 2,400 Jews; 430 Christians
Abil al-Qamh	10 May 1948	n/a	Palmach 1st Battalion	330
Al-Zahiriyya al-Tahta	10 May 1948	village militia 20-30 men	n/a	350
Dallata	10–11 May 1948	n/a	n/a	360
Qaddita	by 11 May 1948	n/a	whispering campaign	240
Al-Buwayziyya	11 May 1948	villagers fled	n/a	510
Al-Khalisa	11 May 1948	village militia	n/a	1,840
Al-Zuq Al-Tahtani	11 May 1948	n/a	n/a	1,050
Al-Malikiyya	12 May 1948 changed hands 15 May, 29 May, 7 June, Operation Hiram	Arab Liberation Army; 2nd Yarmuk Battalion	Palmach	360
Hunin	14 May 1948	village militia	n/a	1,620
Al-Na'ima	14 May 1948	n/a	n/a	1,240 inc. 210 Jews
Al-Shawka al-Tahta	14 May 1948	villagers fled	n/a	200
Khan al-Duway	15 May 1948	n/a	n/a	260
Qatiyya	19 May 1948	n/a	n/a	940
Lazzaza	21 May 1948	evacuated	whispering campaign	230 inc 100 Jews
Al-Zuq al-Fauqani	21 May 1948	village militia 20-30 men	whispering campaign	160
'Ammuqa	24 May 1948	evacuated	Palmach	140
Al-Zawiya	24 May 1948	n/a	n/a	760
Al-Manshiya	24 May 1948	n/a	whispering campaign	n/a
Jahula	24/25 May	n/a	n/a	420
Al-'Abisiyya	25 May 1948	n/a	whispering campaign	1,510 inc. 290 Jews
Baysamun	25 May 1948	n/a	whispering campaign	20
Al-Dawwara	25 May 1948	n/a	whispering campaign	1,100 inc. 400 Jews
Al-Khisas	25 May 1948	n/a	whispering campaign	530 inc. 60 Jews
Mallaha	25 May	villagers fled	whispering campaign	890
Al-Mansura, Safad	25 May 1948	n/a	whispering campaign	360
al-Salihiyya	25 May 1948	n/a	n/a	1,520
Qadas	28/29 May changed hands 7 June, Operation Hiram	Lebanese Army	n/a	390
Al-Dirbashiyya	May 1948	n/a	n/a	310
Al-Sanbariyya	May 1948	n/a	n/a	130
Taytaba	May 1948	n/a	n/a	530

== See also ==
- Depopulated Palestinian locations in Israel

== Bibliography ==
- Walid Khalidi, All That Remains, ISBN 0-88728-224-5. Uses 1945 census for population figures.
- Benny Morris, 1948: a history of the first Arab-Israeli war, ISBN 978-0-300-12696-9.
- Benny Morris, The Birth of the Palestinian refugee problem, 1947–1949,ISBN 0-521-33028-9.
