= Al-Dirbashiyya =

Al-Dirbashiyya الدرباشية Darbashiya, al
- Village
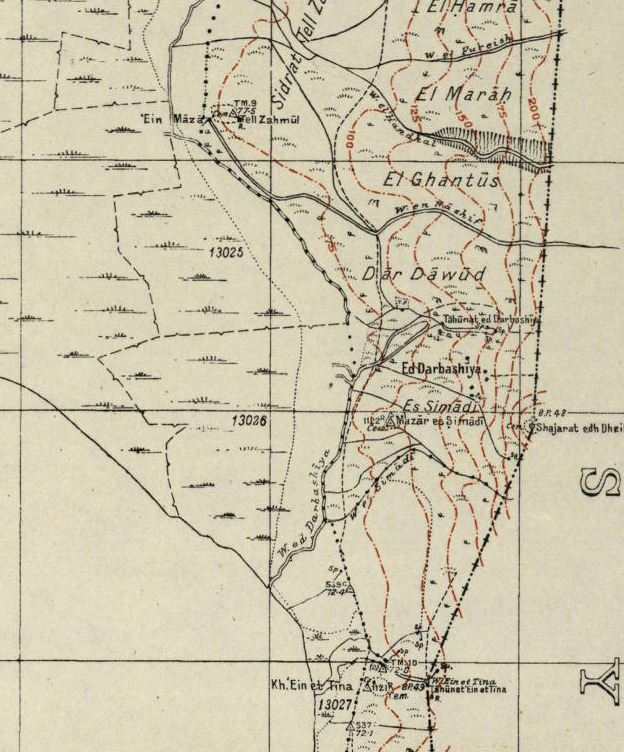
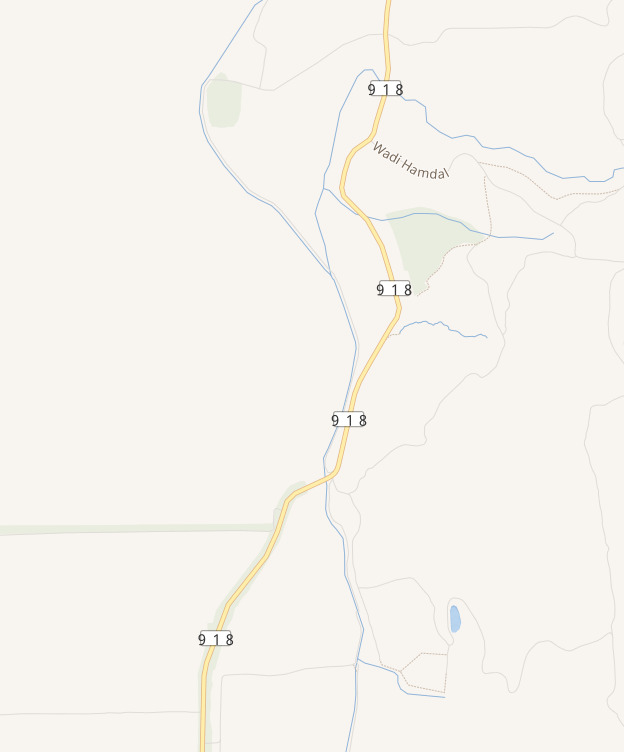
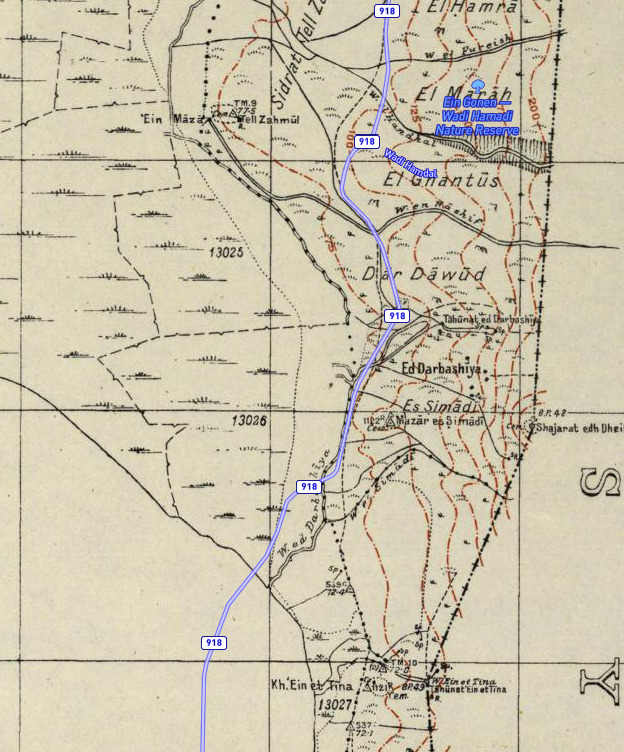
- 1940s map modern map 1940s with modern overlay map A series of historical maps of the area around Al-Dirbashiyya (click the buttons)

- Location within Mandatory Palestine
- Coordinates: 33°05′20″N 35°38′49″E
- Palestine grid: 210/277
- Geopolitical entity: Mandatory Palestine
- Subdistrict: Safad
- Date of depopulation: May, 1948

Area
  - Total: 2,883 dunams (2.883 km^{2}; 1.113 sq mi)

Population (1945)
  - Total: 310

Al-Dirbashiyya (Arabic: الدرباشية) was a Palestinian Arab village in the Safad Subdistrict. It was depopulated during the 1947–1948 Civil War in Mandatory Palestine on May 10, 1948, by the Palmach's First Battalion of Operation Yiftach. It was located 20 km northeast of Safad in the Hula Valley, bordering Hula Lake.

== Location ==
The village was located on the lower slopes of the Golan Heights near the border with Syria overlooking the Hula Valley. The lands to the west of the village were mainly marshland, although there were a few palm trees, and wooded areas to the south. A shrine named after a Muslim sage, named al-Samadi, was located between the village and Hula Lake.

== History ==
The Palestine Index Gazetteer classified the village as a hamlet and during the British Mandate the British built a police station.

The inhabitants mainly earned their living from the cultivation of vegetables.

In the 1945 statistics Ed Darbashiya had a population of 310 Muslims, with a total of 2,883 dunam of land. Of this, they used 2,763 dunums for plantations and irrigable land, while 120 dunams were classified as non-uncultivable land.

=== Post 1948 ===
Historians say that the details about the occupation of the village (during the Nakba) remain unclear. However, it is known that it was captured during Operation Yiftach in May 1948.

In 1992, the village site was described thus by historian Walid Khalidi: "The rubble of destroyed houses is scattered across the village site. The site also contains a segment of a cement-lined irrigation canal, and the remains of terraces in some fields. The village lands, which are used mainly as pastures, are covered with grass, cactus plants, and Christ’s-thorn and eucalyptus trees."

== Bibliography ==
- Department of Statistics (1945). Village Statistics, April, 1945. Government of Palestine.
- Hadawi, S. (1970). Village Statistics of 1945: A Classification of Land and Area ownership in Palestine. Palestine Liberation Organization Research Center. Archived from the original on 2018-12-08.
- Khalidi, W. (1992). All That Remains: The Palestinian Villages Occupied and Depopulated by Israel in 1948. Washington D.C.: Institute for Palestine Studies. ISBN 0-88728-224-5.
- Morris, B. (2004). The Birth of the Palestinian Refugee Problem Revisited. Cambridge University Press. ISBN 978-0-521-00967-6.
