= Baysamun =

Baysamun بيسمون Beisamun, En Besamun, Basimun
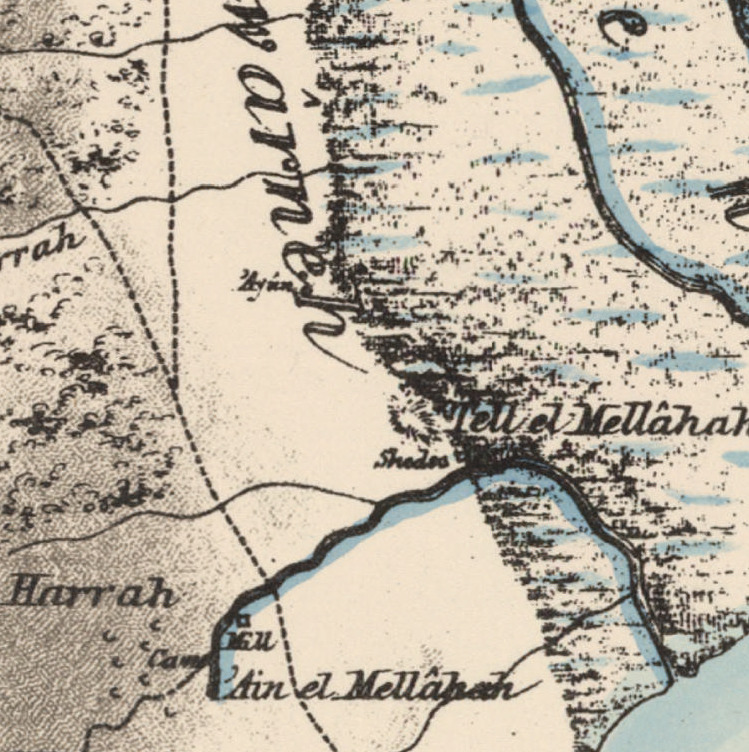
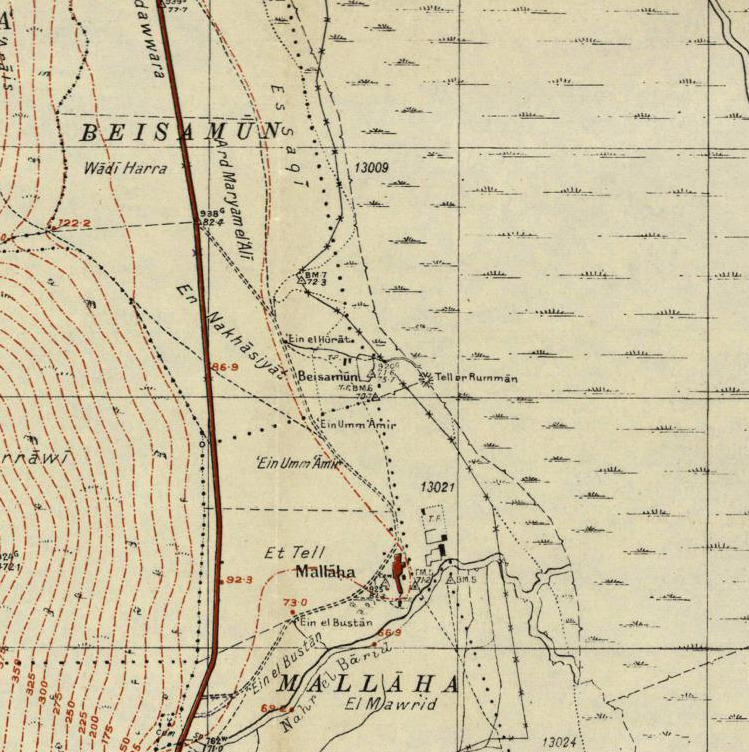
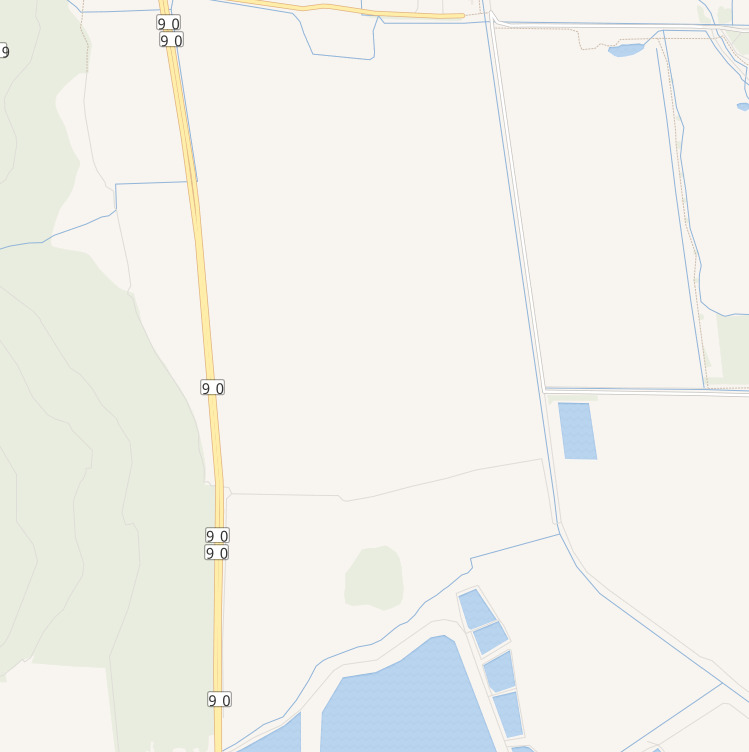
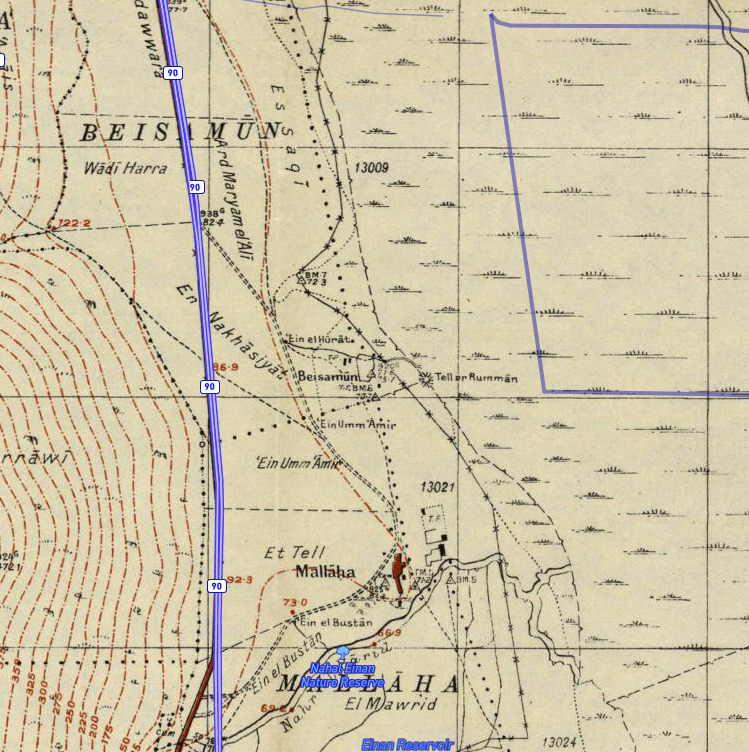
- 1870s map 1940s map modern map 1940s with modern overlay map A series of historical maps of the area around Baysamun (click the buttons)

- Location within Mandatory Palestine
- Coordinates: 33°5′51″N 35°34′54″E
- Palestine grid: 204/278
- Geopolitical entity: Mandatory Palestine
- Subdistrict: Safad
- Date of depopulation: May 25, 1948

Population (1945)
  - Total: 20
- Cause(s) of depopulation: Whispering campaign

Baysamun or Beisamoun (Arabic: بيسمون, Beisamûn) was a small Palestinian Arab village, located 16.5 kilometers (10.3 mi) in the marshy Hula Valley northeast of Safad. In 1945, it had a population of 20. It was depopulated during the 1948 War on May 25, 1948, by the Palmach's First Battalion in Operation Yiftach.

Beisamoun is an important archaeological site for the Neolithic period, with two plastered human skulls, cremation signs and house floors found there. It stood in close proximity to another major Natufian ("Final Old Stone Age") site, ʿAin Mallaha.

== History ==
=== Prehistoric and Bronze Age site ===
Beisamoun (archaeological site)
- Interactive map of Beisamoun (archaeological site)
- Periods: Pre-Pottery Neolithic B (mainly), Early Chalcolithic, Bronze Age

Kathleen Kenyon notes that Beisamoun disappeared under modern drainage systems set up by Israel; in the fish ponds created, Neolithic remains were found that included houses and two plastered skulls. Rectangular houses with plastered floors show striking similarities to those at Byblos. These "Levantine pier house[s]" were also found in Yiftahel, Ayn Ghazal, and Jericho.

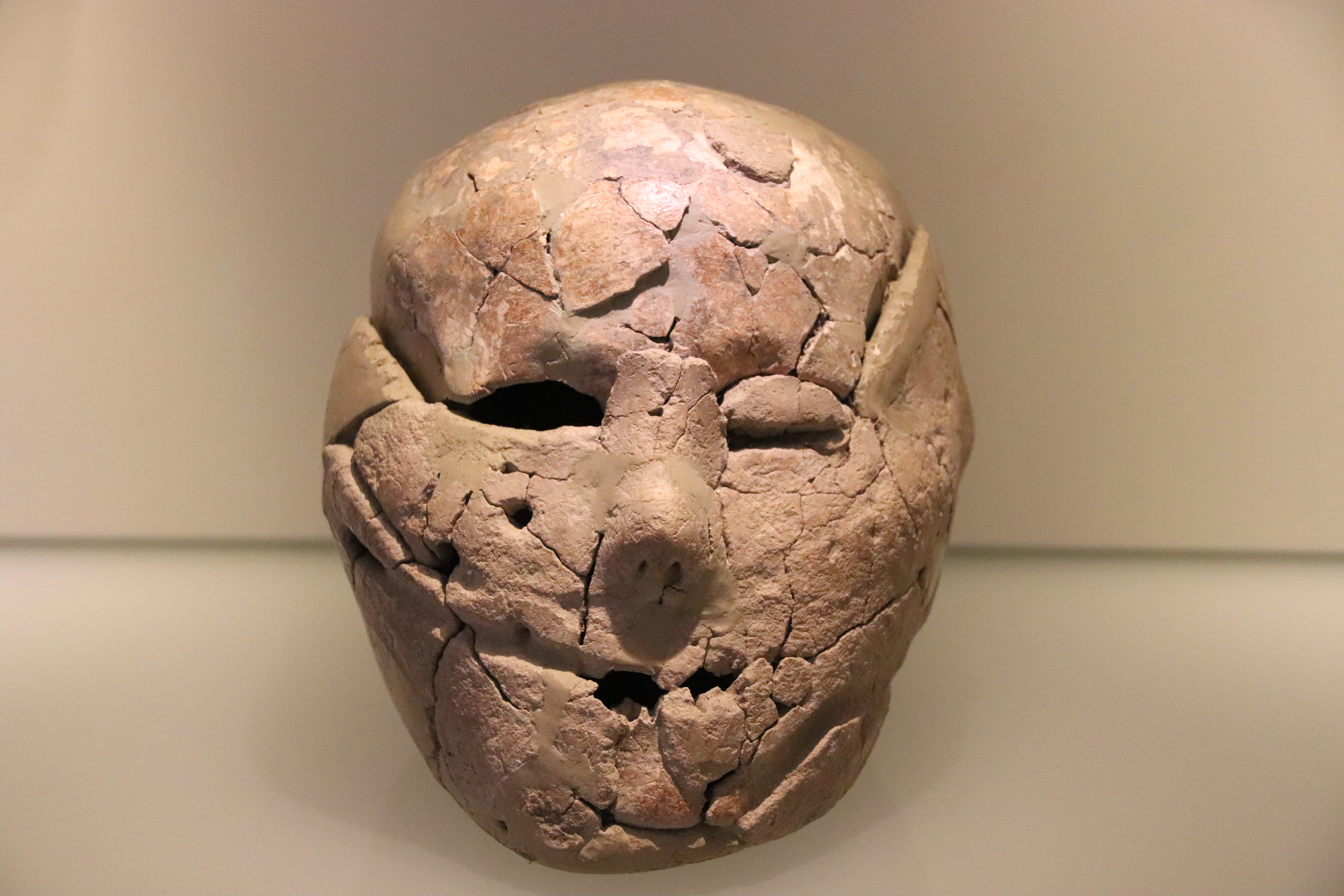
One of the plastered human skulls found at Baysamun

A main period of habitation was during the Pre-Pottery Neolithic B era, but also Early Chalcolithic and Bronze Age remains have been found.

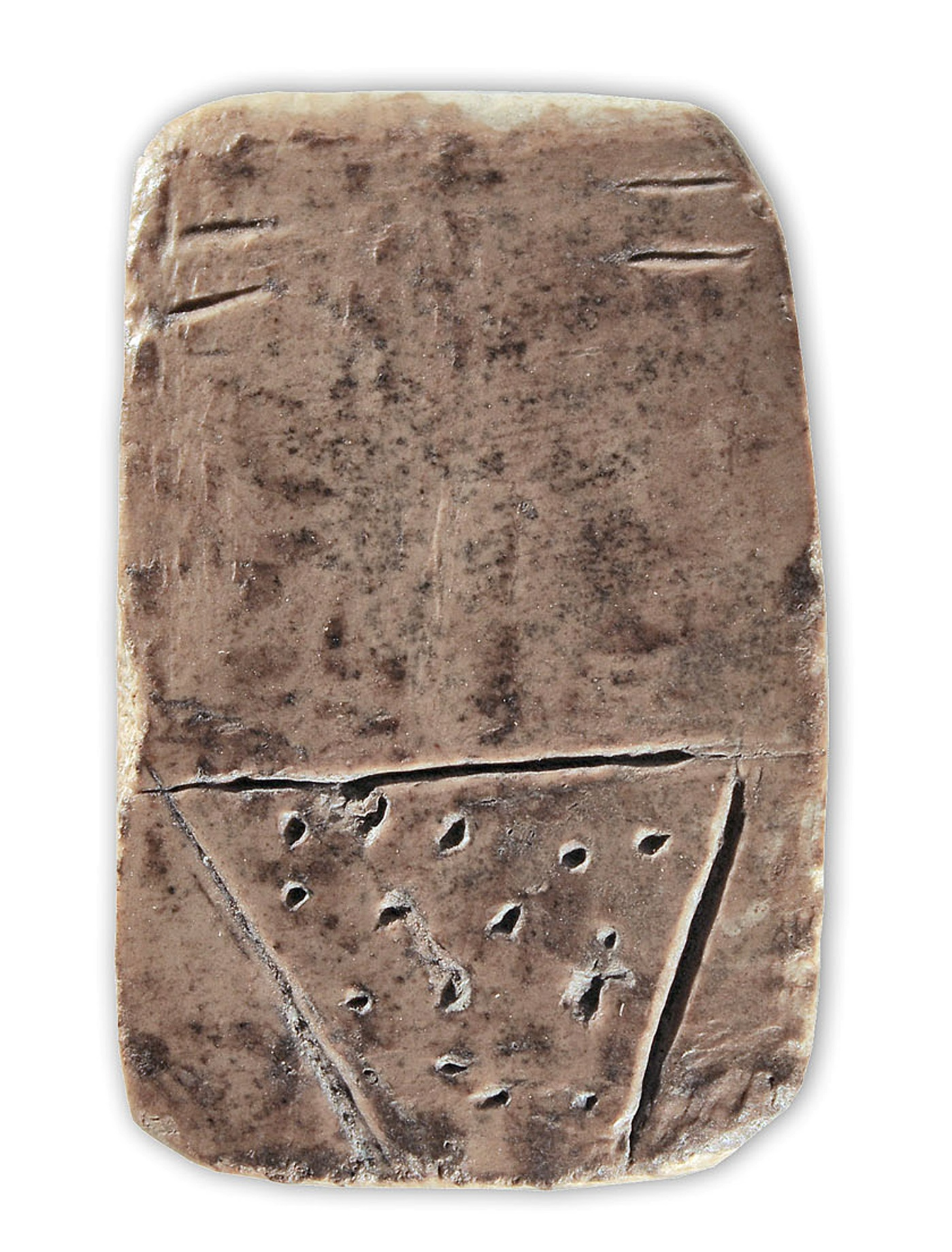
Early Chalcolithic figurine from Beisamun

=== British Mandate village ===
The population of Baysamun in the 1922 census of Palestine consisted of 41 Muslims, increasing to 50 Muslims in 11 houses by 1931.

In the 1945 statistics the population was 20 Muslims, with a total of 2,102 dunams of land, according to an official land and population survey. Of this, 107 dunams were plantations and irrigable land, 1,817 for cereals; while 133 dunams was non-cultivable area.

=== 1948, aftermath ===
It was depopulated during the 1948 War on May 25, 1948, by the Palmach's First Battalion in Operation Yiftach in a Whispering campaign.

In 1992 the village site was described: "No traces of the houses remain. The site is occupied by warehouses for agricultural implements used by Kibbutz Manara, which had been established in 1943. The land around the site is cultivated and fish ponds have been constructed close to it."

== Bibliography ==
- Barron, J. B., ed. (1923). Palestine: Report and General Abstracts of the Census of 1922. Government of Palestine.
- Department of Statistics (1945). Village Statistics, April, 1945. Government of Palestine.
- Grootkerk, Salomon E. (2000). Ancient sites in Galilee: a toponymic gazetteer (Illustrated ed.). BRILL. ISBN 978-90-04-11535-4.
- Hadawi, S. (1970). Village Statistics of 1945: A Classification of Land and Area ownership in Palestine. Palestine Liberation Organization Research Center.
- Kenyon, K. (1985). Archaeology in the Holy Land (4th, illustrated ed.). Taylor & Francis. ISBN 978-0-416-36490-3.
- Khalaily, Hamudi; Bocquentin, Fanny (2008-06-16). "Beisamoun (Mallaha)" (120). Hadashot Arkheologiyot – Excavations and Surveys in Israel.
- Khalaily, Hamudi; Barzilai, Omry; Bezal’el, Gilad (2009-12-02). "Beisamoun (Mallaha)" (121). Hadashot Arkheologiyot – Excavations and Surveys in Israel.
- Khalaily, Hamudi; Bocquentin, Fanny (2010-11-17). "Beisamoun (Mallaha)" (122). Hadashot Arkheologiyot – Excavations and Surveys in Israel.
- Khalaily, Hamudi; Bocquentin, Fanny (2012-08-13). "Beisamoun (Mallaha)" (124). Hadashot Arkheologiyot – Excavations and Surveys in Israel.
- Khalidi, W. (1992). All That Remains: The Palestinian Villages Occupied and Depopulated by Israel in 1948. Washington D.C.: Institute for Palestine Studies. ISBN 0-88728-224-5.
- Mills, E., ed. (1932). Census of Palestine 1931. Population of Villages, Towns and Administrative Areas. Jerusalem: Government of Palestine.
- Morris, B. (2004). The Birth of the Palestinian Refugee Problem Revisited. Cambridge University Press. ISBN 978-0-521-00967-6.
- Negev, Avraham; Gibson, S. (2005). Archaeological encyclopedia of the Holy Land (4th, revised, illustrated ed.). Continuum International Publishing Group. ISBN 978-0-8264-8571-7.
- Wright, G. R. H. (1985). Ancient Building in South Syria and Palestine. Brill Archive. ISBN 978-90-04-07091-2.
