= Yiftahel =

Coordinates: 32°45′19.35″N 35°13′39.81″E

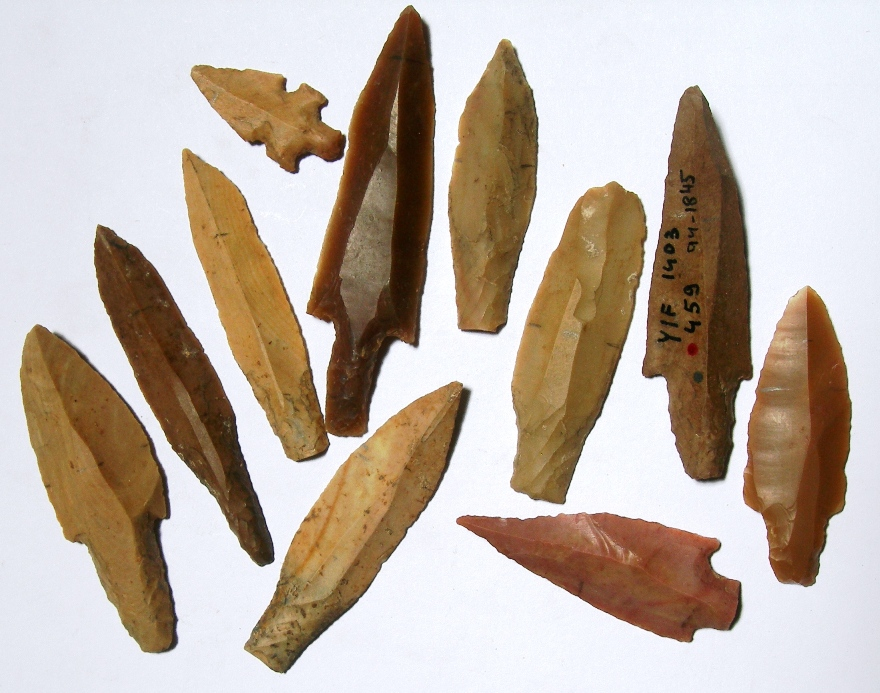
Yiftahel Pre-Pottery Neolithic B flint arrowheads.

Yiftahel (Hebrew: יפתחאל) is an archaeological site located in the Lower Galilee in northern Israel. Various salvage excavations took place here between 1992 and 2008. The best known periods of occupation are the Early Bronze Age I and Pre-Pottery Neolithic B.

In the Early Bronze Age village ca. 20 oval and rounded structures were uncovered. This is regarded as the most typical village of its period in the southern Levant.

The Pre-Pottery Neolithic B village is characterized by rectangular architecture and plastered floors of burnt limestone. One of the most important processes underway during the Neolithic period was the shift from a hunter-gatherer economy to early agriculture. The finds from Yiftahel shed light on the domestication of both animals and plants. Yiftahel produced over 1,000,000 lentils, an enormous quantity, clearly indicating controlled cultivation. The most important agricultural finding here, however, is the earliest appearance of domesticated fava bean seeds.

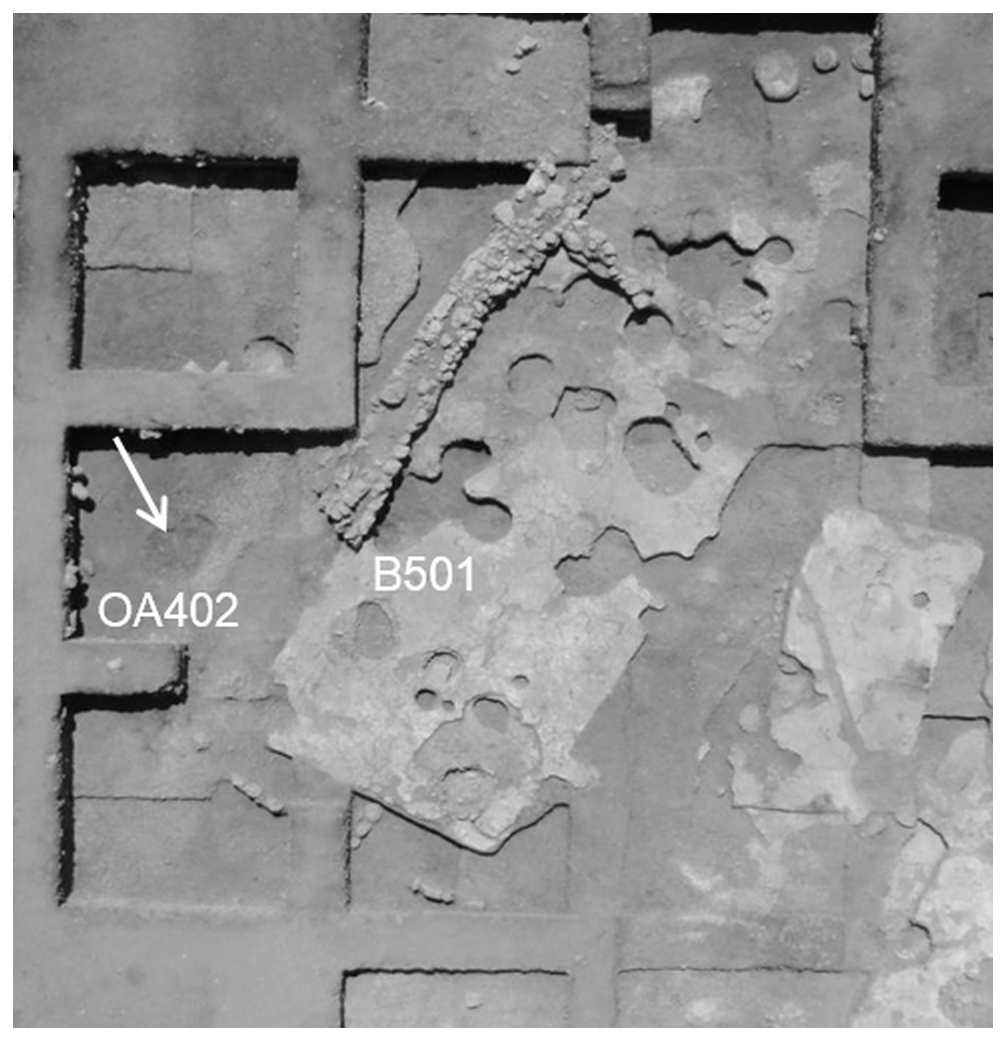
Aerial photograph of Area I in the site of Yiftahel

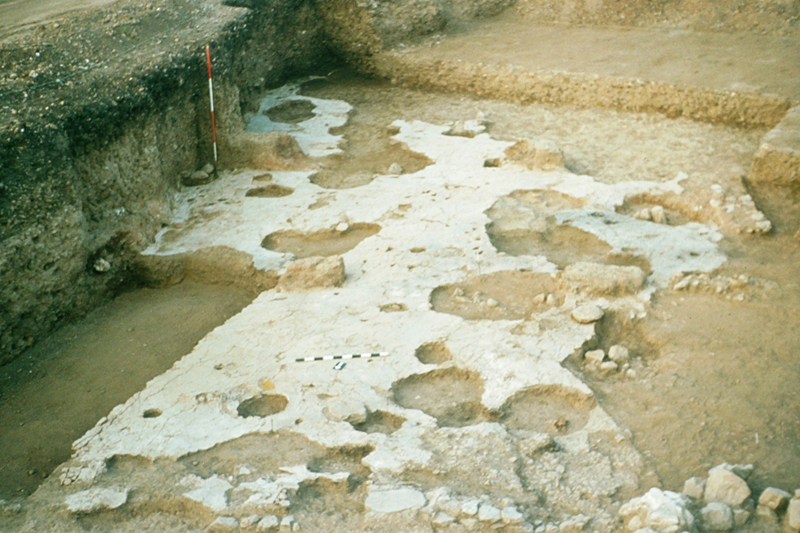
Yiftahel structure with plastered floor.

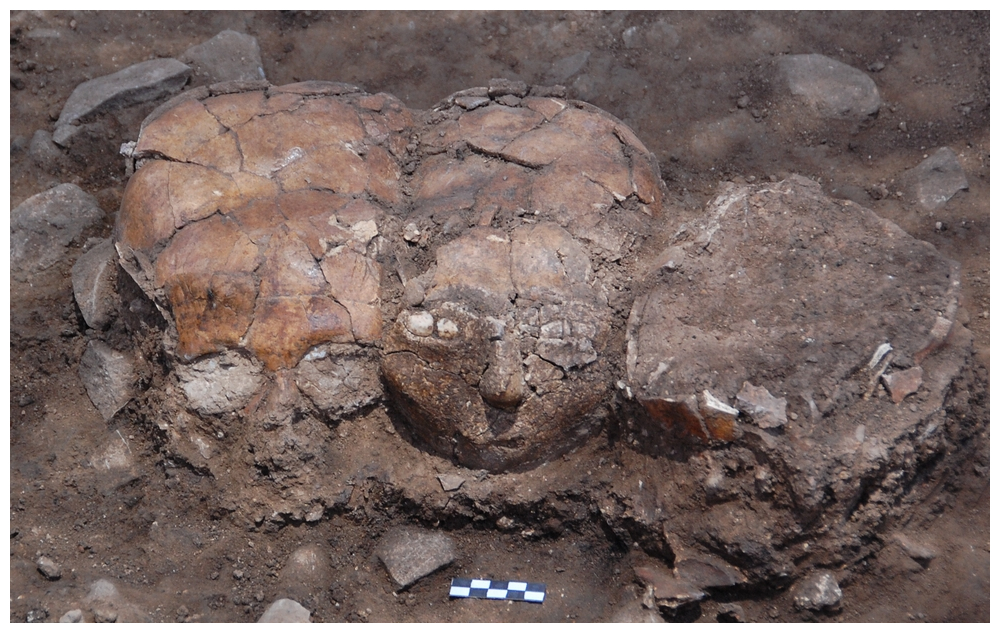
The three plastered skulls in situ at Yiftahel

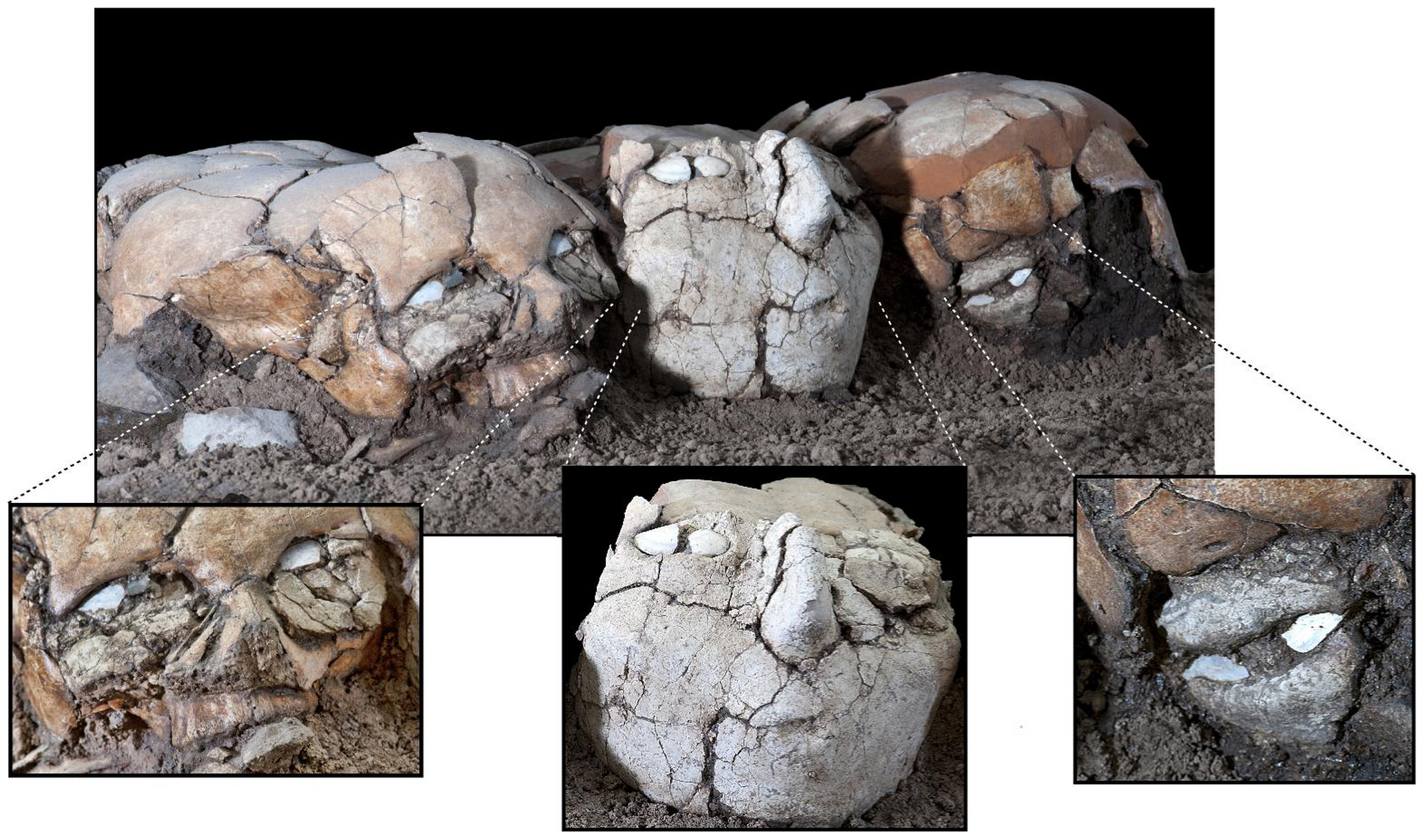
The three plastered skulls, following reconstruction and preservation processes at Yiftahel
