= Hazor Natural Region =

Coordinates: 32°58′19″N 35°34′7″E

- Natural Region
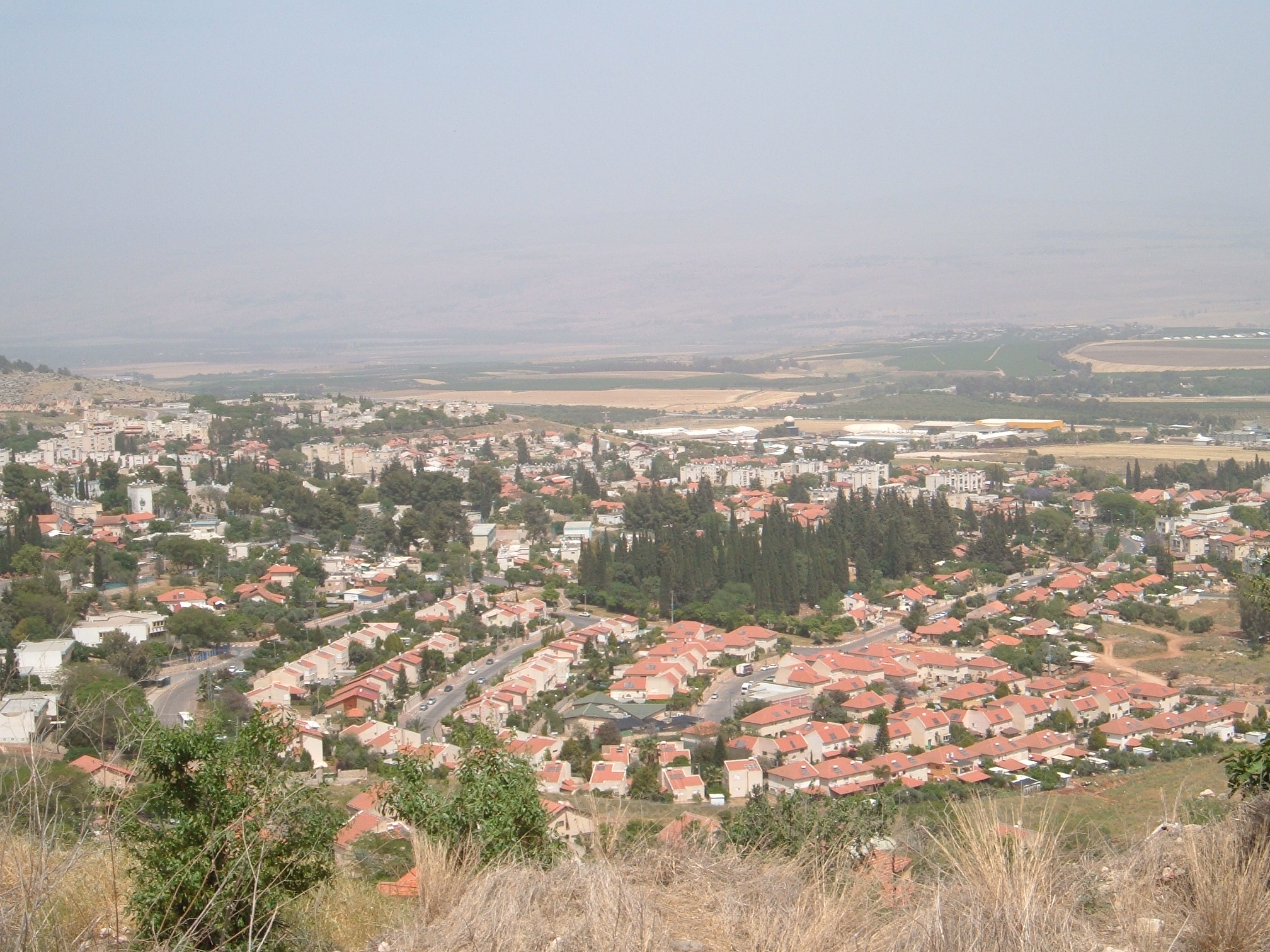
- View of Hatzor HaGlilit, the largest city in the Hazor Natural Region
- Interactive map of Hazor Natural Region
- Country: Israel
- District: Northern
- Subdistrict: Safed
- Largest City: Hatzor HaGlilit

Area
  - Total: 102 km^{2} (39 sq mi)

Population (2024)
  - Total: 27,529

Ethnicity
  - Jews and others: 71.2%
  - Arabs: 26.6%

The Hazor Natural Region is a natural region in the Safed Subdistrict, in the Northern District of Israel. Hatzor HaGlilit is the largest town in the natural region.

== Geography ==
Districts, Subdistricts and Natural Regions of the State of Israel, 2018

The natural region is located north of the Sea of Galilee, south of the Hula Valley, east of Safed, and west of the Golan Heights. It contains most of the Korazim Plateau, along with its namesake archaeological site Tel Hazor. It has an area of 102 km^{2}. The largest town in the natural region is Hatzor HaGlilit, which contains 40 percent of the natural region's population. Two other notable towns in the natural area are Rosh Pinna, the first modern Jewish town in the area, and Tuba-Zangariyye, a Bedouin town. The natural region contains portions of the Upper Galilee and Mevo'ot HaHermon regional councils.

== Demographics ==
71 percent of the residents of the Hazor Natural Region are Jewish. 27 percent of residents are Arab, concentrated in the town of Tuba-Zangariyye.

Historical population
Year	Pop.	±%
1972	7,400	—
1983	8,700	+17.6%
1995	12,500	+43.7%
2008	21,230	+69.8%
2022	26,671	+25.6%
2024	27,529	+3.2%

== Administrative local authorities ==
Cities	Local Councils	Villages
[None]	Hatzor HaGlilit; Rosh Pinna; Tuba-Zangariyye	Mevo'ot HaHermon: Amnun; Elifelet; Karkom; Korazim; Mishmar HaYarden; Upper Galilee: Ami'ad; Gadot; Kfar HaNassi; Mahanayim

== Voting Patterns ==
In the 2022 election, 54 percent of voters in the natural region voted for the parties of the right-wing coalition led by Benjamin Netanyahu, while 28 percent voted for the parties of the center-left coalition led by Yair Lapid and 16 percent voted for the Arab parties.

In the 2026 election, 45 percent of voters in the natural region voted for the parties of the right-wing coalition led by Benjamin Netanyahu, while 27 percent voted for the parties of the center-left coalition led by Gadi Eisenkot and 24 percent voted for the Arab parties. An additional 2 percent voted for the Reservists, and 1.1 percent voted for Amcha Yisrael. Voter turnout increased 26 percent from the 2022 election.
