= Hula Valley Natural Region =

Coordinates: 33°12′53″N 35°34′25″E

- Natural Region
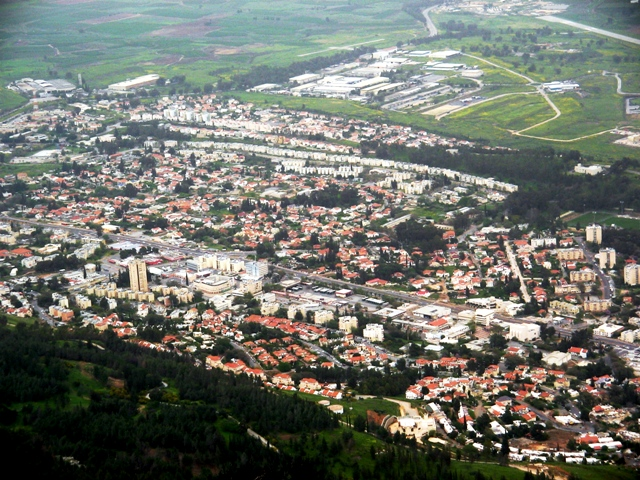
- View of Kiryat Shmona, the largest city in the Hula Valley Natural Region
- Interactive map of Hula Valley Natural Region
- Country: Israel
- District: Northern
- Subdistrict: Safed
- Largest City: Kiryat Shmona

Area
  - Total: 234 km^{2} (90 sq mi)

Population (2024)
  - Total: 46,202

Ethnicity
  - Jews and others: 94.9%
  - Arabs: 2.9%

The Hula Valley Natural Region is a natural region in the Safed Subdistrict, in the Northern District of Israel. Kiryat Shmona is the largest city in the natural region.

== Geography ==
Districts, Subdistricts and Natural Regions of the State of Israel, 2018

As its name suggests, the natural region consists of the Hula Valley, an agricultural region in northeastern Israel, bordering Lebanon and the Golan Heights. It has an area of 234 km^{2}. The upper Jordan River flows through the Hula Valley on its way south to the Sea of Galilee. The largest city in the natural region is Kiryat Shmona, which contains 53 percent of the natural region's population. The only other town in the natural region with more than 2,000 people is Metula, the northernmost town in Israel. The natural region contains portions of the Upper Galilee and Mevo'ot HaHermon regional councils.

== Demographics ==
The vast majority of residents of the Hula Valley Natural Region are Jewish. Three percent of residents are Arab, most of whom live in Kiryat Shmona.

Historical population
| Year | Pop. | ±% |
|---|---|---|
| 1972 | 22,200 | — |
| 1983 | 24,600 | +10.8% |
| 1995 | 28,500 | +15.9% |
| 2008 | 38,100 | +33.7% |
| 2022 | 43,070 | +13.0% |
| 2024 | 46,202 | +7.3% |

== Administrative local authorities ==
| Cities | Local Councils | Villages |
|---|---|---|
| Kiryat Shmona | Metula; Yesud HaMa'ala | Mevo'ot HaHermon: Beit Hillel; Sde Eliezer; She'ar Yashuv; Yuval; Upper Galilee: Amir; Ayelet HaShahar; Dafna; Dan; Gonen; HaGoshrim; Hulata; Kfar Blum; Kfar Giladi; Kfar Szold; Lehavot HaBashan; Ma'ayan Baruch; Ne'ot Mordechai; Sde Nehemia; Snir; Shamir |

== Voting Patterns ==
In the 2022 election, 48.5 percent of voters in the natural region voted for the parties of the right-wing coalition led by Benjamin Netanyahu, while 48.4 percent voted for the parties of the center-left coalition led by Yair Lapid and 0.3 percent voted for the Arab parties.

In the 2026 election, 50 percent of voters in the natural region voted for the parties of the center-left coalition led by Gadi Eisenkot, while 44 percent voted for the parties of the right-wing coalition led by Benjamin Netanyahu and 0.7 percent voted for the Arab parties. An additional 3.3 percent voted for the Reservists, and 2.2 percent voted for Amcha Yisrael. Voter turnout increased 13 percent from the 2022 election.
