= Kfar HaNassi =

Kfar HaNassi: כפר הנשיא (Hebrew)
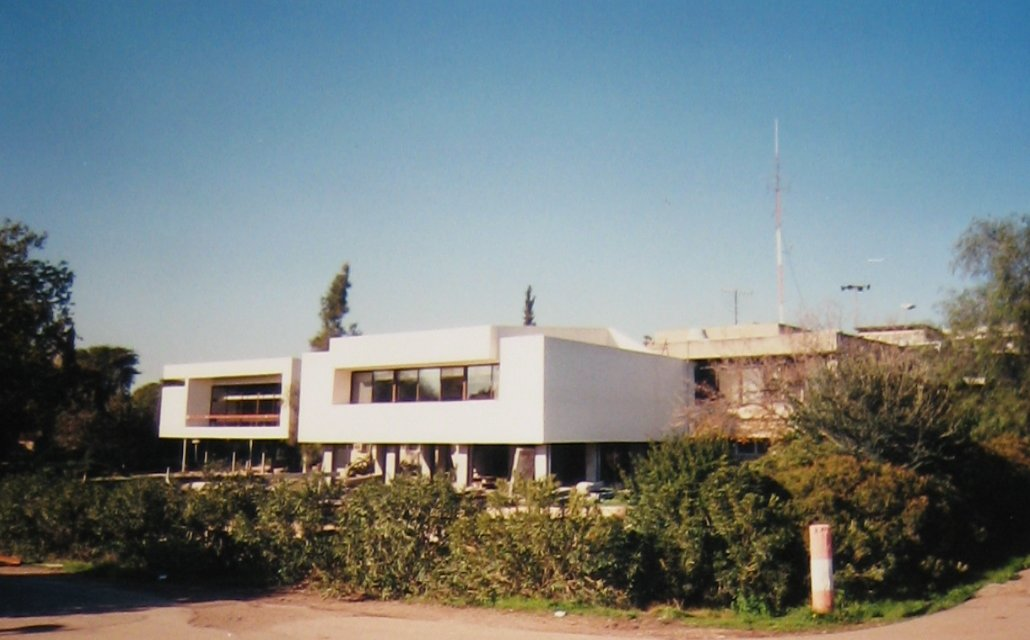

- Location within Northeast Israel
- Coordinates: 32°58′30″N 35°36′14″E
- Country: Israel
- District: Northern
- Subdistrict: Safed
- Council: Upper Galilee
- Affiliation: Kibbutz Movement
- Founded: 1948
- Founder: British Habonim Members
- Population (2024): 825
- Website: www.kfar-hanassi.org.il

Kfar HaNassi (Hebrew: כפר הנשיא, lit. 'President's Village') is a kibbutz in northern Israel. Located in the Korazim Plateau, 35 km north of the Sea of Galilee, and 6 km east of Rosh Pinna (near the hilly section of the Jordan River), it falls under the jurisdiction of Upper Galilee Regional Council. In 2024 it had a population of 825.

== History ==
The kibbutz was founded in 1948 by a group of British Jewish immigrants, members of the Habonim movement. Named Kibbutz HaBonim at first, the name was later changed to Kfar HaNassi, after Chaim Weizmann, the first President of Israel.

In 2007, Kfar HaNassi had 300 members, many kibbutz-born children, and a large group of residents who live on the premises.

Boris Johnson was a volunteer at the kibbutz in the 1980s.

== Economy ==
In the 1980s, the kibbutz economy was based on poultry and sheep farming, a valve factory, and apple orchards. Later, it opened a guesthouse with country lodging.

Originally the National Water Carrier of Israel was supposed begin from the Jordan right next to Kfar Hanassi. The plan was to get the water from there and use some of the excess amount to produce hydroelectricity by flowing them back down to the Sea of Galilee. In 1953 work began at the site on a canal for the water of the National Carrier. However, it had to be abandoned due to objections by the Syrians. In 1992 Kfar Hanassi along with other partners built a hydroelectric power plant. Water flow through the first kilometer of that canal and then down through a turbine and back to the Jordan. Due to many protests that this may dry out that section of the Jordan, the operators had to guarantee a minimal flow of water in the original river's channel.

== Notable people ==
- Boris Johnson, volunteered at the kibbutz for approximately two months c. 1984
- Tom Maayan (born 1993), basketball player in the Israeli National League
