= Karkom =

Karkom: כַּרְכֹּם (Hebrew)
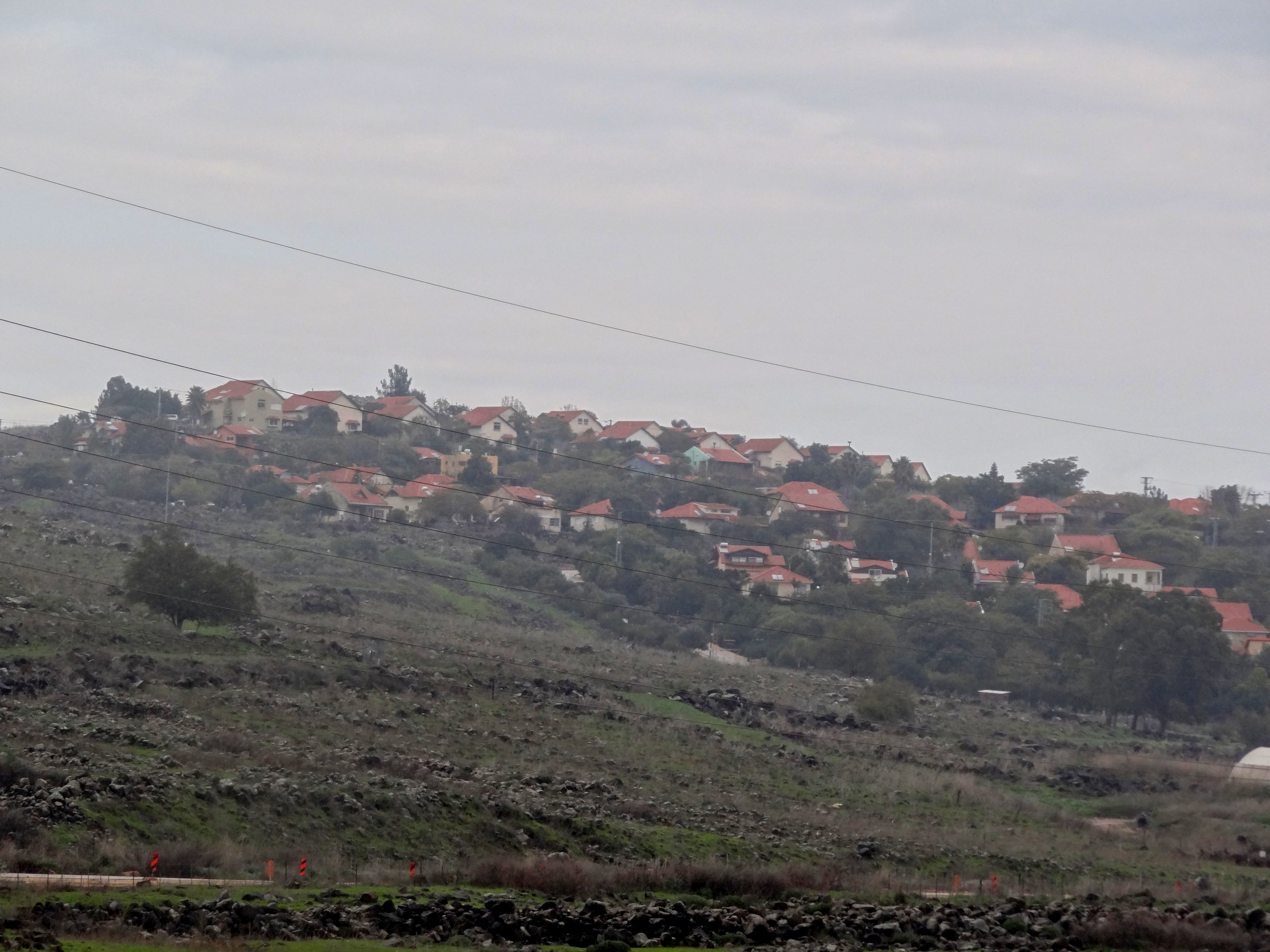

- Location within Northeast Israel
- Coordinates: 32°55′50″N 35°36′29″E
- Country: Israel
- District: Northern
- Subdistrict: Safed
- Council: Mevo'ot HaHermon
- Affiliation: HaMerkaz HaHakla'i
- Founded: 1986
- Founder: Moshavniks
- Population (2024): 445
- Website: karkom.org

Karkom (Hebrew: כַּרְכֹּם, כרכום) is a community settlement in northern Israel. Located in the Korazim Plateau, near the Jordan River, east of Hatzor HaGlilit and just north of the Sea of Galilee, it falls under the jurisdiction of Mevo'ot HaHermon Regional Council. In 2024 it had a population of 445.

== History ==
The community was founded in 1986 by residents of nearby moshavim. 160 families live in Karkom. The community is named after an old settlement in antiquity in the area that was also called "Karkom."
