= Kahal =

Kahal: כחל (Hebrew)
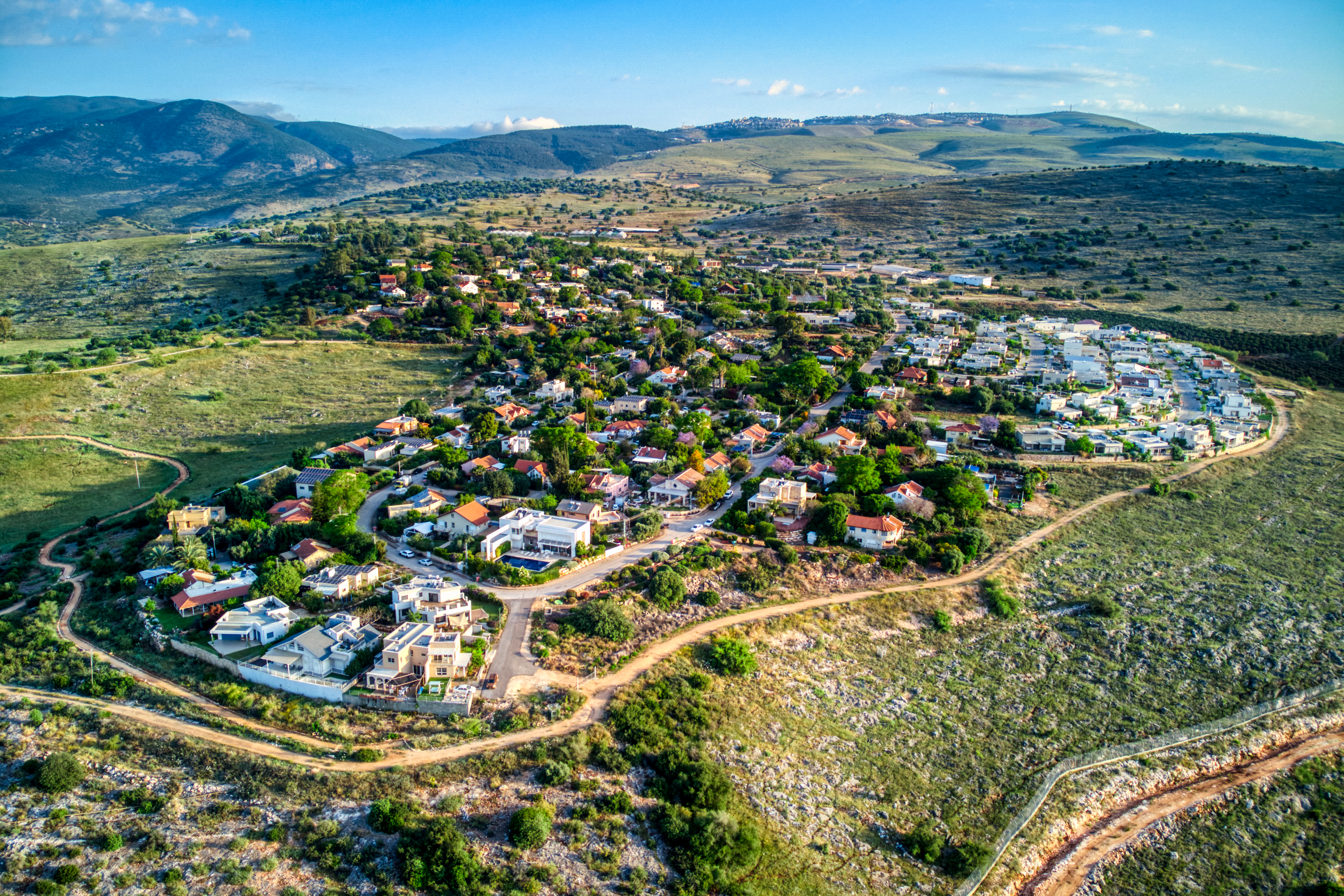

- Location within Northeast Israel Location within Israel
- Coordinates: 32°53′30″N 35°30′35″E
- Country: Israel
- District: Northern
- Subdistrict: Safed
- Council: Mevo'ot HaHermon
- Affiliation: Moshavim Movement
- Founded: 1980
- Population (2024): 504

Kahal (Hebrew: כחל) is a moshav near Highway 85 in northern Israel. Located on the border of the Upper Galilee and Lower Galilee, north of Sea of Galilee and just northwest of Tabgha, it falls under the jurisdiction of Mevo'ot HaHermon Regional Council. In 2024 it had a population of 504.
