= Ayelet HaShahar =

Ayelet HaShahar: איילת השחר (Hebrew)
- Kibbutz

Hebrew transcription(s)
  - Official: Ayyelet HaShahar
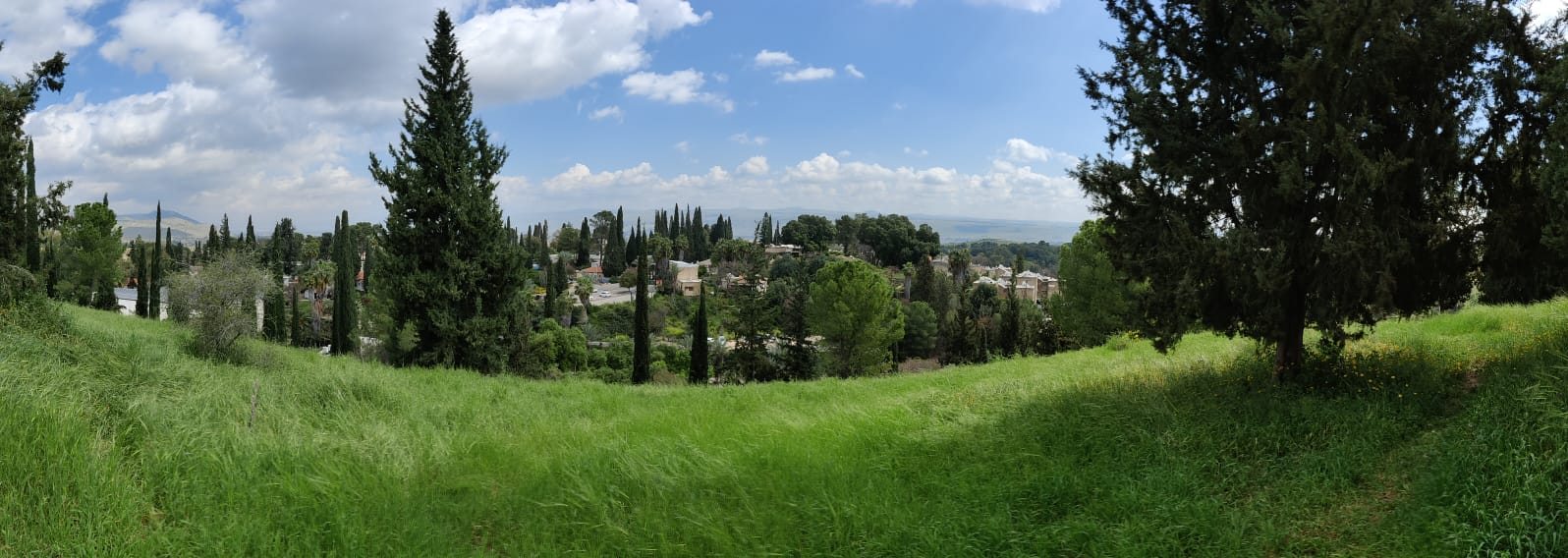
- Etymology: Hind of the Dawn
- Location within Northeast Israel Location within Israel
- Coordinates: 33°1′22″N 35°34′39″E
- Country: Israel
- District: Northern
- Subdistrict: Safed
- Council: Upper Galilee
- Affiliation: Kibbutz Movement
- Founded: 1915
- Founder: Ashkenazi Jewish immigrants
- Population (2024): 1,105
- Website: ayelet.org.il

Ayelet HaShahar (Hebrew: איילת השחר, lit. 'Hind of the Dawn') is a kibbutz in northern Israel acquired in 1892 and settled in the second Aliyah, located on the Korazim Plateau, by the Rosh Pinna – Metulla road, it is approximately 35 kilometres (22 mi) south of the city of Kiryat Shmona and falls under the jurisdiction of Upper Galilee Regional Council. In 2024, it had a population of 1,105.

== Etymology ==
The name of the kibbutz, literally Hind of the Dawn, is taken from the first line of Psalm 22

== History ==
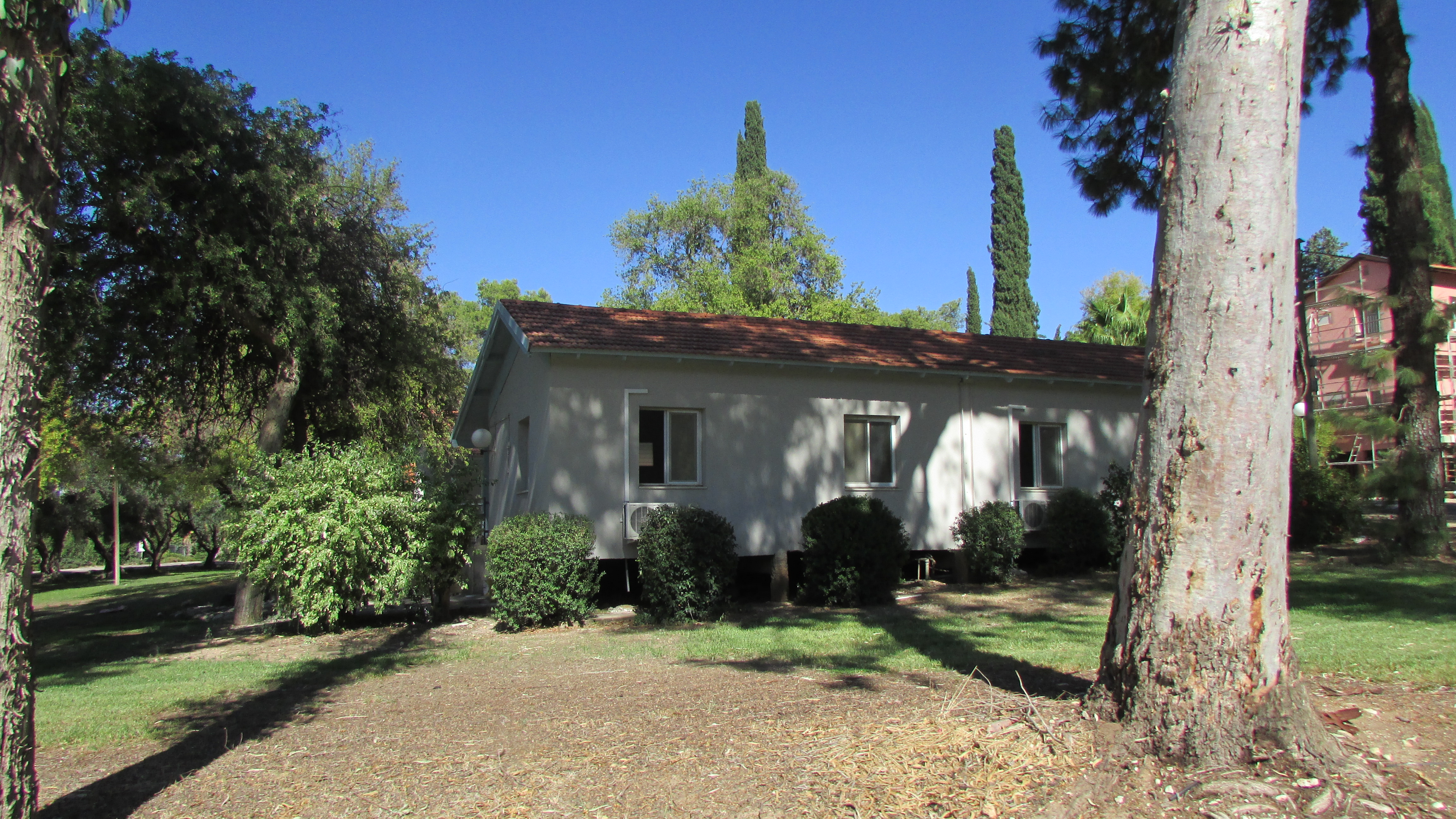
House in Ayelet HaShahar

The land was bought by the Jewish Colonization Association in 1892, and first settled by immigrants from Europe in 1915 during the Second Aliyah period. A census conducted in 1922 by the British Mandate authorities, recorded a population of 78 Jews. During the end of the British mandate, the kibbutz was the staging ground for Palmach operations: Night of the Bridges and the bombing of the Yarmuk Bridge (16–17 June 1946).

After the 1948 Arab-Israeli War, Ayelet HaShahar absorbed land near the newly depopulated Palestinian village of Yarda.

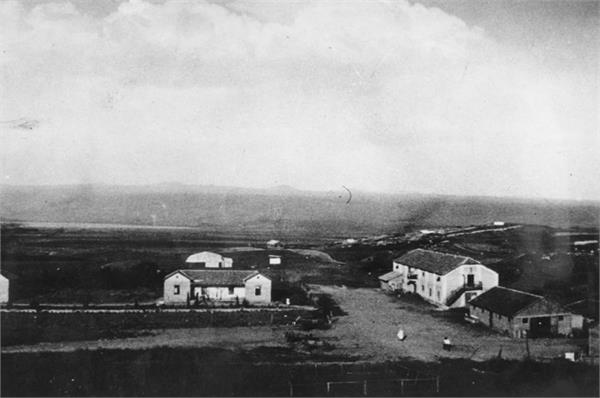
Ayelet HaShahar, 1919

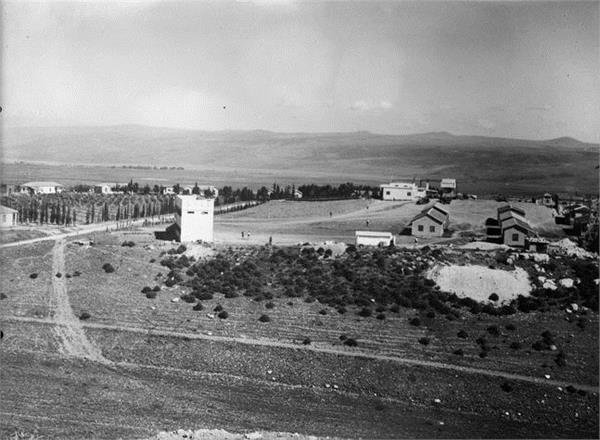
Ayelet HaShahar, 1937

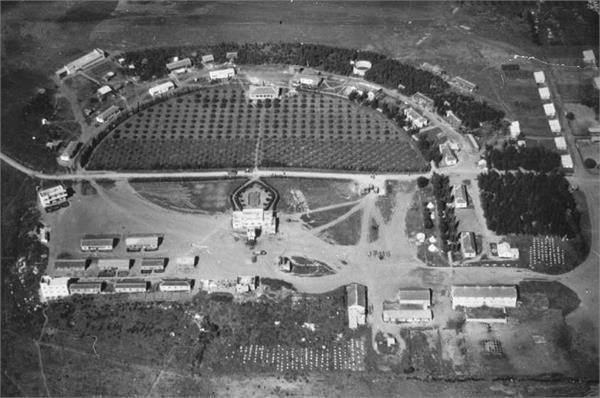
Ayelet HaShahar, 1939

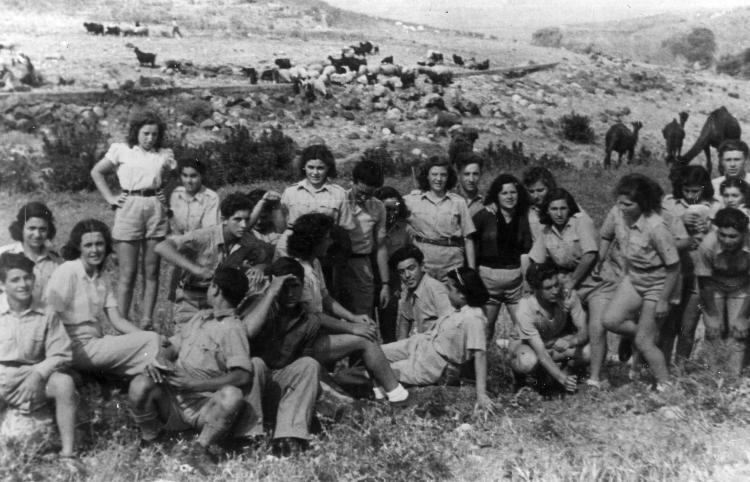
Palmach youth group at Ayelet Hashahar, 1946

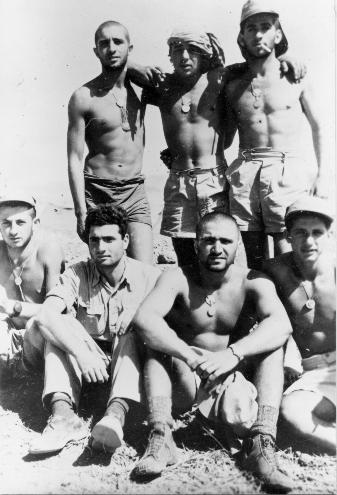
Yiftach 3rd Battalion. Ayelet HaShahar, 1948

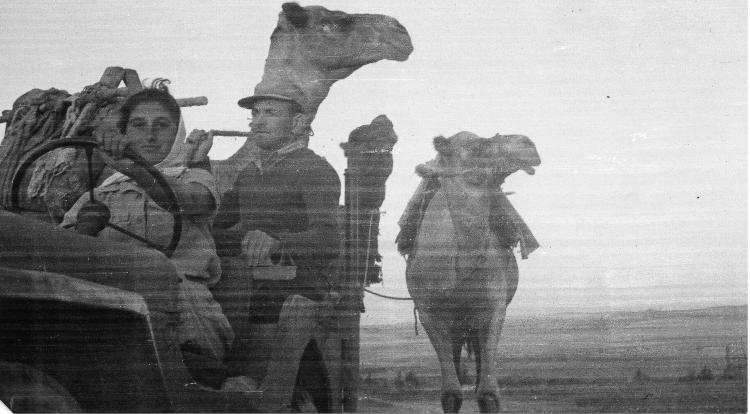
Collecting stray camels. Ayelet HaShahar, 1948

== Economy ==
Ayelet HaShahar is one of the larger fruit producers in Israel. They also raise dairy cattle and poultry, and manage beehives (the kibbutz is a major producer of Israel's honey). There are fish ponds, which take water from canals that drain the nearby Hula Valley swamps.

== Landmarks ==
Tel Hazor, the capital of Canaanite Galilee, lies opposite the kibbutz. The Archaeological Museum of Hatzor is located at the kibbutz. Antiquities from Tel Hazor are displayed, but many of the original artifacts are actually at the Israel Museum in Jerusalem.

== Notable people ==
- Suki Lahav (born 1951), singer, songwriter, violinist, actress and novelist
- Avshalom Okashi (1916–1980), artist

== Bibliography ==
- Barron, J. B., ed. (1923). Palestine: Report and General Abstracts of the Census of 1922. Government of Palestine.
