= Tziv'on =

Tziv'on: צבעון (Hebrew)
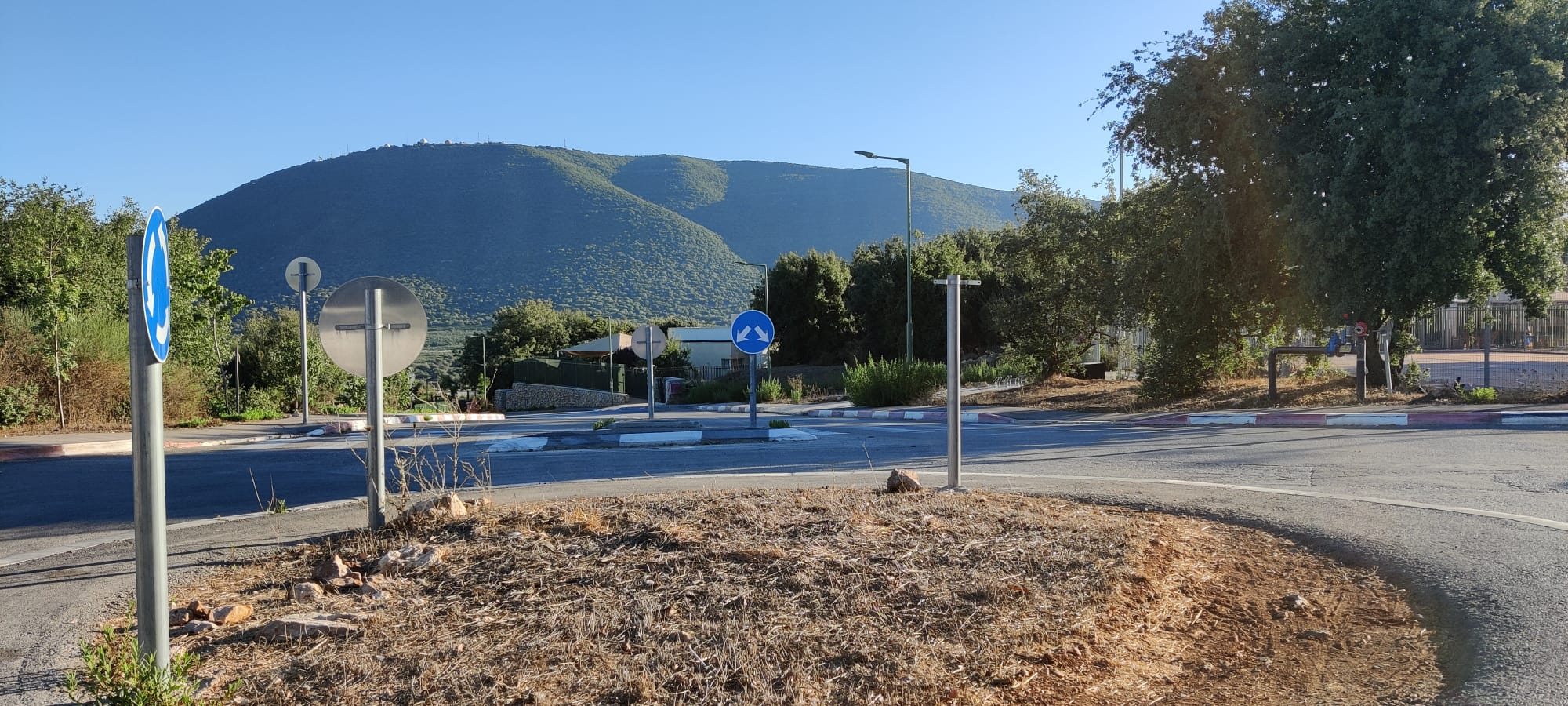
- Etymology: Crayon
- Location within Northeast Israel Location within Israel
- Coordinates: 33°1′34″N 35°24′57″E
- Country: Israel
- District: Northern
- Subdistrict: Acre
- Council: Upper Galilee
- Affiliation: Kibbutz Movement
- Founded: 1980
- Founder: Nahal
- Population (2024): 450
- Website: www.tzivon.com

Tziv'on (Hebrew: צבעון, lit. 'Crayon') is a kibbutz in northern Israel. Located near Safed and the Lebanese border, it falls under the jurisdiction of Upper Galilee Regional Council. In 2024 it had a population of 450.

== History ==
The village was established in 1980 as a Nahal settlement, and was civilianised in 1986. It was named after the nearby Tziv'on Stream.
