= Mishmar HaYarden =

Mishmar HaYarden: משמר הירדן (Hebrew)
- Moshav
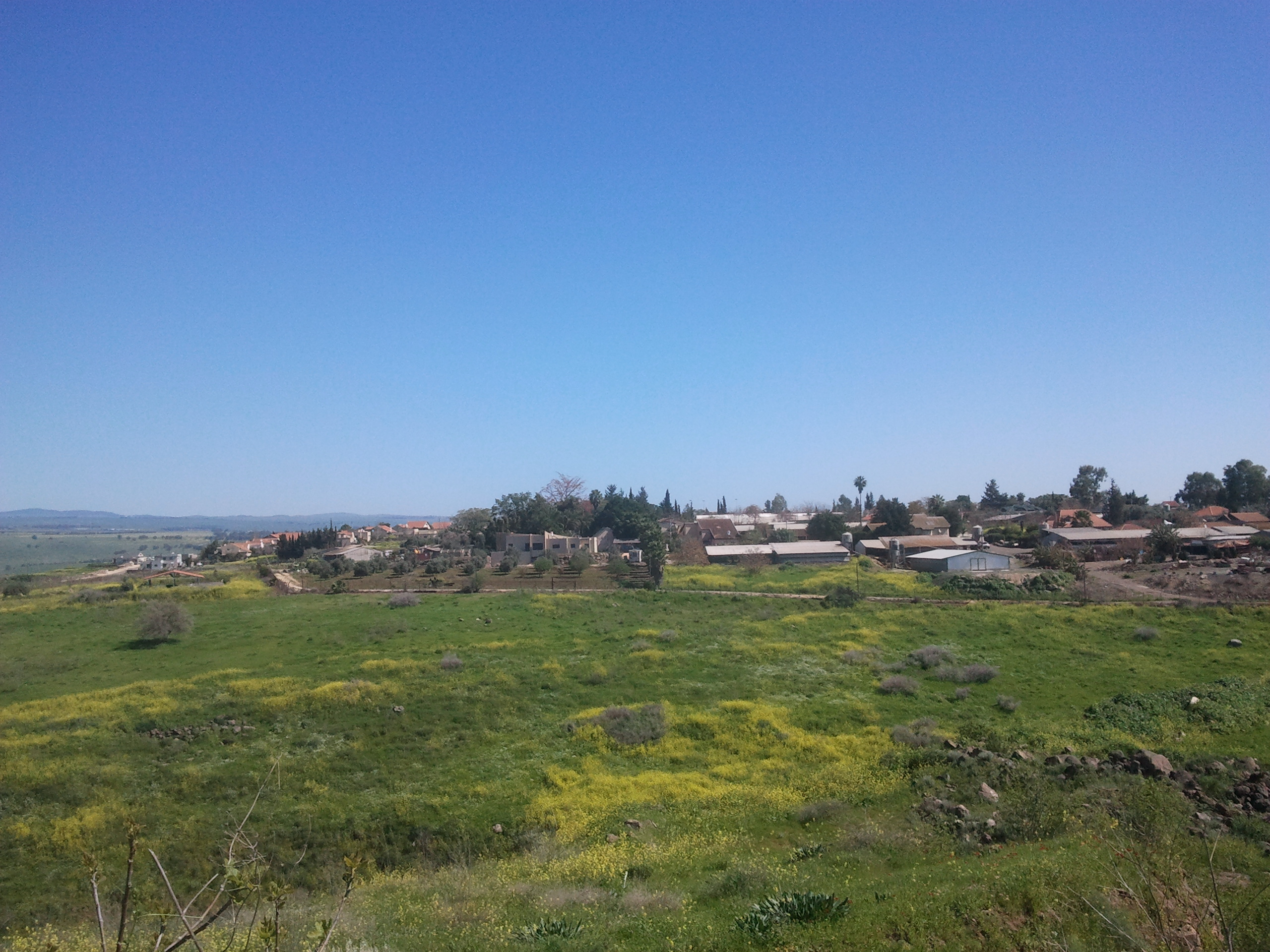
- Etymology: Guard of the Jordan
- Location within Northeast Israel Location within Israel
- Coordinates: 33°0′18″N 35°35′56″E
- Country: Israel
- District: Northern
- Subdistrict: Safed
- Council: Mevo'ot HaHermon
- Affiliation: Mishkei Herut Beitar
- Founded: 1949
- Founder: "Mishmar" members
- Population (2024): 962

Mishmar HaYarden (Hebrew: משמר הירדן, lit. 'Guard of the Jordan') is a moshav in northern Israel. Located in the Korazim Plateau, on Highway 91 between Mahanayim and Gadot, it falls under the jurisdiction of Mevo'ot HaHermon Regional Council. In 2024 it had a population of 962.

== History ==
Mishmar HaYarden was founded in 1949 on land near the newly depopulated Palestinian village of Yarda.

Mishmar HaYarden was originally named "Bnei Tzfat" because the founding nucleus supported the people of Safed (Tzfat) and respected them for planning in the 1870s to establish moshavot in the Bashan, including the old Bnei Yehuda. It was later renamed after the Mishmar HaYarden moshava, which had been destroyed during the 1948 Arab–Israeli War.
