= Sde Eliezer =

Moshav in northern Israel

Sde Eliezer: שְׂדֵה אֱלִיעֶזֶר (Hebrew)
- Moshav
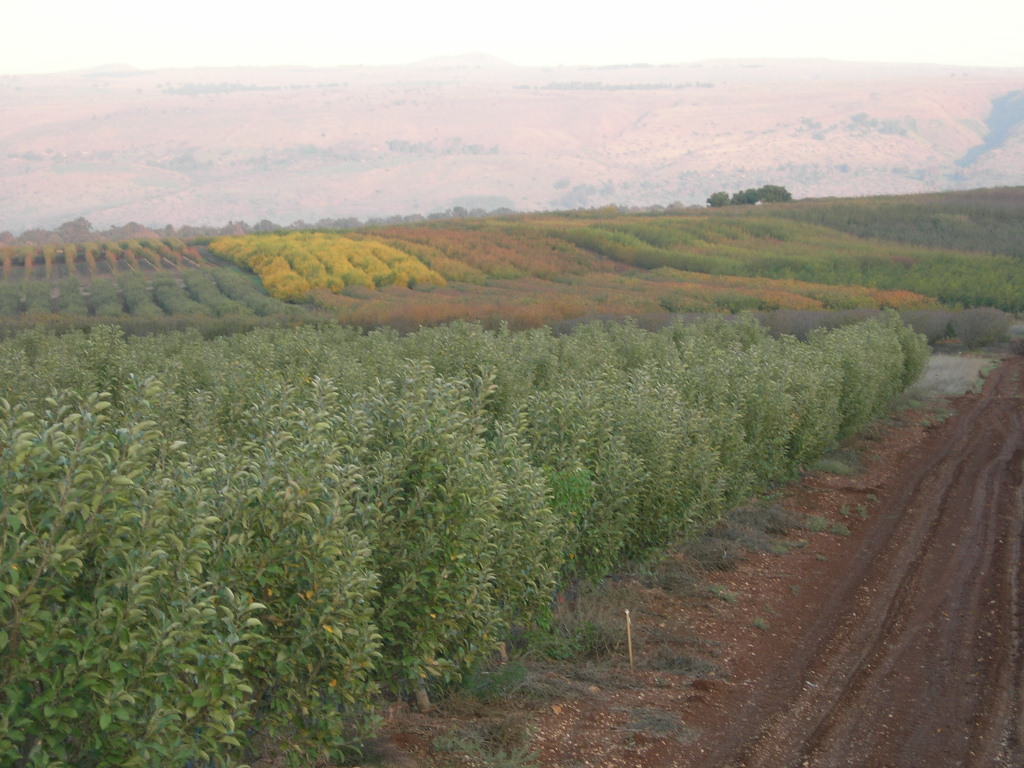
- Orchards of Sde Eliezer

- Location within Northeast Israel
- Coordinates: 33°2′43″N 35°33′50″E
- Country: Israel
- District: Northern
- Subdistrict: Safed
- Council: Mevo'ot HaHermon
- Affiliation: HaOved HaTzioni
- Founded: 1950
- Population (2024): 1,005

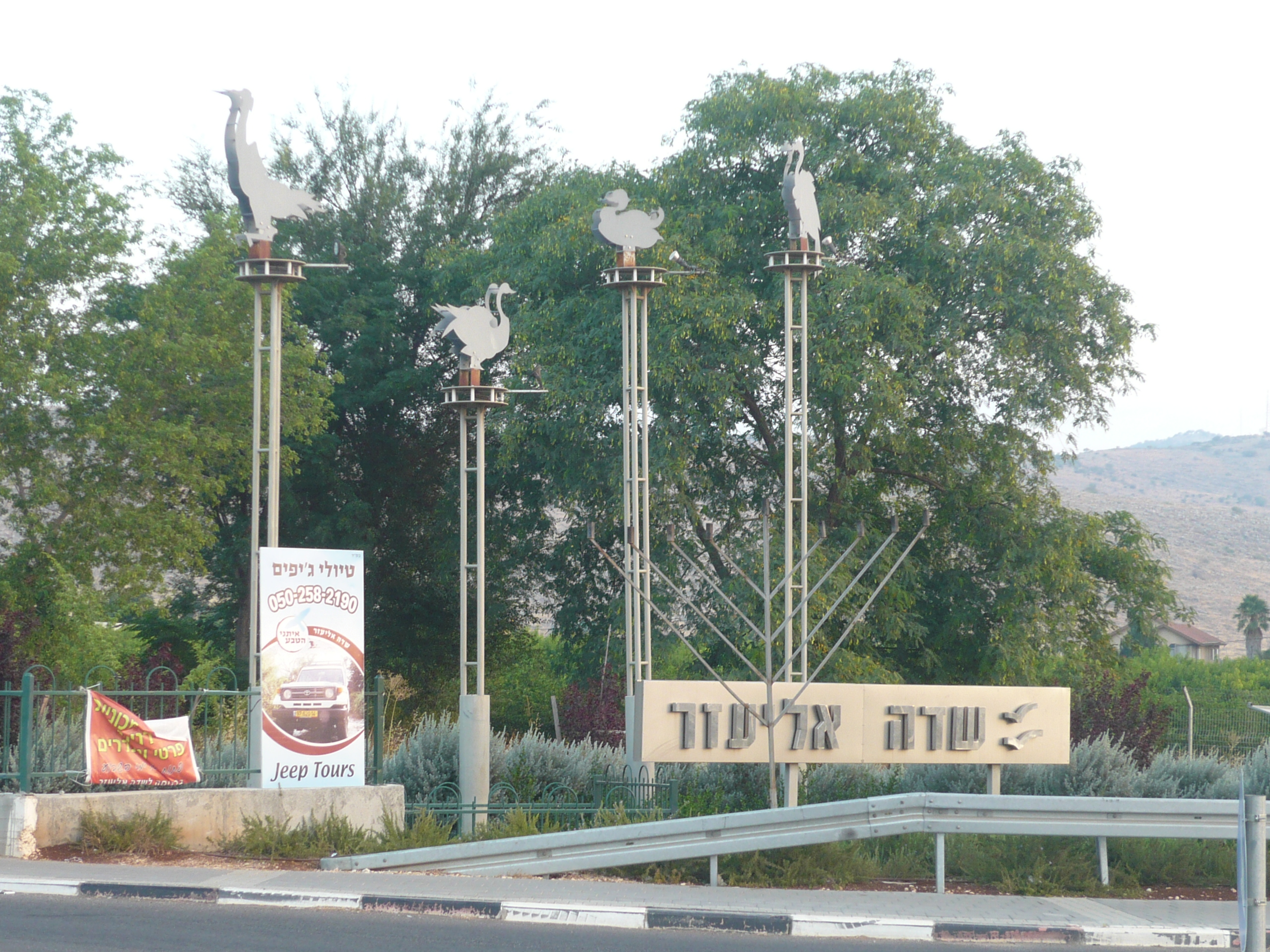
Sde Eliezer

Sde Eliezer (Hebrew: שְׂדֵה אֱלִיעֶזֶר, lit. Eliezer's Field) is a moshav in northern Israel. Located in the Hula Valley, it falls under the jurisdiction of Mevo'ot HaHermon Regional Council. In 2024 it had a population of 1,005.

== History ==
Sde Eliezer was founded in 1950 by residents of Yesod HaMa'ala and Kiryat Shmona. Jewish immigrants from Czechoslovakia, Yugoslavia, Poland and Romania also settled there. The moshav was named for Robert (Eliezer) Rothschild, grandson of Edmond de Rothschild, founder of the Palestine Jewish Colonization Association (PICA).

According to some sources the village was built on land which had been bought by PICA, on the lands of the depopulated Palestinian village of al-Husayniyya.

== Notable residents ==
- Eliezer Marom
