= Upper Galilee Regional Council =

Coordinates: 33°13′12″N 35°37′21″E

Upper Galilee גליל עליון
- Regional council (from 1950)
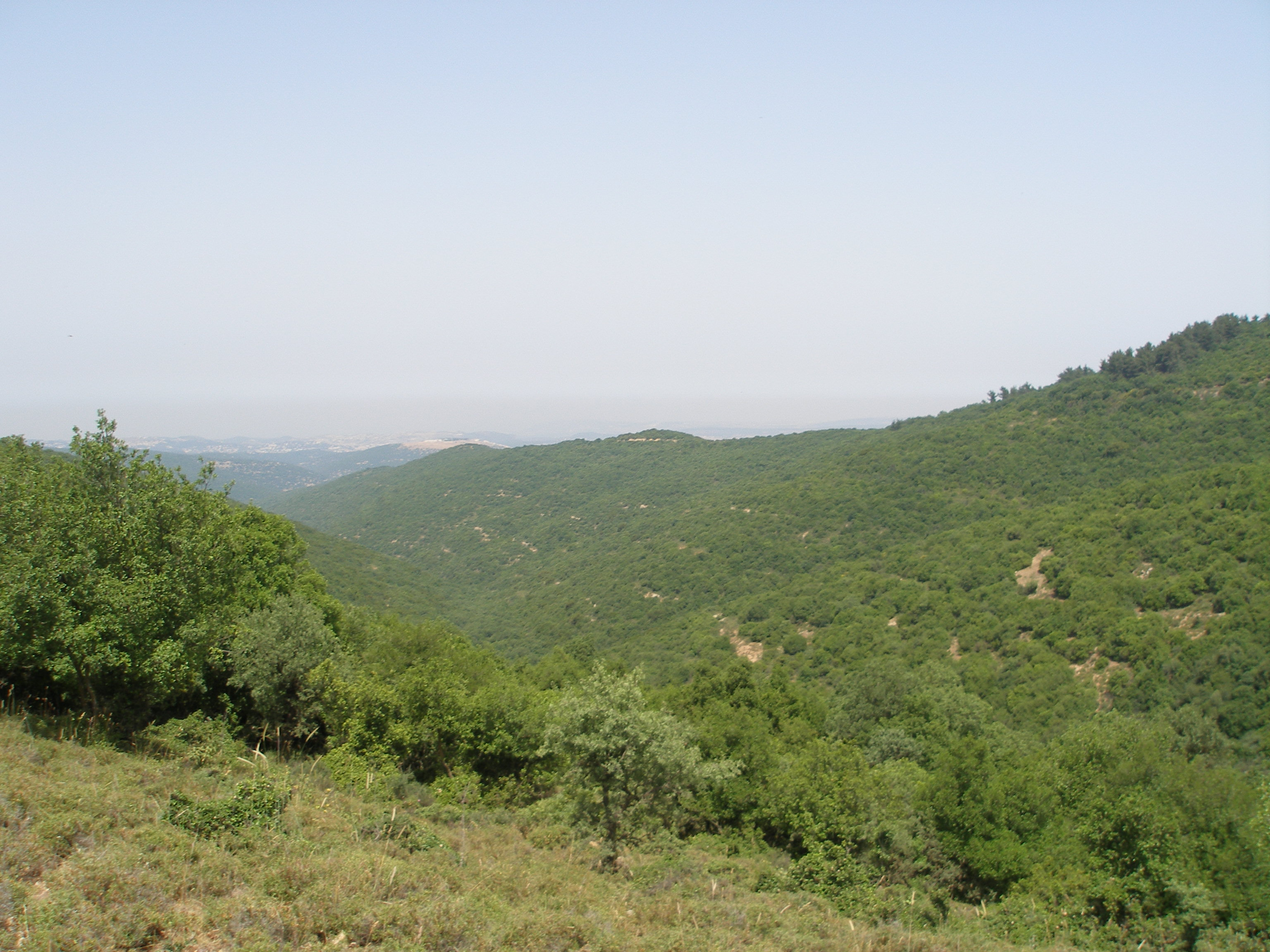
- Interactive map of Upper Galilee
- Country: Israel
- District: Northern
- Subdistrict: Safed, Acre
- Natural region: Elon, Central Lower Galilee, Eastern Upper Galilee, Hazor, Hula Valley

Government
  - Head of Municipality: Asaf Langleben

Area
  - Total: 296,560 dunams (296.56 km^{2}; 114.50 sq mi)

Population (2026)
  - Total: 19,238
  - Density: 64.871/km^{2} (168.01/sq mi)
- Website: www.galil-elion.org.il

The Upper Galilee Regional Council (Hebrew: מוֹעָצָה אֲזוֹרִית הַגָּלִיל הַעֶלְיוֹן, translit. Mo'atza Azorit HaGalil HaElyon) is a regional council in Israel's Upper Galilee region, bordered by the Mevo'ot HaHermon Regional Council and the Golan Regional Council, as well as a border with southern Lebanon.

As of February 2026, the municipal area has a population of 19,238 and is headed by Asaf Langleben. Its headquarters are located in Kiryat Shmona, an independent city not included in the council's jurisdiction.

== Communities ==
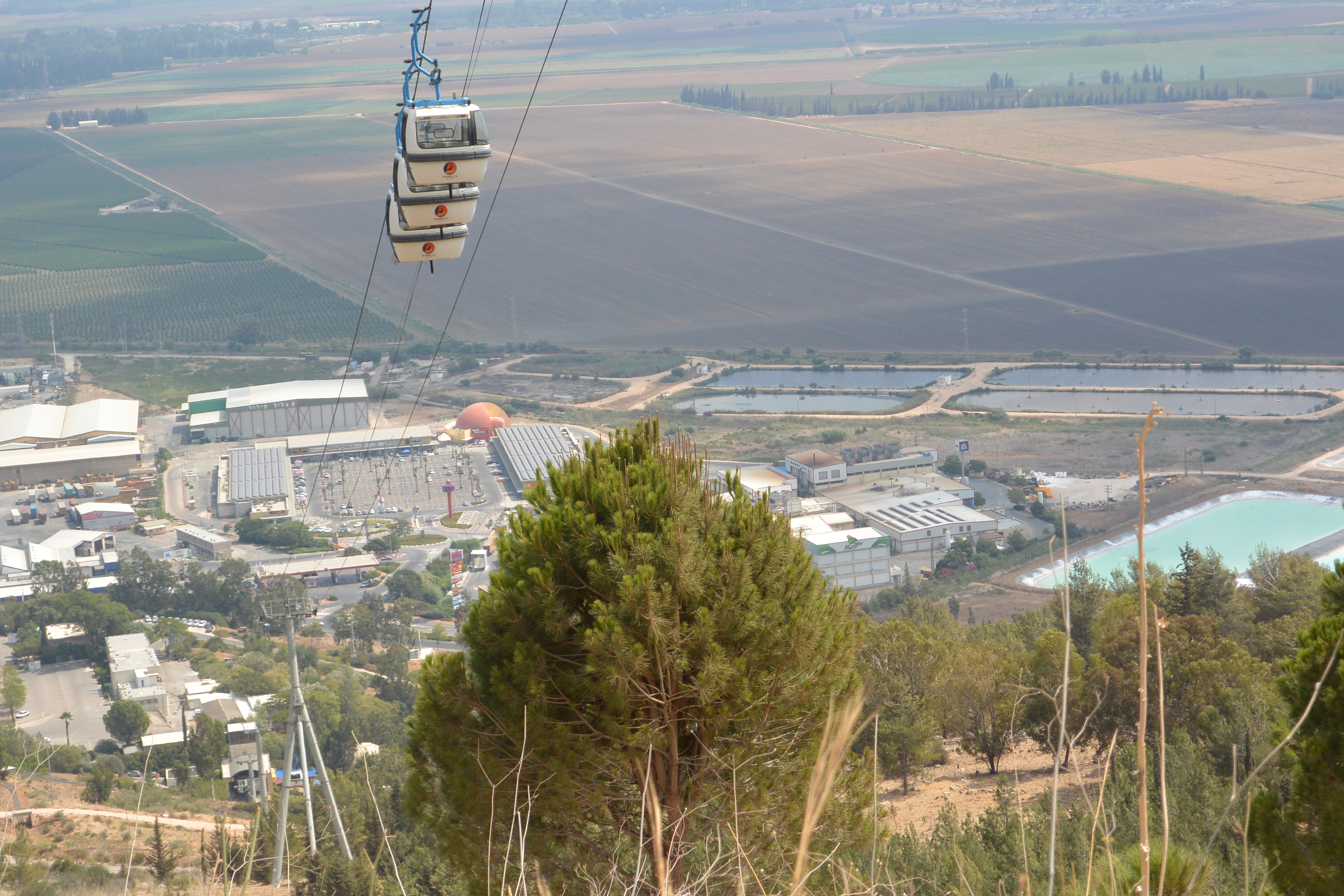
Manara Cable car- Cableway from Kiryat Shmona to Kibbutz Manara at the Naftali Mountains

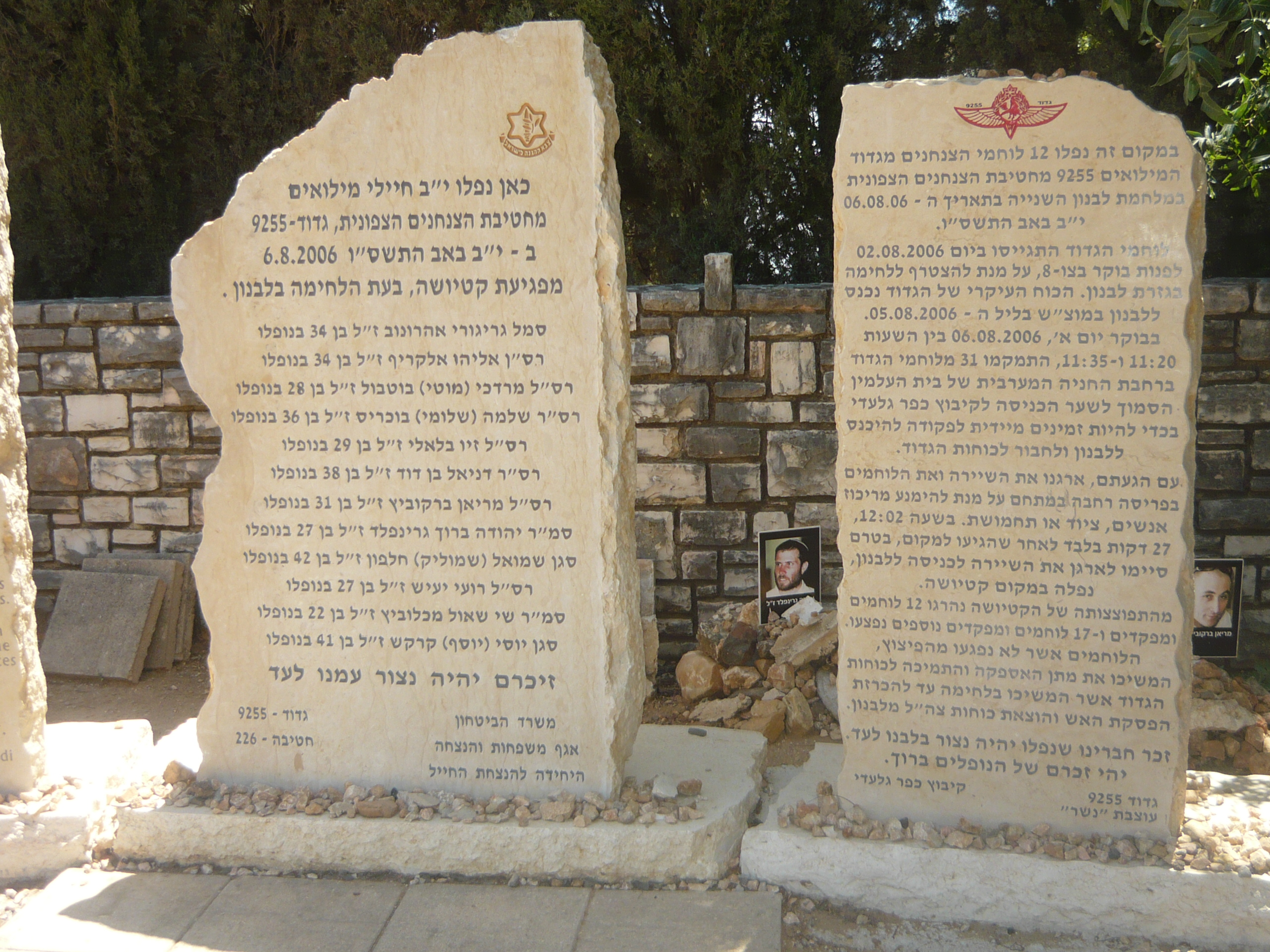
Monument commemorating the 12 soldiers who were killed in Kfar Giladi in the second Lebanon war, 2006

The council consists of 29 kibbutzim:

	Name	Established
1	Ami'ad	1946
2	Amir	1939
3	Ayelet HaShahar	1915
4	Bar'am	1949
5	Dan	1939
6	Dafna	1939
7	Gadot	1949
8	Gonen	1951
9	HaGoshrim	1948
10	Hulata	1937
11	Kadarim	1980
12	Kfar Blum	1943
13	Kfar Giladi	1916
14	Kfar HaNassi	1948
15	Kfar Szold	1942
16	Lehavot HaBashan	1947
17	Mahanayim	1939
18	Malkia	1949
19	Manara	1943
20	Ma'ayan Barukh	1947
21	Misgav Am	1945
22	Neot Mordechai	1946
23	Sasa	1949
24	Sde Nehemia	1940
25	Shamir	1944
26	Snir	1967
27	Tzivon	1980
28	Yiftah	1948
29	Yir'on	1949

== Demographics ==
As of February 2026, the region is home to 19,238 individuals. Nearly 30% of the population is under the age of 18, while slightly over 15% are senior citizens. Economically, the average salary for salaried employees in the region is slightly higher than the national average, while for the self-employed, it is slightly below the national average.

Historical population
Year	Pop.	±%
1972	6,300	—
1983	8,300	+31.7%
1995	7,500	−9.6%
2008	14,620	+94.9%
2022	19,672	+34.6%
2024	20,675	+5.1%

== Voting Patterns ==
In the 2022 election, 87 percent of voters in the regional council voted for the parties of the center-left coalition led by Yair Lapid, while 12 percent voted for the parties of the right-wing coalition led by Benjamin Netanyahu and 1 percent voted for the Arab parties.

In the 2026 election, 83 percent of voters in the regional council voted for the parties of the center-left coalition led by Gadi Eisenkot, while 11 percent voted for the parties of the right-wing coalition led by Benjamin Netanyahu and 0.4 percent voted for the Arab parties. An additional 3.3 percent voted for the Reservists, and 1.4 percent voted for Amcha Yisrael. Voter turnout increased 16 percent from the 2022 election.

== International partnerships ==
Since 1983, there is a partnership between the region of Upper Galilee and the German district of Ludwigsburg. It is the oldest partnership of the district. In 1997, the partnership was officiated. Joint projects between the two communities have to do with nature conservation, art, music, education and health. Student exchanges and teacher seminars also take place, as well as official delegation visits.
