= Mishmar HaYarden (moshava) =

Coordinates: 33°0′10″N 35°35′59″E

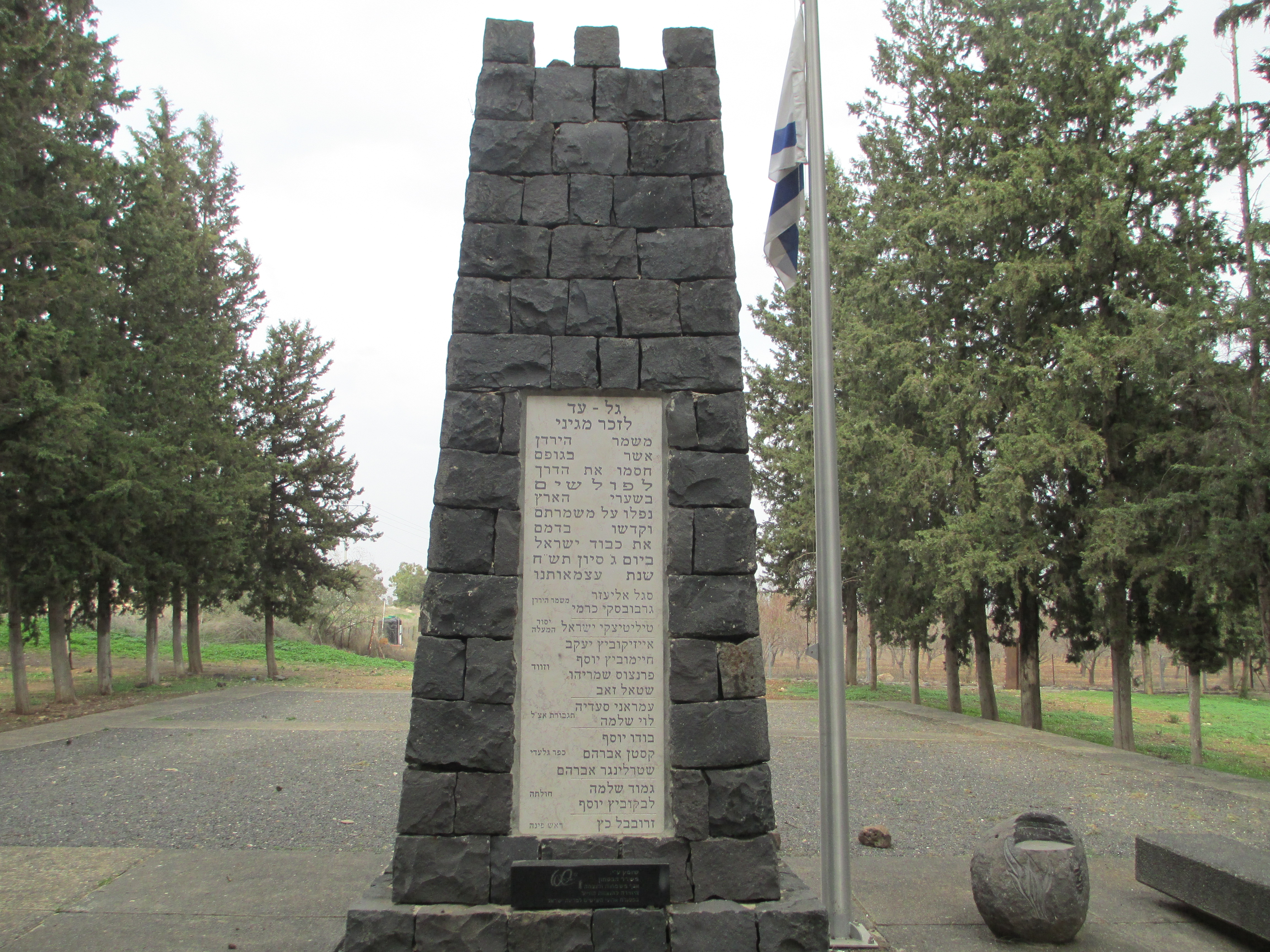
Mishmar HaYarden memorial

Mishmar HaYarden was a moshava (Jewish settlement) that was established in the Upper Galilee in northern Israel during the First Aliyah. It was destroyed during the 1948 Arab–Israeli war in 1948. Its Hebrew name meant Guardian of the Jordan. The village was re-established as new Mishmar HaYarden.

== History ==
The moshava was located on the road connecting Safed with Damascus (today Highway 91) west of the Bnot Ya'akov Bridge. It was first founded in 1884 as a private farm named "Shoshanat HaYarden" (Rose of the Jordan) by Mordecai Isaac Lubowsky. After he realized that he could not maintain the isolated farm, he sold a portion to Jews who settled the land with financial support from Hovevei Zion. They established the moshava "Mishmar HaYarden" in September 1890. In 1898 the moshava expanded to include the moshava of Hevrat Yaka, which added land and inhabitants. Most inhabitants supported the revisionist views of Zev Jabotinsky.

According to a census conducted in 1922 by the British Mandate authorities, Mishmar HaYarden had a population of 90 Jews.

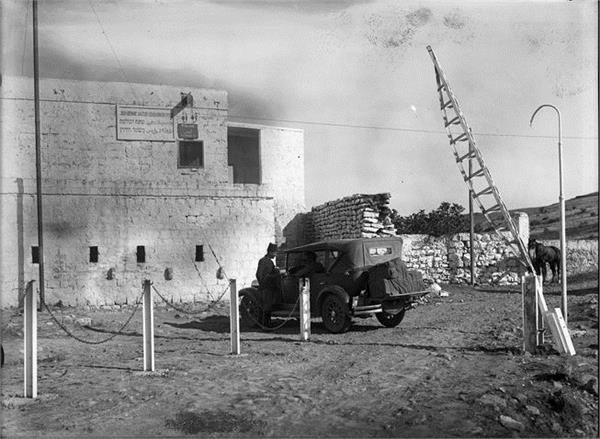
Mishmar HaYarden 1934

During the 1947–1949 Palestine war, on 6 June 1948, the Syrian army captained by Taufiq Bashour attacked the settlement, but the attack was repulsed. On 10 June, the settlement was attacked again, and the moshava was captured and destroyed after house-to-house fighting; fourteen residents and defenders of the moshava were killed. 39 survivors fell captive to the Syrians and remained as prisoners of war for thirteen months. At the end of the war, on 20 July 1949, the area returned to control of Israel as part of the cease-fire to end the war, but the moshava was not rebuilt. Kibbutz Gadot was later built on its land and the workers' moshav Mishmar HaYarden was established.

The story of the fall of Mishmar HaYarden is disputed between Irgun and the Haganah. Irgun and descendants of community residents claim that the arrival of the 23rd unit from the Karmeli Brigade, which was intended to strengthen the defense of the settlement, was stopped by the Oded Brigade of the IDF which was responsible for the region because the moshava identified with the revisionist movement. It is also alleged that Haganah forces stopped the Irgun soldiers in Rosh Pinna and stopped them from arriving to help the moshava. On the other side, people from the Oded Brigade claim that the Karmeli Brigade failed to reach the moshava in time because it crossed from the western Galilee front and did not manage to reorganize in its new location.

Some of the destroyed houses in the moshava are visible today. They form part of a memorial on the location.
