= Elifelet =

Elifelet: אֱלִיפֶלֶט (Hebrew)
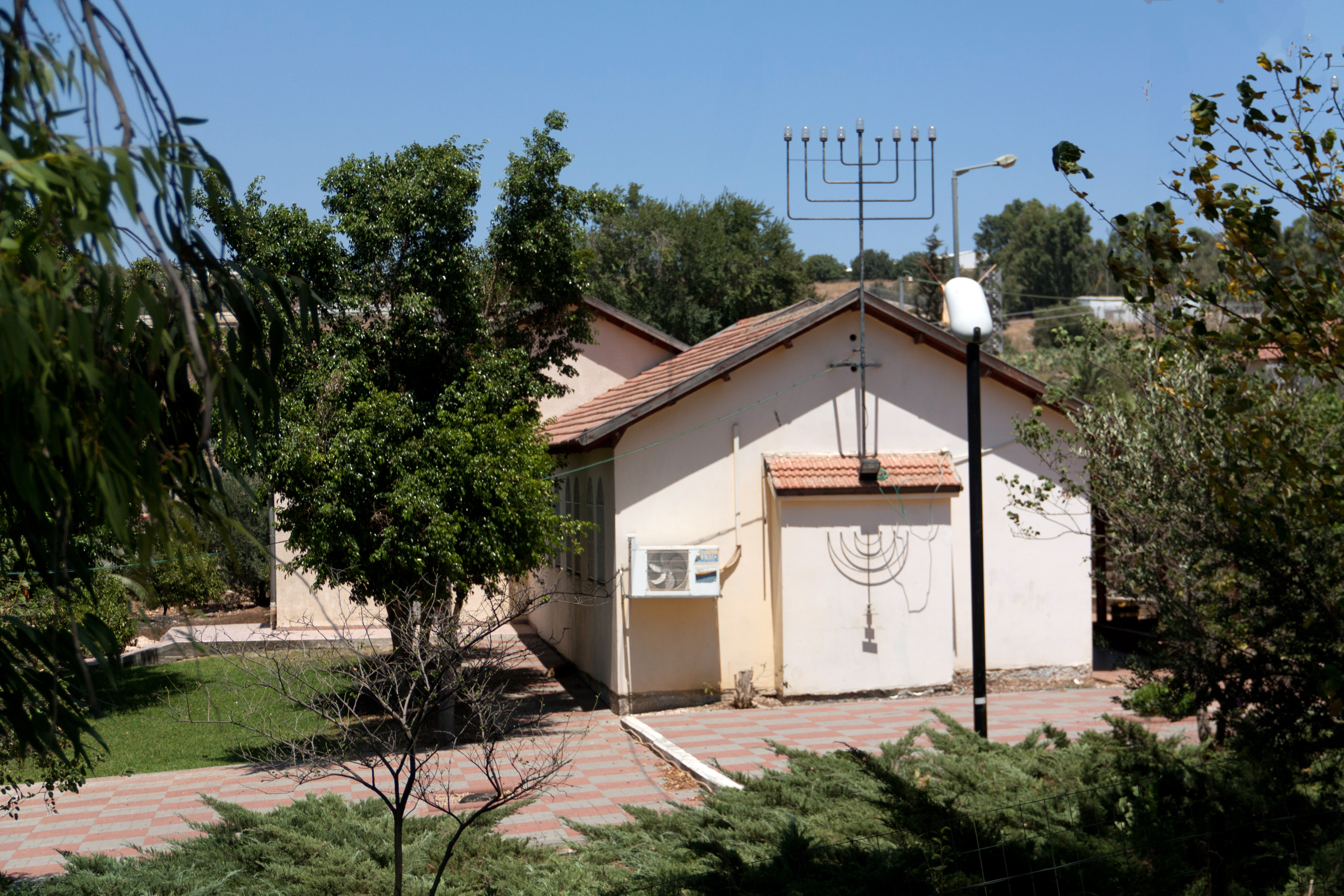
- Etymology: Named after Biblical character
- Location within Northeast Israel
- Coordinates: 32°56′51″N 35°32′56″E
- Country: Israel
- District: Northern
- Subdistrict: Safed
- Council: Mevo'ot HaHermon
- Affiliation: Moshavim Movement
- Founded: 1949
- Founder: Yemenite Jews
- Population (2024): 809

Elifelet (Hebrew: אֱלִיפֶלֶט) is a moshav in northern Israel. Located on the Korazim Plateau near Rosh Pina, it falls under the jurisdiction of Mevo'ot HaHermon Regional Council. In 2024 it had a population of 809.

== Etymology ==
The name "Elifelet" belongs to several characters in the Hebrew Bible, for example one of the sons of King David (2 Samuel 5:16, 1 Chronicles 3:8) and a repatriate after the Babylonian Captivity (Ezra 8:13).

== History ==
The moshav was founded in 1949 by immigrants from Yemen belonging to the Moshavim Movement, on the lands of the depopulated Palestinian village of al-Zanghariyya. Although it was abandoned after several years, it was resettled during the 1950s by immigrants from North Africa and Iraq.

The moshav is known for producing edible grasshoppers for culinary use.
