= Hatzor HaGlilit =

Hatzor HaGlilit חצור הגלילית
- Local council

Hebrew transcription(s)
  - ISO 259: Ḥaçor ha Glilit
  - Also spelled: Hatzor HaGlilit (unofficial)
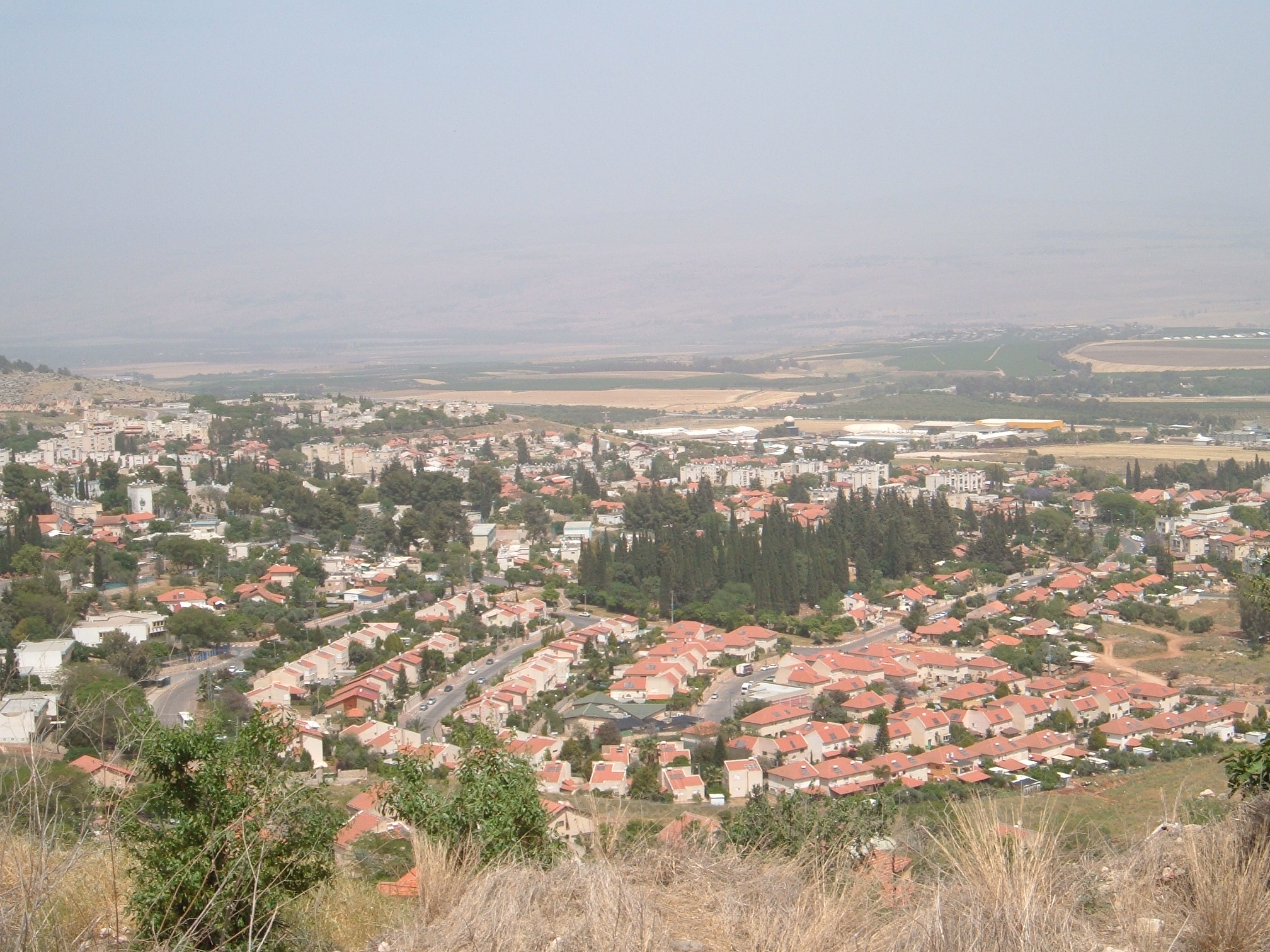
- View of Hatzor HaGlilit

- Location within Northeast Israel Location within Israel
- Coordinates: 32°58′46″N 35°32′37″E
- Country: Israel
- District: Northern
- Subdistrict: Safed
- Natural Region: Hazor
- Founded: 1953

Government
  - Head of Municipality: Michael Kabesa

Area
  - Total: 5,170 dunams (5.17 km^{2}; 2.00 sq mi)

Population (2024)
  - Total: 11,013
  - Density: 2,130/km^{2} (5,520/sq mi)
- Name meaning: Hatzor of Galilee
- Website: http://www.hatzorg.co.il

Hatzor HaGlilit (Hebrew: חצור הגלילית, lit. 'Hatzor of Galilee') is a town in the Korazim Plateau in the Upper Galilee in northern Israel near Rosh Pinna and Safed. It is named for the nearby biblical site of Tel Hazor. In 2024 it had a population of 11,013.

== History ==
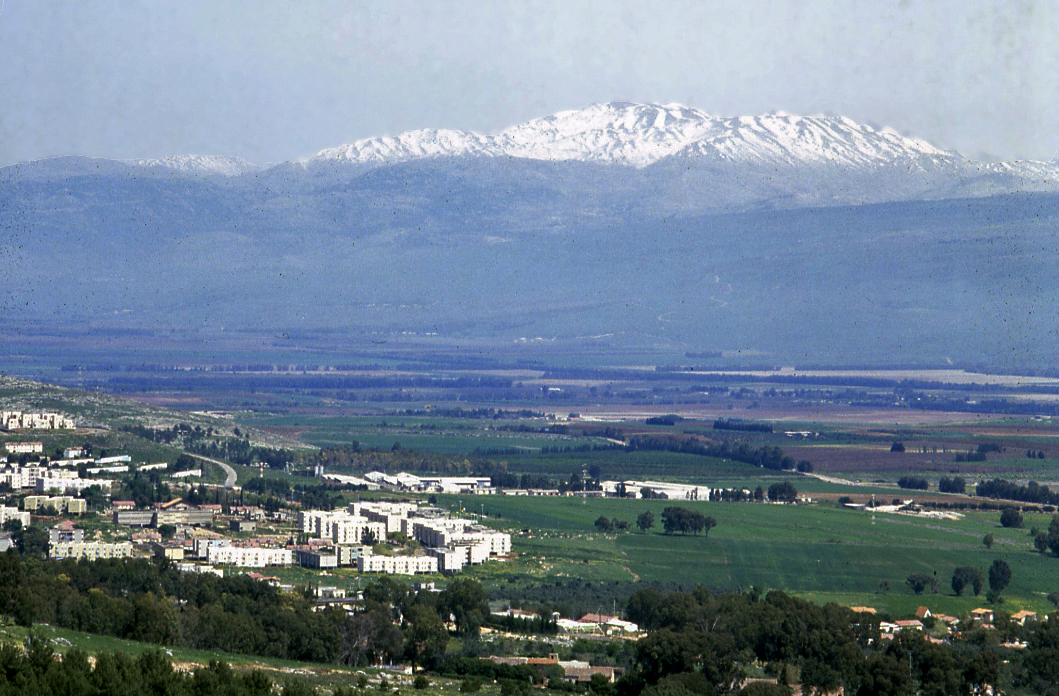
Hatzor HaGlilit overlooking Hula Valley and Mount Hermon

=== Ancient Hazor ===
Hatzor HaGlilit is named after the biblical city of Hazor, a Canaanite and later Israelite city belonging to the tribe of Naphtali (Joshua 19:36). In 732 BCE, it was conquered by Tiglath-Pileser III of the Neo-Assyrian Empire, and its population was deported, while the city was burnt to the ground.

Ancient Hazor was discovered in Tel Hazor, a tell located near kibbutz Ayelet HaShahar, a few kilometers north of Hatzor HaGlilit.

=== Modern Hatzor HaGlilit ===
Hatzor HaGlilit was founded in 1952–1953 as a transit camp. The new camp was located on the land of the depopulated Palestinian village of Mughr al-Khayt, 1 km southeast of the village site. The two adjacent transit camps were initially named "Hatzor A" and "Hatzor B", named for the nearby biblical site of Tel Hatzor, and housed immigrants and refugees, primarily Jews from North Africa.

In 1956, Hatzor HaGlilit was given the status of local council. By 1958, Hatzor HaGlilit had a population of 4,000 and received development town status. Over time, the city preserved its Jewish religious-traditional demographic status and later a Jewish ultra-Orthodox neighbourhood was also established, housing Gur Hassids.

In December 2011, according to the Central Bureau of Statistics, Hazor was populated by 8,705 residents, with 0.0% population growth.

== Demographics ==
Historical population
Year	Pop.	±%
1972	5,300	—
1983	5,900	+11.3%
1995	8,100	+37.3%
2008	8,600	+6.2%
2022	10,638	+23.7%
2024	11,013	+3.5%

In 2022, 97.5% of the population was Jewish and 2.5% was counted as other.

== Landmarks ==
One of the town's most well-known landmarks is the tomb of Honi the Circle-Maker, adjoining the burial sites of two of his grandsons, Abba Hilkiyah and Hanan HaNihba. According to Jewish legend, Honi HaM'agel had the power to bring rain through his prayers. The presence of this shrine attracted a large Gerrer hassid population to the town.

== Voting Patterns ==
In the 2022 election, 88 percent of voters in Hatzor HaGlilit voted for the parties of the right-wing coalition led by Benjamin Netanyahu, while 10 percent voted for the parties of the center-left coalition led by Yair Lapid and 0.2 percent voted for the Arab parties.

In the 2026 election, 85 percent of voters in Hatzor HaGlilit voted for the parties of the right-wing coalition led by Benjamin Netanyahu, while 12 percent voted for the parties of the center-left coalition led by Gadi Eisenkot and 0.2 percent voted for the Arab parties. An additional 1.9 percent voted for the Reservists, and 1.2 percent voted for Amcha Yisrael. Voter turnout increased 8 percent from the 2022 election.

== Bibliography ==
- HaReuveni, Immanuel (1999). Lexicon of the Land of Israel (in Hebrew). Miskal - Yedioth Ahronoth Books and Chemed Books. ISBN 965-448-413-7.
- Khalidi, Walid (1992), All That Remains: The Palestinian Villages Occupied and Depopulated by Israel in 1948, Washington D.C.: Institute for Palestine Studies, ISBN 0-88728-224-5
- Vilnai, Ze'ev (1976). "Hatzor (5)". Ariel Encyclopedia (in Hebrew). Vol. 3. Tel Aviv, Israel: Am Oved.
