= Mevo'ot HaHermon Regional Council =

Regional council in northern Israel

Coordinates: 33°7′N 35°34′E

Mevo'ot HaHermon מבואות החרמון
- Regional council (from 1981)
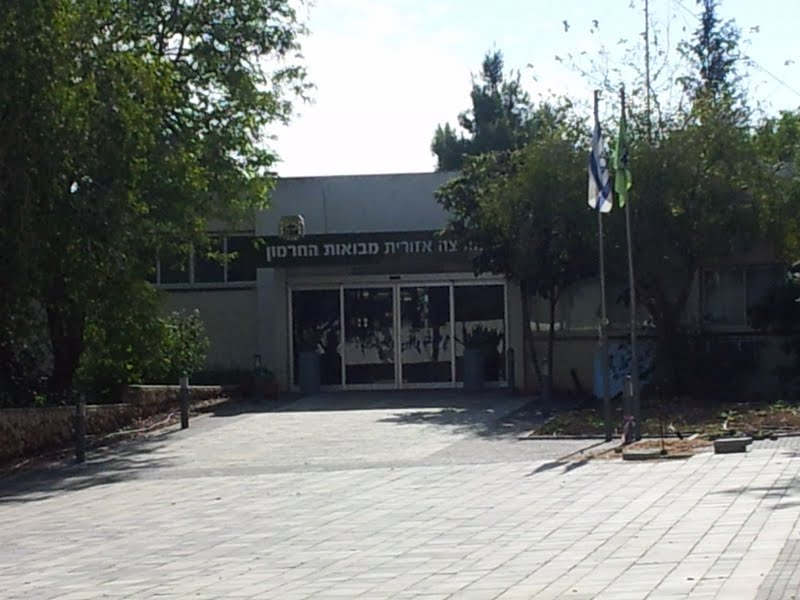
- Council building
- Interactive map of Mevo'ot HaHermon
- Country: Israel
- District: Northern
- Subdistrict: Safed
- Natural region: Eastern Upper Galilee, Hazor, Hula Valley

Government
  - Head of Municipality: Beni Ben Muvhar

Area
  - Total: 134,740 dunams (134.74 km^{2}; 52.02 sq mi)

Population (2024)
  - Total: 9,013
  - Density: 66.89/km^{2} (173.2/sq mi)
- Website: www.mvhr.org.il

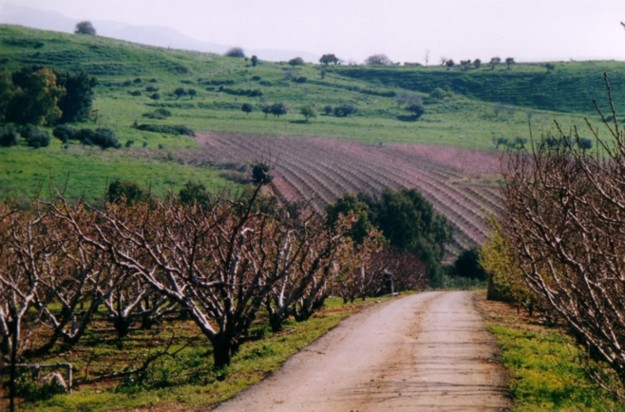
Yuval orchards

Mevo'ot HaHermon Regional Council (Hebrew: מועצה אזורית מבואות החרמון, Mo'atza Azorit Mevo'ot HaHermon) is a Regional Council in the Northern District of Israel. It encompasses 13 moshavim and community settlements, from the northern shore of the Sea of Galilee, to the Lebanese border and Mount Hermon. Its offices are located in Merkaz Kach, between roads 90 and 899.

== Settlements ==
=== Moshavim ===
- Amnun
- Beit Hillel
- Dishon
- Elifelet
- Kahal
- Margaliot
- Mishmar HaYarden
- Ramot Naftali
- Sde Eliezer
- She'ar Yashuv
- Yuval

=== Community settlements ===
- Karkom
- Korazim

== Albanian earthquake relief assistance ==
On 26 November 2019, an earthquake struck the Durrës region of Albania, killing 51 people, injuring 3,000 others, and damaging 11,000 buildings. Israel sent a rescue and service team from the regional council of Mevo'ot HaHermon and Home Front Command troops to Albania to search through the rubble for survivors and rescue them, assess whether buildings were structurally sound, and provide Albanians who had been evacuated from their homes with waterproof tents to shelter them.

== Demographics ==
Historical population
| Year | Pop. | ±% |
|---|---|---|
| 1972 | 2,600 | — |
| 1983 | 2,800 | +7.7% |
| 1995 | 4,600 | +64.3% |
| 2008 | 6,300 | +37.0% |
| 2022 | 8,021 | +27.3% |
| 2024 | 9,013 | +12.4% |

== Voting Patterns ==
In the 2022 election, 53 percent of voters in the regional council voted for the parties of the center-left coalition led by Yair Lapid, while 47 percent voted for the parties of the right-wing coalition led by Benjamin Netanyahu and 0.1 percent voted for the Arab parties.

In the 2026 election, 52 percent of voters in the regional council voted for the parties of the center-left coalition led by Gadi Eisenkot, while 40 percent voted for the parties of the right-wing coalition led by Benjamin Netanyahu and 0.3 percent voted for the Arab parties. An additional 4.3 percent voted for the Reservists, and 2.5 percent voted for Amcha Yisrael. Voter turnout increased 18 percent from the 2022 election.
