= Rosh Pinna =

Rosh Pinna ראש פינה
- Local council

Hebrew transcription(s)
  - ISO 259: Roˀš Pinna
  - Also spelled: Rosh Pina (official); Rosh Pinah (unofficial)
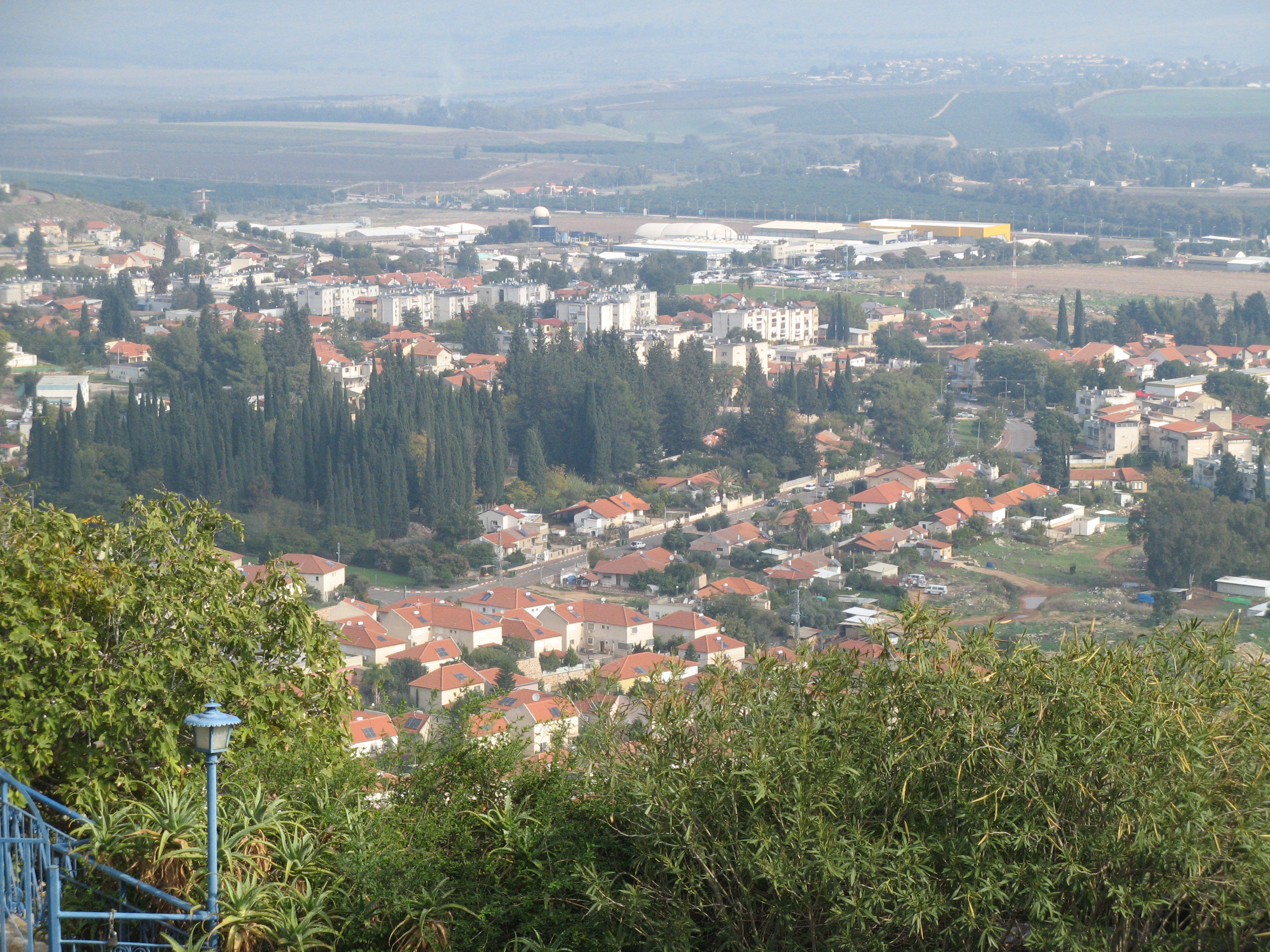
- View of Rosh Pinna

- Location within Northeast Israel Location within Israel
- Coordinates: 32°58′12″N 35°32′32″E
- Country: Israel
- District: Northern
- Subdistrict: Safed
- Natural Region: Hazor
- Founded: 1882; 144 years ago

Government
  - Head of Municipality: Moti Hatiel (by 2018 Israeli municipal elections)

Area
  - Total: 17,569 dunams (17.569 km^{2}; 6.783 sq mi)

Population (2024)
  - Total: 3,308
  - Density: 188.3/km^{2} (487.7/sq mi)
- Name meaning: Cornerstone

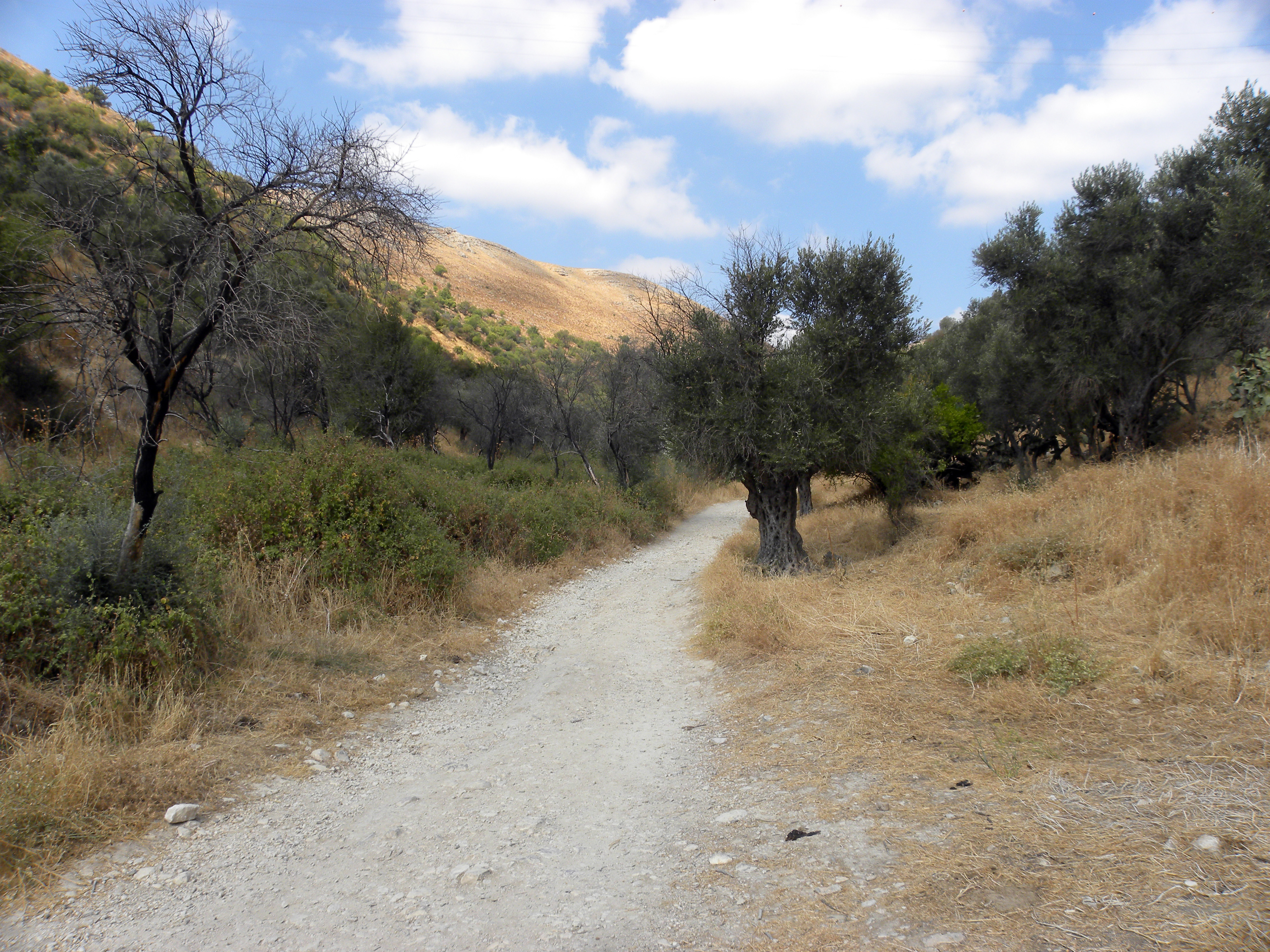
Old road from Rosh Pina to Safed, Upper Galilee, Israel.

Rosh Pinna (Hebrew: ראש פינה, lit. 'Cornerstone') or Rosh Pina, is a town in the Korazim Plateau in the Upper Galilee on the eastern slopes of Mount Kna'an in the Northern District of Israel. It was established as Gei Oni in 1878 by local Jews from Tzfat but was nearly abandoned, except for the families of Yosef Friedman, Aharon Keller, and possibly a few others. In 1882, thirty Jewish families who had emigrated from Romania reestablished the settlement as a moshava called Rosh Pina. The town is one of the oldest Zionist settlements in Israel. In 2024 it had a population of 3,308.

== Geography ==
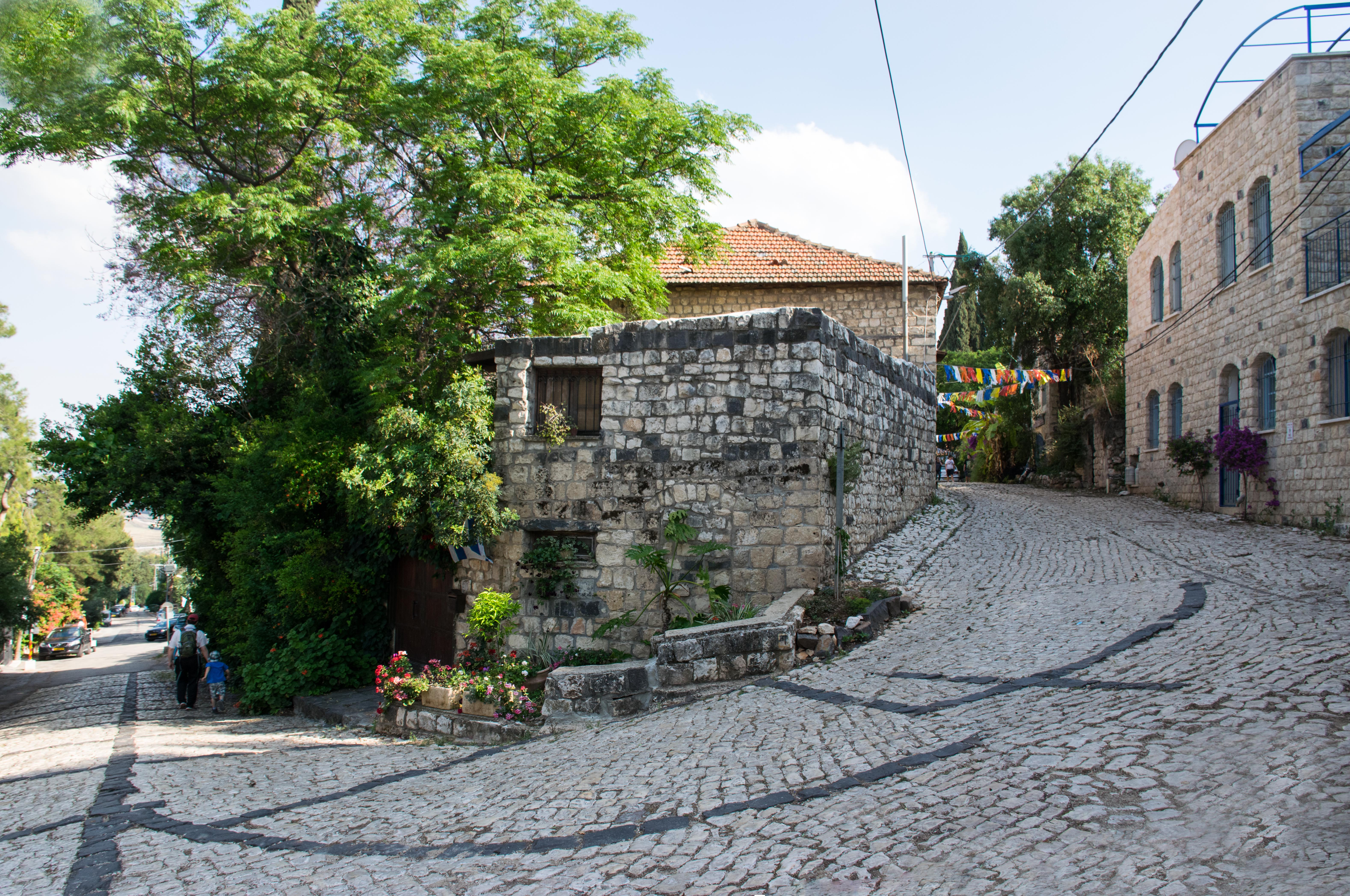
Older section of Rosh Pina

Rosh Pinna is located north of the Sea of Galilee, on the eastern slopes of Mount Kna'an, approximately 2 km (1 mi) east of the city of Safed, 420 m (1,378 ft) above sea level, latitude north 32° 58', longitude east 35° 31'. North of Rosh Pina is Lake Hula, which was a swamp area drained in the 1950s.

== History ==
In the spring of 1878, the Palestinian village of al-Ja'una sold half its lands, about 2,500 dunum, to Jews from Safed in order to fund the emigration of some of the villagers to the Hauran. Led by Elazar Rokah, the Jews moved into al-Ja'una, living among the Palestinians for fear of being unable to cope with Bedouin raids on their own. They called their settlement Gei Oni ("Valley of my Strength") as a Hebrew adaptation of the Arabic name. After one year of good harvests, a year of drought saw the Palestinians mortgage their lands to money lenders, but the Jews were unwilling to do the same and left. Gei Oni was established some 3 months before Petah Tikva, although for various historical reasons the latter is generally considered the first.

In 1882, the settlement was renewed as a moshava by immigrants from Romania, who named it Rosh Pinna ("cornerstone") after Psalm 118:22: "The stone which the builders rejected has become the cornerstone".

Rosh Pinna was one of the first modern Jewish agricultural settlements in the history of the Land of Israel, then part of the Ottoman Empire (Turkey). In 1883, it became the first Jewish settlement in the Land of Israel to come under the patronage of the Baron Edmond James de Rothschild. Rothschild's agent Joshua Ossovetski expanded the settlement with more land from Safed and Ja'una. Rosh Pinna had good relations with Ja'una, even establishing a modern Palestinian school there, but had some serious clashes with the Al-Zanghariyya Bedouin tribe.

Moshe David Shub (born 1854 in Moinești; died 1938 in Jerusalem) had been sent ahead to find and purchase an appropriate piece of land. Born as Moşe David Iancovici, in Palestine he became known as: שו"ב, Shub, a Hebrew abbreviation of the name of his profession, שוחט ובודק, read "shochet u-bodék", butcher and examiner [of kosher meat]; ("shuv" has also the Hebrew meaning of "once again", or "return!", an allusion to the main principle of Zionism; in Hebrew the same letter [ב] is used for "v" and "b").

Laurence Oliphant collected funds for Rosh Pina from Christadelphians and other sympathizers in Britain. He wrote about his visit to Rosh Pina in 1886:

"Jauna, which was the name of the village to which I was bound, was situated about three miles (5 km) from Safed, in a gorge, from which, as we descended it, a magnificent view was obtained over the Jordan valley, with the Lake of Tiberias lying three thousand feet below us on the right, and the waters of Merom, or the Lake of Huleh, on the left. The intervening plain was only waiting for development. The new colony has been established about eight months, the land having been purchased from the Moslem villagers, of whom twenty families remained, who lived on terms of perfect amity with the Jews. These consisted of twenty-three Roumanian and four Russian families, numbering in all one hundred and forty souls. The greater number were hard at work on their potato-patches when I arrived, and I was pleased to find evidences of thrift and industry. A row of sixteen neat little houses had been built, and more were in process or erection. Altogether this is the most hopeful attempt at a colony which I have seen in Palestine. The colonists own about a thousand acres of excellent land, which they were able to purchase at from three to four dollars an acre. The Russians are establishing themselves about half a mile from the Roumanians, as Jews of different nationalities easily get on well together. They call the colony Rosch Pina, or "Head of the Corner," the word occurring in the verse, "The stone which the builders rejected, the same is become the head of the comer."

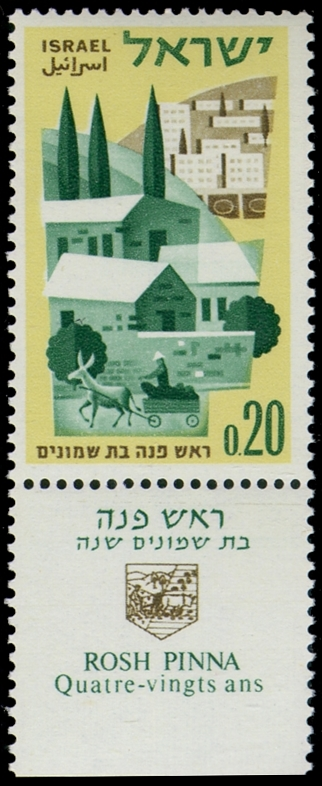
Israeli postal stamp, 1962

According to a census conducted in 1922 by the British Mandate authorities, Rosh Pinna had a population of 468 inhabitants, consisting of 460 Jews, 4 Muslims and 4 Christians.

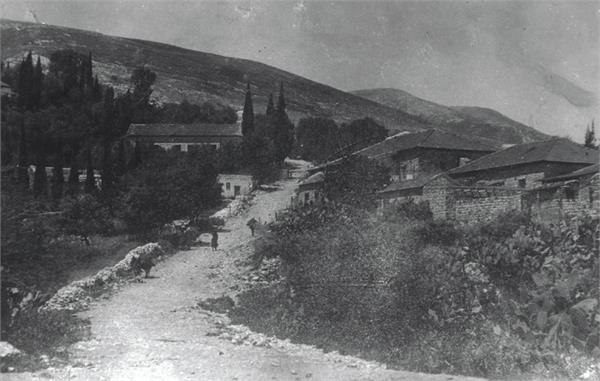
Rosh Pinna 1926

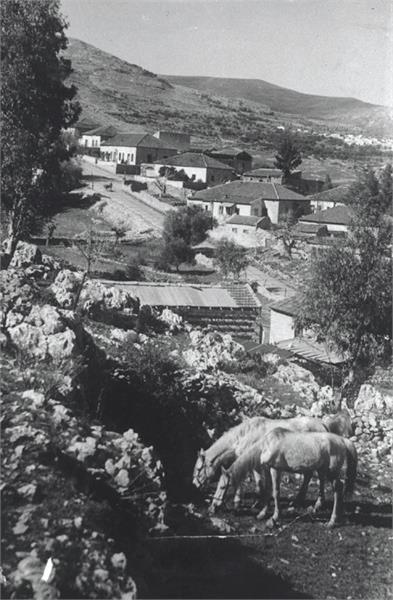
Rosh Pinna 1937

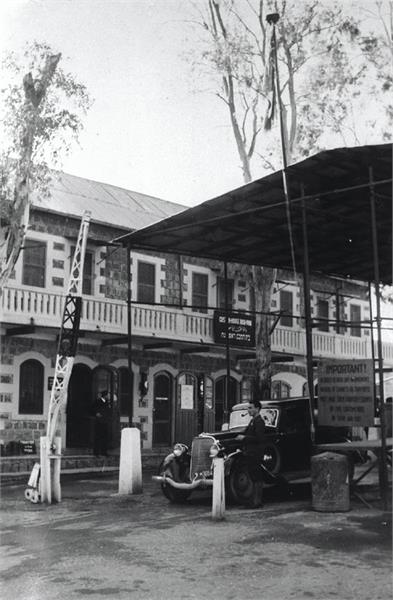
Customs House, Rosh Pinna. January 1939

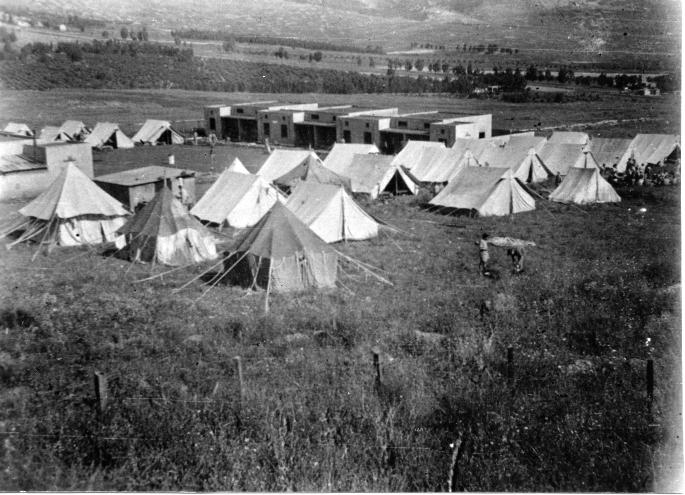
Yiftach Brigade Camp Philo, Rosh Pinna, 1948

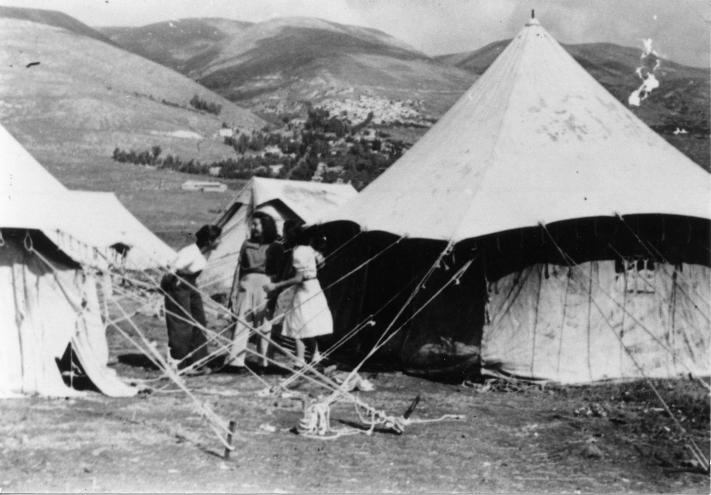
Camp Philo, Rosh Pinna. 1948

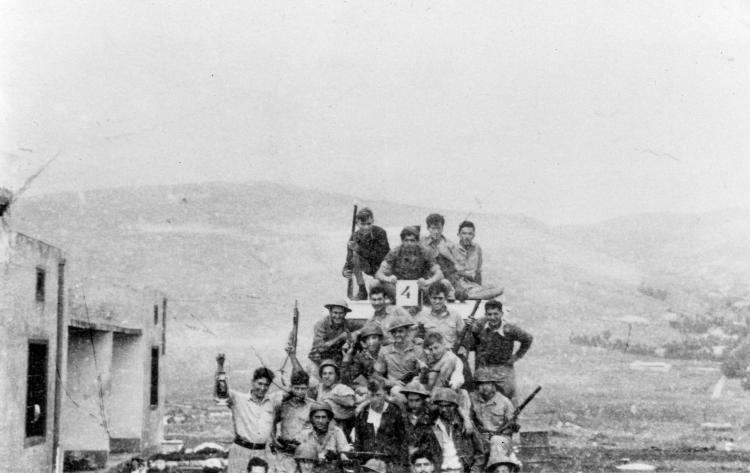
Members of the Yiftach Brigade arriving at Camp Philo, Rosh Pinna. 1948

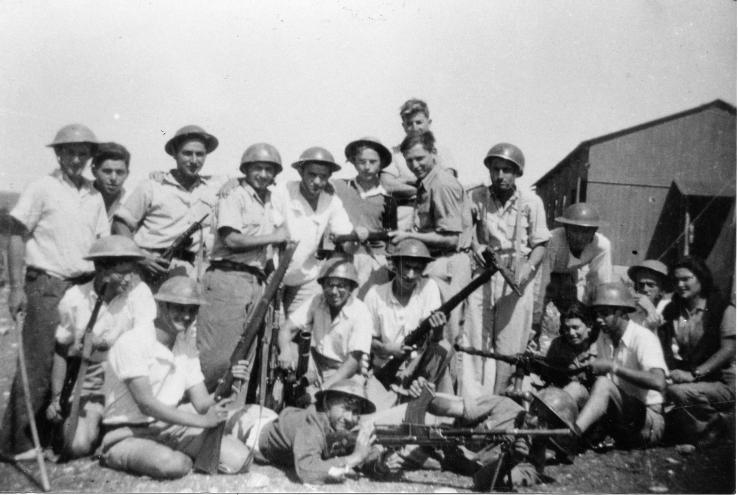
Philo Camp "D" Company 1st Battalion Yiftach Brigade prior to fighting around al-Malikiyya, 1948

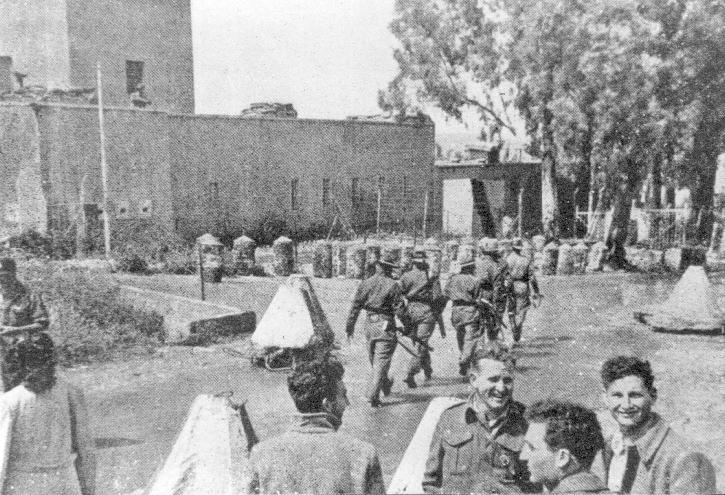
Yiftach Brigade take over Rosh Pinna police station during Operation Yiftach, 1948

== Discovery of wild emmer ==
Botanist Aaron Aaronsohn, while trekking around Rosh Pina during his 1906 field trip, discovered wild-growing emmer (Triticum dicoccoides), whom he considered to be the "mother of wheat", an important find for agronomists and historians of human civilization. Geneticists have proven that wild emmer is indeed the ancestor of most domesticated wheat strands cultivated on a large scale today with the exception of durum wheat; einkorn, a different ancient species, is currently just a relict crop.

== Demographics ==
Historical population
Year	Pop.	±%
1972	900	—
1983	1,200	+33.3%
1995	1,900	+58.3%
2008	2,600	+36.8%
2022	3,352	+28.9%
2024	3,308	−1.3%

In 2022, 97.4% of the population was Jewish and 2.6% was counted as other.

== Education ==
Rosh Pina had the first Hebrew-language school in the Galilee, in 1899. The principal Yishaq Epstein also enrolled four Palestinian children in the school.

== Transportation ==
Ben Ya'akov Airport (Mahanaim Airport) is located 2.1 km (1 mi) away from Rosh Pina.

== Medical facilities ==
The Mifne Center, which means turning point, a program for the treatment of autism spectrum disorder, is situated in Rosh Pina.

== Landmarks ==
- Mitzpe HaYamim, a world-class spa, is located on a mountainside near Rosh Pina. Amenities include a range of health and cosmetic treatments, an art gallery where guests can view artists at work, art workshops and an organic garden.
- The House of Dignitaries is a structure built in 1882 and used as a center of administration and finance for Rosh Pina and other towns in the Galilee region. From this building, a loudspeaker was used to broadcast the local news.
- An old synagogue, built during the first decade and which was commissioned by the Baron.
- Professor Mer's residence - the home of Professor Gideon Mer, an expert on malaria, epidemiologist and an important contributor to the local eradication of malaria in the 1930s. The house presents a room dedicated to his memory and an exhibit of ancient items from various periods, such as old plows, laboratory equipment and textbooks.
- PICA House provides an audio-visual presentation that tells the story of Rosh Pina. PICA House served as an administrative center and residence for Baron Rothschild’s clerks, advisors, and agricultural counselors.
- The Baron Rothschild' gardens. The gardens were designed by a French landscape architect and planted in 1886. Many plants such as Bougainvillea and pine trees were brought from France.
- The grave of Honi HaM'agel, a Jewish scholar, is located on the outskirts of Hatzor HaGlilit, a few kilometers from Rosh Pina.
- "Nimrod Lookout", a green spot with water views as seen from the viewpoint flowing through, facing the landscapes of the Hula Valley, the Golan Heights and Mount Hermon, will be built in the Pioneers National Restoration Site in old Rosh Pina.

== Voting Patterns ==
In the 2026 election, 58 percent of voters in Rosh Pinna voted for the parties of the center-left coalition led by Gadi Eisenkot, while 35 percent voted for the parties of the right-wing coalition led by Benjamin Netanyahu and 2 percent voted for the Arab parties. An additional 3 percent voted for the Reservists, and 2.2 percent voted for Amcha Yisrael. Voter turnout increased 16 percent from the 2022 election.

== Notable residents ==
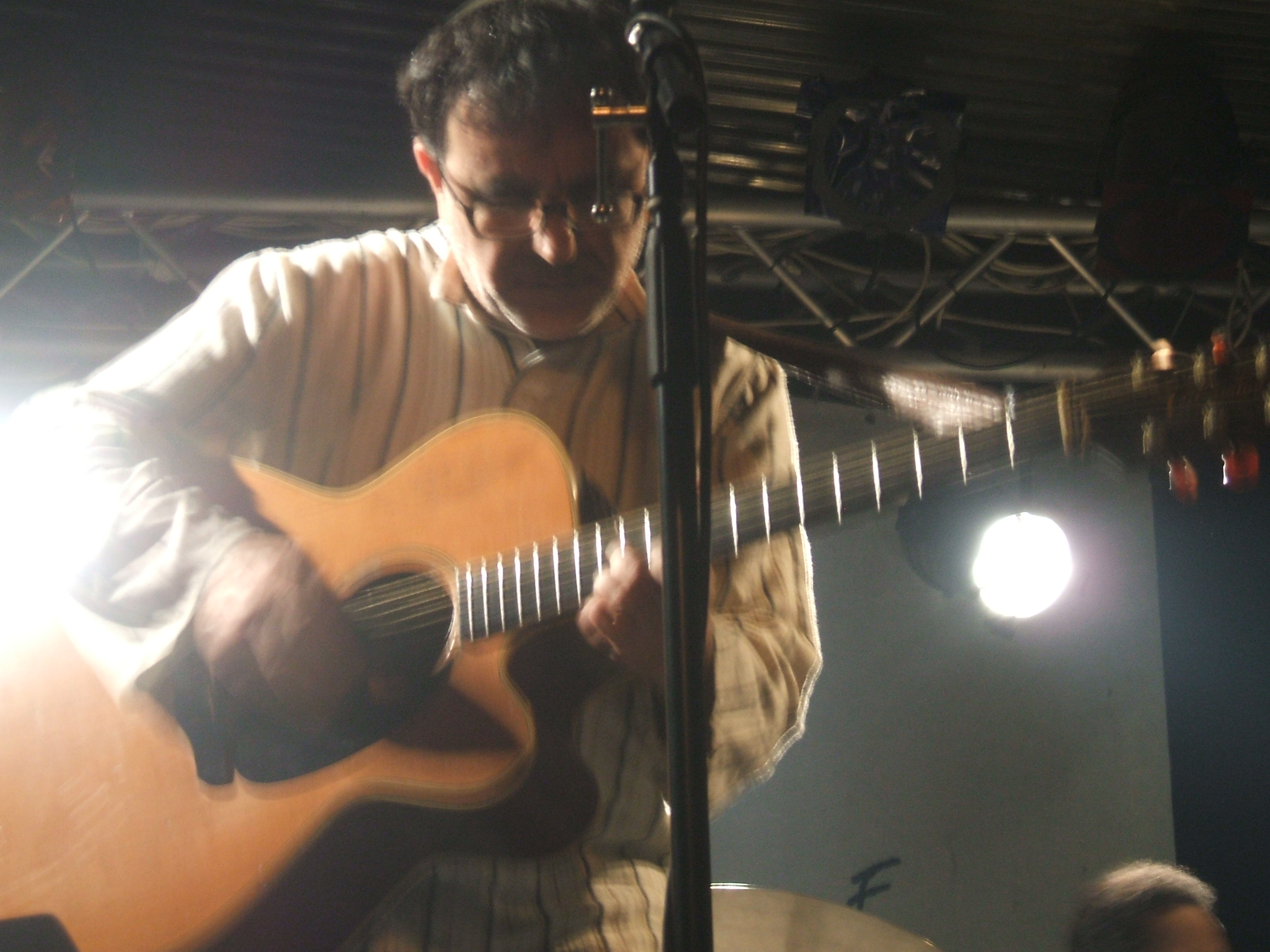
Ehud Banai

- Ami Assaf (1903–63), politician
- Ehud Banai (born 1953), singer and songwriter
- Meir Dagan (born 1945), former Director General of Mossad
- Arna Mer-Khamis (1929–95), political and human rights activist

== See also ==
- Tegart fort, of which one housed the British police station. Taken by Yiftach Brigade.
