= Safed Subdistrict =

Coordinates: 33°00′N 35°30′E

Safed district נפת צפת قضاء صفد
- Subdistrict
- Northern District in blue, with Safed Subdistrict in dark blue
- Interactive map of Safed district
- Country: Israel
- District: Northern

Area
  - Total: 670 km^{2} (260 sq mi)

Population (2024)
  - Total: 135,052

Ethnicity
  - Jews and others: 87.0%
  - Arabs: 10.9%

The Safed subdistrict is one of Israel's sub-districts in the Northern District. As the name suggests, the largest city in the subdistrict is Safed.

== History ==
The subdistrict is mostly composed of what had been, during British-ruled Mandatory Palestine, the Safad Subdistrict.

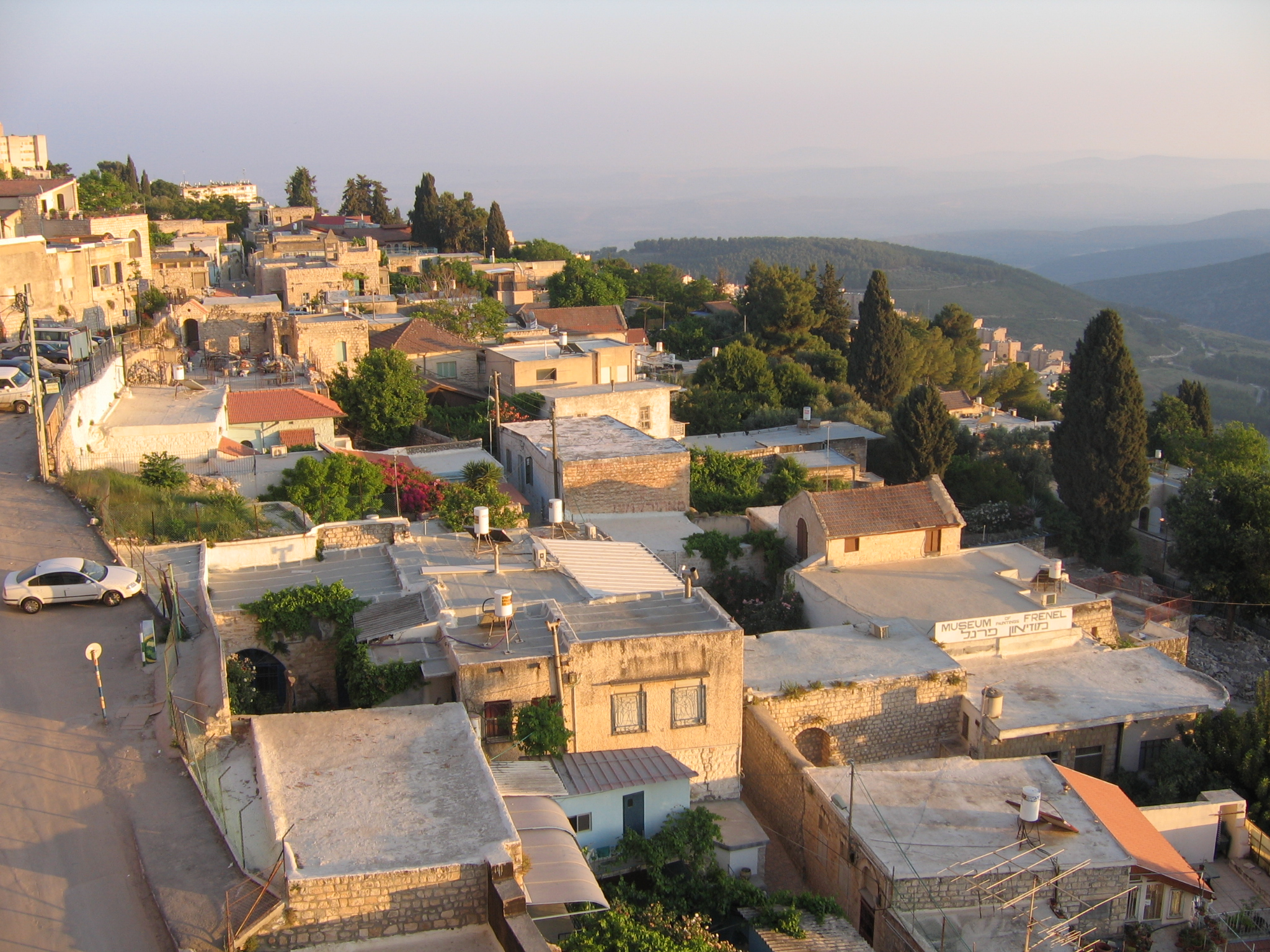
Safed - it is one of the holy cities of Judaism. In the image is the Artists Quarter of Safed

== Demographics ==
Historical population
Year	Pop.	±%
1972	51,800	—
1983	59,000	+13.9%
1995	75,100	+27.3%
2008	105,820	+40.9%
2022	129,340	+22.2%
2024	135,052	+4.4%

== Administrative local authorities ==
Cities	Local Councils	Regional Councils
Kiryat Shmona; Safed	Hazor HaGelilit; Jish (also: Gush Halav); Metula; Rosh Pinna; Tuba-Zangariyye; Yesod HaMa'ala	Merom HaGalil (part); Mevo'ot HaHermon; Upper Galilee (part)

== Voting Patterns ==
In the 2022 election, 61 percent of voters in the subdistrict voted for the parties of the right-wing coalition led by Benjamin Netanyahu, while 33 percent voted for the parties of the center-left coalition led by Yair Lapid, and 6 percent voted for the Arab parties.

In the 2026 election, 54 percent of voters in the subdistrict voted for the parties of the right-wing coalition led by Benjamin Netanyahu, while 33 percent voted for the parties of the center-left coalition led by Gadi Eisenkot and 9 percent voted for the Arab parties. An additional 2.3 percent voted for the Reservists, and 1.6 percent voted for Amcha Yisrael. Voter turnout increased 16 percent from the 2022 election.

== Natural Regions ==
Districts, Subdistricts and Natural Regions of the State of Israel, 2018

- 211 Hula Valley
  - Population (2024): 46,202
  - Largest city: Kiryat Shmona
- 212 Eastern Upper Galilee
  - Population (2024): 59,264
  - Largest city: Safed
- 213 Hazor
  - Population (2024): 27,529
  - Largest city: Hatzor HaGlilit
- 214 Central Lower Galilee
  - Population (2024): 2,057
  - Largest city: Tefahot
