= Northern District (Israel) =

District of Israel

Coordinates: 32°50′N 35°20′E

- District of Israel

transcription(s)
  - Arabic: منطقة الشمال; Minṭaqat ash-Shamāl
  - Hebrew: מָחוֹז הַצָּפוֹן; Mekhoz HaTzafon
- Interactive map of Northern District
- Cities: 18
- Local Councils: 60
- Regional Councils: 15
- Capital: Nof HaGalil
- Largest: Nazareth

Government
  - District Commissioner: Uri Ilan (acting)

Area
  - Total: 4,473 km^{2} (1,727 sq mi)

Population (2023)
  - Total: 1,527,800
  - Density: 341.6/km^{2} (884.6/sq mi)
- ISO 3166 code: IL-Z

The Northern District (Hebrew: מָחוֹז הַצָּפוֹן, romanized: Mekhoz HaTzafon; Arabic: منطقة الشمال, romanized: Minṭaqat ash-Shamāl) is one of Israel's six administrative districts. The Northern District has a land area of 4,473 km^{2}, making it the second largest district in Israel.

The Golan Heights has been run as a sub-district of the North District of Israel since the 1981 Golan Heights Law was passed, although the claim is only recognized by the United States and Colombia, while the United Nations Security Council condemned the annexation in its Resolution 497 without enforcing it. The Golan Heights covers a land area of 1,154 km^{2} and the remainder of the Northern District covers 3,324 km^{2} (3,484 km^{2} including water).

== Geography ==
=== Climate ===
The Northern District has a Mediterranean climate (Köppen: Csa), with hot, dry summers and cool, rainy occasionally snowy winters. It is home to the wettest locations in Israel, including Harashim.

== Demographics ==
Historical population
| Year | Pop. | ±% |
|---|---|---|
| 1972 | 432,500 | — |
| 1983 | 608,700 | +40.7% |
| 1995 | 890,200 | +46.2% |
| 2008 | 1,240,590 | +39.4% |
| 2022 | 1,517,527 | +22.3% |
| 2024 | 1,581,700 | +4.2% |

According to the Israeli Central Bureau of Statistics data for 2022:

- Total population: 1,527,800 (2022)
- Ethnic:
  - Arabs: 816,800 (53.5%)
  - Jews: 647,500 (42.4%)
  - Others: 63,500 (4.2%)

In the Israeli census, no distinction is made between Arab citizens of Israel and Syrian inhabitants of the Golan Heights, many of whom are not citizens of Israel, but of Syria.

- Religions:
  - Jews: 647,500 (42.4%)
  - Muslims: 597,300 (39.1%)
  - Druze: 120,300 (7.9%)
  - Christians: 97,800 (6.4%)
  - Not classified: 55,600 (3.6%)
- Density: 335/km^{2}

The Northern District is the only district of Israel where the majority of inhabitants are Arabs.

== Administrative local authorities ==
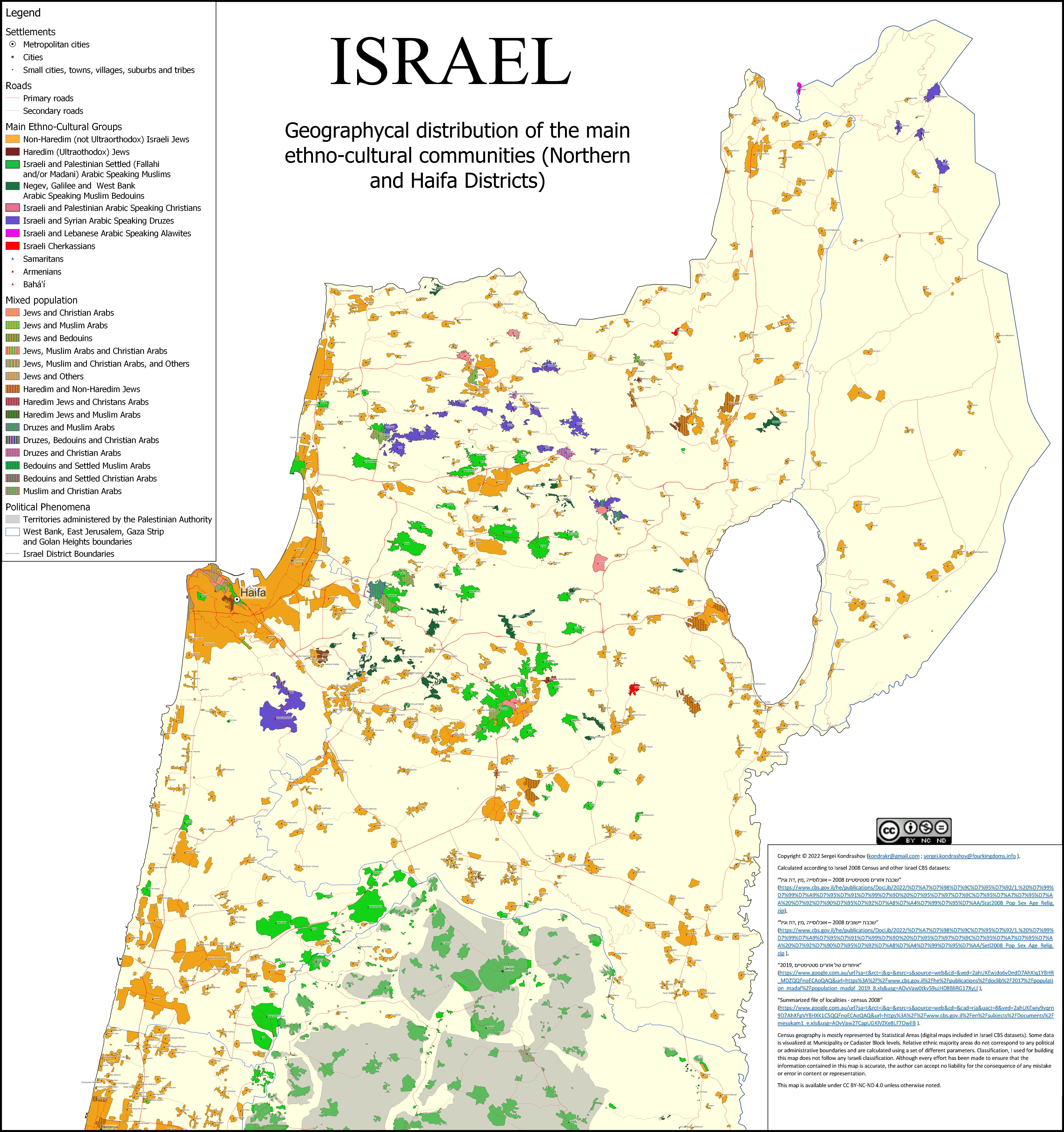
Geographical distribution of the main ethno-cultural communities Haifa and Northern districts

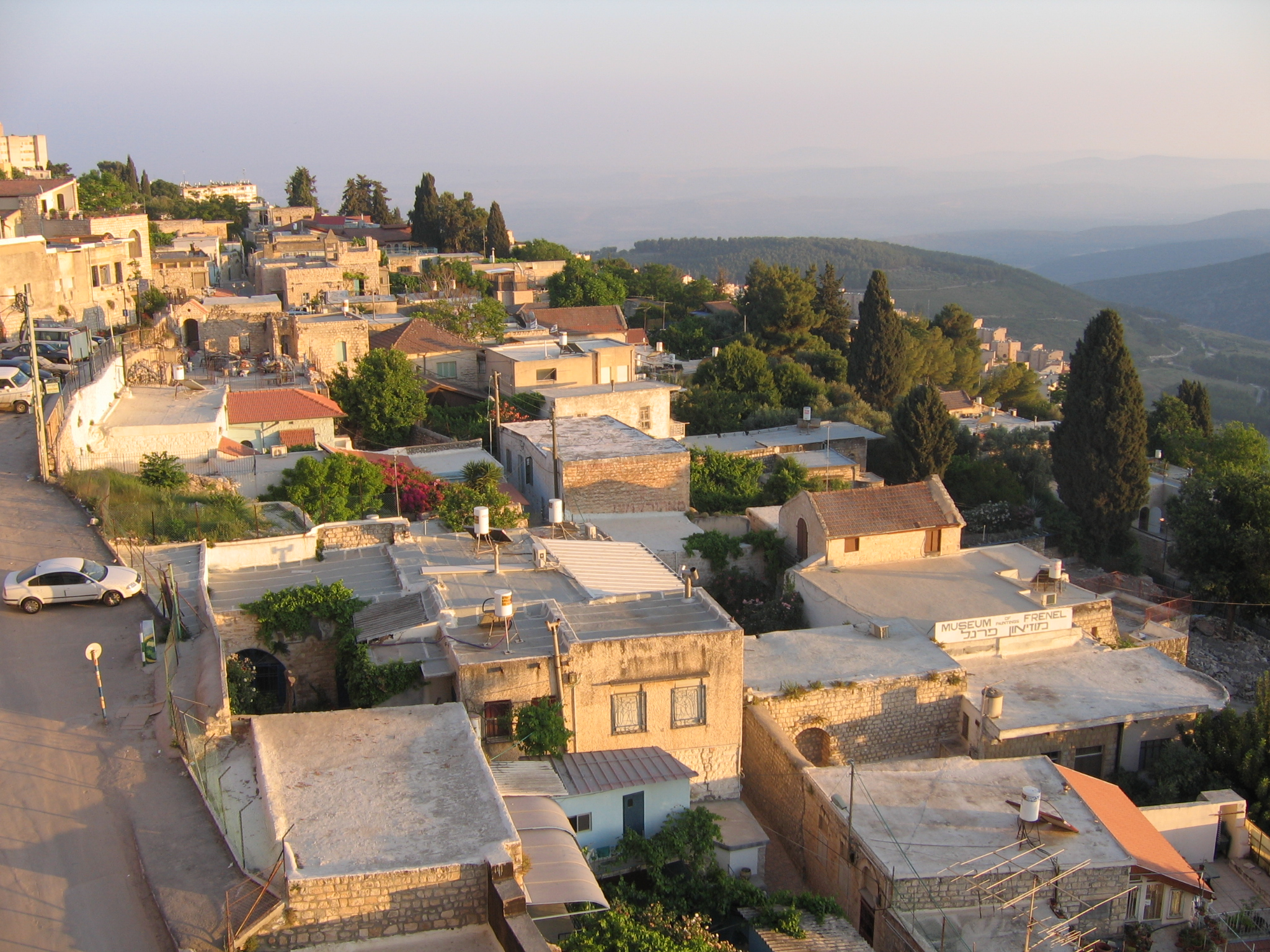
Safed, one of the 4 holy cities in Judaism. View of the artists' quarter of Safed

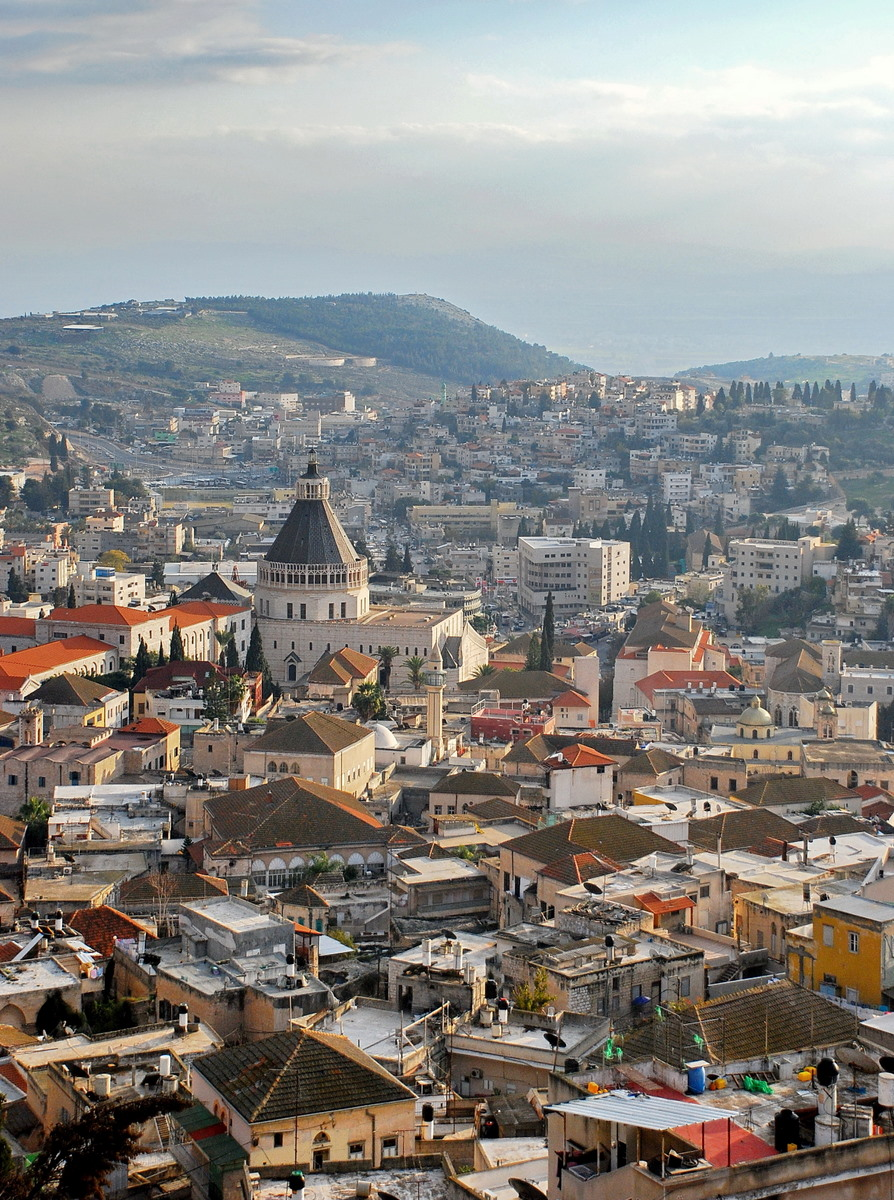
Nazareth, the largest city in the North District and hometown of Jesus.

Subdistricts and Natural Regions
Acre (Natural regions: Akko · Elon · Karmiel · Nahariyya · Shefar'am · Yehi'am); Golan (Natural regions: Hermon · Middle Golan · Northern Golan · Southern Golan); Jezreel (Natural regions: Beit She'an Valley · Harod Valley · Kokhav Plateau · Menashe Plateau · Nazareth-Tir'an Mountains · Yizre'el Valley · Yokneam); Kinneret (Natural regions: Eastern Lower Galilee · Kinerot); Safed (Natural regions: Central Lower Galilee · Eastern Upper Galilee · Hazor · Hula Valley)
| Cities | Local Councils | Regional Councils |
| Acre; Afula; Arraba; Bet She'an; Karmiel; Kiryat Shmona; Ma'alot-Tarshiha; Maghar; Migdal HaEmek; Nahariyya; Nazareth; Nof HaGalil; Safed; Sakhnin; Shefa-'Amr; Tamra; Tiberias; Yokneam | Abu Sinan; Basmat Tab'un; Beit Jann; Bi'ina; Bir al-Maksur; Bu'eine Nujeidat; Buq'ata; Daburiyya; Deir al-Asad; Deir Hanna; Eilabun; Ein Qiniyye; Ein Mahil; Fassuta; Ghajar; Hazor HaGelilit; Hurfeish; I'billin; Iksal; Ilut; Jadeidi-Makr; Jish (also: Gush Halav); Julis; Ka'abiyye-Tabbash-Hajajre; Kabul; Kafr Kanna; Kafr Manda; Kafr Yasif; Kaukab Abu al-Hija; Katzrin; Kfar Kama; Kfar Tavor; Kfar Vradim; Kisra-Sumei; Majd al-Krum; Majdal Shams; Mas'ada; Mashhad; Mazra'a; Metula; Migdal; Mi'ilya; Nahf; Peki'in; Ramat Yishai; Rameh; Reineh; Rosh Pinna; Sajur; Sha'ab; Shibli-Umm al-Ghanam; Shlomi; Tuba-Zangariyye; Tur'an; Yafa an-Naseriyye; Yanuh-Jat; Yavne'el; Yesod HaMa'ala; Yirka; Zarzir | al-Batuf; Bustan al-Marj; Emek HaYarden; Gilboa; Golan; Jezreel Valley; Lower Galilee; Ma'ale Yosef; Matte Asher; Megiddo; Merom HaGalil; Mevo'ot HaHermon; Misgav; Upper Galilee; Emek HaMaayanot (formerly Beit She'an Valley) |

== See also ==
- Galilee
- Arab localities in Israel
- List of cities in Israel
