= Maynier (surname) =

Maynier is a surname. Notable people with this surname include:

- David Maynier (b. 1968), South African politician
- Earle Maynier (d. 1972), Jamaican diplomat
- Ivy Lawrence Maynier (1921–1999), Canadian lawyer (wife of Earle Maynier)
- Jean Maynier (1495–1558), French public official

== See also ==
- Meynier
- Mayner
