= Dishon (disambiguation) =

Dishon (Hebrew: דִּישׁוֹן) is a settlement in northern Israel.

Dishon may also refer to:

- Dishon Stream (Nahal Dishon) a stream by the settlement
- Dishon (Hebrew: דִּישֹׁן, ḏîšōn), a Hebrew biblical name for pygarg, possibly an antelope species
- Dishon Cave ( מערת דישון), Northern District, Israel
- Mount Dishon, a hill in Northern Israel
- Dishon, an unclear biblical character
- Colleen Dishon (1924–2004), American journalist
- Jessica Dishon, a missing person discussed in episode 134 (2017) Cold Case Files reality legal show/documentary
