= Tel Ro'im West =

Prehistoric site in northern Israel

- Shown in Israel Tel Ro'im West (Eastern Mediterranean)
- Type: Tell
- Periods: Pre-Pottery Neolithic, Pottery Neolithic
- Location: Israel
- Region: Naftali Mountains, Israel

Site notes
- Excavation dates: 2004

Tel Ro'im West is a prehistoric archaeological site in the eastern slopes of the Naftali Mountains, where it descends into the Hula Valley in northern Israel. The site offers a variety of resources including water, animals, and plants. It is surrounded by fertile soil to its south and east. In 2004, prior to road construction work, a salvage excavation took place. Two areas were excavated and within them, four settlement phases (strata) from the Pre-Pottery Neolithic and Pottery Neolithic periods were uncovered. The findings represent a northern-Levantine material culture, which implies this region has been a boundary between the material culture of the northern and southern Levant.

The site is named after Tel Ro'im in the nearby valley, where some Roman burial tombs and Bronze Age pottery were found.
