= Ammuqa =

Ammuqa عموقه Amuka, 'Amuqa
- Village
- Etymology: "deep"
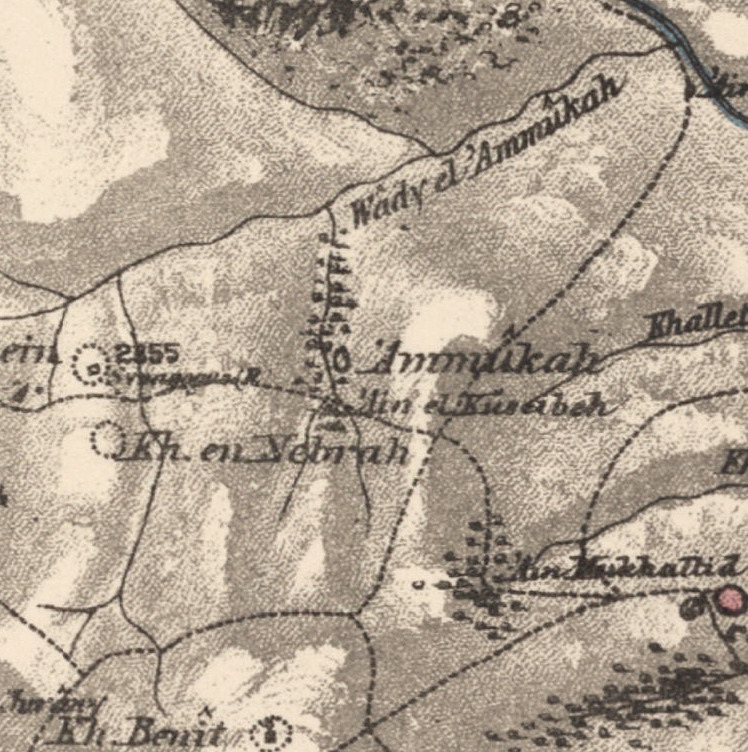
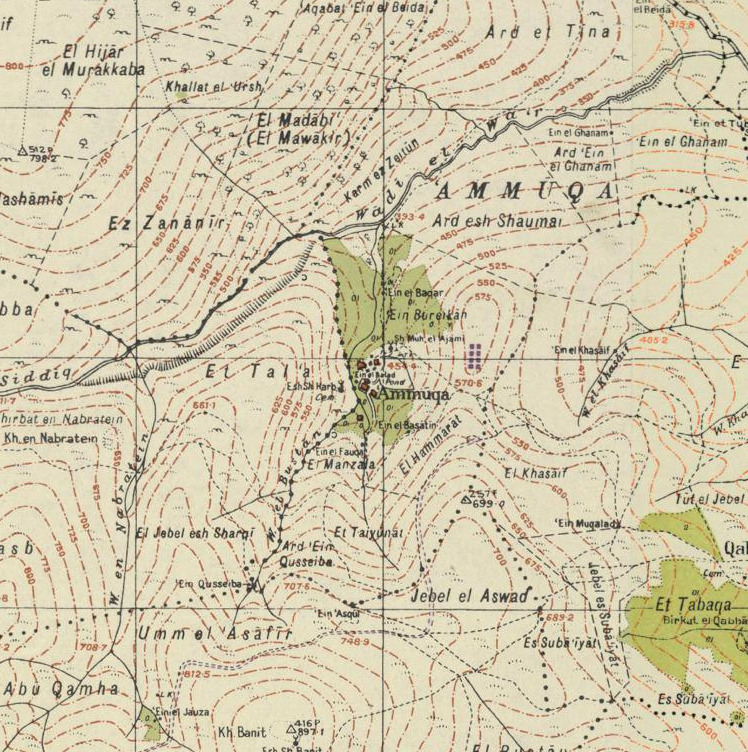
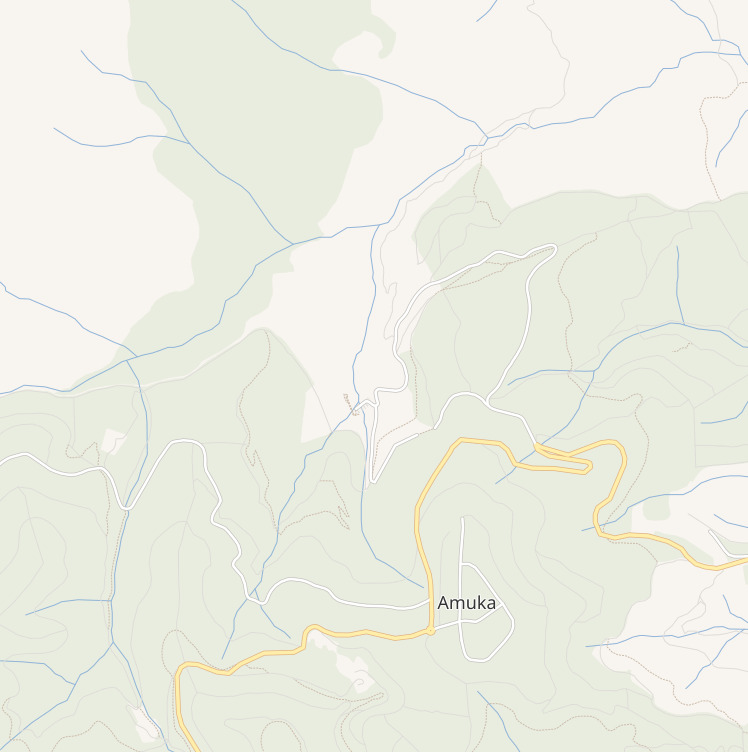
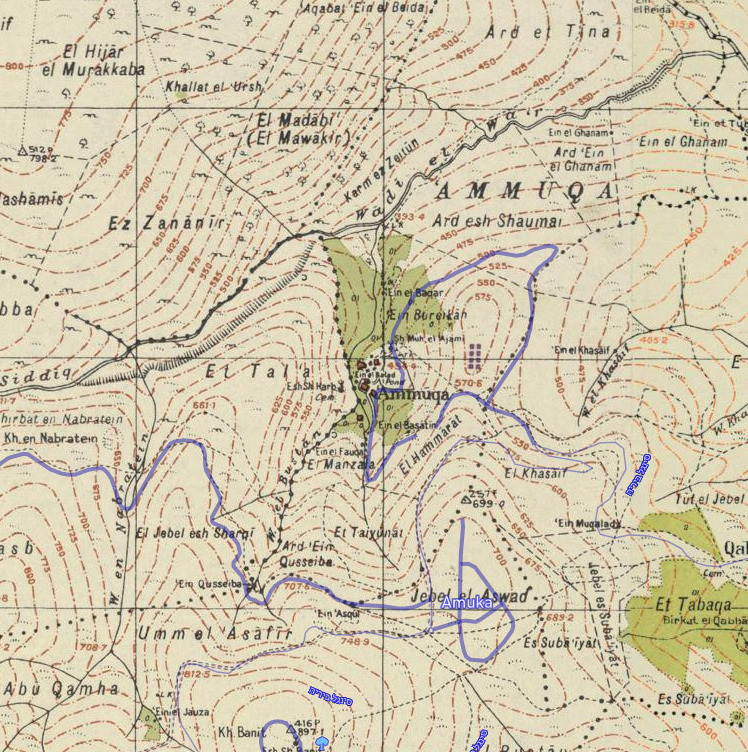
- 1870s map 1940s map modern map 1940s with modern overlay map A series of historical maps of the area around Ammuqa (click the buttons)

- Location within Mandatory Palestine
- Coordinates: 33°00′22″N 35°31′13″E
- Palestine grid: 198/267
- Geopolitical entity: Mandatory Palestine
- Subdistrict: Safad
- Date of depopulation: 24 May 1948

Area
  - Total: 2,574 dunams (2.574 km^{2}; 0.994 sq mi)

Population (1945)
  - Total: 140
- Cause(s) of depopulation: Military assault by Yishuv forces
- Current Localities: Amuka

Ammuqa (also transliterated 'Amuqa and Amuka) was a Palestinian village, located five kilometres northeast of Safed.

In the late 19th century, Ammuqa was one of several villages resettled by Algerian migrants under the auspices of the Ottoman Empire.

Ammuqa was depopulated by Israeli forces in May 1948.

== History ==
Known locally for its seven springs, Ammuqa also enjoyed renown as the site of the sepulchre of Jonathan ben Uzziel. Rabbi Samuel ben Samson, who travelled to Palestine in 1210, writes that the site was marked by "a great tree" where the local Muslim population made vows "to his glory" and gave votive offerings of oil and light.

=== Ottoman era ===
In 1517, Ammuqa was incorporated into the Ottoman Empire, and by 1596 tax-records it was under the administration of the nahiyah ("subdistrict") of Jira, part of Safad Sanjak, with a population of 65 households and 6 bachelors; an estimated 391 persons, all Muslim. They paid taxes on wheat, barley, olives, beehives, vineyards, and goats; a total revenue of 5,585 akçe. 1/12 of the revenue went to a Muslim charitable endowment.

In the second half of the 19th century Algerian followers of Abdelkader El Djezairi have been defeated by the French in Algeria, and sought refuge in another part of the Ottoman Empire. They were given lands in various locations in Ottoman Syria, including Ammuqa, and the close-by Dayshum, Marus, Al-Husayniyya and Tulayl. The inhabitants belonged to the tribe of Awlad bu Alwarath, from Dellys, Algeria.

=== British Mandate era ===
In the 1922 census of Palestine conducted by the British Mandate authorities, 'Amuqa had a population of 114, all Muslims, decreasing slightly in the 1931 census to 108, still all Muslims, in a total of 17 houses.

By the 1944/45 statistics, the village had a population of 140 Muslims with a total land area of 2,574 dunams. Of this, a total of 1,164 dunums of land was used for cereals; 195 dunums were irrigated or used for orchards, while 30 dunams were classified as built-up (or Urban) area.

=== 1948, aftermath ===
During the 1948 Arab–Israeli War, on the 24 May 1948, Ammuqa was assaulted by the Palmach's First Battalion, headed by Yigal Allon. Following the "systematic" destruction of the villages in the Hula Valley, Ammuqa was evacuated.

In 1980 Amuka was established on village land; about 1 km southeast of the village site.

In 1992 the village site was described: "Nothing remains of the village but the rubble of houses; the site is overgrown with cactuses and eucalyptus, fig, and olive trees. Much of the land around the site is wooded, and some parts are cultivated by the settlement of 'Ammuqa".

== See also ==
- Operation Yiftach
- Depopulated Palestinian locations in Israel

== Bibliography ==
- Abbasi, Mustafa (2007). "From Algeria to the Holy Land: Algerian communities in the Galilee, from the late Ottoman period to 1948 / הקהילה האלג'יראית בגליל משלהי השלטון העות'מני עד שנת 1948". Horizons in Geography / אופקים בגאוגרפיה (68/69): 56–72. ISSN 0334-3774. JSTOR 23716446.
- Adler, E.N. (2004). Jewish Travellers. Routledge. ISBN 0-415-34466-2.
- Barron, J. B., ed. (1923). Palestine: Report and General Abstracts of the Census of 1922. Government of Palestine.
- Conder, C.R.; Kitchener, H. H. (1881). The Survey of Western Palestine: Memoirs of the Topography, Orography, Hydrography, and Archaeology. Vol. 1. London: Committee of the Palestine Exploration Fund.
- Department of Statistics (1945). Village Statistics, April, 1945. Government of Palestine.
- Guérin, V. (1880). Description Géographique Historique et Archéologique de la Palestine (in French). Vol. 3: Galilee, pt. 2. Paris: L'Imprimerie Nationale.
- Hadawi, S. (1970). Village Statistics of 1945: A Classification of Land and Area ownership in Palestine. Palestine Liberation Organization Research Center. Archived from the original on 2018-12-08.
- Hütteroth, W.-D.; Abdulfattah, K. (1977). Historical Geography of Palestine, Transjordan and Southern Syria in the Late 16th Century. Erlanger Geographische Arbeiten, Sonderband 5. Erlangen, Germany: Vorstand der Fränkischen Geographischen Gesellschaft. ISBN 3-920405-41-2.
- Khalidi, W. (1992). All That Remains:The Palestinian Villages Occupied and Depopulated by Israel in 1948. Washington D.C.: Institute for Palestine Studies. ISBN 0-88728-224-5.
- Mills, E., ed. (1932). Census of Palestine 1931. Population of Villages, Towns and Administrative Areas. Jerusalem: Government of Palestine.
- Morris, B. (2004). The Birth of the Palestinian Refugee Problem Revisited. Cambridge University Press. ISBN 978-0-521-00967-6.
- Palmer, E. H. (1881). The Survey of Western Palestine: Arabic and English Name Lists Collected During the Survey by Lieutenants Conder and Kitchener, R. E. Transliterated and Explained by E.H. Palmer. Committee of the Palestine Exploration Fund.
- Rhode, H. (1979). Administration and Population of the Sancak of Safed in the Sixteenth Century. Columbia University. Archived from the original on 2020-03-01.
