= Al-Husayniyya, Safad =

Al-Husayniyya الحسينية Al-Husayniyya
- Village
- Etymology: Khirbat Al-Husayniyya: The ruin of el Hasanîyeh, named after Hasan ibn Ali
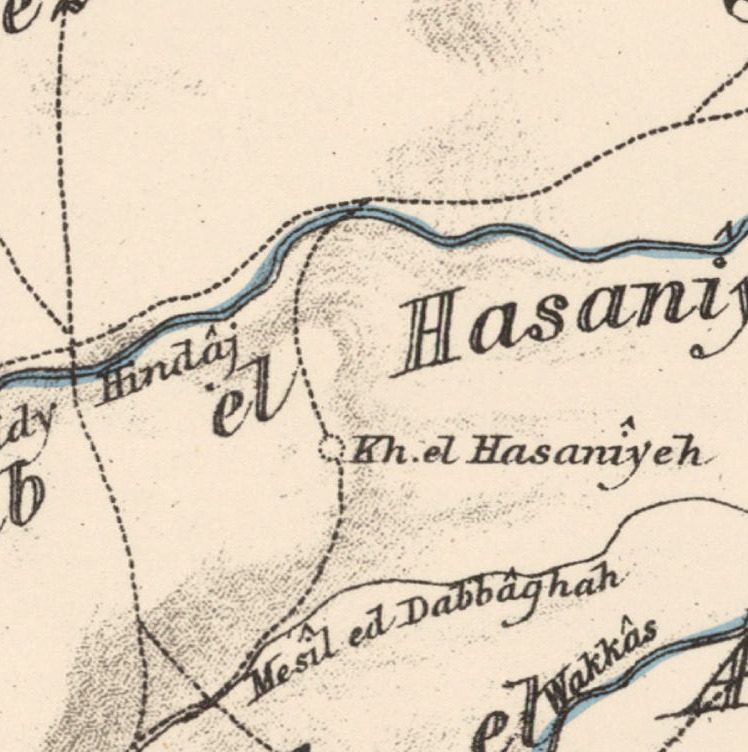
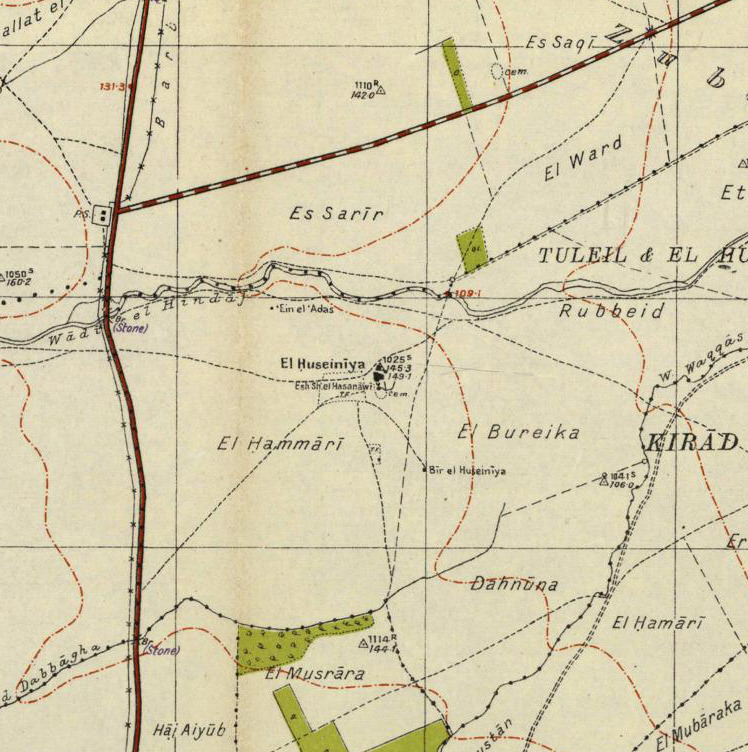
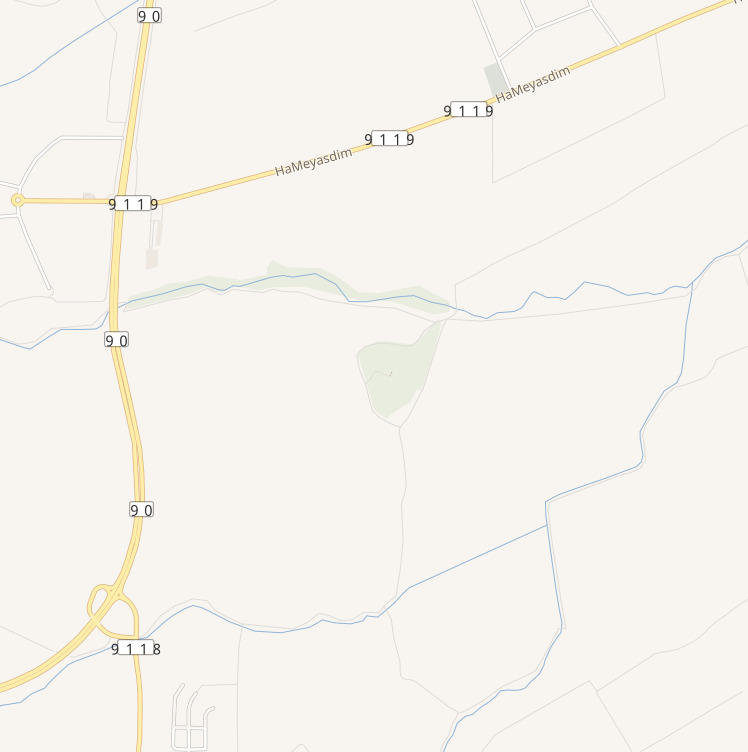
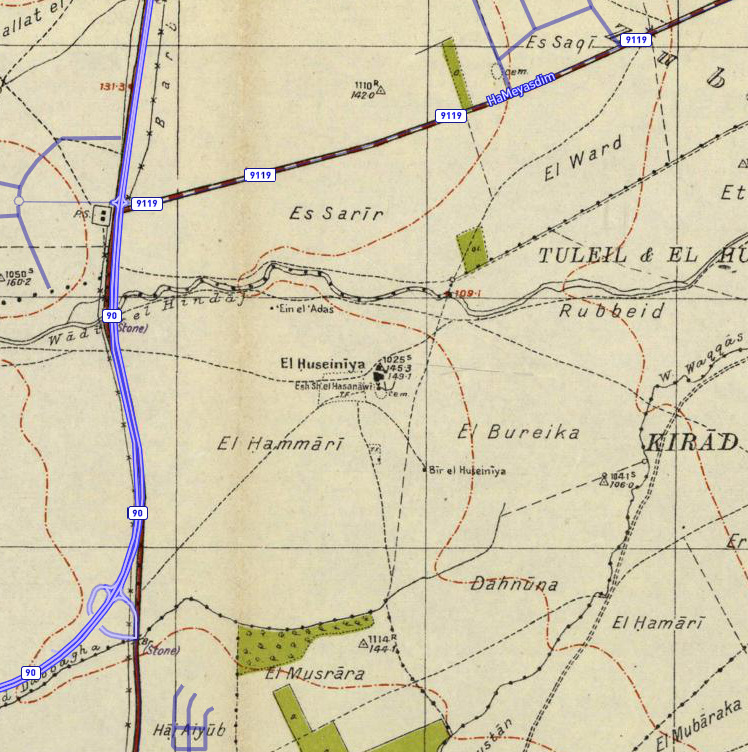
- 1870s map 1940s map modern map 1940s with modern overlay map A series of historical maps of the area around Al-Husayniyya, Safad (click the buttons)

- Location within Mandatory Palestine
- Coordinates: 33°02′23″N 35°34′58″E
- Palestine grid: 204/271
- Geopolitical entity: Mandatory Palestine
- Subdistrict: Safad
- Date of depopulation: 21 April 1948

Area
  - Total: 5,324 dunams (5.324 km^{2}; 2.056 sq mi)

Population (1945)
  - Total: 340 (together with Tulayl)
- Cause(s) of depopulation: Influence of nearby town's fall
- Current Localities: Chulata, Sde Eliezer

Al-Husayniyya (Arabic: الحسينية) was a Palestinian village, depopulated in 1948.

During the 1948 Palestine war, the village was attacked twice by the Palmach; first on 12 March 1948 and again on 16-17 March. Historian Walid Khalidi writes that over 45 villagers were killed in these attacks. Many in the village fled seeking shelter in Lebanon and Syria.

== Location ==
The village was located 11 kilometres northeast of Safed, on a slightly elevated hill in the southwestern corner of the al-Hula Plain. It stood along the eastern side of a highway that led to Safad and Tiberias.

== History ==
The Arab geographer Yaqut al-Hamawi noted its ancient buildings and praised one of them, which he claimed had originally been a temple and perhaps was built by Solomon.

=== Ottoman era ===
In 1881, the PEF's Survey of Western Palestine (SWP) described the place as having "a few ruined cattle-sheds".

In the second half of the 19th century, after the Algerian followers of Abdelkader El Djezairi had been defeated by the French in Algeria, they sought refuge in another part of the Ottoman Empire. They were given lands in various locations in Ottoman Syria, including al-Husayniyya, and the nearby villages of Dayshum, Ammuqa, Marus and Tulayl.

=== British Mandate era ===
In the 1922 census of Palestine, conducted by the British Mandate authorities, the Husainiyeh tribal area had a population of 127; all Muslims, increasing to 274 in the 1931 census; still all Muslims, in a total of 64 houses.

In the 1945 statistics the population the combined population of Tulayl and Al-Husayniyya was 340 Muslims, with a total of 5,324 dunams of land, according to an official land and population survey. All the villagers were Muslims. A total of 3,388 dunums was allocated to cereals and 22 dunums were irrigated or used for orchards for Tuleil and Al-Husayniyya. The villagers also kept livestock, especially water buffalo, for ploughing, dairy production, and meat.

=== 1948 war and depopulation ===
On the night of 12–13 March 1948, a Palmah strike against Husseiniyya resulted in a number of houses being blown up, and several dozen Arabs, who included members of an Iraqi volunteer contingent and women and children, were killed and another 20 wounded. According to reports, Husseiniyya's mukhtar was executed after being reassured by the raiders that he would not be harmed. The Palmah's Third Battalion lost three dead. According to Palmah reports cited by Morris, "the village was completely evacuated". Some of the villagers who escaped the massacres may have remained or returned in subsequent days; according to Israeli military intelligence, the residents of al-Husayniyya did not leave until 21 April.

The settlement of Chulata, established in 1937, is 3 km (2 mi) east of the site, near Tulayl. The settlement of Sde Eliezer is on village land, about 1 km (1 mi) west of the village site.

The Palestinian historian Walid Khalidi described the place in 1992: "Only piles of stone and sections of walls from demolished houses remain. The site itself is overgrown with thorns, grasses, and scattered Christ’s-thorn trees, and is used as pasture. The land in the vicinity is cultivated."

== See also ==
- Depopulated Palestinian locations in Israel
- Killings and massacres during the 1948 Palestine War

== Bibliography ==
- Abbasi, Mustafa (2007). "From Algeria to the Holy Land: Algerian communities in the Galilee, from the late Ottoman period to 1948 / הקהילה האלג'יראית בגליל משלהי השלטון העות'מני עד שנת 1948". Horizons in Geography / אופקים בגאוגרפיה (68/69): 56–72. ISSN 0334-3774. JSTOR 23716446.
- Barron, J. B., ed. (1923). Palestine: Report and General Abstracts of the Census of 1922. Government of Palestine.
- Conder, C.R.; Kitchener, H.H. (1881). The Survey of Western Palestine: Memoirs of the Topography, Orography, Hydrography, and Archaeology. Vol. 1. London: Committee of the Palestine Exploration Fund.
- Department of Statistics (1945). Village Statistics, April, 1945. Government of Palestine.
- Hadawi, S. (1970). Village Statistics of 1945: A Classification of Land and Area ownership in Palestine. Palestine Liberation Organization Research Center. Archived from the original on 2018-12-08.
- Khalidi, W. (1992). All That Remains:The Palestinian Villages Occupied and Depopulated by Israel in 1948. Washington D.C.: Institute for Palestine Studies. ISBN 0-88728-224-5.
- Mills, E., ed. (1932). Census of Palestine 1931. Population of Villages, Towns and Administrative Areas. Jerusalem: Government of Palestine.
- Morris, B. (2004). The Birth of the Palestinian Refugee Problem Revisited. Cambridge University Press. ISBN 978-0-521-00967-6.
- Palmer, E.H. (1881). The Survey of Western Palestine: Arabic and English Name Lists Collected During the Survey by Lieutenants Conder and Kitchener, R. E. Transliterated and Explained by E.H. Palmer. Committee of the Palestine Exploration Fund.
- Strange, le, G. (1890). Palestine Under the Moslems: A Description of Syria and the Holy Land from A.D. 650 to 1500. Committee of the Palestine Exploration Fund.
