= Marus, Safad =

Marus ماروس
- Etymology: Kh. Marus=the ruin of Marus, where "Marus" comes from a personal name.
- Location within Mandatory Palestine
- Coordinates: 33°01′43″N 35°31′42″E
- Palestine grid: 199/270
- Geopolitical entity: Mandatory Palestine
- Subdistrict: Safad
- Date of depopulation: 26 May 1948/ 30 October 1948

Population (1945)
  - Total: 80
- Cause(s) of depopulation: Influence of nearby town's fall
- Secondary cause: Military assault by Yishuv forces

Marus (Arabic: ماروس) was a Palestinian village in Upper Galilee, 7 km northeast of Safad. In the Roman and medieval period it had Jewish population, and by the 16th century it became entirely Muslim. After a period of desertion, the Ottoman authorities resettled it with Algerian Arabs in the 19th century. It was depopulated in 1948 during the Operation Hiram by the Israeli attacking brigade Sheva' Brigade.

== History and archaeology ==
=== Archaeology ===
In 1875, Victor Guérin found major ruins here. He described the place as a destroyed Arab village.

In 1881 the PEF's Survey of Western Palestine found here: "Modern and ancient ruins; a spring in a rock-cut cave, ancient foundations of good-sized stones; the foundations of a small rectangular building to the west of the eastern portion of the ruin. Some rock-cut tombs and many caves in hills around."

Starting in 1981 Zvi Ilan excavated in sites next to the 20th century village in different directions. Excavations revealed signs of a long-standing community, and Jewish presence at some periods. An ancient synagogue built in the late 4th or early 5th century, and a related Beth midrash of the 7th century, a cache of coins ranging from the 5th to 9th centuries, a necropolis partly of the 1st century CE, and sherds from Roman to early Ottoman period. There are remains of a defensive wall of large stones, and a hewn moat.

=== Written sources ===
==== Classical era ====
Based on the archaeological findings and the name Marus, archaeologist Zvi Ilan suggested Marus is to be identified with the town Meroth. Meroth (Ancient Greek: Μηρωθ) is mentioned by Josephus as a border town between Jewish Galilee and Tyre in the First Jewish–Roman War, and a place he fortified early in the war. Previous suggestions as to its location included Maroun al-Ras, and Meiron, which show less archaeological parallels. The name possibly derives from מערות (Me'arot, caves).

==== Middle Ages ====
Marus is probably mentioned in a Samaritan medieval manuscript, again as the border of Tyre, and in a pilgrimage guide of the 14th century.

==== Ottoman era ====
In 1596, Marus was part of the Ottoman Empire, a village in the nahiya (subdistrict) of Jira under the liwa' ("district") of Safad, with a population of 176. It paid taxes on a number of crops, including wheat, barley, and fruits as well as on goats. All the villagers were Muslim.

In the second half of the 19th century Algerian followers of Abdelkader El Djezairi have been defeated by the French in Algeria, and sought refuge in another part of the Ottoman Empire. They were given lands in various locations in Ottoman Syria, including Marus, and the close by Dayshum, Ammuqa, Al-Husayniyya, and Tulayl.

==== British Mandate era ====
In the British Mandate period the village was classified as a hamlet by the Palestine Index Gazetteer. In the 1922 census of Palestine, Marus had a population of 45; all Muslims, increasing in the 1931 census to 59, still all Muslims, in a total of 12 houses.

Grain cultivation and animal husbandry represented the chief sources of livelihood for the villagers. Figs as well as other fruits were also cultivated mainly to the east, northeast, and north of the site. Columns, tombs carved in rock, presses, and a cave with a carved stone entrance have been found at the site.

In the 1945 statistics the population was 80 Muslims, and the total land area was 3,183 dunums. Of this, 108 dunums were plantations and irrigable land, 903 used for cereals, while 8 dunams were built-up (urban) land.

==== Israeli rule ====
The village was occupied by the Israeli Defense Force's Sheva' Brigade, during the Operation Hiram at the close of 1948 Arab-Israeli war.

According to the Palestinian historian Walid Khalidi, describing the village land in 1992: "The site contains some olive and fig trees as well as stones from ruined homes. The surrounding land is used for grazing."

== See also ==
- Depopulated Palestinian locations in Israel

== Bibliography ==
- Abbasi, Mustafa (2007). "From Algeria to the Holy Land: Algerian communities in the Galilee, from the late Ottoman period to 1948 / הקהילה האלג'יראית בגליל משלהי השלטון העות'מני עד שנת 1948". Horizons in Geography / אופקים בגאוגרפיה (68/69): 56–72. ISSN 0334-3774. JSTOR 23716446.
- Barron, J.B., ed. (1923). Palestine: Report and General Abstracts of the Census of 1922. Government of Palestine.
- Conder, C.R.; Kitchener, H.H. (1881). The Survey of Western Palestine: Memoirs of the Topography, Orography, Hydrography, and Archaeology. Vol. 1. London: Committee of the Palestine Exploration Fund.
- Department of Statistics (1945). Village Statistics, April, 1945. Government of Palestine.
- Goodman, Martin; Jeremy Cohen; David Sorkin (2002). The Oxford Handbook of Jewish Studies. OUP Oxford. p. 841. ISBN 978-0-19-928032-2.
- Guérin, V. (1880). Description Géographique Historique et Archéologique de la Palestine (in French). Vol. 3: Galilee, pt. 2. Paris: L'Imprimerie Nationale.
- Hadawi, S. (1970). Village Statistics of 1945: A Classification of Land and Area ownership in Palestine. Palestine Liberation Organization Research Center.
- Ilan, Zvi (1983). "Marous — A Fortified Village of the First Revolt on the Northern Border of Eretz-Israel (Pls. יב–יא) / מרות' — יישוב מבוצר מתקופת המלחמה ברומאים בגבול הצפון". Eretz-Israel: Archaeological, Historical and Geographical Studies / ארץ-ישראל: מחקרים בידיעת הארץ ועתיקותיה. יז: 141–146. ISSN 0071-108X. JSTOR 23619498.
- Hütteroth, W.-D.; Abdulfattah, K. (1977). Historical Geography of Palestine, Transjordan and Southern Syria in the Late 16th Century. Erlanger Geographische Arbeiten, Sonderband 5. Erlangen, Germany: Vorstand der Fränkischen Geographischen Gesellschaft. ISBN 3-920405-41-2.
- Khalidi, W. (1992). All That Remains. Washington D.C.: Institute for Palestine Studies. ISBN 0-88728-224-5.
- Mills, E., ed. (1932). Census of Palestine 1931. Population of Villages, Towns and Administrative Areas. Jerusalem: Government of Palestine.
- Morris, B. (2004). The Birth of the Palestinian Refugee Problem Revisited. Cambridge University Press. ISBN 978-0-521-00967-6.
- Palmer, E.H. (1881). The Survey of Western Palestine: Arabic and English Name Lists Collected During the Survey by Lieutenants Conder and Kitchener, R. E. Transliterated and Explained by E.H. Palmer. Committee of the Palestine Exploration Fund.
- Rhode, H. (1979). Administration and Population of the Sancak of Safed in the Sixteenth Century. Columbia University. Archived from the original on 2020-03-01.
