= Tulayl =

Tulayl تليل
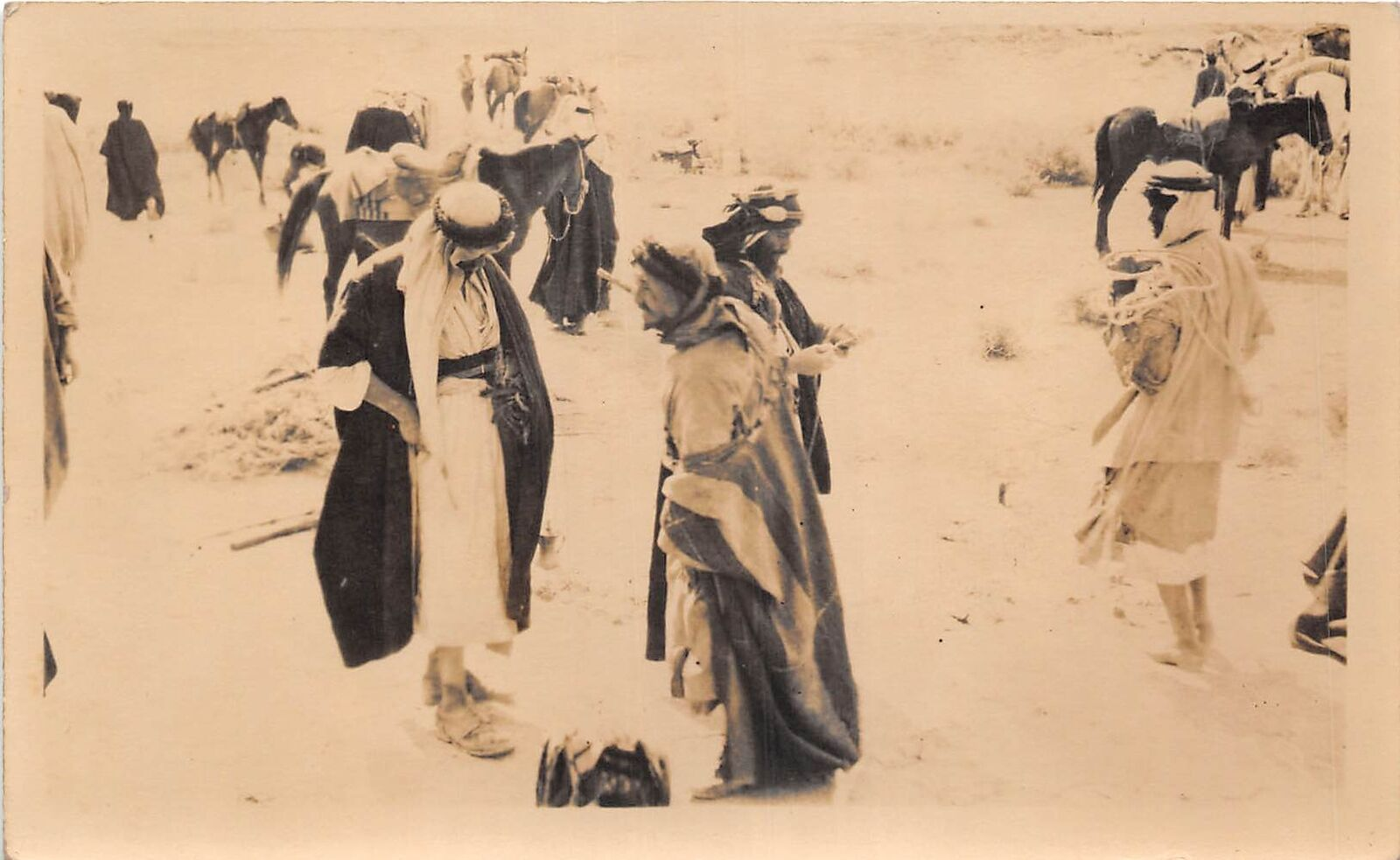
- People of Tulayl, before WWII
- Etymology: The small mound.
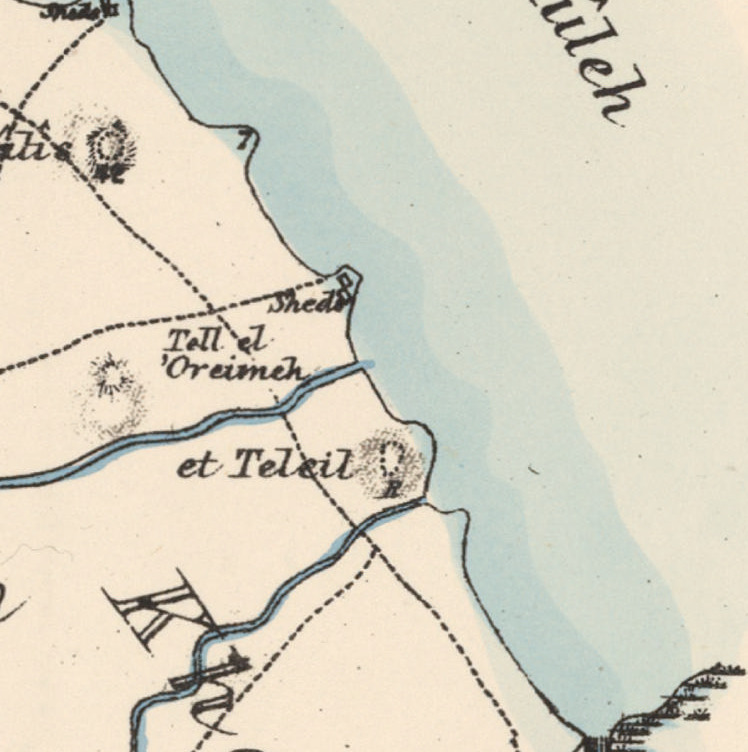
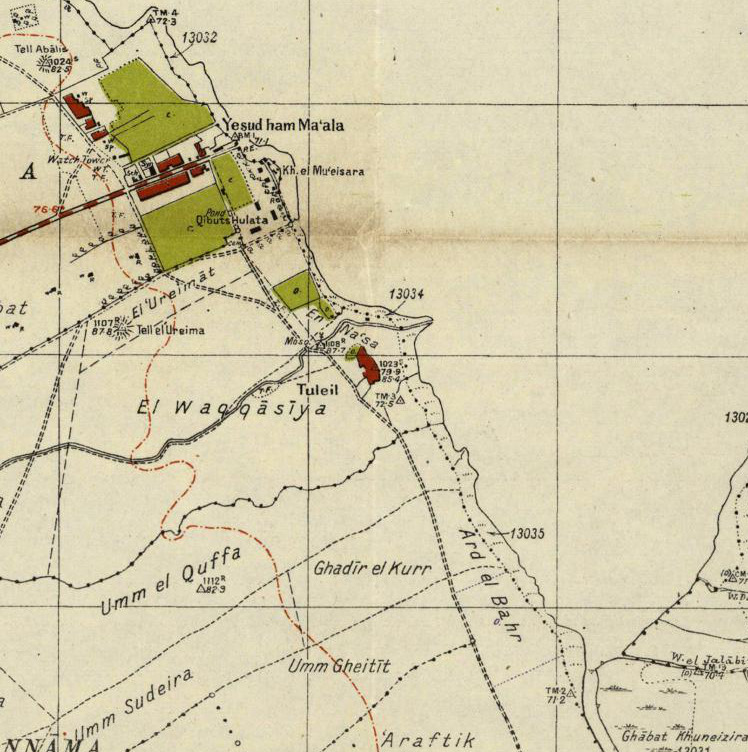
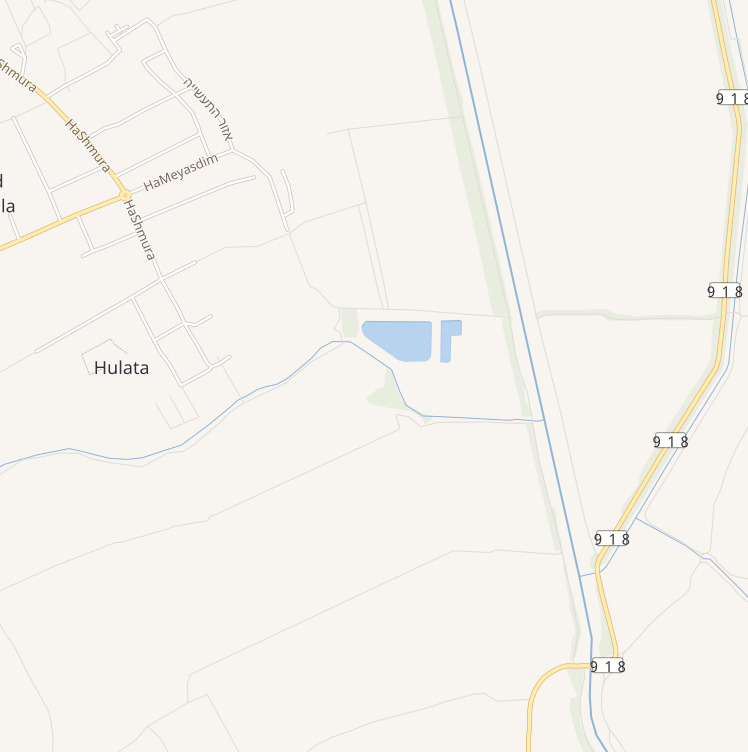
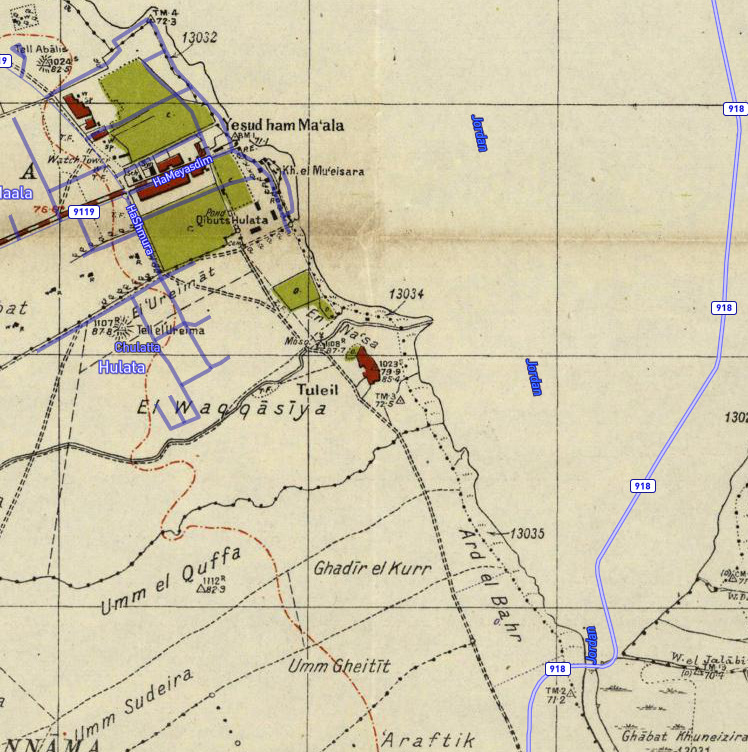
- 1870s map 1940s map modern map 1940s with modern overlay map A series of historical maps of the area around Tulayl (click the buttons)

- Location within Mandatory Palestine
- Coordinates: 33°03′03″N 35°37′12″E
- Palestine grid: 208/272
- Geopolitical entity: Mandatory Palestine
- Subdistrict: Safad
- Date of depopulation: late April 1948

Area
  - Total: 5,324 dunams (5.324 km^{2}; 2.056 sq mi)

Population (1945)
  - Total: 340 (together with Husayniyya)

Tulayl (Arabic: تليل) was a Palestinian Arab village in the Safad Subdistrict located 14.5 kilometers (9.0 mi) northeast of Safad. It was situated on a hill near Lake Hula. Together with the nearby village of al-Husayniyya, it had a population of 340 in 1945. Tulayl was depopulated during the 1948 Palestine War.

== History ==
The village was established atop the Roman period town of Thella, mentioned by the first century AD Jewish author Josephus as a village located near the Jordan River, marking the eastern boundary of Upper Galilee.

Archaeological discoveries from preceding eras include a fragment of an Aramaic dedication, dating from the 4th to 7th centuries CE, and the remnants of a medieval structure believed to be part of a synagogue.

=== Ottoman era ===
Under the Ottoman Empire, in 1596, Tulayl was a part of the nahiya ("subdistrict") of Jira, under the administration of Safad Sanjak, with a population of 215, or 36 households and 3 bachelors, all Muslims. They paid a fixed tax-rate of 25% on agricultural products, including wheat, barley, bees, and water buffalos; a total of 3,107 Akçe. 1/12 of the revenue went to a Waqf.

In 1881, the PEF's Survey of Western Palestine (SWP) described the place as having "modern cattle-sheds and traces of ruins of basaltic stone". The houses were built of adobe and cane. In the second half of the 19th century,after the Algerian followers of Abdelkader El Djezairi had been defeated by the French in Algeria, they sought refuge in another part of the Ottoman Empire, and were given lands in various locations in Ottoman Syria, including Tulayl, and the nearby villages of Dayshum, Ammuqa, Al-Husayniyya and Marus.

=== British Mandate era ===
In the 1922 census of Palestine conducted by the British Mandate authorities, Tulail had a population of 196; all Muslims. In the 1931 census it was counted with al-Husayniyya, and together they had a population of 274, still all Muslims, in a total of 64 houses.

During this period Tulayl expanded westward while al-Husayniyya expanded eastward, and the two became contiguous, sharing a school and other amenities. The population was Muslim, and were mostly farmers and fishermen. A large number of inhabitants were employed in cereal farming.

In the 1945 statistics the village area comprised a total area of 5,324 dunams.

Types of land use in dunams in the village in 1945:

Land Usage	Arab	Jewish
Irrigated and plantation	22	0
Cereal	3,388	1,637
Urban	48	0
Cultivable	3,410	1,637
Non-cultivable	113,116	

The land ownership of the village before occupation in dunams:

Owner	Dunams
Arab	3,556
Jewish	1,753
Public	15
Total	5,324

=== 1948, and aftermath ===
Tulayl was captured by Israel during its offensive Operation Yiftach in the 1948 Arab-Israeli War, probably according to Israeli historian Benny Morris in April 1948. According to Palestinian historian Walid Khalidi in 1992, "The village site is thickly covered with grass and other vegetation, including some eucalyptus and palm trees. Only one old stone house, with an arched doorway, remains standing."

== Sources ==
- Abbasi, Mustafa (2007). "From Algeria to the Holy Land: Algerian communities in the Galilee, from the late Ottoman period to 1948 / הקהילה האלג'יראית בגליל משלהי השלטון העות'מני עד שנת 1948". Horizons in Geography / אופקים בגאוגרפיה (68/69): 56–72. ISSN 0334-3774. JSTOR 23716446.
- Barron, J. B., ed. (1923). Palestine: Report and General Abstracts of the Census of 1922. Government of Palestine.
- Conder, C.R.; Kitchener, H.H. (1881). The Survey of Western Palestine: Memoirs of the Topography, Orography, Hydrography, and Archaeology. Vol. 1. London: Committee of the Palestine Exploration Fund.
- Hadawi, S. (1970). Village Statistics of 1945: A Classification of Land and Area ownership in Palestine. Palestine Liberation Organization Research Center.
- Hütteroth, W.-D.; Abdulfattah, K. (1977). Historical Geography of Palestine, Transjordan and Southern Syria in the Late 16th Century. Erlanger Geographische Arbeiten, Sonderband 5. Erlangen, Germany: Vorstand der Fränkischen Geographischen Gesellschaft. ISBN 3-920405-41-2.
- Khalidi, W. (1992). All That Remains:The Palestinian Villages Occupied and Depopulated by Israel in 1948. Washington D.C.: Institute for Palestine Studies. ISBN 0-88728-224-5.
- Mills, E., ed. (1932). Census of Palestine 1931. Population of Villages, Towns and Administrative Areas. Jerusalem: Government of Palestine.
- Morris, B. (2004). The Birth of the Palestinian Refugee Problem Revisited. Cambridge University Press. ISBN 978-0-521-00967-6.
- Palmer, E.H. (1881). The Survey of Western Palestine: Arabic and English Name Lists Collected During the Survey by Lieutenants Conder and Kitchener, R. E. Transliterated and Explained by E.H. Palmer. Committee of the Palestine Exploration Fund.
- Rhode, H. (1979). Administration and Population of the Sancak of Safed in the Sixteenth Century. Columbia University. Archived from the original on 2020-03-01.
