= Mayner =

Mayner is a surname. Notable people with this surname include:

- Atar Mayner (born 1991), Israeli rapper, singer and record producer
- Hed Mayner, Israeli fashion designer

== See also ==
- Gluckman Tang Architects, previously Gluckman Mayner Architects
