= Hed Mayner =

Israeli fashion designer

- Born: Amuka, Israel
- Education: Bezalel Academy of Arts and Design; Institut Français de la Mode
- Occupation: Fashion designer
- Years active: 2015–present
- Spouse: Riff Cohen
- Relatives: Atar Mayner (brother)
- Awards: Karl Lagerfeld Prize, LVMH Prize (2019); Landau Prize for Arts and Sciences (2023)

Hed Mayner is an Israeli fashion designer who regularly presents his menswear collections at Paris fashion week. He has won LVMH's Karl Lagerfeld prize.

Mayner was born in Amuka, in the Galilee, studied at the Bezalel Academy of Arts and Design and at the Institut Français de la Mode in Paris, and founded his label in 2015. He showed for the first time at Paris men's fashion week in June 2017. In 2019 he became the first Israeli designer to reach the final round of the LVMH Prize, and in 2023 he won the Landau Prize for Arts and Sciences of Mifal HaPais in the fashion design category. Based in Paris, he has directed the Reebok Ltd. line and was guest designer at Pitti Uomo in January 2026.

== Early life and education ==
Hed Mayner was born in Amuka in northern Israel. His mother is a painter and his father is a metalworker. He started his interest in fashion at the age of 16 and worked in leather, jewelry and hand sewing. At the age of 22 he started studying at the department of fashion and jewelry at Bezalel in Jerusalem and received his degree (with honors) in 2012. Mayner continued his fashion studies at Institut Français de la Mode in Paris. He grew up in a community of about 40 families near Amuka, a site of pilgrimage for Orthodox and Hasidic Jews, and has said that his interest in clothing began at 16 with the collection of Japanese kimonos owned by a neighbor.

== Career ==
Mayner presented a first collection in Tel Aviv in 2014, two years after finishing at Bezalel, describing it as a "rational masculine closet". It set European tailoring against military dress in a palette of black, white, olive, beige and faded denim, with double-breasted jackets cut with broad lapels, a trench coat with detachable sleeves and collarless bomber jackets. Mayner traced the tailoring to the Hasidic dress he encountered as a student in Jerusalem, which he described as aristocratic in feel and deliberately out of proportion.

Mayner returned to Israel and founded his brand in Tel-Aviv in 2015. In the same year he won a scholarship from Mifal HaPais. A year later, he was one of the five Israeli designers who were featured in the documentary series Fabric Stories, which was aired in yesDocu.

In 2017 Mayner became the first Israeli designer to present on the official calendar of Paris Fashion Week. By then he had appeared at Paris men's fashion week five times, previously through showroom presentations rather than on the official calendar.

The spring/summer 2018 collection he showed in Paris that June reworked garments associated with Israeli life, among them outerwear cut from army tent canvas and a sleeveless top made from a prayer shawl; Mayner told Agence France-Presse that much of his inspiration came from the military and religious dress of the country's different communities. He called it Temporary Import and had the invitations printed on copies of Israeli customs forms; the fifteen looks reflected a long-standing interest in uniforms, from those of Tibetan monks to army dress and Hasidic suits. Mayner developed and designed his collections in a studio in southern Tel Aviv while moving production successively to Turkey, Frankfurt and Paris, where he also ran a showroom and press office; by mid-2017 the label was carried by about 40 stores worldwide but was not sold in Israel.

Two years later he won the LVMH Karl Lagerfeld prize. He was one of eight finalists at the ceremony, held at the Fondation Louis Vuitton in Paris on September 4, 2019; the award, until then the jury's special prize, carried €150,000 and a year of mentoring by LVMH staff. It had been renamed that year in memory of Karl Lagerfeld, who had supported the prize since its creation in 2013 and had died earlier that year. Mayner was then based in Tel Aviv and sold in about 70 stores worldwide, and said he would use the prize money to open a studio in Paris so that he could concentrate on design.

=== Collaborations ===
Alongside his own label, Mayner has worked with other brands, including Reebok, for which he directed the Reebok Ltd. line. By late 2025 he had led Reebok's creative direction for two years, and his own collections, produced in Italy, were sold by retailers including Dover Street Market, United Arrows, Galeries Lafayette and Antonia.

=== Pitti Uomo ===
In October 2025, Pitti Uomo named Mayner guest designer of its 109th edition, held in Florence from January 13 to 16, 2026, announcing the appointment at the same time as that of the Japanese label Soshiotsuki. The main guest slot at the fair, previously given to designers including Raf Simons, MM6 Maison Margiela, Marine Serre, Martine Rose and Grace Wales Bonner, led Mayner to spend the six months before the show working from Italy, close to his manufacturers, rather than from Paris. CNN linked the two invitations to a wider shift in menswear away from streetwear and toward more restrained tailoring.

He presented his fall/winter 2026–27 collection at the Palazzina Reale, a 1930s building beside Santa Maria Novella station that houses the city's architects' association, showing menswear and womenswear together along with a further Reebok collaboration and a line of modular bags and leather-and-metal chains. He described the womenswear looks not as a separate women's line but as a way of widening the range of body types within the collection.

== Designs ==
Mayner's menswear is characterized by unisex designs with wide cuts and custom-made items. Vogue has described his military-inspired collections as drawing on traditional Orthodox Jewish tailoring. WWD has characterized his work as gender-fluid, built on shifts of proportion and on layering.

His clothes are built on classic tailoring reworked in generous proportions and layers, cut in fluid fabrics and neutral, natural tones. Wallpaper* has described him as treating tailoring as a form of armor, pushing suiting to extreme proportions and sculpting hunched silhouettes. From the spring/summer 2025 season his collections moved toward stronger color, and floral prints and softer shapes appeared for the first time in spring/summer 2026.

== Awards ==
In 2019, Mayner received the Karl Lagerfeld Prize, the special prize of the LVMH Prize for young designers. In September 2023 he was named the winner in the fashion design category of the Mifal HaPais Landau Prize for Arts and Sciences, one of nine recipients that year, each of whom received 150,000 shekels.

== Personal life ==
Mayner is married to the singer Riff Cohen. He is the older brother of the musician Atar Mayner.
