= Naftali Mountains =

Mountain range in Israel

Coordinates: 33.21°N 35.54°E

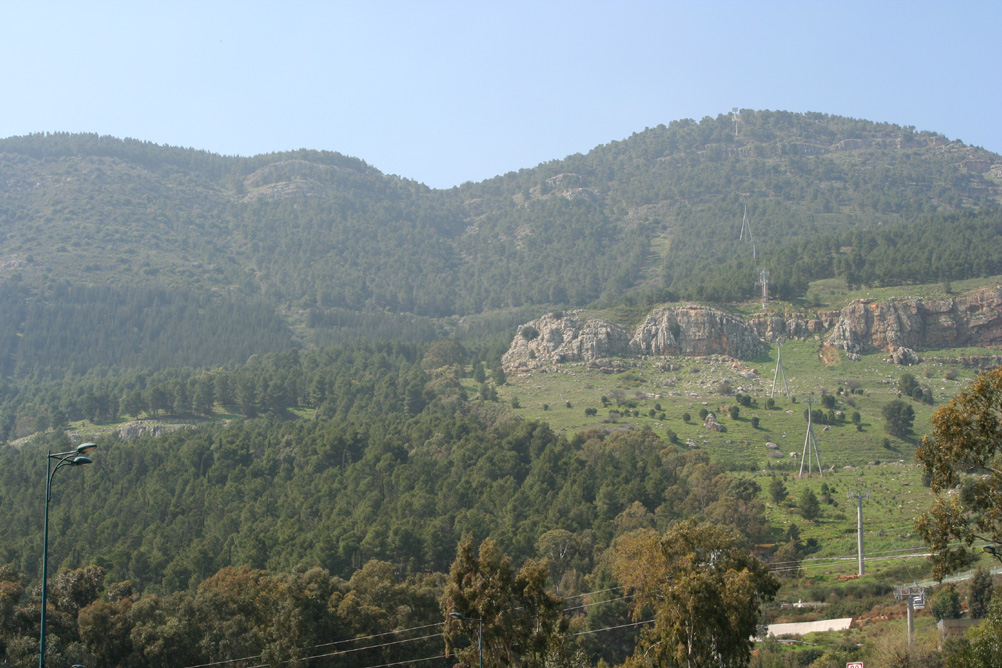

Highest point
- Elevation: 450–880 m (1,480–2,890 ft)

Dimensions
- Length: 25 km (16 mi)
- Width: 10 km (6.2 mi)

Naming
- Native name: Hebrew: הרי נפתלי

Geography
- Location: Upper Galilee, Israel; South Lebanon

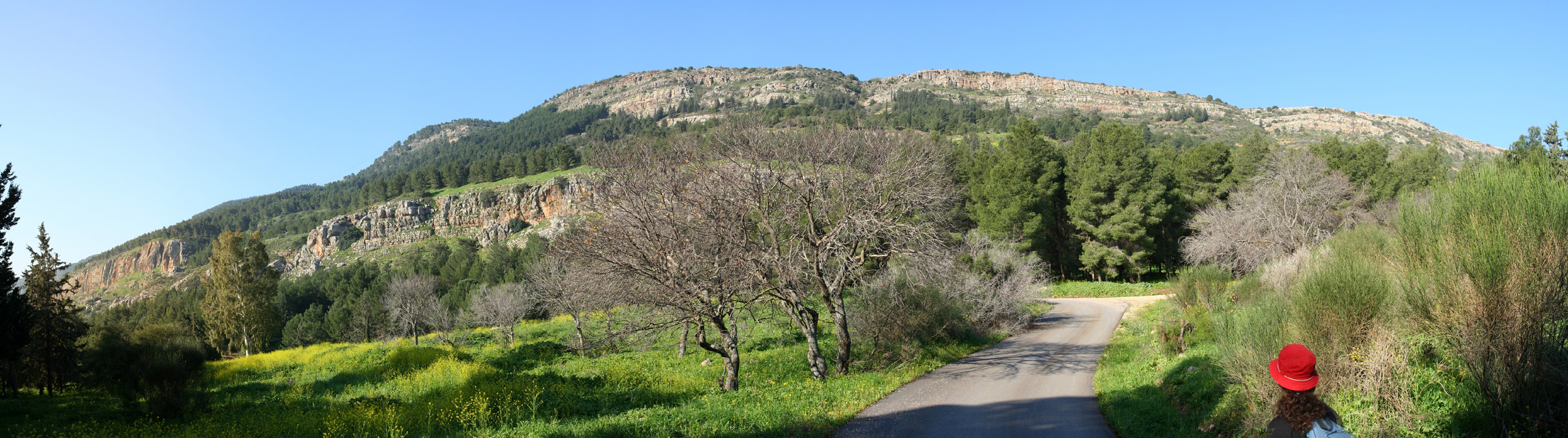
Cliffs of the Naftali Mountains

Naftali Mountains (Hebrew: הרי נפתלי) is a mountain range between Lebanon and Upper Galilee, Israel. The western side gradually changes into the highlands of southern Lebanon. The eastern side sharply descends into the Hula Valley of Israel.

They are a part of the watershed between the basins of the Mediterranean Sea and the Jordan River.

The area was the place of heavy fighting in 1948 during the 1948 Palestine war.

== Geography ==
The Israeli side of Naftali Mountains rises about 300 meters above the agricultural areas of Hula Valley. The southern part of the mountains is marked by the Dishon Stream. In the Lebanoni side, the northern border of the mountains is marked by the Litani River. The ridge's length is estimated to be about 25 km long and 10 km wide. The height of the ridge ranges between 450 and 880 meters high.

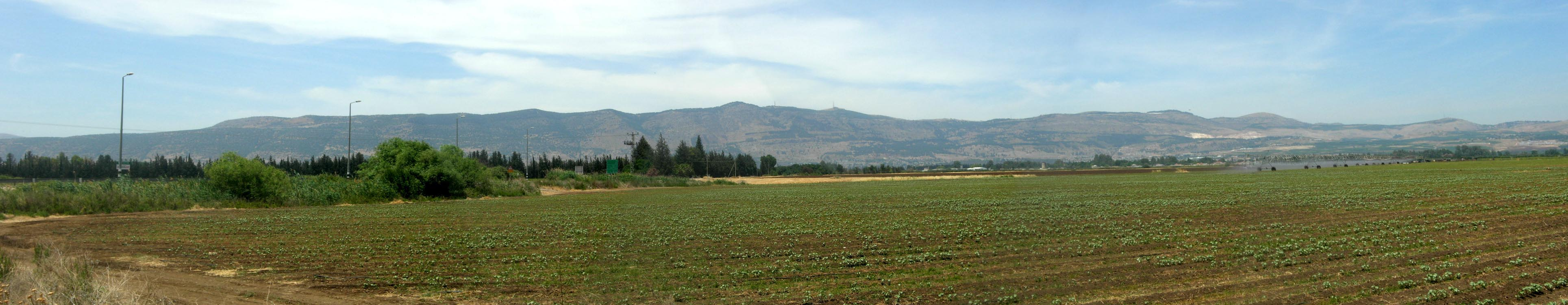
A panorama of the Ramim Ridge, the main ridge of the Naftali Mountains as seen from Hula Valley near Tel Anafa

Israeli populated places in the mountains (from north to south) are: Misgav Am, Margaliot, Manara, Ramot Naftali, Malkia, Avivim and Dishon.
