= Tel Barom =

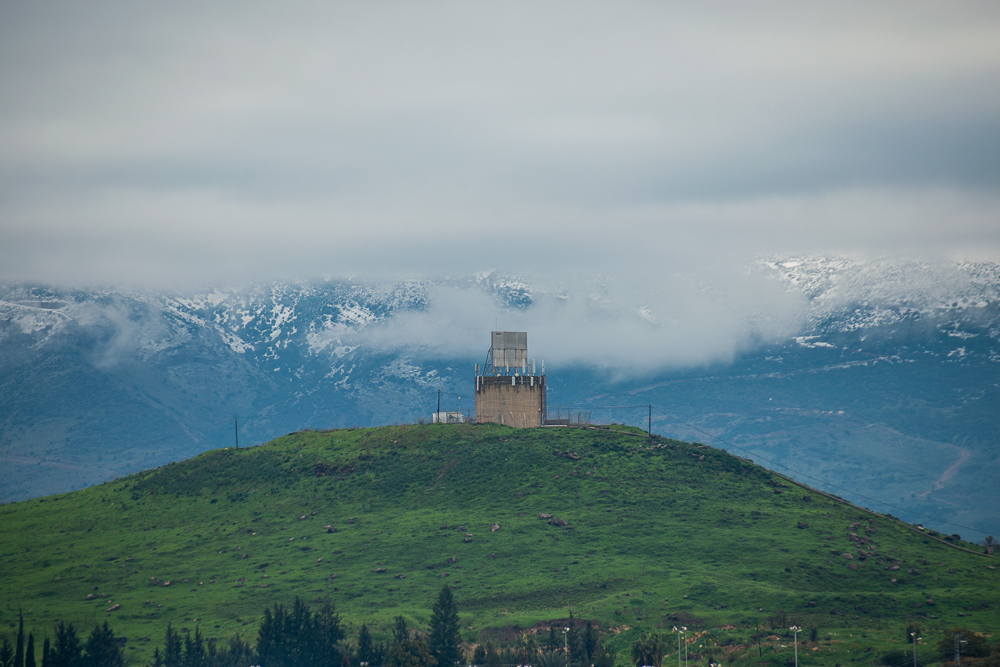
- Tel Barom with Mount Hermon in the background

- Shown in Israel
- 33°13′29.3″N 35°34′45.6″E
- Type: Tell
- Periods: Hellenistic, Roman, Byzantine, Early Islamic, Mamluk
- Location: Israel
- Region: Hula Valley, Israel

Site notes
- Excavation dates: 1966, 1998

Tel Barom is an archaeological site in the Hula Valley, between Kiryat Shmona and Metula. The site is situated on basalt hill, controlling the valley around it. Although the site's location has strategic advantage, only small villages existed on top of the hill, because of the lack of immediate water sources and the difficulty to dig wells and reserve pits.

== History ==
Two salvage excavations took place on the site. The first in 1966, headed by Micha Livne ahead of the construction of a water tower and the second in 1998, headed by Emanual Damati ahead of the installing of an underground electric line.

The settlement in Tel Barom was established during the rule of Seleucid Empire in the 2nd century BCE. The settlement existed through the Roman period and abandoned in the 2nd century CE. About 200 years later, the hill was settled again during the Byzantine period. The Byzantine settlement was a wealthy village. The builders made substantial leveling work and built the village according to an organized plan with alleys. The village had a large oil press, implying an extensive agricultural activity. The settlement was abandoned sometime after the Islamic conquest in the 7th century CE. The last main settlement phase occurred during the reign of the Mamluk Sultanate. The new village was poor and the residents did not put the Byzantine installations to work, implying they were probably shepherds. The settlement was abandoned in the 14th century.

== See also ==
- Tel Ro'im
