= Rachel Rabin =

Israeli educator and activist (1925–2026)

- רחל רבין
- Rabin in 2010
- Born: 1 February 1925; Tel Aviv, Mandatory Palestine
- Died: 11 September 2026 (aged 101); Kvutzat Kinneret, Israel
- Occupations: Educator, activist
- Known for: Founding member of kibbutz Manara
- Children: 4
- Relatives: Yitzhak Rabin (brother)

Rachel Rabin (Hebrew: רחל רבין; 1 February 1925 – 11 September 2026) was an Israeli educator and activist.

The younger sister of assassinated Israeli prime minister Yitzhak Rabin, she joined HaNoar HaOved VeHaLomed in her youth and helped establish kibbutz Manara. After Israel's formation, she became a teacher in the kibbutz, and later helped found the Har Vagai Regional School. She rose to prominence in the kibbutz movement, serving at the Ministry of Education as well as the kibbutz secretary for Manara. She lived in Manara until her evacuation due to the Hezbollah–Israel conflict in 2023.

== Early life ==
Rachel, Nehemiah, and Yitzhak (left to right) in 1940

Rachel Rabin was born at the Hadassah Medical Center in Tel Aviv on 1 February 1925. Her parents were Rosa (née Cohen), a Belarusian-born immigrant who was commander of the paramilitary organization Haganah in Haifa and a member of the Tel Aviv City Council, and Nehemiah, who was born in Ukraine as Nehemiah Rubitzov and later changed his surname to Rabin. He worked for the Israel Electric Corporation before quitting to participate in the defense of kibbutz Ramat HaKovesh during the 1936–1939 Arab revolt in Palestine. Rachel was born three years after her brother, Yitzhak, the future prime minister of Israel. Rosa died of cancer when Rachel was 12.

== Career ==
As a teenager, she joined HaNoar HaOved VeHaLomed, a youth movement affiliated with Labor Zionism. She was originally assigned to a group sent to establish kibbutz Revivim in the Negev, but later switched to a group that was sent to a training camp in Kfar Giladi in the Galilee. Eventually, the Jewish National Fund purchased land in Mount Menara and Rabin's group volunteered to settle there. The group arrived at the land in 1943 to establish kibbutz Manara; in an interview with Haaretz in 2009, she recalled that: "There was nothing here. Not even trees. We did everything little by little, with great difficulty. We believed in it deeply. It was our dream. And many gave up along the way." Her group would bring in barrels of water from nearby Lebanese villages. However, there was only enough water for cooking, so they would have to walk to Kfar Giladi every week to shower, which took approximately two hours.

During the 1948 Palestine war, most of the kibbutz was evacuated, although Rabin remained, serving as a medic and radio operator. By the early 1950s, she worked as a kindergarten teacher for the first generation of children born in Manara. She later taught at the kibbutz's elementary school. After her second class of students joined high school, she helped found the Har Vagai Regional School in Dafna.

In the 1960s, as she rose to prominence in the kibbutz movement, she was offered a seat in the Alignment political alliance to serve as a representative for the kibbutz movement to the Knesset, however she refused.

Between 1981 and 1986, she was the supervisory coordinator for the Ministry of Education's Rural Education Department, which was responsible for the secondary schools in kibbutzim and moshavim. After her term ended, she returned to Manara, where she served as the kibbutz secretary. In 1994, she became chairwoman of the Organization of Academic Colleges for Kibbutz Movement Education – Oranim College and the Kibbutz Seminar. That same year, Yitzhak invited her to the Nobel Peace Prize ceremony in Oslo after winning the prize alongside Shimon Peres and Yasser Arafat.

Two weeks before Yitzhak was assassinated in 1995, she went to the United Kibbutz Movement headquarters in Tel Aviv, warning that "The street is running wild, and no one is doing anything. He [Yitzhak Rabin] is not being guarded properly." After Yitzhak's assassination, Rabin became devoted to preserving his legacy and promoting tolerance, giving lectures at the Yitzhak Rabin Center to generations of Israelis.

== Personal life and death ==
During the 1948 Palestine war, she married Rafi Yaakov, who had moved to Manara in 1945 after immigrating from Germany. They had three children, Tirzah, Yiftach, and Gadi, and adopted a fourth, Binya Jadidi, whose family had made aliyah from Persia. Rafi died in 2012.

Rabin lived in Manara for 80 years, until her evacuation due to the outbreak of the Hezbollah–Israel conflict after the 7 October attacks in 2023. She relocated to Kvutzat Kinneret, where she celebrated her 100th birthday. She did not return to Manara due to her medical condition.

Rabin died on 11 September 2026, at the age of 101. Her funeral was scheduled to take place at Kibbutz Manara on 14 September. She was eulogized by president Isaac Herzog, who described her as a leading figure in the kibbutz movement.
