= Dishon =

Moshav in northern Israel

Dishon: דישון (Hebrew)
- Moshav
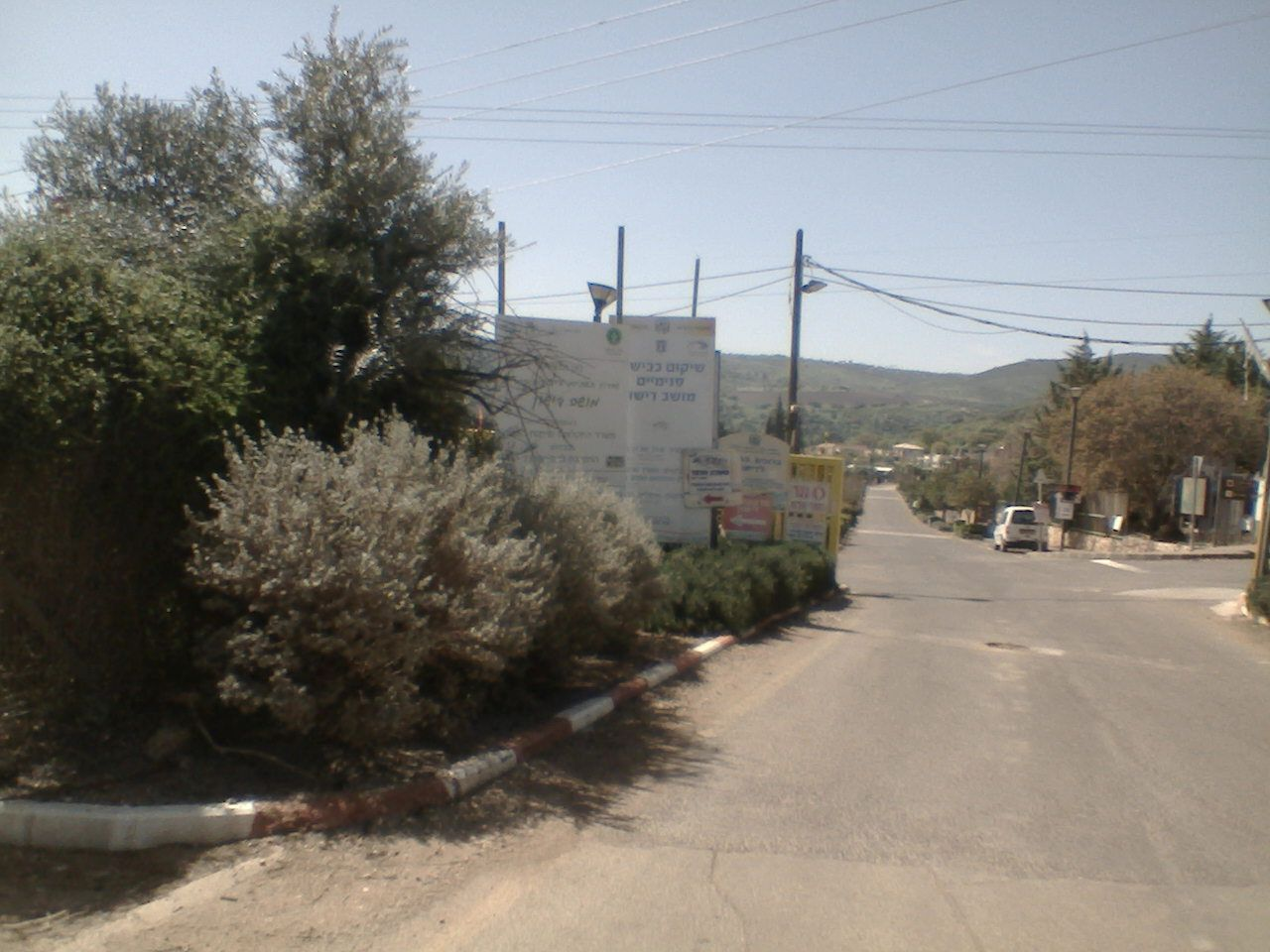

- Location within Northeast Israel Location within Israel
- Coordinates: 33°4′54″N 35°31′1″E
- Country: Israel
- District: Northern
- Subdistrict: Safed
- Council: Mevo'ot HaHermon
- Affiliation: HaOved HaTzioni
- Founded: 1953
- Founder: Libyan Jews
- Population (2024): 419

Dishon (Hebrew: דישון) is a moshav in northern Israel. It is located near the border with Lebanon, within the Naftali Mountains, near the Dishon Stream. It falls under the jurisdiction of Mevo'ot HaHermon Regional Council. As of 2024 it had a population of 419.

== History ==
Dishon was established in 1953 by Jewish immigrants from Libya, at the location of the former Palestinian village of Dayshum which was depopulated during the 1948 Arab-Israeli War. Its name is a variation of the name of the Palestinian village.

Dishon ATVs is the oldest ATV tours company in Israel, offering offroad trips by ATV and jeep in the Galilee, Hula Valley and Golan Heights.

In the 2023 conflict between Hamas and Israel, Hezbollah targeted northern Israeli border communities, forcing evacuations, including in Dishon.
