= Manara, Israel =

Kibbutz in northern Israel

Manara: מנרה (Hebrew)
- Kibbutz
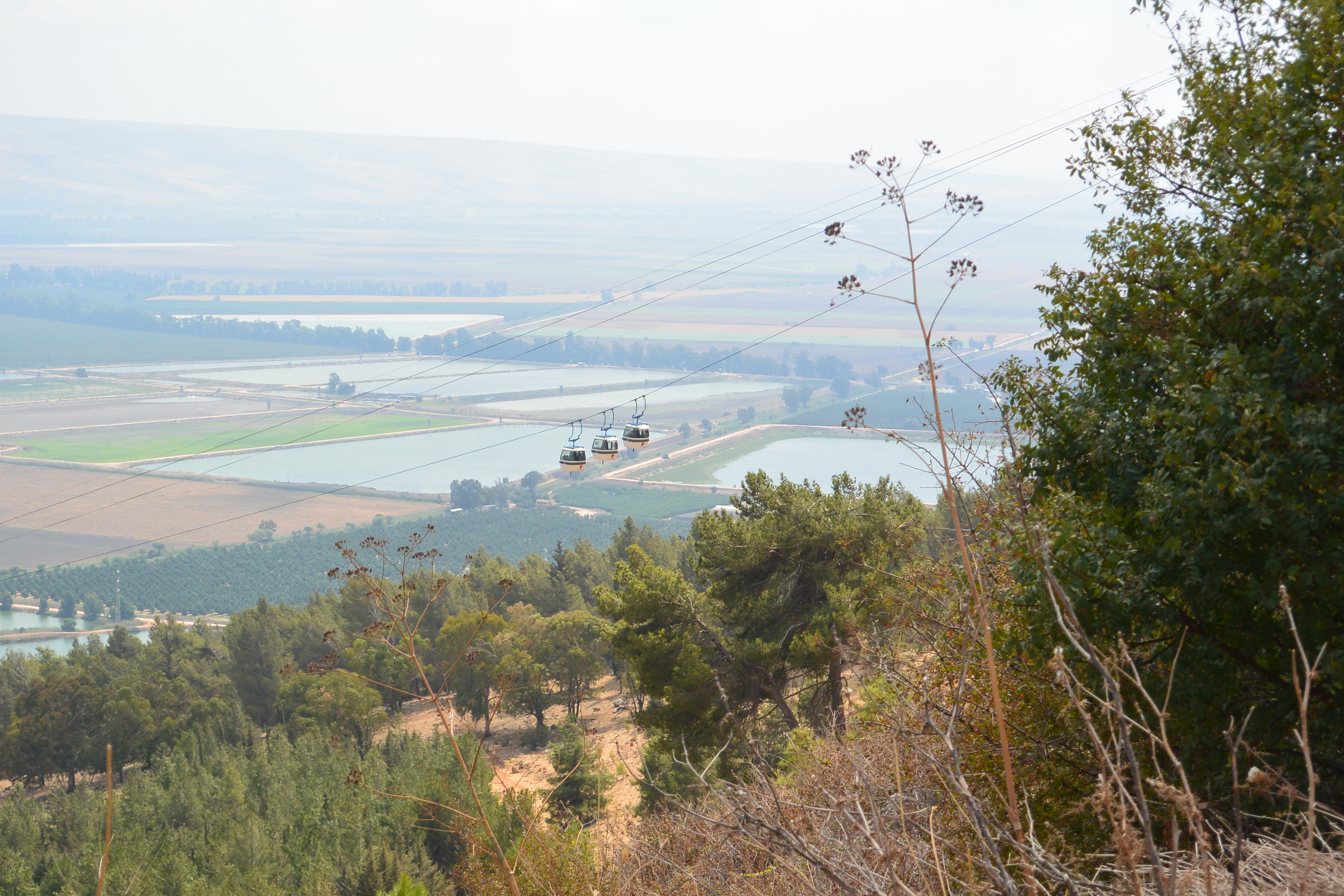
- Manara cable car

- Location within Northeast Israel Location within Israel
- Coordinates: 33°11′45″N 35°32′40″E
- Country: Israel
- District: Northern
- Subdistrict: Safed
- Council: Upper Galilee
- Affiliation: Kibbutz Movement
- Founded: 1943
- Founder: German and Polish Jews and HaNoar HaOved members
- Population (2024): 314
- Website: manara.co.il

Manara (Hebrew: מנרה) is a kibbutz in northern Israel. Located in the Naftali Mountains of the Upper Galilee, near the Lebanese border and the city of Kiryat Shmona, it falls under the jurisdiction of Upper Galilee Regional Council. In 2024 it had a population of 314.

== History ==
=== Background ===
The site was formerly inhabited by Palestinians, when it was known as Khirbet el-Menarah, 'the Ruin of the Lighthouse'. In 1881, the PEF's Survey of Western Palestine (SWP) described it as "ruins of a modern Arab village, several rock-cut cisterns, and one wine-press".

In the 1940s, 2538 dunams of land were purchased by the Jewish National Fund from Asa'ad Bey Khuri of Beirut.

=== 1940s ===
Manara was established in 1943 by members of the HaNoar HaOved VeHaLomed youth group and young immigrants from Germany and Poland. Leon Uris used an incident from the history of the kibbutz in his novel, Exodus. The scene of the night hike with the children from the fictional kibbutz Gan Dafna as it faced attack, was based on the war-time transport of the children of kibbutz Manara from the mountaintop to what was presumed to be a safer place on the valley floor. Former Prime Minister Yitzhak Rabin's sister Rachel Rabin was a founding member.

In June 1948 the kibbutz requested land near the newly depopulated Arab village of Qadas (which was formerly the Israelite town of Kedesh in ancient times), as it was "suitable for winter crops."

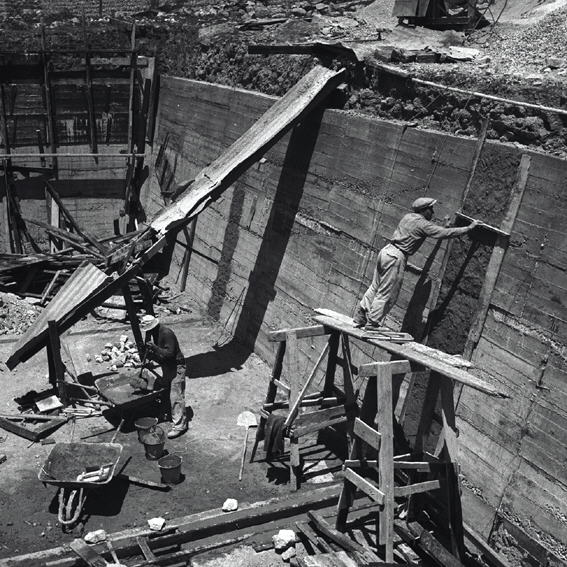
Manara under construction, 1944

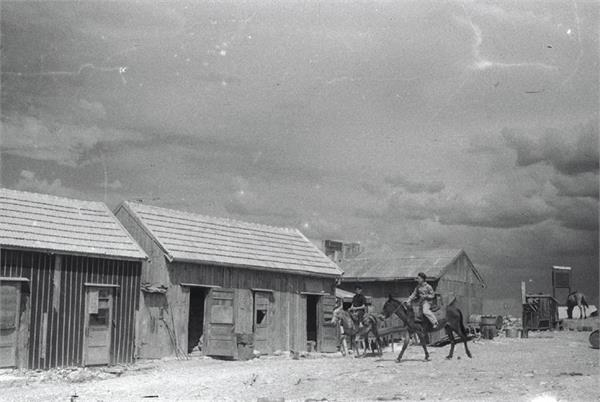
Manara barracks, 1944

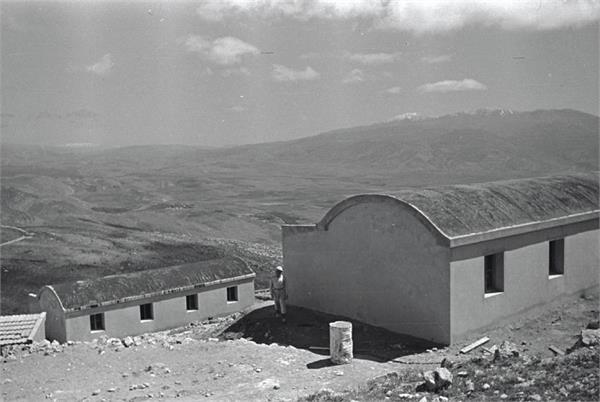
Manara, 1944

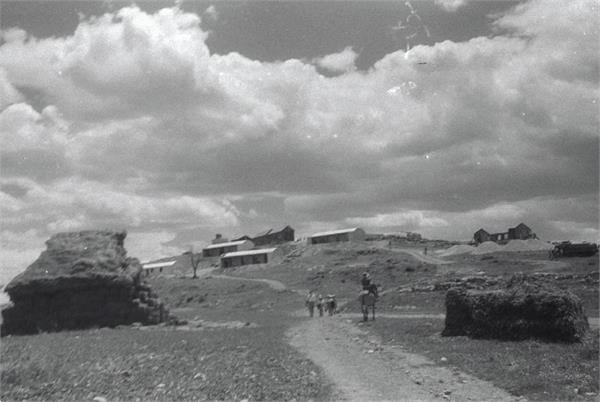
Manara, 1944

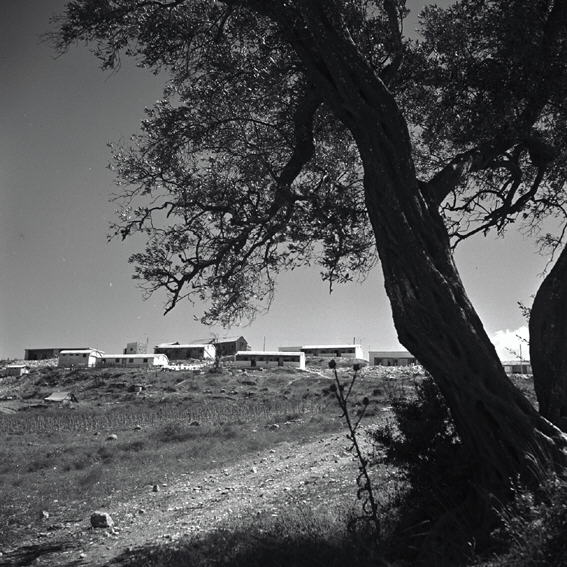
Manara, 1947

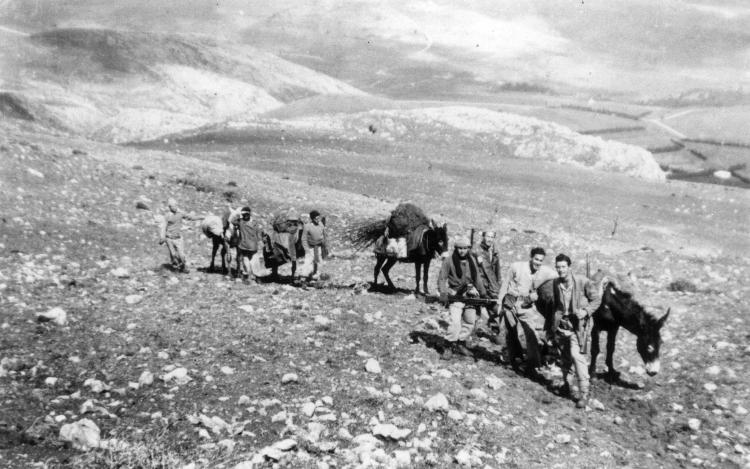
Yiftach Brigade bringing supplies to kibbutz Manara, 1948

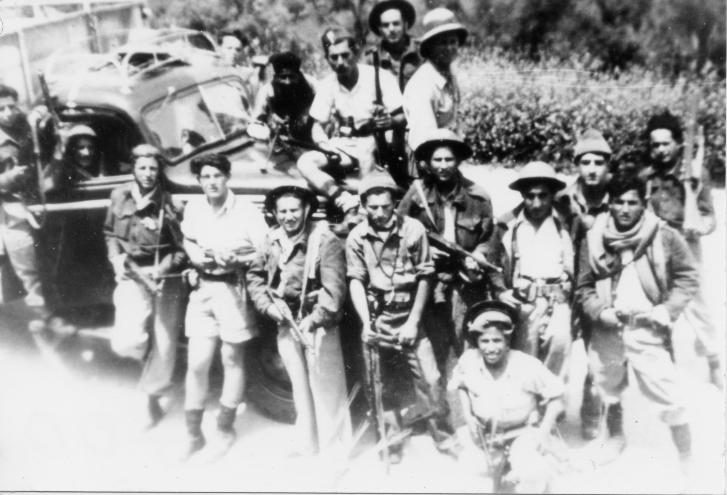
Bulgarian Company of Yiftach Brigade with a convoy to Manara, 1948

=== Since 2000 ===
The Manara bypass project was completed in 2005 to provide safe access to the kibbutz. Manara is 888 metres above sea level and is a rare style for a kibbutz, with apartments providing the accommodation, due to the limited space.

During the war triggered by the October 7, 2023 Hamas onslaught, northern Israeli border communities, including Manara, faced targeted attacks by Hezbollah and Palestinian factions based in Southern Lebanon and were evacuated. On October 19 2023, at least two anti-tank missiles were fired from Lebanese territory, hitting Manara without causing any casualties.

By August 2025, 75% of the kibbutz buildings and infrastructure had been destroyed by rockets and drones during the 14-month war with Hezbollah. Of the 260 residents of Manara, only 40% had returned, far less than the c. 74% returnees counted over the entire northern area where the population had been evacuated during the war. A group of 10 demobilised IDF soldiers who had fought in the north started an initiative, "Shuvu Manara" ('Back to Manara"), whose goal was to rebuild the kibbutz, motivate members to return, and join them in living there. There was an expectation that 60-70% of the initial residents would return by the end of 2025.

== Economy ==
Manara's main industries are agriculture (primarily cotton fields, apples and chickens), tourism to the scenic cliffs via its cable car descending from the Upper Manara Cliff down to Kiryat Shmona in the valley below, and a technical glass manufacturing plant.

== Notable people ==
- Rachel Rabin, sister of Yitzhak Rabin

== See also ==
- Recanati winery
- Tel Kedesh

== Bibliography ==
- Conder, C.R.; Kitchener, H.H. (1881). The Survey of Western Palestine: Memoirs of the Topography, Orography, Hydrography, and Archaeology. Vol. 1. London: Committee of the Palestine Exploration Fund.
- Palmer, E.H. (1881). The Survey of Western Palestine: Arabic and English Name Lists Collected During the Survey by Lieutenants Conder and Kitchener, R. E. Transliterated and Explained by E.H. Palmer. Committee of the Palestine Exploration Fund.
