= Ivy Lawrence Maynier =

Canadian lawyer (1921-1999)

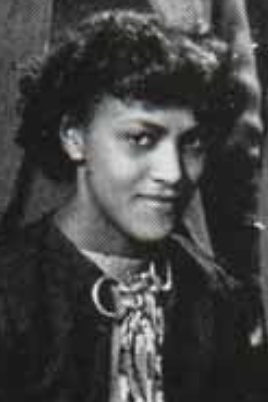
- Ivy Lawrence, from the 1940 yearbook of McGill University
- Born: Ivy Marjorie Lawrence; 29 January 1921; Montreal, Quebec, Canada
- Died: 31 May 1999 (aged 78); Toronto, Ontario, Canada
- Education: McGill University, 1942; University of Toronto Faculty of Law, 1945
- Occupations: Lawyer; educator
- Spouses: Pierre Gemma (m. 1955; div. 1956); Earle Maynier (m. 1959; died 1972)

Ivy Marjorie Lawrence Maynier (née Lawrence; 29 January 1921 – 31 May 1999) was a Canadian lawyer, educator, and diplomatic hostess. She was the first woman of colour to graduate from the University of Toronto Law School.

== Early life and education ==
Lawrence was born Ivy Marjorie Lawrence on 29 January 1921 in Montreal, the daughter of Alexander W. Lawrence and Bernice Herbert Lawrence. Her parents moved to Canada from Trinidad (then part of the British West Indies) in 1919. She graduated from McGill University in 1942, and received a scholarship to attend law school at the University of Toronto. In college, she was the first woman to be awarded the McGill Debating Key, when she was president of the Women's Debating Union. In 1945 she was the first woman of colour to graduate from the University of Toronto's law school, and the first student there to earn an honours degree in international law.

== Career ==
Lawrence was called to the bar in England in 1947; she was also a member of the bar in Trinidad and Tobago, and in Barbados. She worked for the United States Information Service in Paris. She later taught at the University of the West Indies in Jamaica, where she was also the school's assistant registrar. She lived in Ottawa in the 1960s, and was a diplomatic hostess while her husband was Jamaica's High Commissioner to Canada. In 1964 she praised the potential of television for education, as one of Jamaica's delegates to the Commonwealth Education Conference.

== Personal life and legacy ==
Lawrence was engaged to fellow law student Peter Harry Fuld, but his mother forbid their marriage. She married Pierre Gemma in 1955; they divorced within the year. She was the third wife of Jamaican diplomat Earle Maynier; they married in 1959. Her husband died in 1972, and she died in 1999, in her seventies, at a hospital in Toronto.
