= Earle Maynier =

Jamaican diplomat (died 1972)

Earle Maynier (died September 1972) was a Jamaican diplomat who served as Jamaica's High Commissioner to Canada from 1962 to 1965. Maynier also played a part in the Trade Liberalization Proposals that were made by the West Indies. He graduated from the London School of Economics in 1944. He also attended the University of Toronto.

Maynier was the chief economic advisor to two prime ministers, Alexander Bustamante, the first prime minister of the country, and to Norman Washington Manley, who served as the second prime minister of Jamaica.

Earle Maynier was married to Elsie Solomon Hylton. They had two daughters, Helen and Shirley. His second wife was Dr. Hyacinth Lightbourne, who was among the first three female Jamaican doctors in the nation. She was a graduate of the University of London Medical School. His third wife was Ivy Lawrence, a graduate of McGill University. She received her law degree from the University of Toronto.
