= Amuka, Israel =

Community settlement in Northern District, Israel

Amuka: עמוקה (Hebrew)
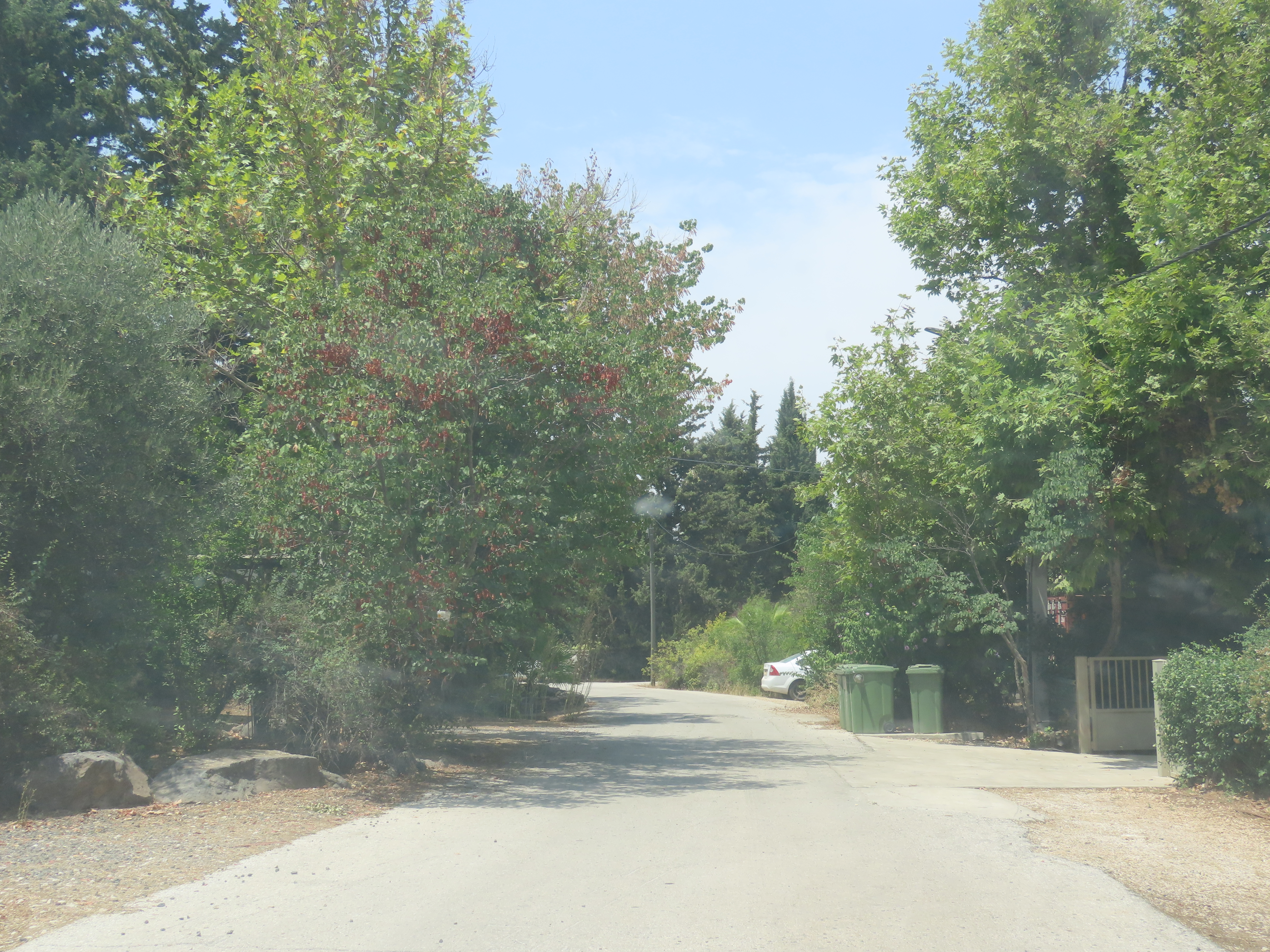
- Etymology: Deep
- Location within Northeast Israel Location within Israel
- Coordinates: 32°59′53″N 35°31′27″E
- Country: Israel
- District: Northern
- Subdistrict: Safed
- Council: Merom HaGalil
- Founded: 1980
- Population (2024): 153

Amuka (Hebrew: עמוקה, lit. 'Deep') is a community settlement about 6 km northeast of Safed in the Upper Galilee in northern Israel. It belongs to the Merom HaGalil Regional Council. In 2024 it had a population of 153.

== History ==
An ancient site in a valley 1 km north of the community is sometimes identified as Kfar Amiko of the Talmud, but that identification is generally made with Amqa. As Ammuqa, it had a Jewish population in the early Islamic and Crusader periods and into the 12th century. However, by the 16th century it was a Muslim village. In the early 19th century it was settled by Algerians. In 1948 it was depopulated by the Israeli army.

The ancient site is best known as the traditional resting place of Yonatan Ben Uziel who was a student of Hillel the elder, of the first century BCE. The first description of the tomb was provided by Yaakov ben Netanel HaKohen in the second half of the 12th century, where he marvels at how the Jews managed to cut the graves into the mountain. Moshe Bassola also visited the site in 1522, and he describes that when he arrived, there was no Jewish settlement there, only graves. A tomb there is the site of annual pilgrimage.

The modern community settlement south of the ancient site was established in 1980.

== Education ==
Children in the community attend schools in the nearby city of Safed or other nearby villages: "Nof Harim" elementary school in Sasa, "Anne Frank" high school in Sasa, "Har VeGai" high school, and Einot Yarden high school.

== Synagogue ==
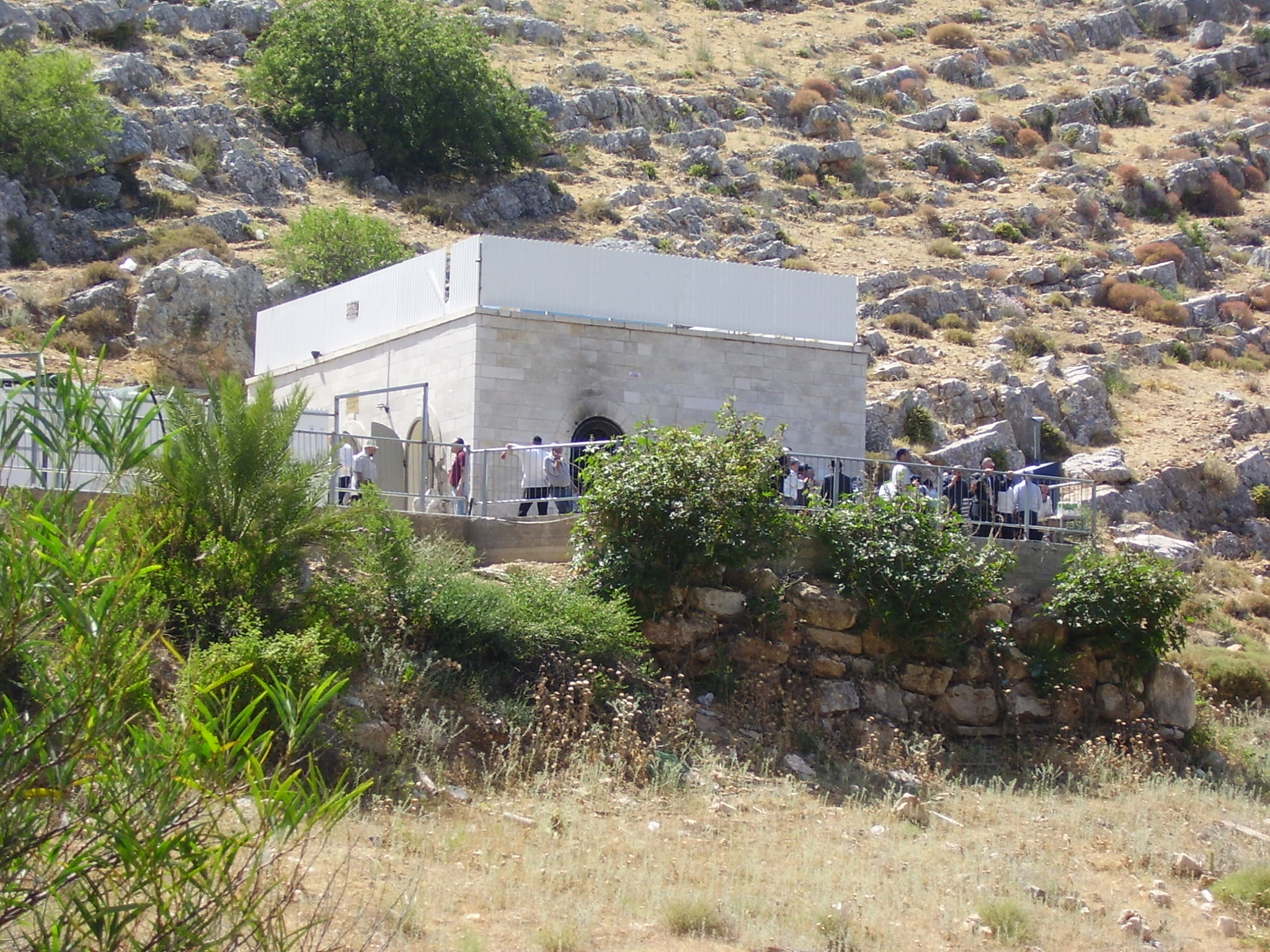
Shrine in Amuka

There is a large ruined building above the burial place of Jonathan ben Uzziel. In the 19th century, the explorer Victor Guérin saw there "the base of a pillar and a number of hewn stones - the remnants of an old structure, possibly a synagogue."

Tzvi Ilan writes that today some of the hewn stones are centralized in the center of the ruin like a platform for worship. West of the platform is a rectangular area of 20 by 30 meters appropriate for a synagogue. In the past there was a marble board with a figure of a grapevine.

== Notable people ==
- Atar Mayner (born 1992), rapper, singer-songwriter.

== See also ==
- Ammuqa
