= Tel Ro'im =

- Shown in Israel
- 33°13′34.5″N 35°34′34.6″E
- Type: Tell
- Periods: Bronze Age, Roman, Byzantine
- Location: Israel
- Region: Hula Valley, Israel

Tel Ro'im is an archaeological site in the Hula Valley, Israel.

== History ==
Tel Ro'im is located on a limestone hill, surrounded by an agricultural field, west of Highway 90, in the section between Kiryat Shmona and Metula. The site was surveyed during the survey of the Metula area between 1990 and 1996, by the Archaeological Survey of Israel and the Israel Antiquities Authority.

In the eastern slopes of the hill, there are about eight caves cut into the rock. The entrance to the caves is covered in soil and part of them had their ceiling collapse. In one of the caves there was evidence to the carving of a niche in the wall. Due to the lack of findings, it was only possible to date these caves to the Roman-Byzantine period (1st century BCE – 7th century CE). These caves were used by the farmers of Metula as temporary dwellings prior to the establishment of the courtyard in Tel Hai. The surveyors found stone mounds and some potsherds from the Middle Bronze Age period (20th – 16th century BCE) on the southern slope of the hill.

== See also ==
- Tel Barom
- Archaeology of Israel
