= Atar Mayner =

Israeli musician

Atar Mayner עטר מיינר
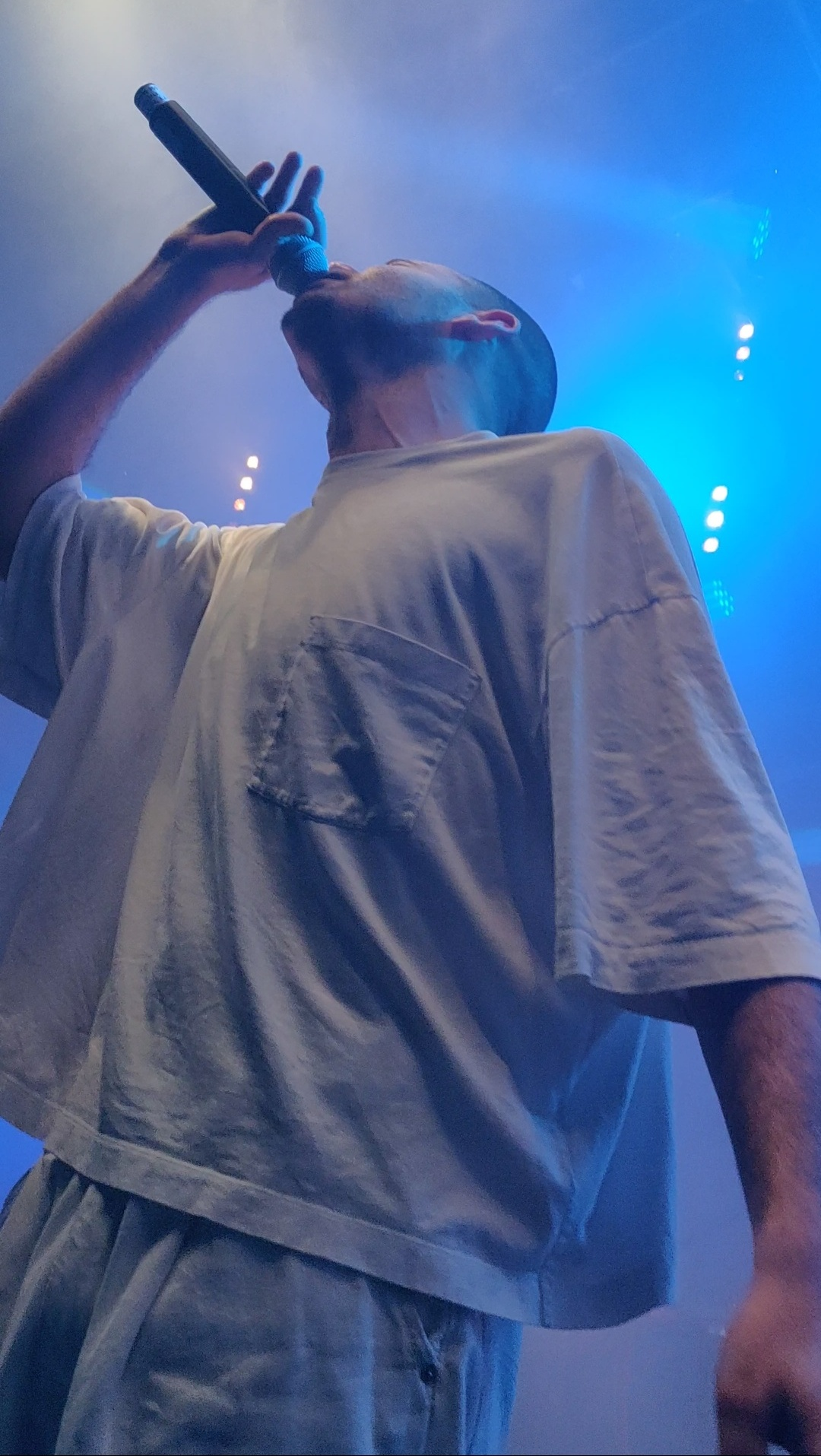
- Mayner in 2022

Background information
- Born: 29 April 1991 (age 35); Amuka, Israel
- Genre: Israeli hip hop
- Occupations: Rapper; singer; songwriter; record producer
- Years active: 2014–present
- Label: Yahalom Records

Atar Mayner (Hebrew: עטר מיינר; born 29 April 1991) is an Israeli rapper, singer and record producer.

== Biography ==
Mayner was born on 29 April 1991, the eldest son of a carpenter father and painter mother in the community settlement of Amuka. He is the brother of Hed, a fashion designer, and Shaked, the founder and director of the Chabad Yeshiva "uFaratzta." While in high school, Mayner taught himself creative writing, songwriting and music production, as well as how to play the guitar. Mayner started playing music when he was around 14 years old, learning to play guitar and drums. A few years later, with the help of music software, music production would begin. Mayner completed his mandatory service in the IDF army.

In 2014, when he was 23 years old, he independently moved to the city of Tel Aviv to focus on music creation. At that time he created his debut album, "Atar Minor", while doing odd jobs to earn a living. In 2016, Miner uploaded his first song, "24," to the video-sharing website "YouTube." Still in the same year, he produced and arranged the song "Representar" by rapper Ortega. Two years later in 2018, he published his debut album, "Atar Mayner", with the Yahlom record label. The album was praised by critics, as well as sympathetic reactions from the public. The album included the single "Medina of Thieves", which also featured Dor3 and Rasta Chai. In 2019, the single "Touch Myself" was released, but it was removed from streaming and social media platforms after Miner felt the audience misinterpreted the song lyrics. Also in the same year the song "I Have a Hole in My Heart in Your Shape" by the band "Girafat" was released, which Mayner composed and produced together with Gilad Kahane.

In 2020, together with Yuval Hambalel, he released a new version of the song "My Way". He also musically produced his sister-in-law Rif Cohen album "Quelle heure est-il" and performed a cover version of the song "One Human Tissue" with her as part of the "Order" Hour Project. On 5 November, the television series "The Cook" for which he produced the soundtrack, work for which he was nominated for the 2020 Television Academy Awards. During the year, he released the singles "Wake Up" and "Reason to Love", and At the end of the year, on 20 December, he released his second album, "Lila Tov". After the album's release, Miner was included in "Forbes" magazine 30 Under 30 list. Miner's third album, "Peneim", was released on 28 August 2022. In March 2023, he participated as a warm-up show at American rapper Travis Scott performance at Yarakon Park.

Mayner lives in Tel Aviv. On 6 January 2021, Natalie Moses, a New York-based musician, posted stories on her Instagram account accusing Mayner of physical and mental harm and infringing on Mayner's copyright to the song "New in Town". Mayner denied the claims. In light of the claims, Mayner's appearance at the Indingev Festival in 2022 was cancelled.

== Discography ==
=== Album ===
- 2018: עטר מיינר
- 2020: לילה טוב
- 2022: לפנים

== See also ==
- Israeli hip hop
- Music of Israel
- Jonathan Mergui
