= Dishon Stream =

Intermittent stream in Galilee, Israel

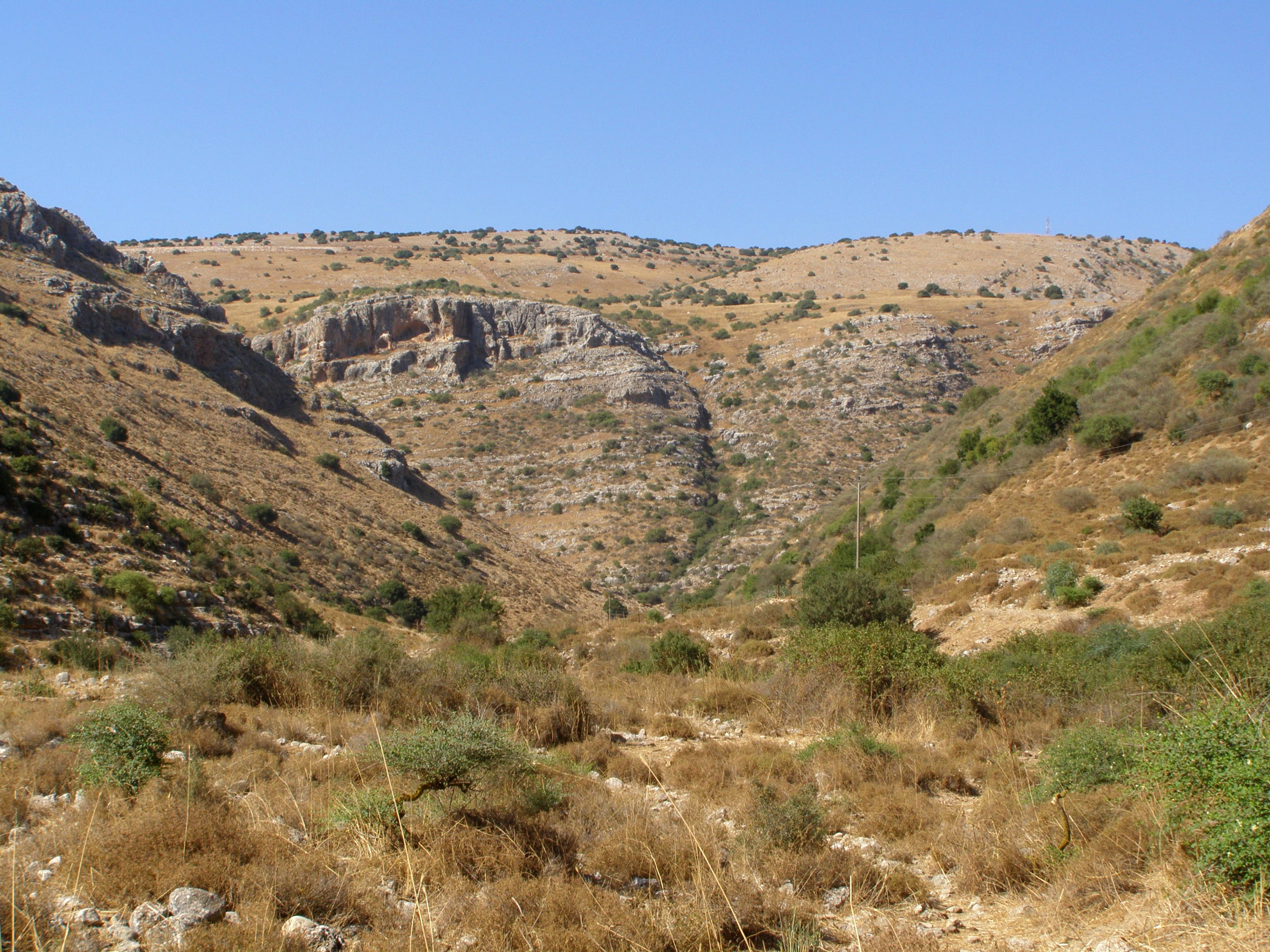

Location
- State: Israel
- Region: Upper Galilee

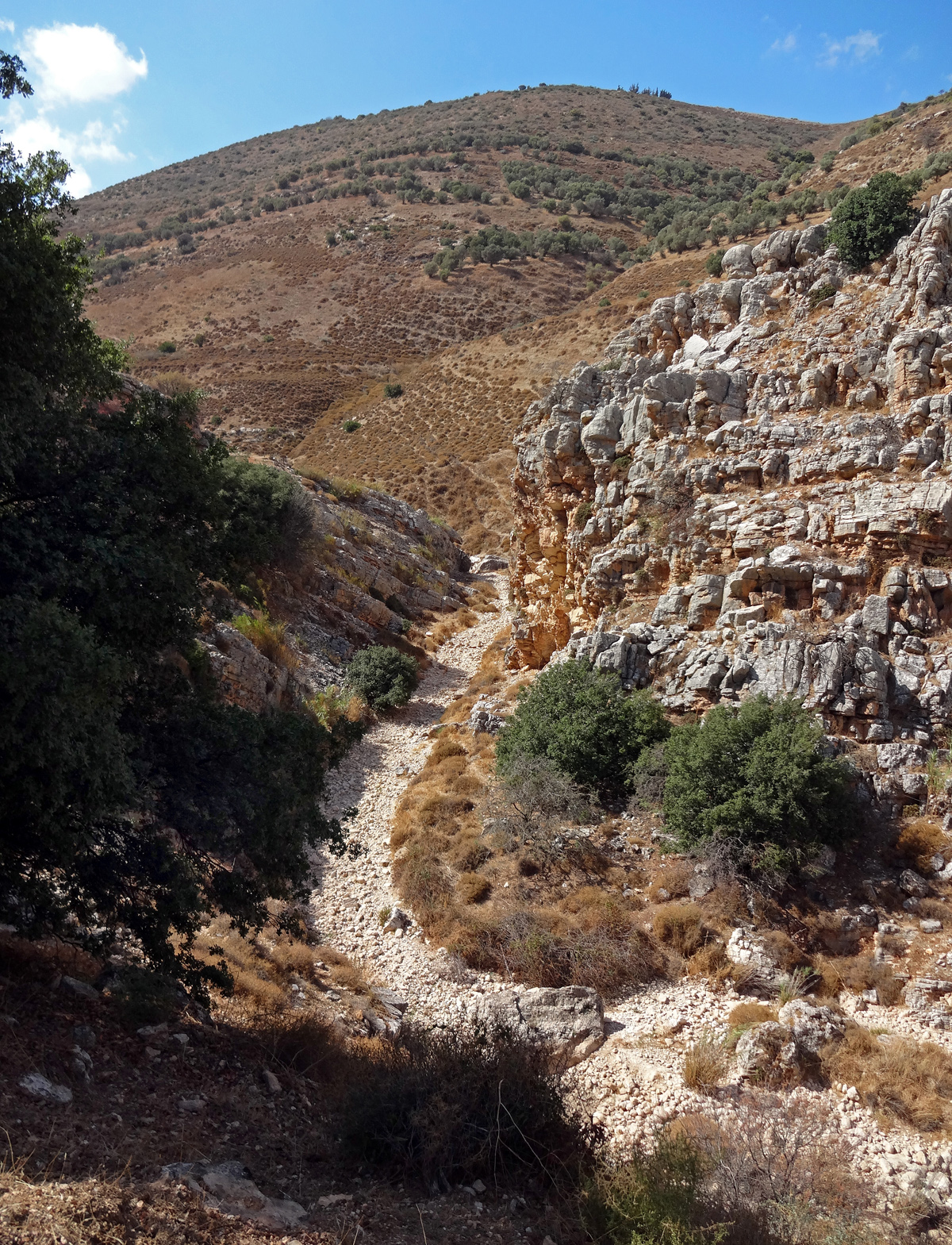
Nahal Dishon

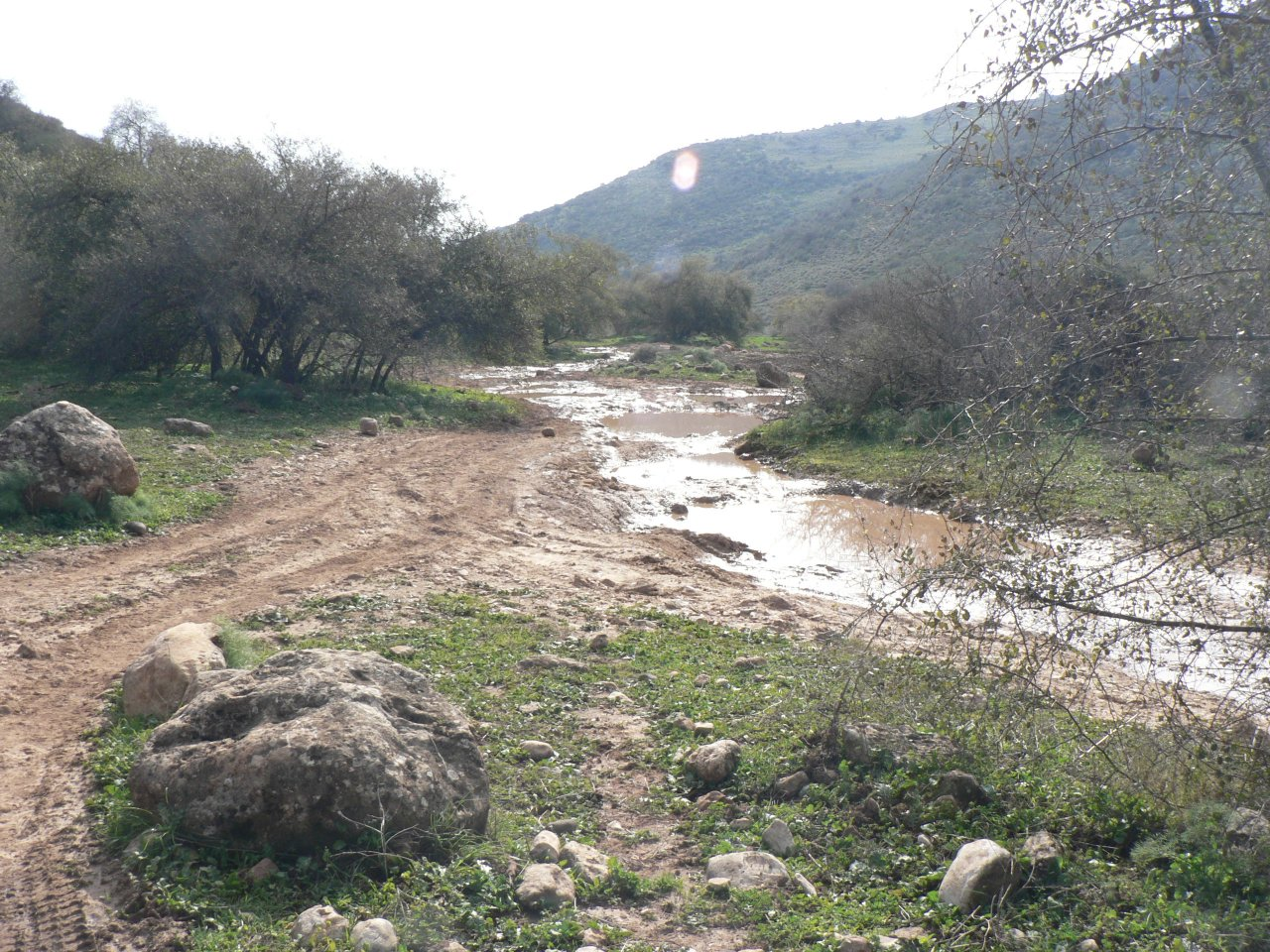
Wet Nahal Dishon

The Dishon Stream (Hebrew: נחל דישון, Nahal Dishon) is an intermittent stream/wadi in Upper Galilee, Israel. It is 26 kilometers long, starts on the eastern slope of Mount Meron and drains into the Jordan River in the area of the drained Hula Lake. It is one of the largest streams in East Upper Galilee. Its name is a modification of the name of the depopulated Palestinian village of Dayshum.

mindat.org reports the following Arabic names associated with the stream: Wadi 'Uba (Ouadi Ouba), Wadi Fara, Wādi Hindāj, Wadi Nab' el Balat, and Wadi Nasir.

Parts of the Israel National Trail run through the Dishon valley. Parts of the stream are in the Nahal Dishon Reserve (the central part of the stream) and the Bar'am Forest Reserve (parts of the slopes of the valley).

Major tributaries: Nahal Aviv, Nahal Gush Halav, Nahal Tziv'on.

Route 886 runs along the Dishon Stream for the whole length of the Dishon Stream Reserve. It used to be marked for SUV access, which was prohibited in the stream area in 2013.

== See also ==
- List of rivers of Israel
