= Dayshum =

Dayshum ديشوم Dayshum, Deishum
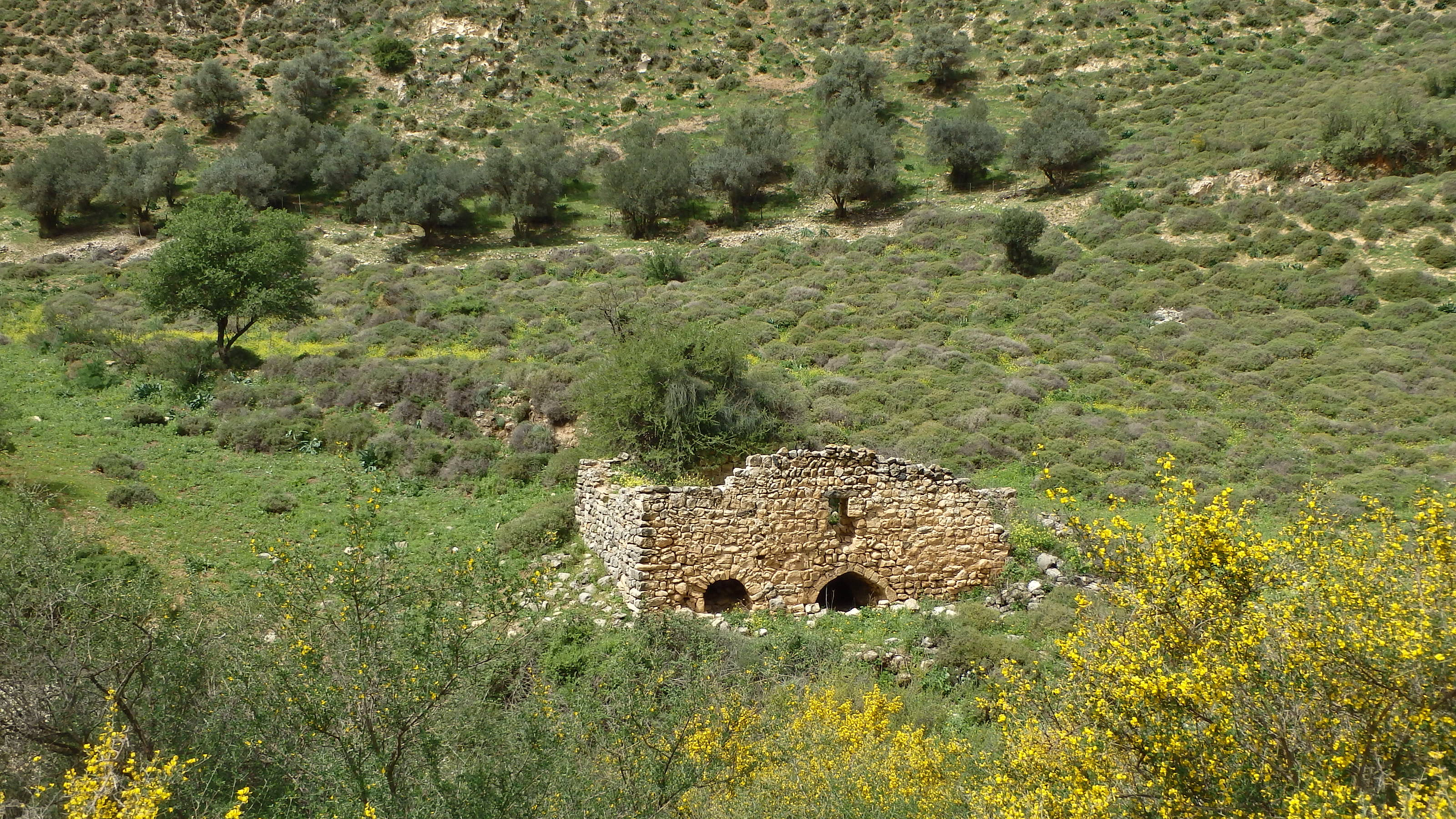
- Ruins of Dayshum
- Etymology: personal name
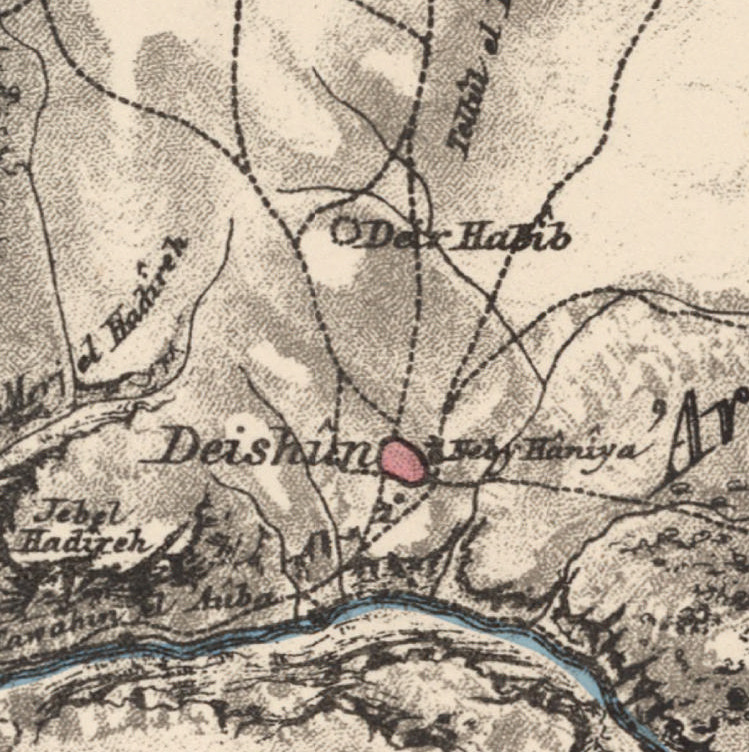
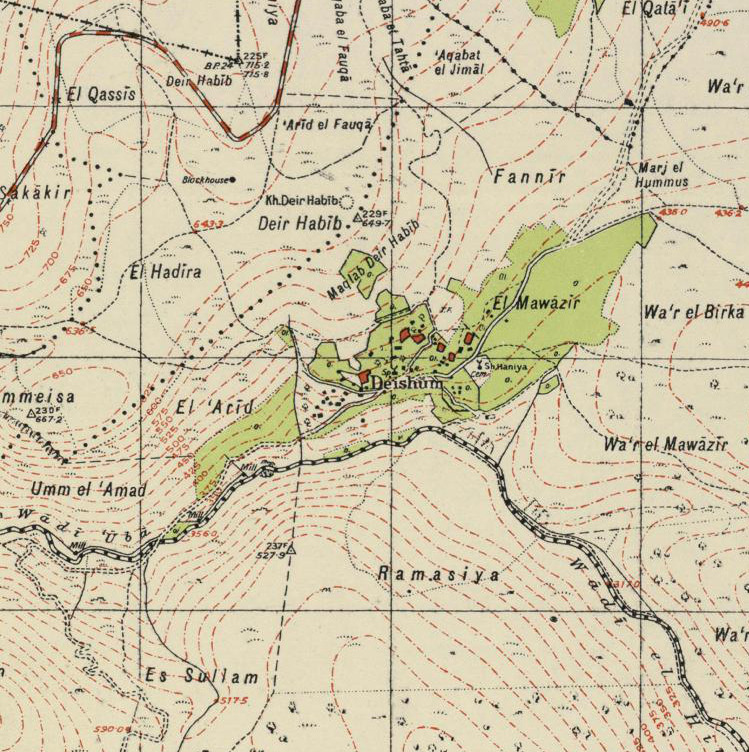
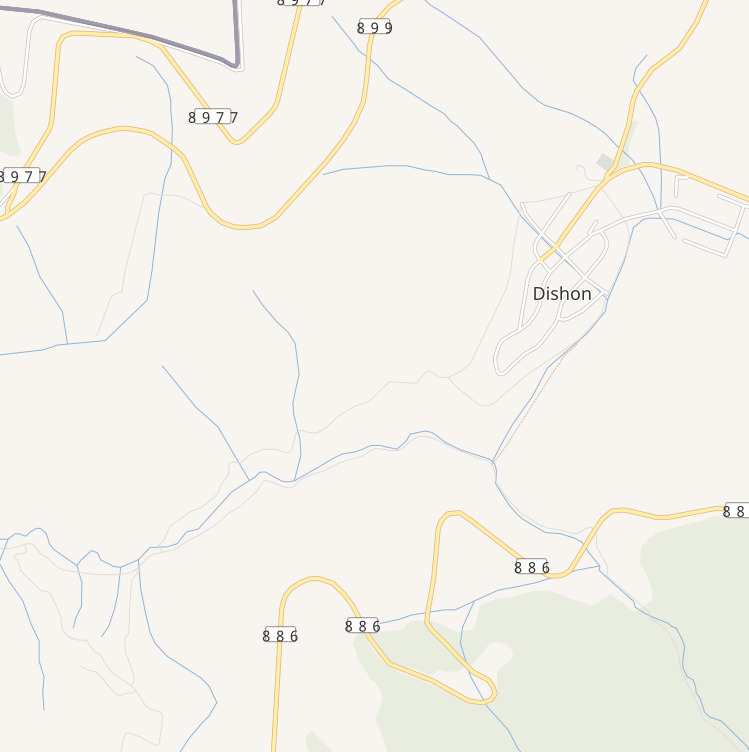
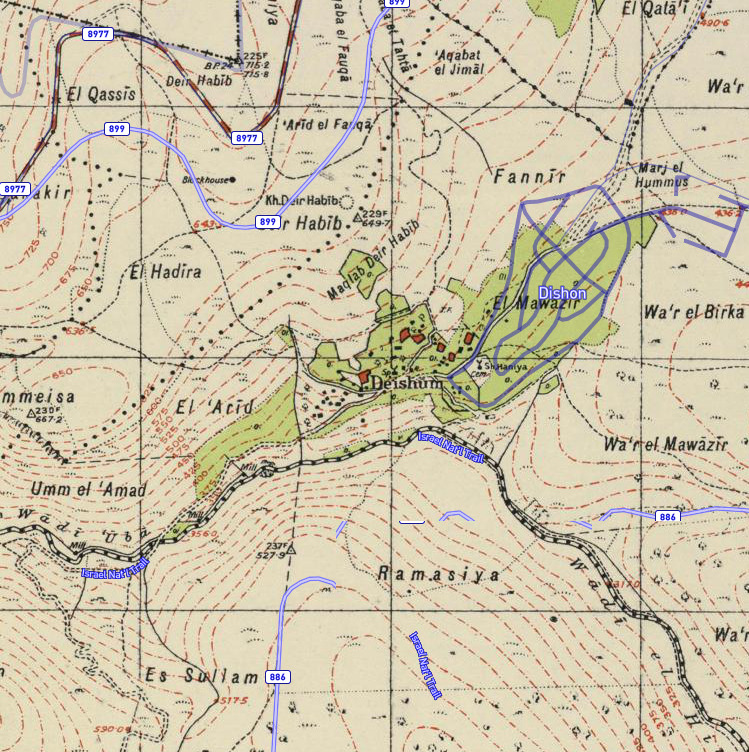
- 1870s map 1940s map modern map 1940s with modern overlay map A series of historical maps of the area around Dayshum (click the buttons)

- Location within Mandatory Palestine
- Coordinates: 33°04′42″N 35°30′34″E
- Palestine grid: 197/276
- Geopolitical entity: Mandatory Palestine
- Subdistrict: Safad
- Date of depopulation: 30 October 1948

Area
  - Total: 23,044 dunams (23.044 km^{2}; 8.897 sq mi)

Population (1945)
  - Total: 590
- Cause(s) of depopulation: Military assault by Yishuv forces
- Current Localities: Dishon

Dayshum (Arabic: ديشوم, romanized: Dayshūm), also known by its variant name Dayshun was a Palestinian village, depopulated on 30 October 1948 by the Sheva Brigade of Israeli paramilitary force Palmach in an offensive called Operation Hiram, where the village has been destroyed, and only house rubble left behind.

== Geography ==
The village laid on a hillside overlooking the Wadi Hindaj stream and valley in the Upper Galilee, about 600 meters (2,000 ft) above sea level. It was located 12 kilometers (7.5 mi) north of Safed.

== History ==
Dayshum was listed in the 1596 (or 1548) Ottoman tax registers as a village in the nahiya (subdistrict) of Jira (part of Safad Sanjak), with a population of 50, all Muslim. They paid a fixed tax rate of 25% on a number of crops, including wheat, barley, olives, and fruits, as well as on other types of produce and property, such as goats, beehives, and a press that was used for processing either olives or grapes; a total of 2,112 akçe. All of the revenue went to a waqf (Muslim charitable endowment).

Dayshum was settled by Algerian immigrants, one of several vacant or underdeveloped villages settled by Algerians in the environs of Safed under the auspices of the Ottoman authorities in the late 19th century. The historian Moshe Sharon suggests Dayshum was not settled by the Algerians until after 1875, as the village was not mentioned by the traveler Victor Guérin, who noted other Algerian villages in the vicinity that year. The village was exclusively populated by Algerians. They hailed from the Ayet Yihya tribe from Tigzirt. As some of their ancestors had been horsemen in Algeria, the villagers of Dayshum took a keen interest in raising horses.

In 1881 the PEF's Survey of Western Palestine described Dayshum as a "well-built" village with about 400 residents, all Algerians. The village houses were situated on the side of a steep hill near the bottom of a valley and had gabled roofs. The village had three mills and several small gardens.

=== British Mandate ===
In 1921 inspectors from the British Mandatory Department noted a maqam (holy person's shrine) northeast of the village site, dedicated to a Sheikh Haniyya. In the 1922 census of Palestine conducted by the British Mandate authorities, Dayshum had a population of 479, all Muslim, decreasing slightly in the 1931 census of Palestine to 438, still all Muslim, in 102 inhabited houses.

By 1942 or 1943, the village had a primary school. Dayshum was also home to a prominent imam in the Safed region at that time, Sheikh Mohammad al-Wannas. In the 1945 statistics the population consisted of 590 Muslims, with a total of 23,044 dunams of land. Of this, a total 4,701 dunums of village land was used for cereals and 611 dunums were irrigated or used for orchards, while 17,093 dunams were classified as non-cultivable area.

=== Post 1948 ===
In 1953, the Jewish community of Dishon was established on village land. Its name is a reflection of the village's Arabic name.

In 1992, the village site was described: "Cactuses and thorns grow on the site. The only indications of the former existence of Dayshum are piles of stones from the destroyed houses and terraces. Moshav Dishon uses the land around the site for animal grazing and apple cultivation."

== See also ==
- Depopulated Palestinian locations in Israel
- Killings and massacres during the 1948 Palestine War

== Bibliography ==
- Abbasi, Mustafa (2003). "From Algeria to the Holy Land: Algerian Communities in the Galilee, from the Late Ottoman Period to 1948". The Maghreb Review: 41–59.
- Barron, J. B., ed. (1923). Palestine: Report and General Abstracts of the Census of 1922. Government of Palestine.
- Conder, C.R.; Kitchener, H. H. (1881). The Survey of Western Palestine: Memoirs of the Topography, Orography, Hydrography, and Archaeology. Vol. 1. London: Committee of the Palestine Exploration Fund.
- Department of Statistics (1945). Village Statistics, April, 1945. Government of Palestine.
- Hadawi, S. (1970). Village Statistics of 1945: A Classification of Land and Area ownership in Palestine. Palestine Liberation Organization Research Center.
- Hütteroth, W.-D.; Abdulfattah, K. (1977). Historical Geography of Palestine, Transjordan and Southern Syria in the Late 16th Century. Erlanger Geographische Arbeiten, Sonderband 5. Erlangen, Germany: Vorstand der Fränkischen Geographischen Gesellschaft. ISBN 3-920405-41-2.
- Khalidi, W. (1992). All That Remains:The Palestinian Villages Occupied and Depopulated by Israel in 1948. Washington D.C.: Institute for Palestine Studies. ISBN 0-88728-224-5.
- Mills, E., ed. (1932). Census of Palestine 1931. Population of Villages, Towns and Administrative Areas. Jerusalem: Government of Palestine.
- Morris, B. (2004). The Birth of the Palestinian Refugee Problem Revisited. Cambridge University Press. ISBN 978-0-521-00967-6.
- Palmer, E. H. (1881). The Survey of Western Palestine: Arabic and English Name Lists Collected During the Survey by Lieutenants Conder and Kitchener, R. E. Transliterated and Explained by E.H. Palmer. Committee of the Palestine Exploration Fund.
- Sharon, M. (2004). Corpus Inscriptionum Arabicarum Palaestinae, D-F. Vol. 3. BRILL. ISBN 90-04-13197-3.
