= Al-Zanghariyya =

Al-Zanghariyya زُحلق/الزنغرية Zanghariya
- Village
- Etymology: Arab ez Zengharîyeh, the Zengharîyeh Arabs, p.n.
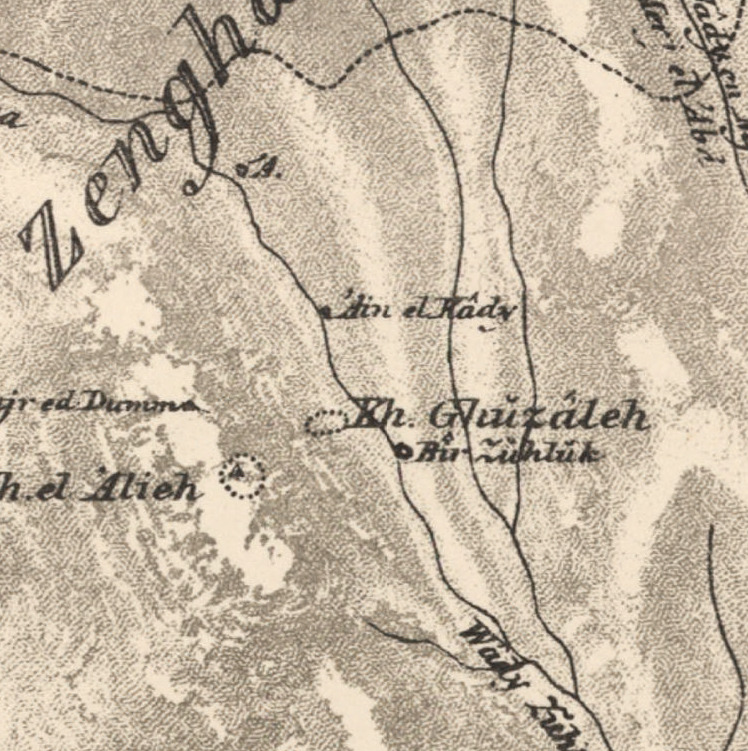
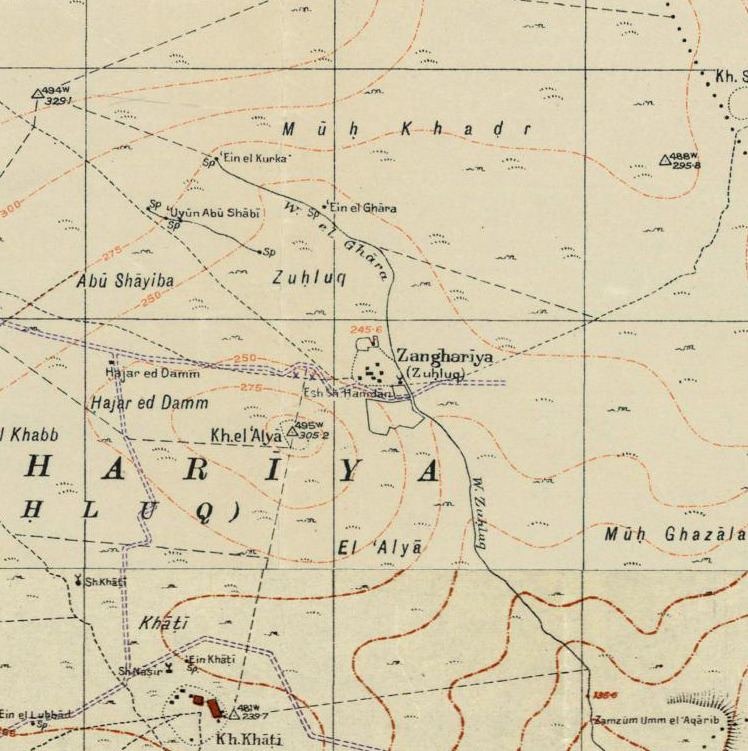
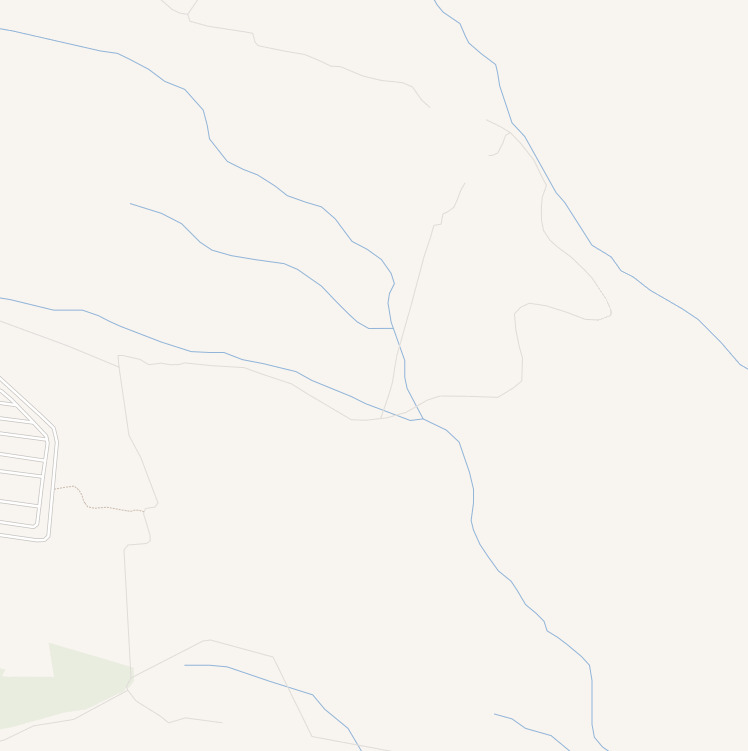
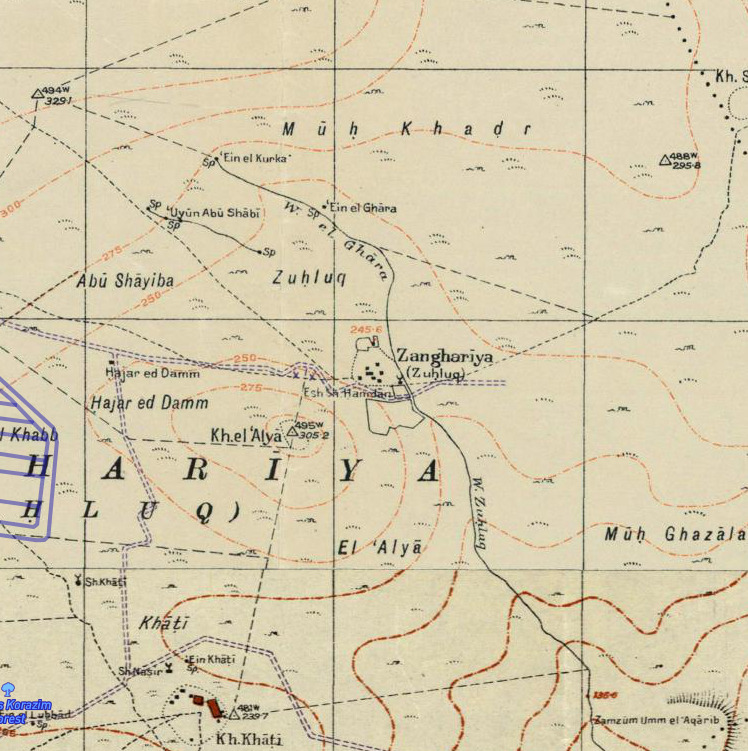
- 1870s map 1940s map modern map 1940s with modern overlay map A series of historical maps of the area around Al-Zanghariyya (click the buttons)

- Location within Mandatory Palestine
- Coordinates: 32°56′29″N 35°35′10″E
- Palestine grid: 205/260
- Geopolitical entity: Mandatory Palestine
- Subdistrict: Safad
- Date of depopulation: May 4, 1948

Area
  - Total: 27,918 dunams (27.918 km^{2}; 10.779 sq mi)

Population (1945)
  - Total: 840
- Cause(s) of depopulation: Military assault by Yishuv forces
- Secondary cause: Expulsion by Yishuv forces
- Current Localities: Elifelet

Al-Zanghariyya was a Palestinian Arab village in the Safad Subdistrict. It was depopulated during the 1947–1948 Civil War in Mandatory Palestine on May 4, 1948, under Operation Matateh. It was located 8.5 km southeast of Safad, near Wadi al-Ghara. The village was later burned and destroyed on June 17, 1948.

== History ==
The village was named after the Arab al-Zanghariyya Bedouin tribe, who settled the area.

In 1838, in the Ottoman era, ez-Zenghariyeh was noted as an Arab tribe, within the Government of Safad.

=== British Mandate era ===
In the 1922 census of Palestine conducted by the British Mandate authorities, Zangharia had a population of 374 Muslims, increasing in the 1931 census to 526 Muslims, in a total of 97 houses.

In the 1945 statistics, the village had a total population of 840 Muslims with a total of 27,918 dunams of land, according to an official land and population survey. Of this, 7,265 dunums were for cereals; while a total of 20,653 dunams was classified as uncultivable.

=== 1948, aftermath ===
Al-Zanghariyya became depopulated on May 4, 1948, during Operation Matate (lit. "Operation Broom"). On May 5, 1948, the Haganah "blew up most of the houses and burned the tents of Kedar’ between Tabigha and the Buteiha, where the Jordan enters the sea; some 15 Arabs were killed and the rest fled to Syria."

On May 5, 1948, Palmah sappers methodically blew up more than 50 houses in Zanghariya and other villages in the area.

A Catholic priest, in Tabigha noted: "When I just finished blessing the bread there was a terrible explosion in Tabigha. We rushed out and saw pillars of smoke rising skyward. House after house was bombed and torched, then matters proceeded toward the Jordan. All was bombed, the tents and the huts were burned. All day there were explosions, and smoke and fire were visible; in the evening the ‘victors’ returned with trucks loaded with cattle. What they couldn't take they shot . . . The mother of Big Awad and Old Dahan were killed." Some the Zanghariya villagers later returned and were expelled again, apparently in 1949 or early 1950s.

In 1949 the moshav settlement of Elifelet, was established west of the village site on village land. The private farm of Kare Deshe, established in 1954, also lie on the former village grounds.

In 1992 the village site was described: "All that is left are blocks of basalt that once had been parts of twelve houses. Although the houses have been demolished, some of their walls are still standing. Near the remnants of the village houses are stone barriers that form parts of livestock enclosures. The area serves as pasture for the cattle of the nearby Israeli farm, Kare Deshe, to the southwest."

Two books have been published about the village, one in 1999, and one in 2002. In one of them, recalling the history of resistance between 1948 and 2000, the last name of almost all of the 35 men (killed, imprisoned, fighters, and so on) is al-Zanghari, the Nisba of the village.

== See also ==
Former and current villages inhabited by the Zanghariyya Bedouin tribe:

- Khirbat Karraza (Chorazin)
- Tuba-Zangariyye

== Bibliography ==
- Al-Jam‘an, Muqbil (1999). Al-Zanghariyya: Ard wa 'ashira [Al-Zanghariyya: Land and tribe]. Damascus, Syria: Dar al-Shajara.
- Al-Zanghari, Khamis al-Jaradat (2002). Al-Judhur al-tarikhiyya lil-Zanghariyya [The historical roots of al-Zanghariyya]. Damascus, Syria: Dar al-Shajara.
- Barron, J. B., ed. (1923). Palestine: Report and General Abstracts of the Census of 1922. Government of Palestine.
- Davis, Rochelle A. (2011). Palestinian Village Histories: Geographies of the Displaced. Stanford University Press, Stanford, California. ISBN 978-0-8047-7312-6.
- Department of Statistics (1945). Village Statistics, April, 1945. Government of Palestine.
- Hadawi, S. (1970). Village Statistics of 1945: A Classification of Land and Area ownership in Palestine. Palestine Liberation Organization Research Center. Archived from the original on 2018-12-08.
- Khalidi, W. (1992). All That Remains: The Palestinian Villages Occupied and Depopulated by Israel in 1948. Washington D.C.: Institute for Palestine Studies. ISBN 0-88728-224-5.
- Mills, E., ed. (1932). Census of Palestine 1931. Population of Villages, Towns and Administrative Areas. Jerusalem: Government of Palestine.
- Morris, B. (2004). The Birth of the Palestinian Refugee Problem Revisited. Cambridge University Press. ISBN 978-0-521-00967-6.
- Palmer, E.H. (1881). The Survey of Western Palestine: Arabic and English Name Lists Collected During the Survey by Lieutenants Conder and Kitchener, R. E. Transliterated and Explained by E.H. Palmer. Committee of the Palestine Exploration Fund.
- Robinson, E.; Smith, E. (1841). Biblical Researches in Palestine, Mount Sinai and Arabia Petraea: A Journal of Travels in the year 1838. Vol. 3. Boston: Crocker & Brewster.
