= Operation Matateh =

Haganah offensive operation

Operation Matateh (Hebrew: מבצע מטאטא, Mivtza Matateh, lit. Operation Broom) was a Haganah offensive launched ten days before the end of the British Mandate in Palestine. It was a sub-section of Operation Yiftach, with the objectives of capturing the flatlands between Lake Tiberias and Lake Hula and clear the area of Bedouin encampments. It was carried out by Palmach units under the command of Yigal Allon.

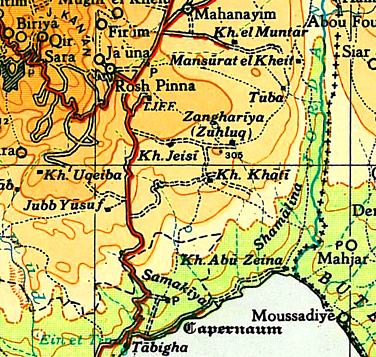
1944 map showing three of the Bedouin areas cleared during Operation Matateh (Samakiya, Shananlina and Zanghariyya).

== Background ==
The 1942 edition of Steimatzky's "Palestine Guide" describes Hula district as follows:

"The road passes through several small Arab settlements. All round are Bedouin encampments with mat tents. The Bedouin gather reeds that grow in the marshes and weave them into mats. These are sold in the markets, and form an important source of their income. You can see the people weaving beside their tents. They also breed buffalies(sic) which can be seen basking in the swamps near the springs. This part of the country is rich in this type of cattle."

In a report to Haganah General Staff, dated 22 April 1948, Allon recommended: "an attempt to clear the beduins encamped between the Jordan, and Jubb Yusuf and the Sea of Galilee". The area was home to five Bedouin clans: al-Qudayriyya, 'Arab as Samakiya, 'Arab as Suyyad, Arab al-Shamalina and the al-Zanghariyya. These had for months harassed Jewish traffic on the Tiberias - Rosh-Pina road.

== Operation ==
The Operational orders were:

1. The destruction of bases of the enemy, who sabotages and harasses our traffic in the Galilee
2. To destroy points of assembly for invading forces from east
3. To join the lower and upper Galilee with a relatively wide and safe strip.

The company commanders who attacked the villages of Zanghariya and Tabigha and the area of 'Arab ash Shamalina' also had orders that "their inhabitants [be] expelled and houses blown up", though friendly Arabs and churches "should on no account be harmed." The attack was launched on 4 May 1948. The assault on Zanghariya was preceded by mortaring and the Arabs fled eastward into Syria. The following day Palmach sappers 'methodically blew up more than 50 houses' in the area.

The Yiftah Logbook records on 4 May that: "The operation is going according to plan and at 9.00 o'clock (a.m.?) the units reached their objectives as, on the way, they blow up all the houses and burn all the bedouin tents."

== Aftermath ==
A cable to the British Foreign Office, dated 4 May, quoted Syrian sources that 2,000 refugees had crossed the border. According to Yigal Allon, Operation Broom had a "tremendous psychological impact" on the population of Safed and of the Hula Valley to the north.

== Communities captured during Operation Matateh ==
Population figures based on year-end 1944 figures from the Village Statistics 1945 - Palestine Index Gazetteer.

Name	Date	Defending forces	Brigade	Population
Arab al-Shamalina	4 May 1948	villagers fled	Palmach	650
Al-Butayha	4 May 1948	villagers fled	Palmach	650
Al-Qudayriyya	4 May 1948	Arab Liberation Army; 2nd Yarmuk Battalion	Palmach	390
Al-Zanghariyya	4 May 1948	n/a	Palmach	840

== See also ==
- Depopulated Palestinian locations in Israel

== Bibliography ==
- Khalidi, Walid (1992). All That Remains: The Palestinian Villages Occupied and Depopulated by Israel in 1948. Washington D.C.: Institute for Palestine Studies. ISBN 0-88728-224-5.
- Morris, Benny, (1987) The Birth of the Palestinian refugee problem, 1947–1949, ISBN 0-521-33028-9.
- Morris, Benny (2004). The Birth of the Palestinian Refugee Problem Revisited. Cambridge University Press. ISBN 978-0-521-00967-6.
