= Arab al-Shamalina =

Arab al-Shamalina عرب الشمالنة
- Etymology: Kh. Abu Zeineh, the ruin of Abu Zeineh, p.n.
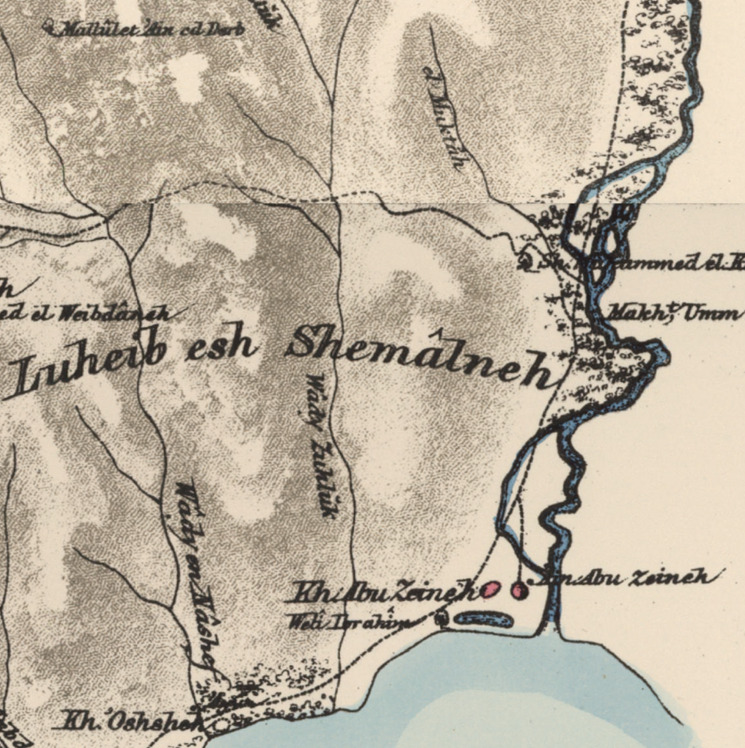
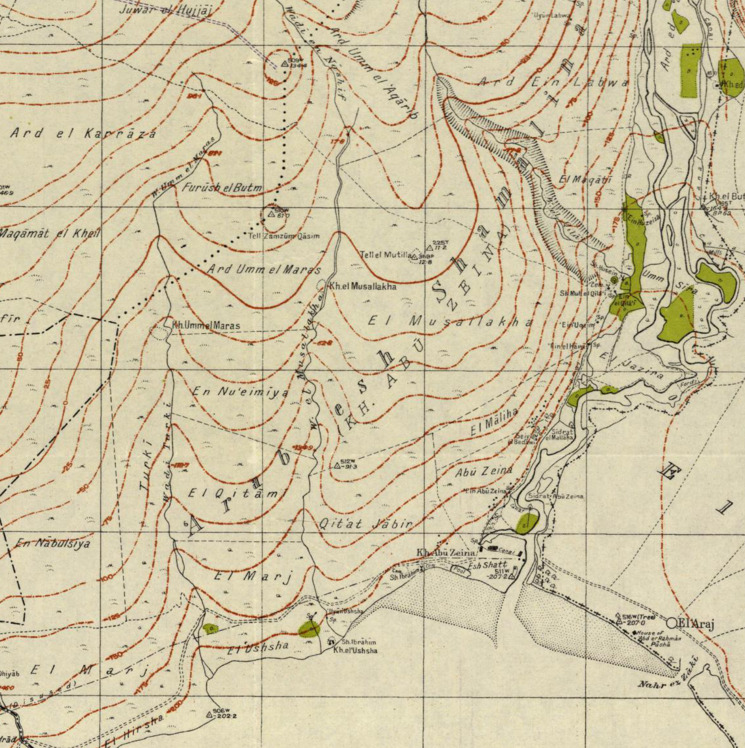
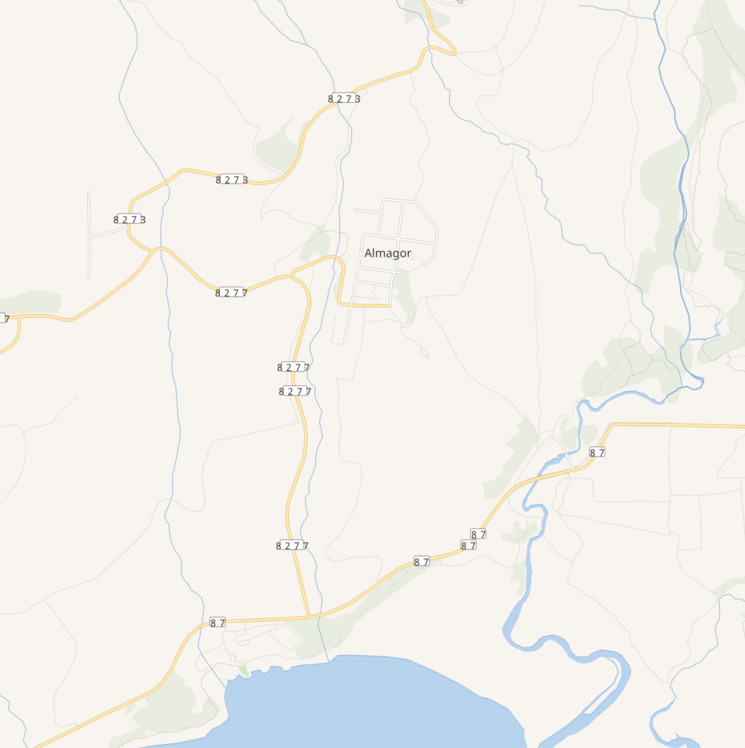
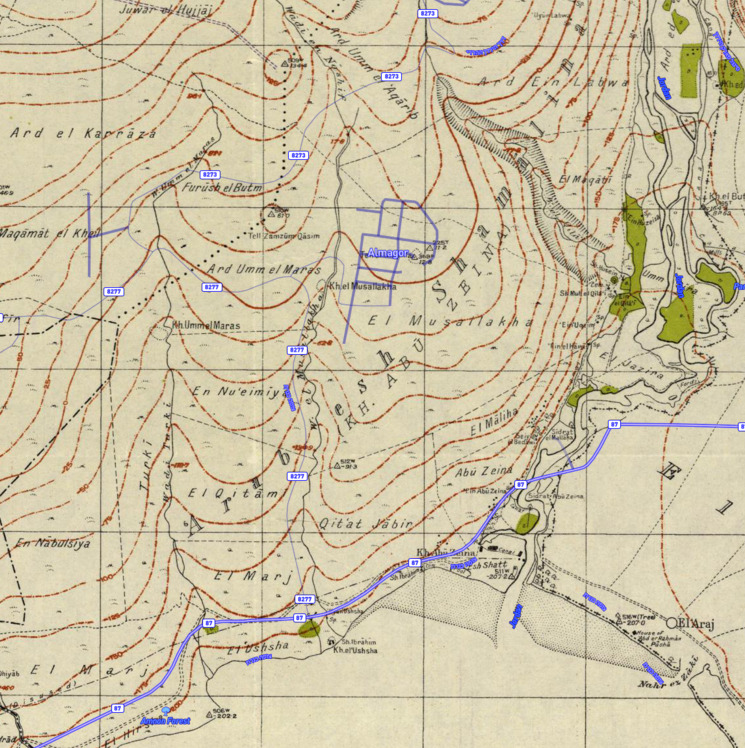
- 1870s map 1940s map modern map 1940s with modern overlay map A series of historical maps of the area around Arab al-Shamalina (click the buttons)

- Location within Mandatory Palestine
- Coordinates: 32°54′26″N 35°36′08″E
- Palestine grid: 205/256
- Geopolitical entity: Mandatory Palestine
- Subdistrict: Safad
- Date of depopulation: May 4, 1948

Population (1945)
  - Total: 650
- Cause(s) of depopulation: Military assault by Yishuv forces
- Secondary cause: Expulsion by Yishuv forces
- Current Localities: Almagor

Arab al-Shamalina (Arabic: عرب الشمالنة) also known as Khirbat Abu Zayna was a Palestinian Arab village in the Safad Subdistrict. It was depopulated during the 1947–1948 Civil War in Mandatory Palestine on May 4, 1948, under Operation Matate (Broom), a sub operation of Operation Yiftach. It was located 13 km southeast of Safad near the Jordan River.

In 1945 it had a population of 650.

== History ==
The village was located north of Lake Tiberias, west of the Jordan River. The villagers were members of the ‘Arab al-Shamalina Bedouin tribe and several archaeological sites have been found in the vicinity.

In 1875, Victor Guérin found here the foundations of a building with walls one metre in thickness.

In 1881, the PEF's Survey of Western Palestine (SWP) noted: "Modern Arab granaries and slight traces of modern ruined houses" at Kh. Abu Zeineh, or Shunet esh Shemalneh.

=== British Mandate era ===
In the 1922 census of Palestine, conducted by the British Mandate authorities, Shamalneh had a population of 278, all Muslims, increasing in the 1931 census to 551; 1 Christian and 555 Muslims, in a total of 108 houses.

In the 1944/45 statistic the village was counted with Al-Butayha, and together they had a total 16,690 dunums of land. Of this, 3,842 dunums was allocated to cereals, 238 dunums were irrigated or used for orchards, while 12,610 dunams were classified as non-cultivable land. Several springs in the area provided water.

=== 1948 war and depopulation ===
Under Operation Matateh (lit. Operation Broom), a sub operation of Operation Yiftach, the village, along with others between Lake al-Hula and Lake Tiberias was depopulated by Israeli forces on 4 May 1948. Israeli historian Benny Morris has documented that the troops were given specific orders to attack the village and destroy it. The attack commenced with Palmach troops bombarding the area, causing the villagers to flee.

The settlement of Almagor was established 2 km northwest of the village site in 1961.

In 1992 the village site was described: "The site, which is mostly covered with thorny grass, is strewn with the rubble of houses. Eucalyptus and palm trees also grow on the site. Most of the surrounding land is used as pasture, although some of it is cultivated."

== Bibliography ==
- Barron, J. B., ed. (1923). Palestine: Report and General Abstracts of the Census of 1922. Government of Palestine.
- Conder, C.R.; Kitchener, H.H. (1881). The Survey of Western Palestine: Memoirs of the Topography, Orography, Hydrography, and Archaeology. Vol. 1. London: Committee of the Palestine Exploration Fund.
- Department of Statistics (1945). Village Statistics, April, 1945. Government of Palestine.
- Guérin, V. (1880). Description Géographique Historique et Archéologique de la Palestine (in French). Vol. 3: Galilee, pt. 1. Paris: L'Imprimerie Nationale.
- Hadawi, S. (1970). Village Statistics of 1945: A Classification of Land and Area ownership in Palestine. Palestine Liberation Organization Research Center.
- Khalidi, W. (1992). All That Remains: The Palestinian Villages Occupied and Depopulated by Israel in 1948. Washington D.C.: Institute for Palestine Studies. ISBN 0-88728-224-5.
- Mills, E., ed. (1932). Census of Palestine 1931. Population of Villages, Towns and Administrative Areas. Jerusalem: Government of Palestine.
- Morris, B. (2004). The Birth of the Palestinian Refugee Problem Revisited. Cambridge University Press. ISBN 978-0-521-00967-6.
- Palmer, E.H. (1881). The Survey of Western Palestine: Arabic and English Name Lists Collected During the Survey by Lieutenants Conder and Kitchener, R. E. Transliterated and Explained by E.H. Palmer. Committee of the Palestine Exploration Fund.
