= Almagor =

Moshav in northern Israel

Almagor: אַלְמָגוֹר (Hebrew)
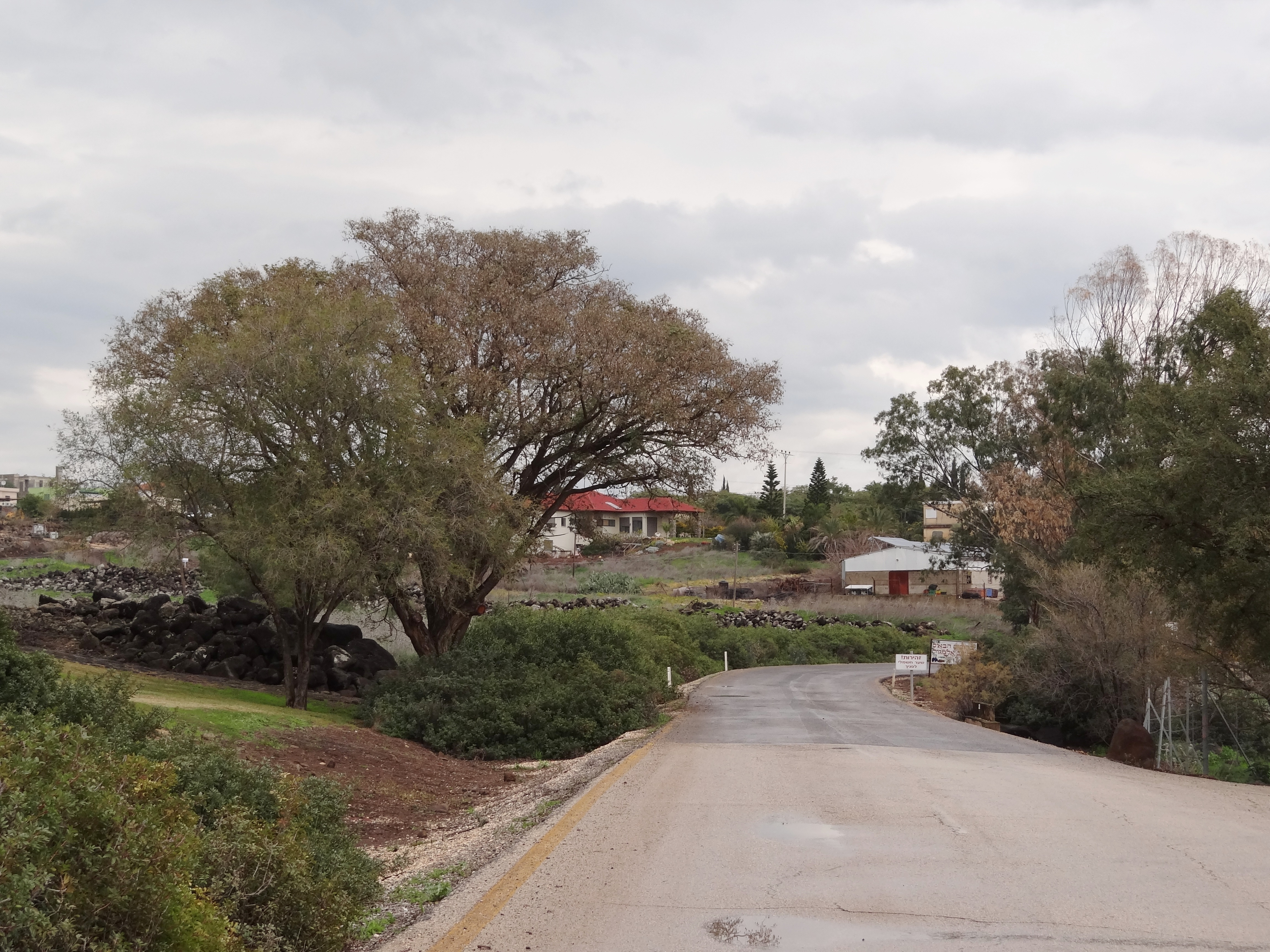

- Location within Northeast Israel Location within Israel
- Coordinates: 32°54′45″N 35°36′7.56″E
- Country: Israel
- District: Northern
- Subdistrict: Kinneret
- Council: Emek HaYarden
- Affiliation: Moshavim Movement
- Founded: 1961
- Founder: Nahal
- Population (2024): 540

Almagor (Hebrew: אַלְמָגוֹר) is a moshav in northern Israel. Located in the Korazim Plateau, to the north of the Sea of Galilee, it falls under the jurisdiction of Emek HaYarden Regional Council. In 2024 it had a population of 540.

== History ==
The village was established in 1961 as a Nahal settlement and was built on land located near the depopulated Palestinian villages of Al-Butayha and Arab al-Shamalina. The village was converted to a civilian settlement in 1965.

The area had been the site for the Battle of Tel Motila, a clash between Israel and Syria on 2 May 1951. Today a memorial stands at the site.
