= Amnun =

Amnun: אַמְנוּן (Hebrew)
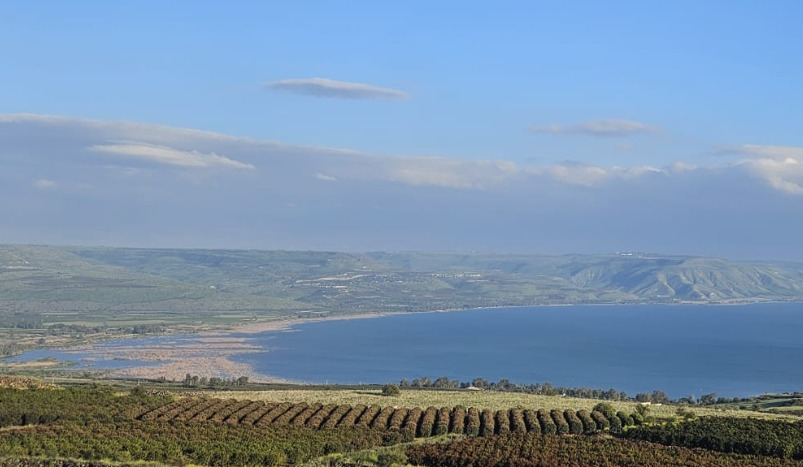
- View from Amnun
- Etymology: Hebrew for Galilean comb, a local Tilapia fish
- Location within Northeast Israel
- Coordinates: 32°54′16″N 35°34′15″E
- Country: Israel
- District: Northern
- Subdistrict: Safed
- Council: Mevo'ot HaHermon
- Region: Upper Galilee
- Founded: 1983
- Founder: Evacuees from Sinai
- Population (2024): 526

Amnun (Hebrew: אַמְנוּן) is a workers' moshav in the Upper Galilee in northern Israel. Located on the Korazim Plateau, it belongs to the Mevo'ot HaHermon Regional Council and HaOved HaTzioni, a part of Hanoar Hatzioni. It is located in the Korazim region, north of Kfar Nahum and the Sea of Galilee and east of Safed. In 2024 it had a population of 526.

== History ==
The moshav was founded by the Jewish Agency in 1983 for evacuees of former Israeli settlements in Sinai after the signing of the Egypt–Israel peace treaty and residents of neighboring moshavim.

The name is based on the Tilapia fish, called "Amnun" in Hebrew, which lives in the nearby Kinneret lake (see Galilean comb).

It was founded on the land of the depopulated Palestinian village of Al-Samakiyya.
