= Al-Qudayriyya =

Al-Qudayriyya القديرية Qudeiriya, al-
- Village
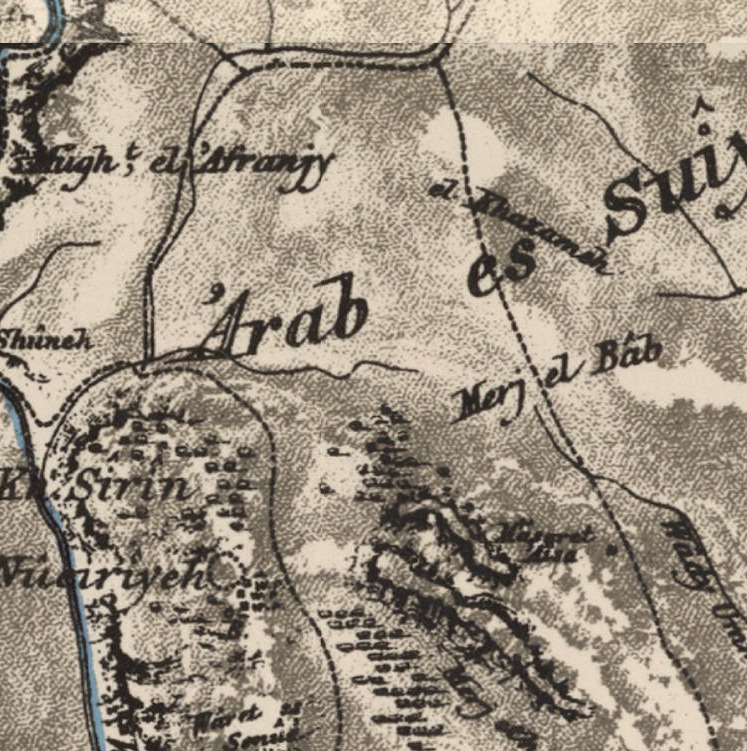
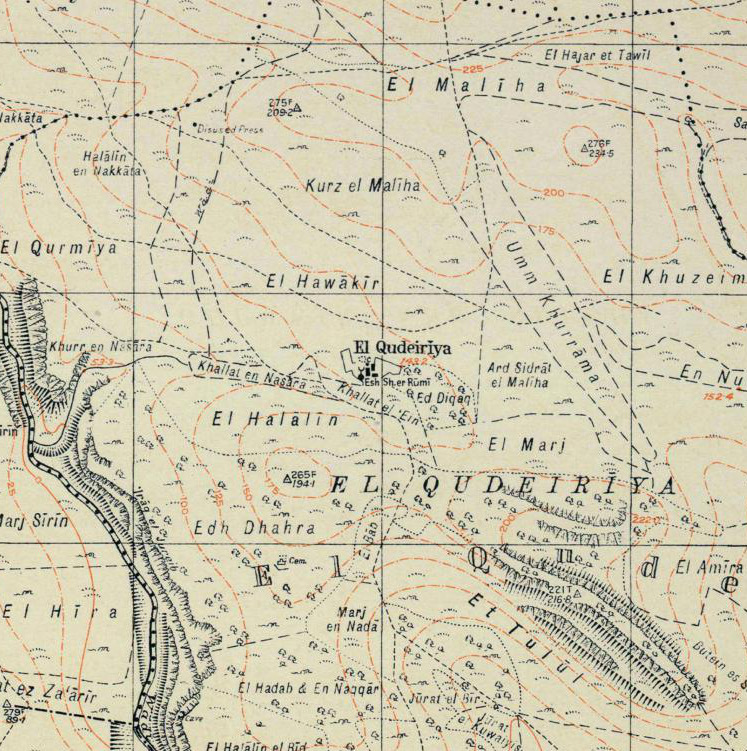
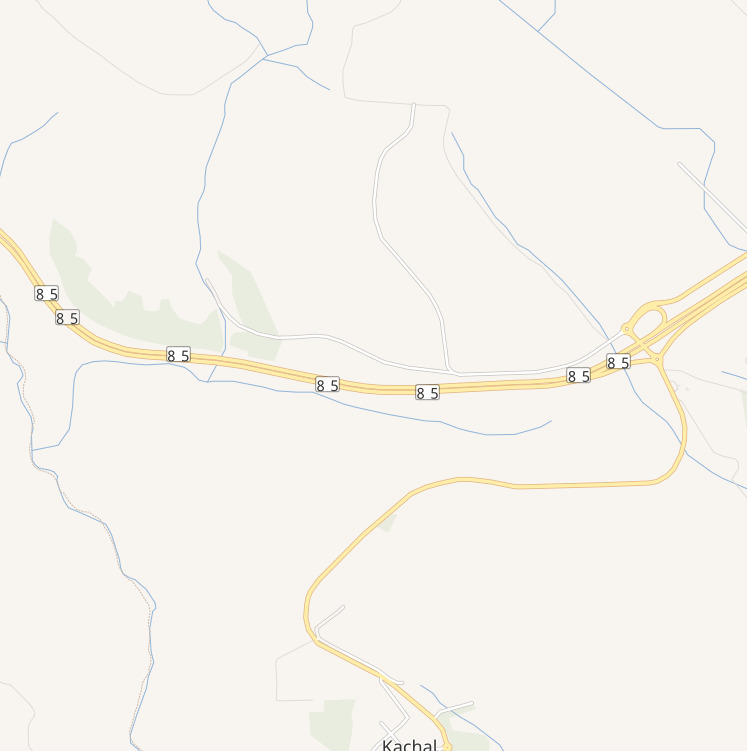
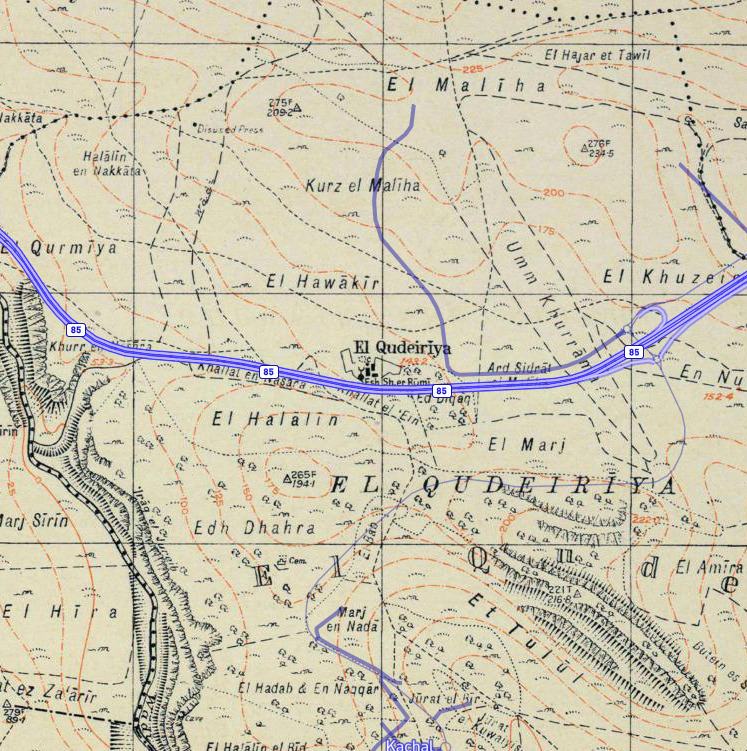
- 1870s map 1940s map modern map 1940s with modern overlay map A series of historical maps of the area around Al-Qudayriyya (click the buttons)

- Location within Mandatory Palestine
- Coordinates: 32°54′17″N 35°30′33″E
- Palestine grid: 197/256
- Geopolitical entity: Mandatory Palestine
- Subdistrict: Safad
- Date of depopulation: May 4, 1948

Population (1945)
  - Total: 390
- Cause(s) of depopulation: Military assault by Yishuv forces
- Secondary cause: Expulsion by Yishuv forces
- Current Localities: Kahal

Al-Qudayriyya (Arabic: القديرية) was a Palestinian Arab village in the Safad Subdistrict. On May 4, 1948 during the 1947–1948 Civil War in Mandatory Palestine, it was depopulated by the Haganah and the Palmach's First Battalion in Operation Matateh, a sub-operation of Operation Yiftach. It was located 6.5 km south of Safad and 1 km east of Wadi al-'Amud.

== History ==
In 1881, the PEF's Survey of Western Palestine described nearby Kh. en Nueiriyeh as having "heaps of drafted masonry on the top of terraced hill, with a rock-cut well and three rock-cut wine-presses". According to Khalidi, these were remains of Roman and Byzantine eras.

=== British Mandate era ===
In the 1922 census of Palestine, Qudairiyeh had a population of 194; all Muslims, falling to 72 in the 1931 census in a total of 14 houses.

In the 1945 statistics, the population was 390 Muslims, with a total of 12,487 dunams of land, according to an official land and population survey. Of this, 2,029 dunams were used for cereals, while 10,458 dunams were non-cultivable area.

The village had a shrine for a local sage known as al-Shaykh al-Rumi; Khirbat al-Nuwayriyya was also located there.

=== 1948, aftermath ===
The village was depopulated during Operation Matateh, on May 4, 1948.

== Bibliography ==
- Barron, J.B., ed. (1923). Palestine: Report and General Abstracts of the Census of 1922. Government of Palestine.
- Conder, C.R.; Kitchener, H.H. (1881). The Survey of Western Palestine: Memoirs of the Topography, Orography, Hydrography, and Archaeology. Vol. 1. London: Committee of the Palestine Exploration Fund.
- Department of Statistics (1945). Village Statistics, April, 1945. Government of Palestine.
- Hadawi, S. (1970). Village Statistics of 1945: A Classification of Land and Area ownership in Palestine. Palestine Liberation Organization Research Center. Archived from the original on 2018-12-08.
- Khalidi, W. (1992). All That Remains: The Palestinian Villages Occupied and Depopulated by Israel in 1948. Washington D.C.: Institute for Palestine Studies. ISBN 0-88728-224-5.
- Mills, E., ed. (1932). Census of Palestine 1931. Population of Villages, Towns and Administrative Areas. Jerusalem: Government of Palestine.
- Morris, B. (2004). The Birth of the Palestinian Refugee Problem Revisited. Cambridge University Press. ISBN 978-0-521-00967-6.
- Palmer, E.H. (1881). The Survey of Western Palestine: Arabic and English Name Lists Collected During the Survey by Lieutenants Conder and Kitchener, R. E. Transliterated and Explained by E.H. Palmer. Committee of the Palestine Exploration Fund.
- al-Qawuqji, F. (1972): Memoirs of al-Qawuqji, Fauzi in Journal of Palestine Studies
  - "Memoirs, 1948, Part I" in 1, no. 4 (Sum. 72): 27-58., dpf-file, downloadable
  - "Memoirs, 1948, Part II" in 2, no. 1 (Aut. 72): 3-33., dpf-file, downloadable
