= Al-Samakiyya =

Al-Samakiyya تلحوم/السمكية
- Village
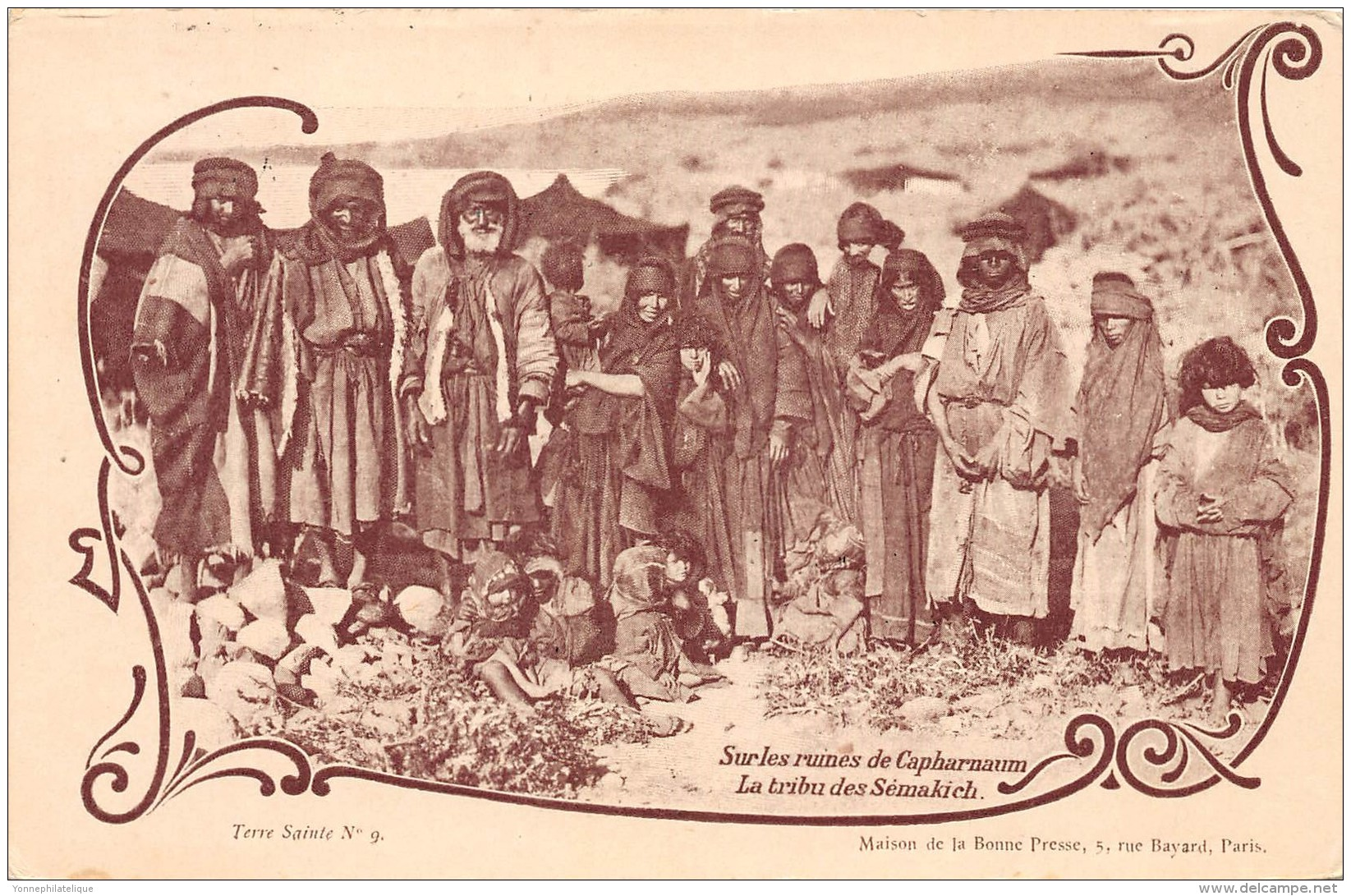
- Al-Samakiyya villagers, postcard from 1902
- Etymology: ’Arab es Semakîyeh, the Semakîyeh (fisher) Arabs
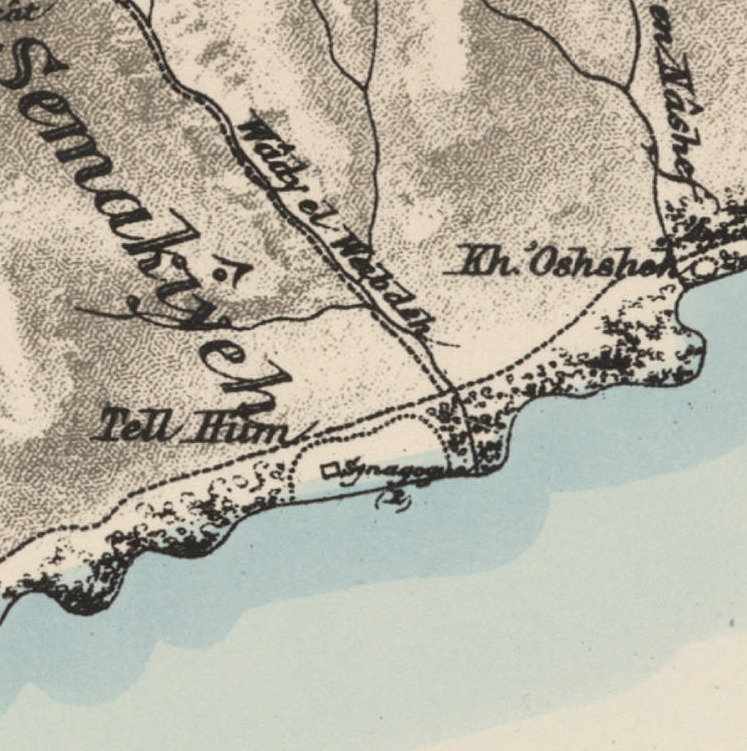
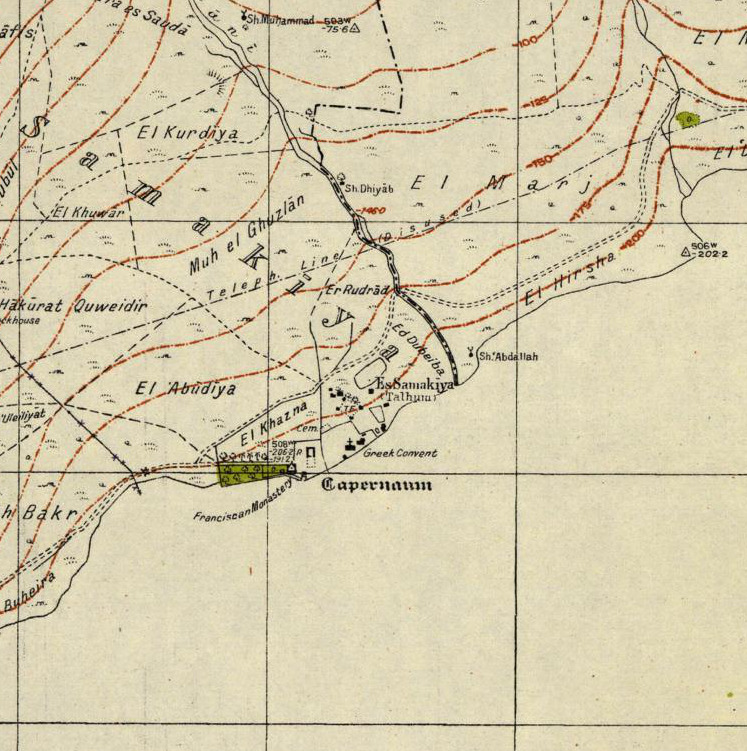
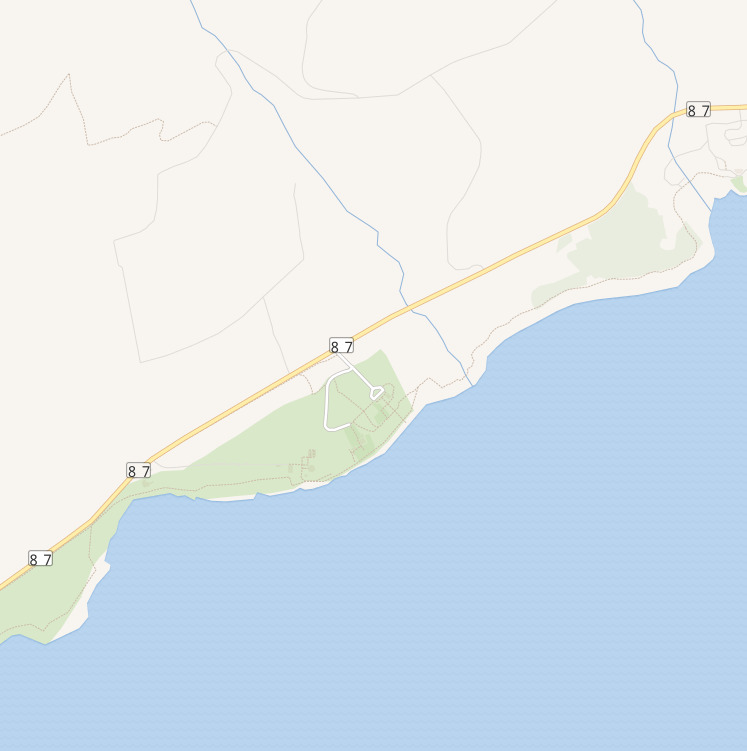
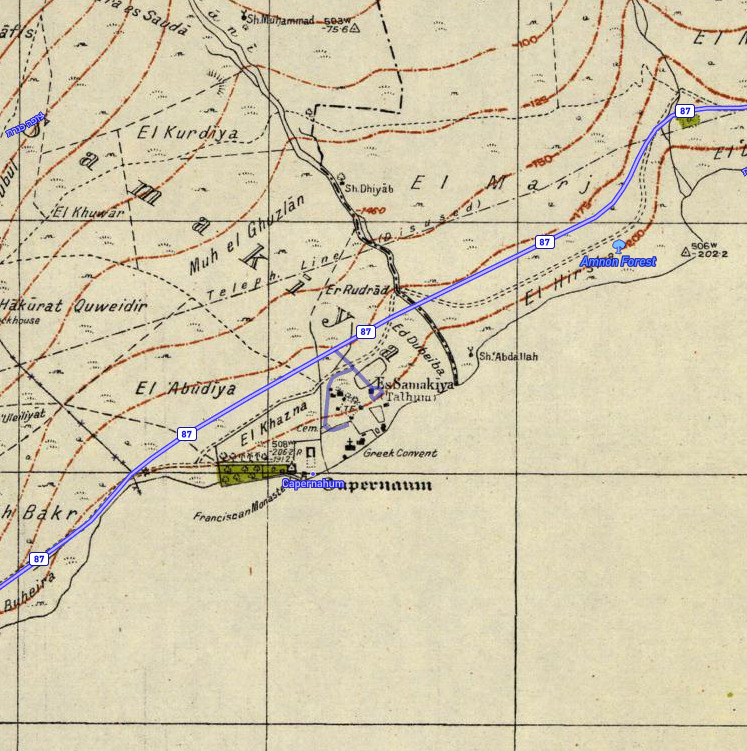
- 1870s map 1940s map modern map 1940s with modern overlay map A series of historical maps of the area around Al-Samakiyya (click the buttons)

- Location within Mandatory Palestine
- Coordinates: 32°53′02″N 35°34′41″E
- Palestine grid: 204/254
- Geopolitical entity: Mandatory Palestine
- Subdistrict: Tiberias
- Date of depopulation: Not known

Area
  - Total: 10,526 dunams (10.526 km^{2}; 4.064 sq mi)

Population (1945)
  - Total: 330 Muslims and 50 Christians connected to Capernaum ecclesiastic sites
- Current Localities: Amnun, Korazim

Al-Samakiyya was a Palestinian Arab village in the Tiberias Subdistrict. It was depopulated during the 1947–1948 Civil War in Mandatory Palestine on May 4, 1948, under Operation Matateh. It was located 11 km northeast of Tiberias, near the Wadi al-Wadabani. The village was located at Tel Hum, which has been identified with Capernaum.

== History ==
In 1838, Edward Robinson noted the bedawin (Bedouin) tribe of es-Semekiyeh, who kept some buildings in Abu Shusha as magazines.

=== British Mandate ===
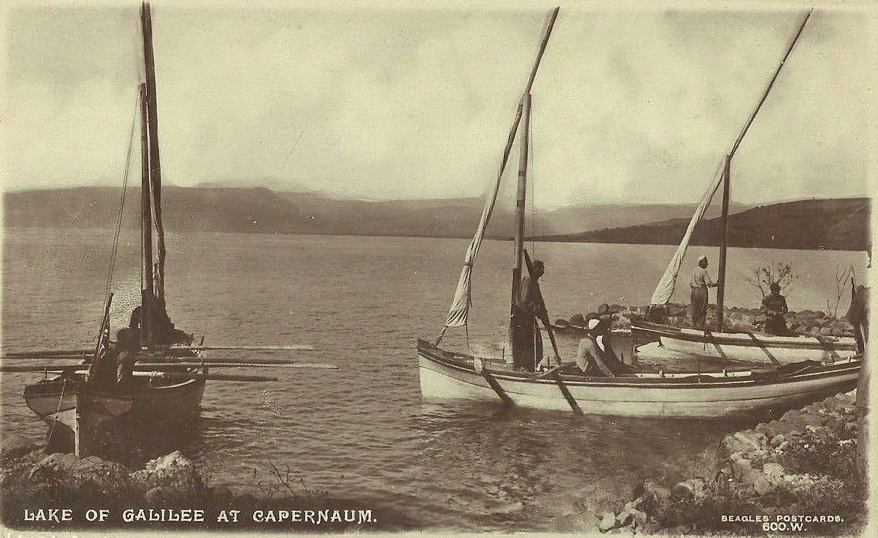
See of Galilee at Capernaum

In the 1922 census of Palestine conducted by the British Mandate authorities, the population of Samakiyeh was 193 Muslims, increasing in the 1931 census to 290; 266 Muslims and 24 Christians, in a total of 60 houses.

In the 1945 statistics Es Samakiya had a population of 380; 330 Muslims and 50 Christians, with 10,526 dunams of land. Of this, 2 dunams were used for citrus and bananas, 66 for plantations and irrigable land, 4,034 dunams for cereals, while a total of 6,424 dunams were classified as non-cultivable area.

Al-Samakiyya had an Italian monastery, a Franciscan church, and a Greek Orthodox church.

=== 1948 war and aftermath ===
On 4 May 1948, Yigal Allon launched Operation Matateh ('Operation Broom'), in order to clear the area of its Bedouin inhabitants. The Bedouin site is listed by Benny Morris as "'Arab al Samakiya (Samakiya/Talhum)".

Historian Saleh Abdel Jawad writes that five or more villagers were killed in "indiscriminate" killings by the Haganah. (Note: Saleh Abdel Jawad, 2007, Zionist Massacres: the Creation of the Palestinian Refugee Problem in the 1948 War. "4 May 1948: [...] As Samakiyya (‘Arab al-Samakiyya near Tiberias): Indiscriminate killings occur. The Haganah fires on fleeing civilians and kill at least three individuals from Tabigha, who had taken refuge in As Samakiyya. Among the dead are Ahmad Muhammed, Ahmad Abu-Fadil, Hamdih Khadrah, and the sister of Ahmad Yousef Ali.")

Amnun and Korazim were both established on Al-Samakiyya land in 1983.

In 1992, Palestinian historian Walid Khalidi wrote: "The village site is covered with wild vegetation, piles of basalt stones, and date palm trees. Part of the surrounding land is used as pasture, and the other part is planted with fruit and walnut trees."

== Bibliography ==
- Barron, J. B., ed. (1923). Palestine: Report and General Abstracts of the Census of 1922. Government of Palestine.
- Conder, C.R.; Kitchener, H. H. (1881). The Survey of Western Palestine: Memoirs of the Topography, Orography, Hydrography, and Archaeology. Vol. 1. London: Committee of the Palestine Exploration Fund.
- Department of Statistics (1945). Village Statistics, April, 1945. Government of Palestine.
- Hadawi, S. (1970). Village Statistics of 1945: A Classification of Land and Area ownership in Palestine. Palestine Liberation Organization Research Center. Archived from the original on 2018-12-08.
- Khalidi, W. (1992). All That Remains: The Palestinian Villages Occupied and Depopulated by Israel in 1948. Washington D.C.: Institute for Palestine Studies. ISBN 0-88728-224-5.
- Mills, E., ed. (1932). Census of Palestine 1931. Population of Villages, Towns and Administrative Areas. Jerusalem: Government of Palestine.
- Morris, B. (2004). The Birth of the Palestinian Refugee Problem Revisited. Cambridge University Press. ISBN 978-0-521-00967-6.
- Palmer, E. H. (1881). The Survey of Western Palestine: Arabic and English Name Lists Collected During the Survey by Lieutenants Conder and Kitchener, R. E. Transliterated and Explained by E.H. Palmer. Committee of the Palestine Exploration Fund.
- Robinson, E.; Smith, E. (1841). Biblical Researches in Palestine, Mount Sinai and Arabia Petraea: A Journal of Travels in the year 1838. Vol. 3. Boston: Crocker & Brewster.
