= Chorazin =

Ancient village in modern-day Israel

- Village
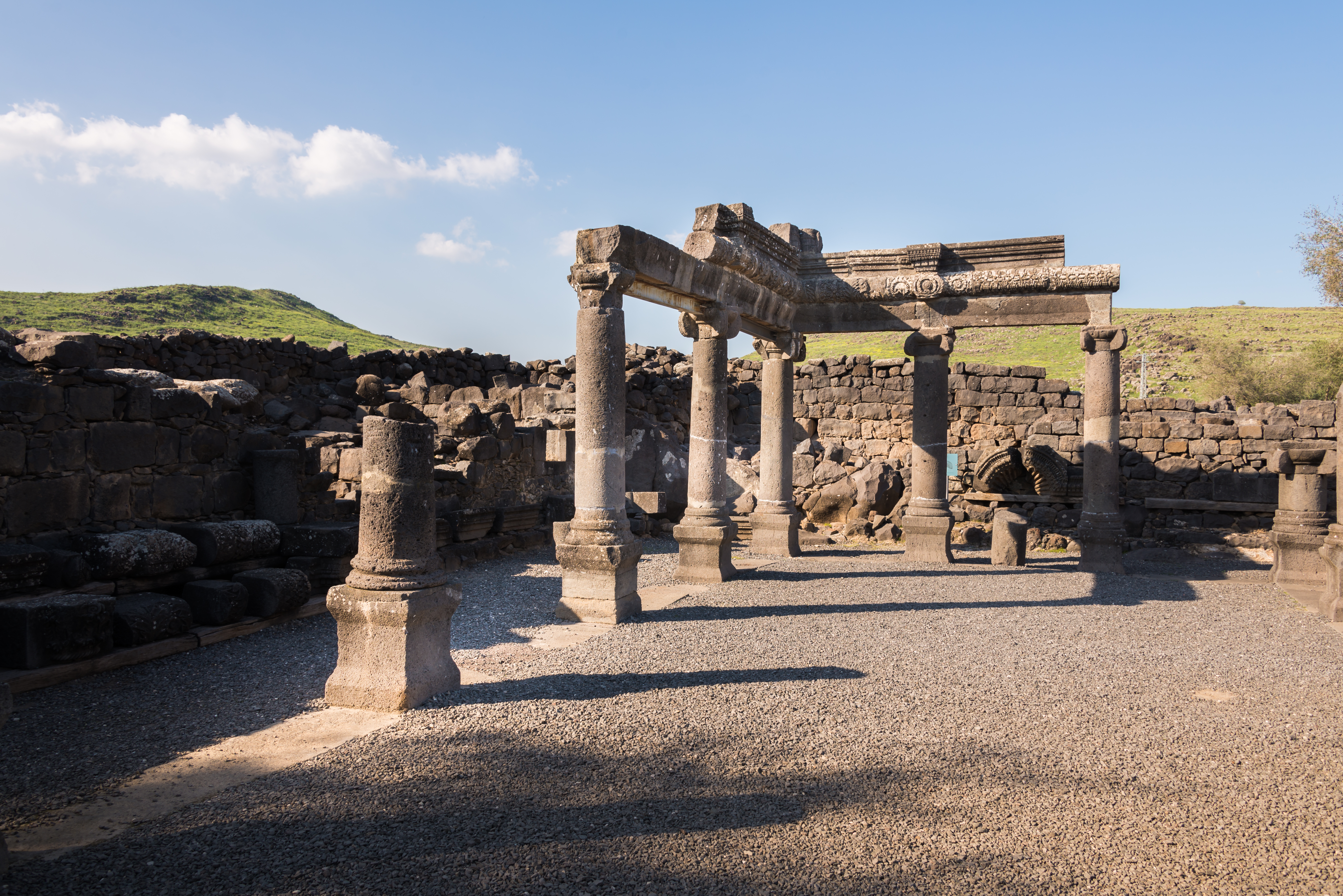
- Ancient synagogue at Chorazin
- Interactive map of Chorazin
- Coordinates: 32°54′40″N 35°33′46″E
- Date of depopulation: May 4, 1948

Chorazin (Greek: Χοραζίν /koʊˈreɪzɪn/; also Chorazain) or Korazim (Hebrew: כורזים) was an ancient village in the Roman and Byzantine periods, best known from the Christian Gospels. It stood on the Korazim Plateau in the Upper Galilee on a hill above the northern shore of the Sea of Galilee, 2.5 mi (4.0 km) from Capernaum in what is now the territory of modern Israel.

Khirbat Karraza (also Karraza, Kh. Karazeh, Kerazeh) was a village established at the site of the ancient village and depopulated during the 1947–1948 Civil War in Mandatory Palestine on May 4, 1948, by the Palmach's First Battalion during Operation Yiftach. It was located 8.5 km southeast of Safad.

The nearby Israeli town of Korazim is named for this location.

== History ==
Two settlement phases have been proposed based on coin and pottery findings. The town was partially destroyed in the 4th century, possibly as a result of an earthquake. The settlement of Khirbat Karraza subsequently developed on the site.

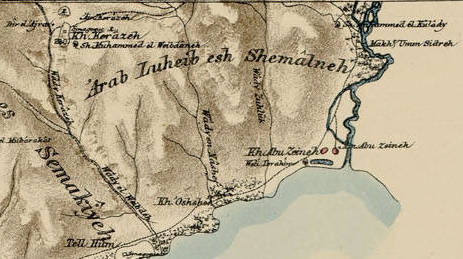
Khirbat Karraza in the PEF Survey of Palestine

During the Ottoman era, Khirbat Karraza was populated by the Bedouin of the Zangariyye tribe. A shrine for a local Muslim saint, al-Shaykh Ramadan, was located there. According to local legend, the villagers stored their grain close by, certain that nobody would steal it and thereby violate the sanctity of the shrine.

In 1992, Palestinian historian Walid Khalidi reported that some of the village houses were still standing and an older building had been renovated. He says the tomb of Shaykh Ramadan was crumbling and the building that once housed it was gone. The tomb was surrounded by large carob trees."

== Archaeology ==
Excavations of Chorazin commenced in 1905 and resumed in the 1920s. Further excavations were carried out in 1962–1964, and resumed in 1980–1987. In 2004, a small-scale salvage excavation was conducted by the Israel Antiquities Authority along the route of an ancient road north of Moshav Amnun. In the literature, the road is referred to as "the way through Korazim." It crossed the Chorazin plateau from west to east, branching off from the main Cairo–Damascus road that ran northeast toward Daughters of Jacob Bridge.

The main settlement dates to the 3rd and 4th centuries. Most of the structures were from basalt, a black volcanic rock found locally. The ruins are spread over an area of 25 acres (100,000 m^{2}), subdivided into five separate quarters, with a synagogue in the centre. Close by is a ritual bath (mikvah), surrounded by public and residential buildings. Several millstones used in olive oil extraction suggest that Chorazim, like other villages in ancient Galilee, earned their living from olive cultivation.

In June 2026, a twelve-year-old boy discovered a 1,500-year-old blue gemstone during an archeological dig in the Korazim National Park. Achia Kohn-Tavorn identified it as a type of agate stone used by the Romans in jewelry as a symbol of wealth.

=== Ancient synagogue ===
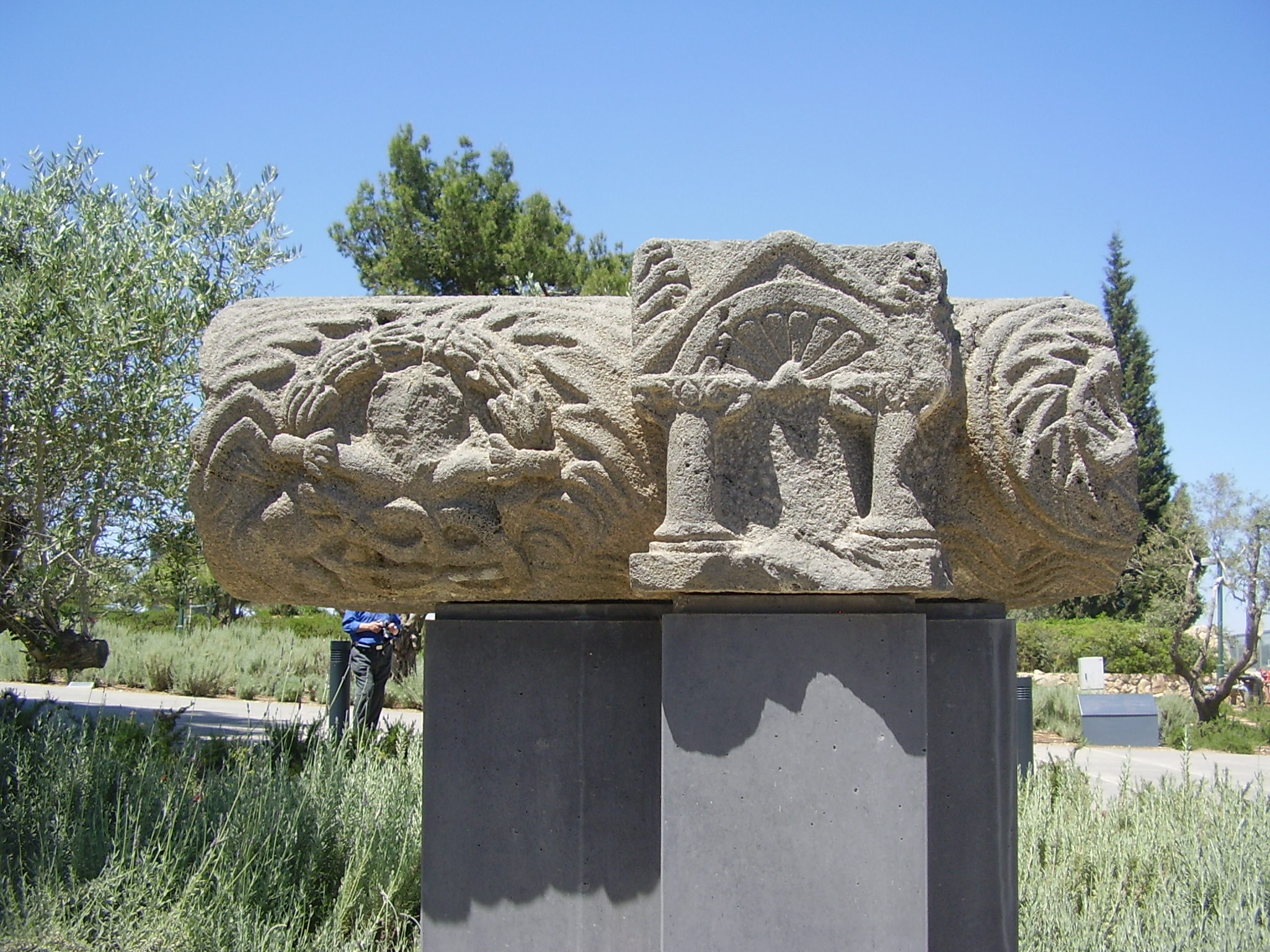
Decorated stone from the synagogue

A synagogue whose ruins are still visible today was built in the late 3rd century, destroyed in the 4th century, and rebuilt in the 6th century. The large synagogue which was built of basalt stones and decorated with Jewish motifs is the most striking of the surviving structures. An unusual feature in an ancient synagogue is the presence of three-dimensional sculpture, a pair of stone lions. A similar pair of lions was found in the synagogue at Kfar Bar'am. Other carvings, which are thought to have originally been brightly painted, feature images of wine-making, animals, a Medusa, an armed soldier, and an eagle.

Jacob Ory (born 1898 in Russia), who excavated the site in 1926 on behalf of the British Mandate Department of Antiquities, wrote about a second synagogue ca. 200 m west of the first one, and he described it in detail. Later excavations, however, have not been able to find the remains noted by him and confirm the existence of such a building.

== New Testament ==
Chorazin, along with Bethsaida and Capernaum, was named in the Christian gospels of Matthew and Luke as cities in which Jesus of Nazareth performed his mission. However, because these towns seemingly rejected his message ("they had not changed their ways"), they were subsequently cursed (Matthew 11:20-24; Luke 10:13-15). Because of this condemnation, the influential but non-canonical Apocalypse of Pseudo-Methodius predicted that the Antichrist would be conceived in Chorazin.

== Identification ==
The English theologian John Lightfoot writing in the 17th century suggested that Chorazin might have referred to a wider area around Cana in Galilee, rather than a single city/village:

What if, under this name, Cana be concluded, and some small country adjacent, which, from its situation in a wood, might be named "Chorazin", that is, 'the woody country'? Cana is famous for the frequent presence and miracles of Christ. But away with conjecture, when it grows too bold.

In his Biblical Researches in Palestine in the mid-nineteenth century, Edward Robinson visited Khirbat Karraza, but concluded it was not the Biblical Chorazin, because the ruins were not significant enough and the site was not near the shore of the Sea of Galilee, as stated by Jerome (Lacum Genesareth, in cujus litore Capernaum et Tiberias et Bethsaida et Chorozaim sitæ sint):

The ruins we had been told of lie on the west side of this same valley, a quarter of a mile southwest, near its entrance into the main Wady. They consist simply of a few foundations of black stones; the remains evidently of a poor and inconsiderable village. They are known as Khirbet Kerâzeh. We did not go to them, as there was no path; and because they were in full view. Their distance from Tell Hùm must be reckoned at about three miles. We had come to this spot, because the name Kerázeh bears a degree of resemblance to the Chorazin of the New Testament; and we hoped to find, in the ruins or the situation, something which might determine the position of that ancient place. In this we felt ourselves disappointed. The remains are too trivial to have ever belonged to a place of any importance. Chorazin, too, according to Jerome, lay upon the shore of the lake; but this site is an hour distant. shut in among the hills, without any view of the lake, and remote from any public road whether ancient or modern.

== Cultural references ==
Chorazin is referred to in the 1904 ghost story "Count Magnus", by M. R. James.

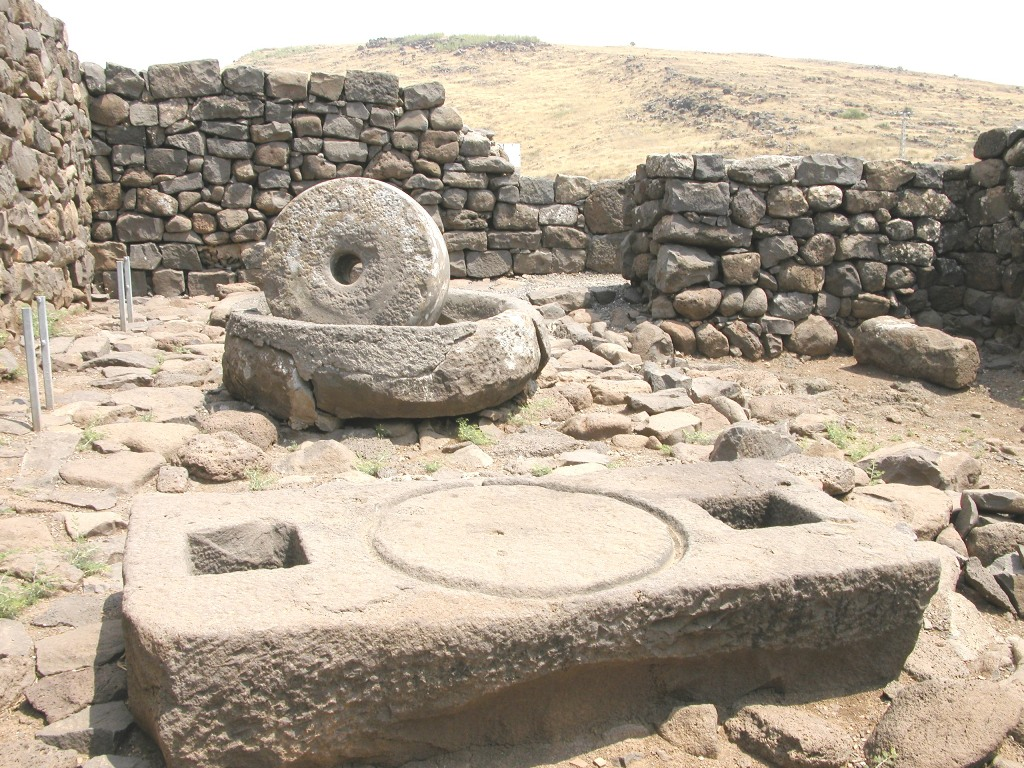
Olive oil press

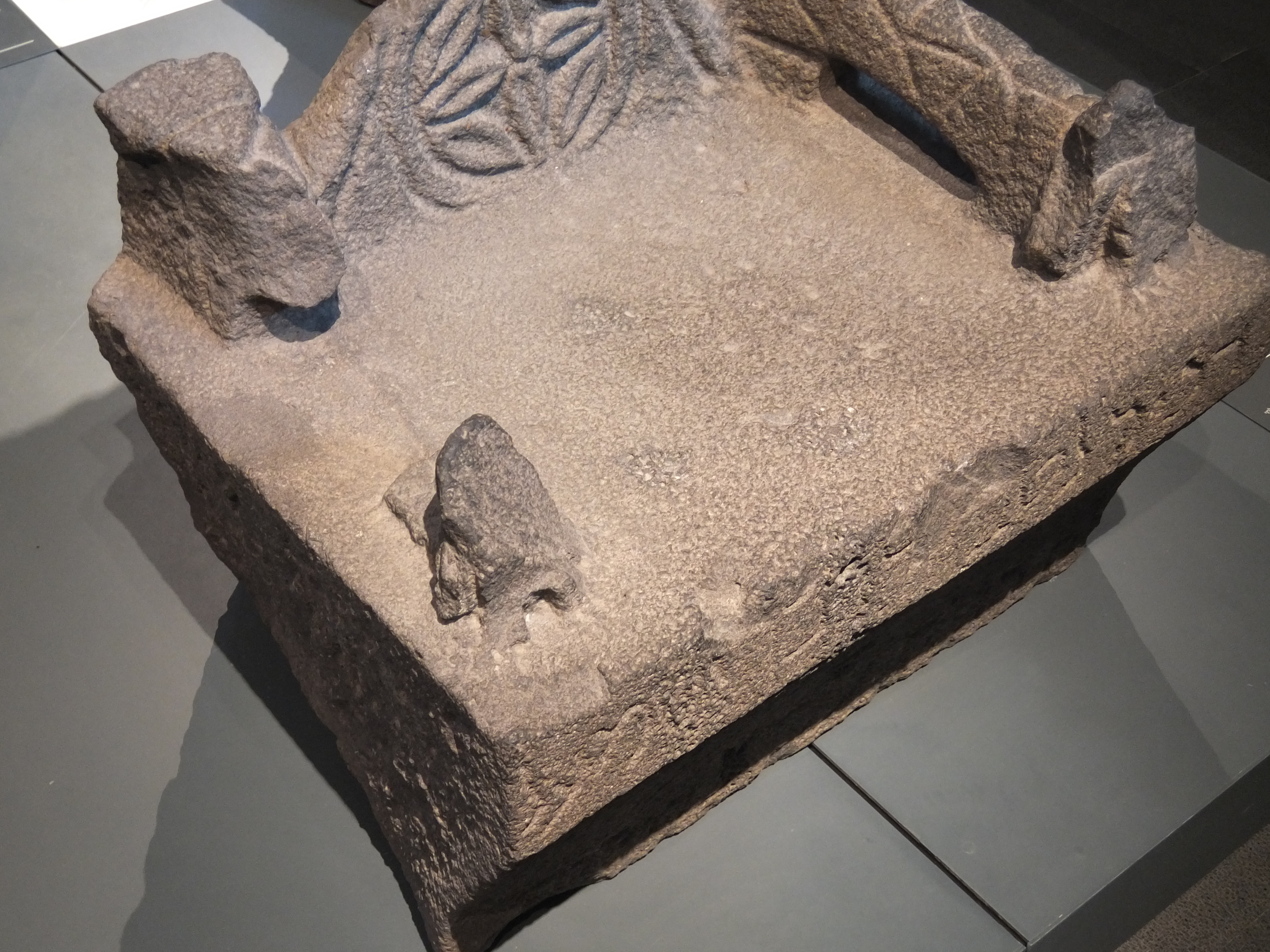
Stone seat from the synagogue

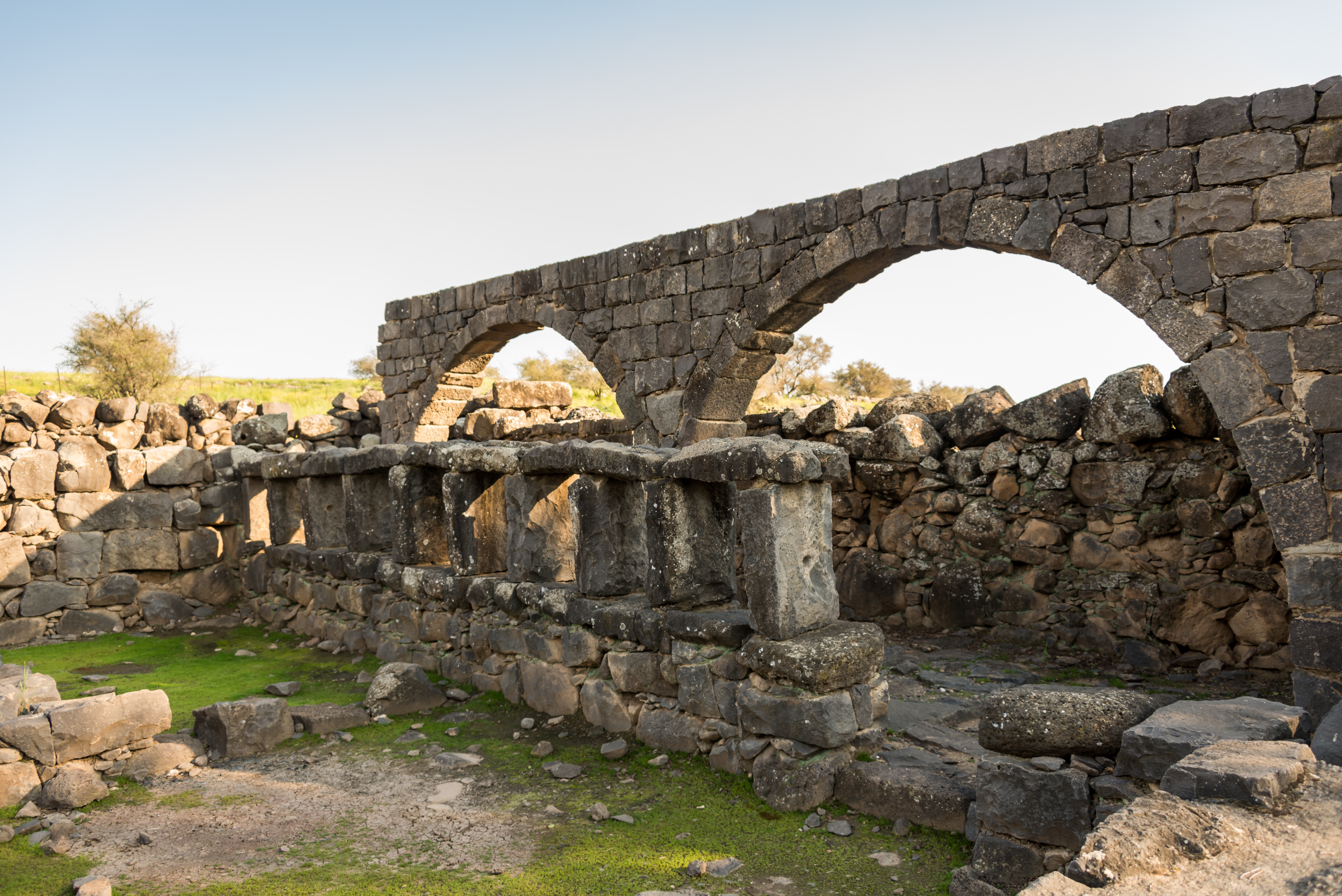
Chorazim ruins

== See also ==
- Ancient synagogues in Palestine
- Ancient synagogues in Israel
- Archaeology of Israel
- Jesus trail
- National parks of Israel
- Oldest synagogues in the world

== Bibliography ==
- Khalidi, W. (1992). All That Remains: The Palestinian Villages Occupied and Depopulated by Israel in 1948. Washington D.C.: Institute for Palestine Studies. ISBN 0-88728-224-5.
- Morris, B. (2004). The Birth of the Palestinian Refugee Problem Revisited. Cambridge University Press. ISBN 978-0-521-00967-6.
- Stemberger, Günter (2000). Jews and Christians in the Holy Land: Palestine in the fourth century. Continuum International Publishing Group. ISBN 978-0-567-08699-0.
- Z. Yeivin, The Synagogue at Korazim; The 1962 - 1964, 1980 - 1987 Excavations, Israel Antiquities Authority Reports, Israel Antiquities Authority, 2000.
- New Encyclopedia of Archaeological Excavations in the Holy Land vols. 1–5. Ed. E. Stern; Jerusalem: Israel Exploration Society and Carta (1993-2008).
