= Korazim Plateau =

Volcanic plateau in northern Israel

Coordinates: 32°56′N 35°35′E

Location of the Korazim Plateau in Israel

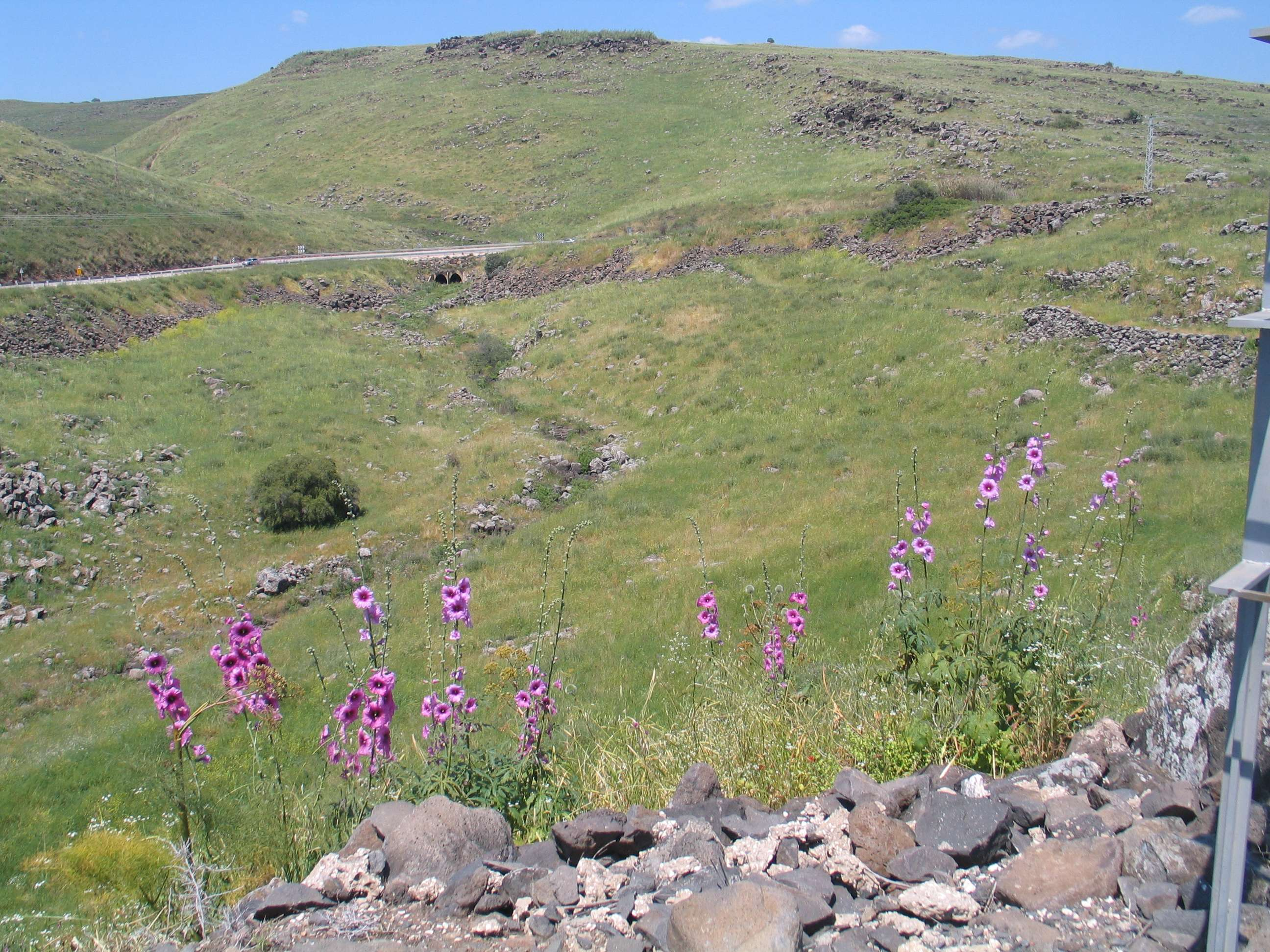
Ramat Korazim

The Korazim Plateau (Hebrew: רמת כורזים, Ramat Korazim, also spelled Corazim) is a volcanic plateau in northern Israel. The plateau is bounded by the Hula Valley in the north, Sea of Galilee in the south, the mountains of the Galilee to the west and the Jordan River to the east. It is named after an ancient Jewish settlement also known as "Chorazin". The highest point is Philon Hill, which is 409 meters above sea level.

Towns on the plateau include Rosh Pinna, Hatzor HaGlilit and Tuba-Zangariyye. The rural communities in the region are administered by the Upper Galilee Regional Council, Mevo'ot HaHermon Regional Council and Emek HaYarden Regional Council. Notable archaeological and historical sites include Tel Hazor, Daughters of Jacob Bridge, Mount of Beatitudes and Jubb Yussef.

Historically the plateau served as a waystation from north to south and east to west. Armies passed through the plateau towards the Golan during the Palestine Campaign of World War I in 1918, the 1948 Arab–Israeli war, Six Day War and Yom Kippur War.

== Geography ==
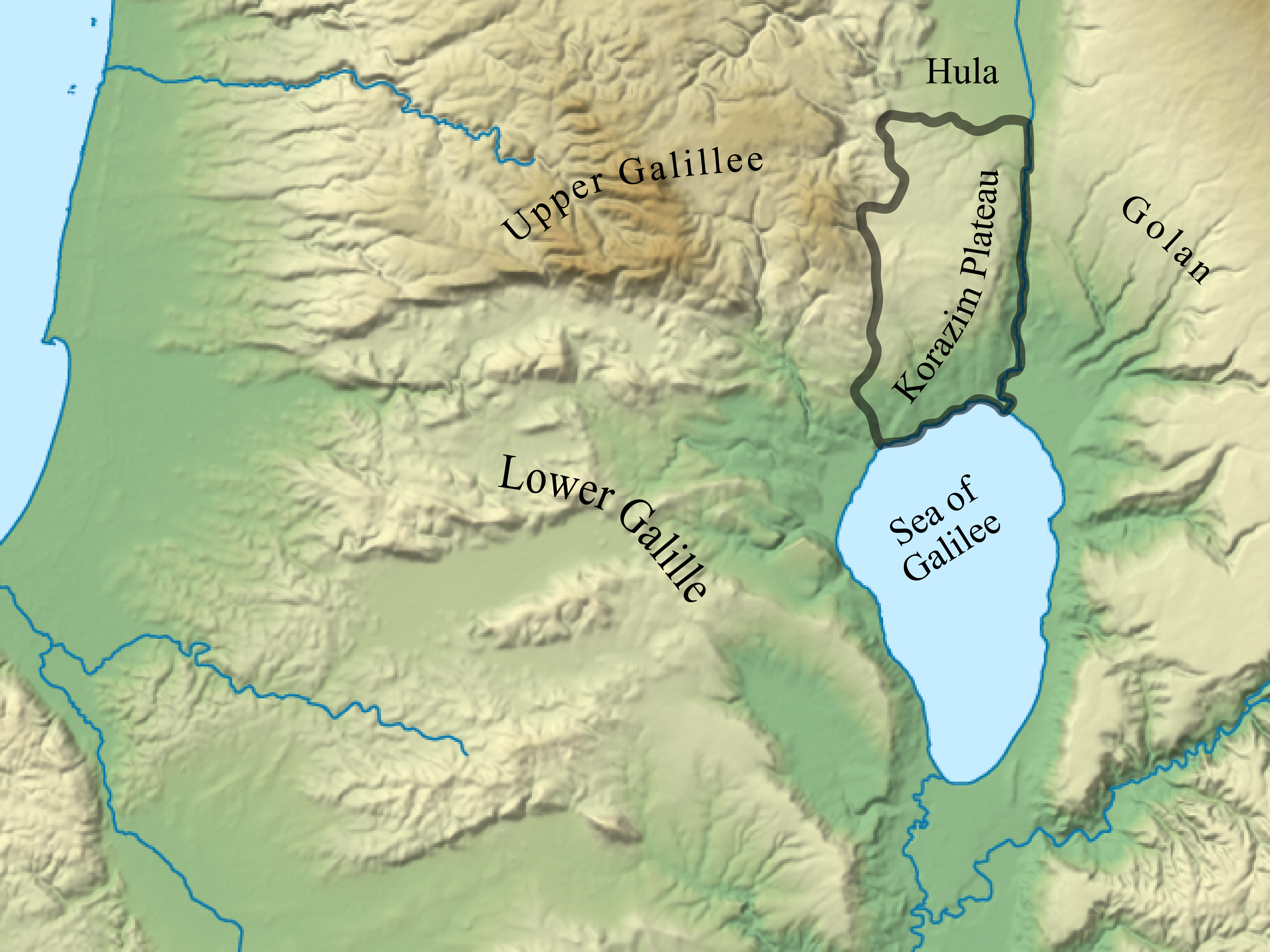
Relief map showing roughly the boundaries the Korzim Plateau

The Korazim Plateau is a distinct geographical region that is not part of either of the regions that surround it. According to Ministry of Environmental Protection the plateau is bounded by the Safed and Naftali Mountains (west), the Hula Valley (north), the Jordan River and Golan Heights (east) and the Sea of Galilee, excluding the narrow coastal strip (south). Within these boundaries the region measures 117 km^{2}. The archaeological survey of the Israel Antiquities Authority also included parts of the mountains to the west and the shoreline of the Sea of Galilee, bringing the total area to 135 km^{2}.

== Geology and geomorphology ==
The term Korazim Plateau is used to define a geomorphological feature set between the Hula Basin and the Sea of Galilee. It is an elevated pressure ridge within the Dead Sea Transform (DST) which acted as a barrier against the waters of the Mediterranean when these flooded the lower-lying part of the DST, between what are now the Sea of Galilee and the Dead Sea basins, during the Pliocene transgression. The elevated Korazim block as well as the higher elevation of the Hula Basin meant that the latter did not receive any marine water during that process.

Geologically, the plateau is divided into two main sections. The southern two-thirds are covered in layers of basalt. The basalt area falls from a height of 409 meters above sea level to 210 meters below sea level at the coast of the Sea of Galilee. The basalt is aged between 1.6 and 2.9 million years in the northern part as measured near Kfar HaNassi, and 3.5 to 5 million years in the lower part as measured near the village of Korazim. Some volcanic cones were found near Tel Ruman, Filon Hill and probably also in Tel Nes and Tel Ya'af. The origin of the young basalt is probably from these volcanic cones, but the older part of the basalt is part of a big layer of basalt which also covers the Golan Heights and southern Syria.

The basalt part of the plateau is very similar to the nearby Golan with its rocky landscape, the characters of the ancient settlements found there, as well as the abundance of dolmens found here. The northern third of the plateau is characterized by lower hills of limestone, conglomerate and some young basalt near Yarda. The height of this part ranges between 100 and 250 meters above sea level. On this area, the city of Hazor was established, which was an important city in ancient and biblical times. Some limestone layers can also be found in around the banks of the Jordan River (such as the area of the Daughters of Jacob Bridge). The plateau is bounded by faults to the east (the Jordan River Valley) and to the west (on the slopes of Mount Canaan). Other signs of fracture in the basalt indicate recent tectonic activity in the region, which may be the cause of the Galilee earthquake of 1837.

== Water ==
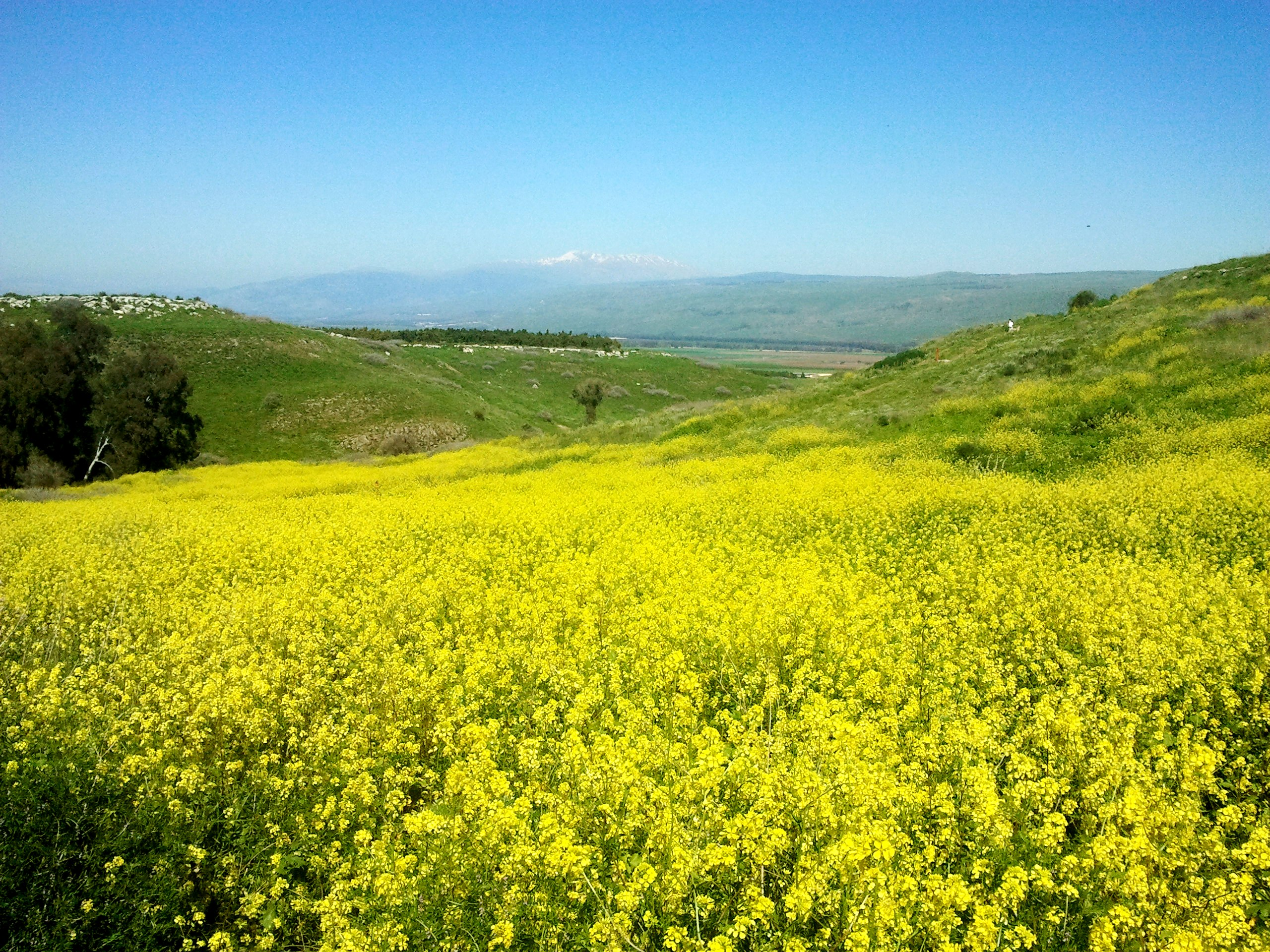
Mahanayim River valley

The rivers of the Korazim Plateau flow eastward to the Jordan River, and southward to the Sea of Galilee. The biggest river in the region is the Rosh Pinna River, which is 13 kilometer long and has a water basin of 40 square kilometers, which flows to the Jordan. Other rivers include the Mahanayim River and Tubim River, which flow to the Jordan as well, and the Korazim River, Or River and Koach River which flow to the Sea of Galilee. Next to these rivers, there are plenty of springs, around which many ancient settlements existed.

== Archaeology ==
During the 19th century, the Korazim Plateau, as well as the rest of the country, was surveyed by European explorers. French explorer Victor Guérin and the PEF Survey of Palestine headed by Claude Reignier Conder and Herbert Kitchener described the various sites in the plateau. In the early 20th century the area was studied by German explorer Paul Karge and British archaeologist Francis Turville-Petre. During the late 20th century, Israeli and European archaeologists made extensive excavations in the major sites of Tel Hazor, Tel Kinrot and Daughters of Jacob Bridge, all on the edges of the plateau. In 1990 a systematic and extensive survey project began headed by Yosef Stepansky. on behalf of the Israel Antiquities Authority.

Although the Korazim Plateau is considered a peripheral area, during most of its history, it was a dense region as evidenced by the remains of over a hundred ancient settlements which were discovered by archaeologists. The rural basalt regions in the center and south of the plateau were inhabited by semi-nomadic people. The plateau's location allowed it to serve as a transit region for the valleys to the north and south, and the heights to the east and west.

=== Chalcolithic period ===
The plateau was first settled extensively during the Chalcolithic period (4th millennium BCE). Over 25 settlements were established in that period in the plateau's basalt areas. These settlements resemble the Golan Heights, Hula Valley, and the Dalton Plateau's Chalcolithic cultures, with distinctive pottery and rectangular houses.

=== Bronze Age ===
Through the Early Bronze Age settlement continued to exist only in some of the Chalcolithic sites, and a few new sites were formed, mostly in the northern part of the plateau. During Early Bronze Age II (3000–2700 BCE) the city of Hazor was first established, while in the rest of the plateau there were between 10 and 15 settlements. In that period there was a growth in the settlements in the southern slopes of the plateau on the shores of the Sea of Galilee. As Hazor grew to be one of Canaan's largest and most influential cities, the settlements in the Korazim Plateau became its suburban area. During Early Bronze Age III (2700–2200 BCE), the city of Hazor grew to the size of an urban settlement with an area of between 100 and 150 dunams, while all of the plateau's settlements were depopulated. During Middle Bronze Age I (2200–2000 BCE), Hazor shrank to a small village, while in the plateau there was only one settlement in Khirbet Berech. In that period hundreds of megalithic tombs called "Dolmens" were built in the southern part of the plateau. During Middle Bronze Age II (2000–1550 BCE) the size of Hazor reached its peak as a metropolis of 800 to 1000 dunams. Some 15 to 20 small villages existed on the plateau during that period, most of which next to springs. In total their combined size was between 100 and 150 dunams. During the Late Bronze Age (1550–1200 BCE), the city of Hazor became smaller but still was the largest in Canaan at 700–800 dunams. Only two settlements existed in Tel Kinnarot and Kfar Nahum.

=== Iron Age ===
After the Late Bronze Age collapse and during Iron Age I (1200–1000 BCE) the city of Hazor was destroyed and replaced by a semi-nomadic settlement, while the settlement in the Korazim Plateau flourished, with 10 settlements with a combined area of 100 dunams and a city in Tel Kinnarot of 100 dunams alone. Between 1000 BCE and the Assyrian conquest in 733, Hazor became a royal center, while the settlement in the plateau increased with 20 settlements, some of which were fortified and they had a combined area of 200–250 dunams.

== Modern settlement ==
Because the soil is difficult to cultivate, and there is a lack of water sources, the number of settlements on the Korazim Plateau is low. These are, from north to south: Ayelet HaShahar, Gadot, Mishmar HaYarden, Mahanayim, Hatzor HaGlilit, Kfar HaNassi, Rosh Pinna, Tuba-Zangariyye, Elifelet, Karkom, Ami'ad, Korazim, Almagor and Amnun. All of the settlements are Jewish and rural, except for the Muslim Bedouin town of Tuba-Zangariyye.

== Bibliography ==
- Yosef Stepansky (2002), "Ramat Korazim" (in Hebrew). Jerusalem: Ariel: Journal for Knowledge of the Land of Israel: The Eastern Upper Galilee and Ramat Korazim, edited by Gabriel Barkai and Eli Shiller.
- Yosef Stepansky (2008), "Between Hatzor and Kinneret: Ramat Kozraim in the Time of the Bible" (in Hebrew). Jerusalem: Ariel: Journal for Knowledge of the Land of Israel: In the Mountain, Shephela and Arava: Studies Served to Adam Zertal in the Thirtieth Year to the Menashe Survey, pp. 271–289.
