= Tuba-Zangariyye =

Bedouin town in northern Israel

Tuba-Zangariyye: טוּבָּא-זַנְגָרִיָה; طوبة زنغرية
- Local council (from 1988)

Hebrew transcription(s)
  - Also spelled: Tuba al-Zanghariyya (official)
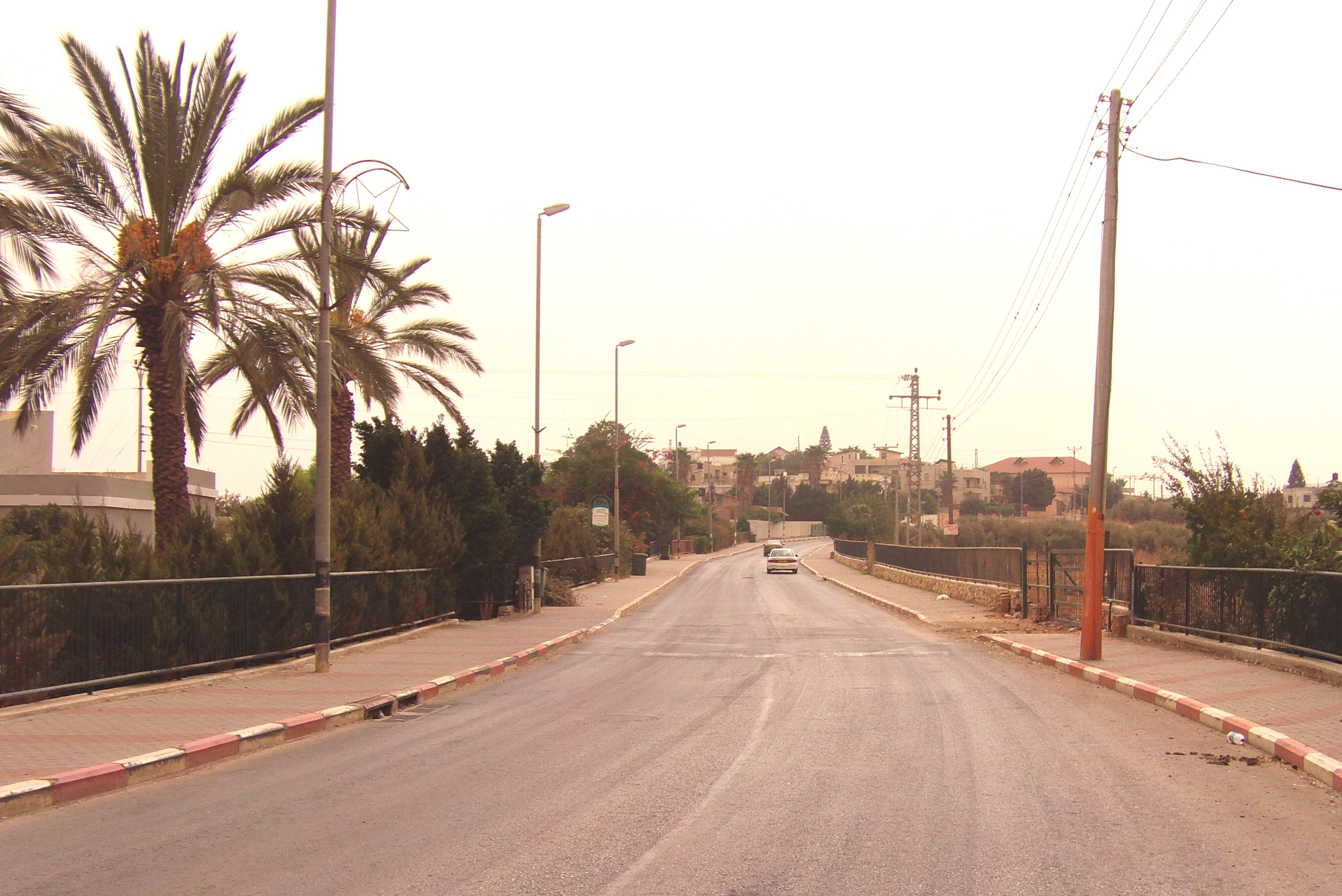
- Entrance to Tuba-Zangariyye

- Location within Israel Location within Northeast Israel
- Coordinates: 32°57′58″N 35°35′36″E
- Country: Israel
- District: Northern
- Subdistrict: Safed
- Natural Region: Hazor
- Founded: 1908

Area
  - Total: 1,962 dunams (1.962 km^{2}; 0.758 sq mi)

Population (2024)
  - Total: 7,173
  - Density: 3,656/km^{2} (9,469/sq mi)

Tuba-Zangariyye or Tuba al-Zanghariyya (Arabic: طوبه زنغرية, Hebrew: טוּבָּא-זַנְגָרִיָה) is a Bedouin town in the Northern District of Israel. Located in the Korazim Plateau, it achieved local council status in 1988 It was formed by the merger of two villages, Tuba and al-Zangariyye. Populated by the Bedouin tribe of El Heib, Tuba is situated near Kfar Hanassi, overlooking the Jordan River, and sits 250 meters above sea level. In 2024 it had a population of 7,173.

== History ==
=== Ottoman period ===
The villages were named after the Bedouin tribes historically recorded ' Bedouin al-Zanghariyya and 'Arab al-Hayb, who lived in tents near Ein Tuba (Tuba Spring). The nomads first lived in tent encampments and later settled villages, established in 1908. According to geographer Arnon Medzini, the al-Heib Bedouin tribe originated in Iraq, migrated to the Golan Heights during the Ottoman period, and later settled in the Hula Valley.

=== British Mandate ===
The Bedouins of Tuba had long standing ties with the nearby Jewish communities and helped defend them in the 1936–1939 Arab revolt in Palestine. During the 1948 Arab–Israeli War, the inhabitants formed an alliance with the Haganah, defending Jewish communities in the Upper Galilee against Syria. Some joined the Pal-Heib unit of the Haganah.

The two towns were captured by Haganah forces on 4 May 1948 during a sub-operation of Operation Yiftach. Al-Zangariyye was virtually destroyed but Tuba was not attacked by Israeli forces and remained intact. Most of the inhabitants who fled the two villages prior to their captures, moved eastward into Syria or in the case of many al-Zangariyye residents, to Tuba.

=== State of Israel ===
In 1948, Sheik Hussein Mohammed Ali Abu Yussef of Tuba said: "Is it not written in the Koran that the ties of neighbors are as dear as those of relations? Our friendship with the Jews goes back many years. We felt we could trust them and they learned from us too." The Bedouins lived in tent encampments until the 1960s.

==== 2011 mosque torching affair ====
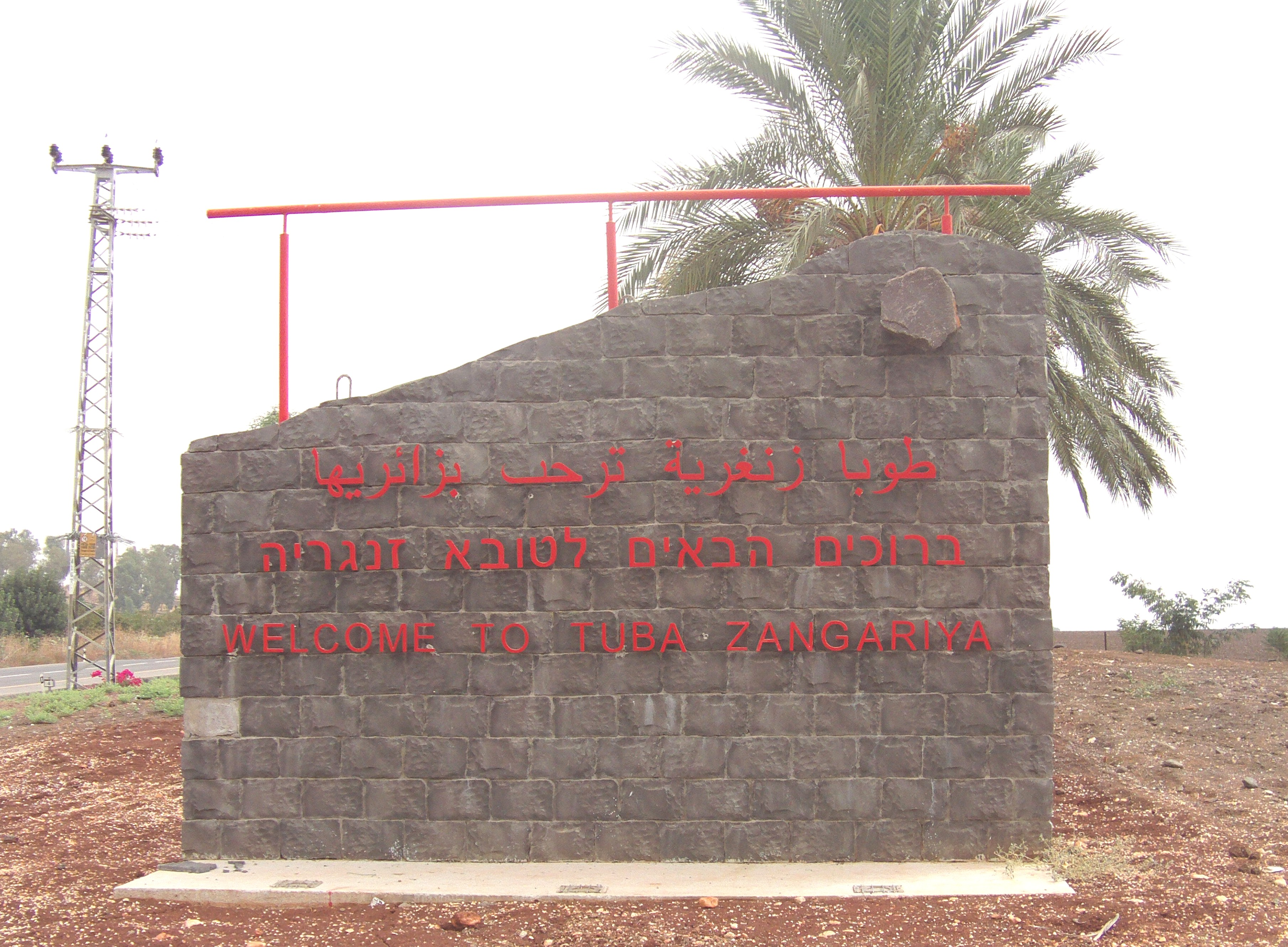
Sign at the entrance of Tuba-Zangariya

In October 2011, one of the town mosques was torched in what was presumed to be a 'price tag' operation. The attack shocked Israelis, as many Bedouins, including those from this village, serve in the Israel Defense Forces. Israeli President Shimon Peres denounced the attack, saying that "It is unconscionable that a Jew would harm something that is holy to another religion ... We will not allow extremists and criminals to undercut the need to live together equally in equality and mutual respect."

During a visit to the mosque, the Chief Sephardic Rabbi of Israel, Shlomo Amar, and Chief Ashkenazi Rabbi Yona Metzger, jointly condemned the act and conveyed a message of reconciliation to the village residents. Amar said that he saw it as his duty to set a personal example for the respect one must show to places holy to different religions. He stresses that in lieu of proof, the act may have not been committed by Jews, and the attempt to ascribe the act to price tag activists may be in fact a blood libel. He also added that if the arsonist was in fact Jewish—he was subject to some of the Jewish laws of Dinei Rodef.

Safed Rabbi Shmuel Eliyahu said that the attack was "inappropriate" but would not condemn it, saying no proof has been given that Jewish extremists were responsible.

The circumstances of the attack were questioned by some media sources, who suggested the possibility of an inside job. The graffiti that defaced the walls was written with coal and not paint. It was written on a part of the wall that was not obscured by soot, but rather below the soot-covered section. The mosque was located near village homes, and several others were closer to the main highway, several miles away. A Bedouin resident of the village went on television to say he thought the attack on the local mosque was perpetrated by Arabs local residents rather than Jews. According to Bassem Souad, "A Jew will not come and burn down this mosque. The one who burned the mosque is one of our own. I say this because I am not afraid of anyone. He is from the village, to my great regret." In response several shots were fired at his home.

Village youths responded by setting fire to the local council building and spraying the facades of a community sports center and health clinic with bullets. A Jewish-owned field nearby was also torched.

== Local government ==
Tuba-Zangariyye achieved local council status in 1988. In 2008, the chairmanship of the local council was assumed by Zvika Fogel, a retired Israeli general. Fogel was appointed by the Interior Minister to oversee the operations of the local council which suffered from mismanagement. In 2009, Fogel's car was torched outside his office and shots were fired at his office windows. He decided to resign in January 2012, months after a riot due to an arson at a town mosque committed by Jewish extremists.

== Education and culture ==
In 1997, an international horse show and equestrian display, "Susstival," was hosted by Tuba-Zangariyye (Hebrew: סוס sus means "horse"). The event was organized in conjunction with the Royal Hashemite Stables and top riders from Jordan came to Israel to participate. Leading local riders included Ahmed El-Heib Abu-Hassan, a former Border Patrol commanding officer.

In 2002, a resident of Tuba Zangariyye, Sgt. Saleh Abdalah, was chosen to light a torch at the main ceremony on Israel Independence Day as an outstanding soldier and a local police volunteer.

In 2006, the Education for Active Citizenship program, a partnership of the Israel Venture Network and the New Israel Fund, was launched in Tuba-Zangariyye to promote democratic values and community activism. The program began with an arts event organized by the Education Department of the Nahum Gutmann Museum of Art.

== Voting Patterns ==
In the 2022 election, 89 percent of voters in Tuba-Zangariyye voted for the Arab parties, while 6 percent voted for the parties of the center-left coalition led by Yair Lapid and 3 percent voted for the parties of the right-wing coalition led by Benjamin Netanyahu. Among the voters for the Arab parties, 78 percent voted for Ra'am, while 14 percent voted for the Hadash–Ta'al list and 8 percent voted for Balad.

In the 2026 election, 92 percent of voters in Tuba-Zangariyye voted for the Arab parties, while 6 percent voted for the parties of the center-left coalition led by Gadi Eisenkot and 0.5 percent voted for the parties of the right-wing coalition led by Benjamin Netanyahu. Among the voters for the Arab parties, 86 percent voted for Ra'am, while 14 percent voted for the Joint List. Voter turnout increased 89 percent from the 2022 election.

== See also ==
- Bedouin localities in Israel
- Bedouin In Israel

Former and current villages inhabited by the Zanghariyya Bedouin tribe:

- Al-Zanghariyya
- Khirbat Karraza (Chorazin)
