= Korazim =

Community settlement in northern Israel

Korazim: כורזים (Hebrew)
- Community settlement
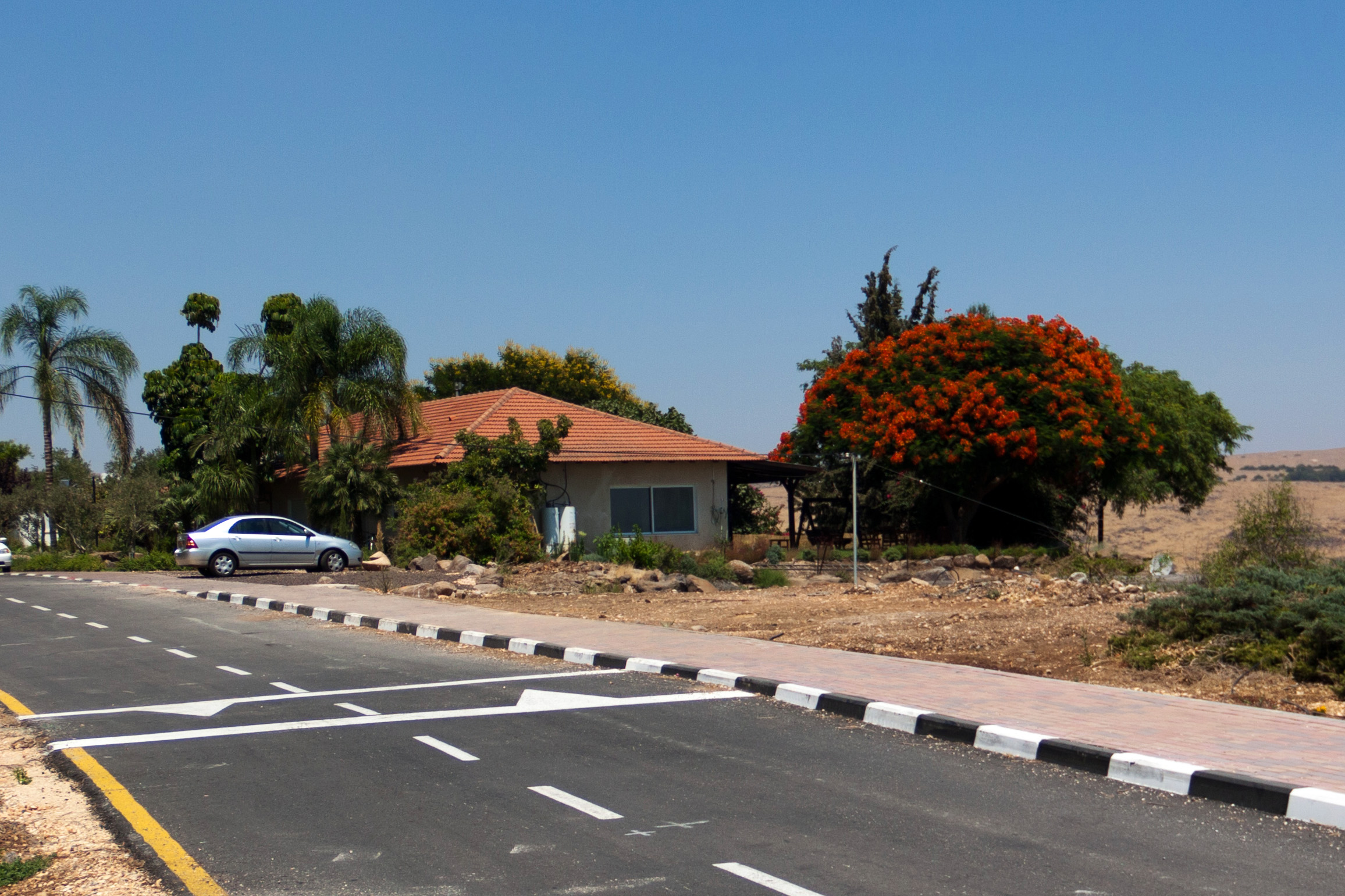

- Location within Northeast Israel Location within Israel
- Coordinates: 32°54′37″N 35°33′3″E
- Country: Israel
- District: Northern
- Subdistrict: Safed
- Council: Mevo'ot HaHermon
- Affiliation: Hitahdut HaIkarim
- Founded: 1983
- Population (2024): 518
- Website: www.korazim.co.il

Korazim (Hebrew: כורזים) is a community settlement in northern Israel. Located on the Korazim plateau to the north of the Sea of Galilee, it falls under the jurisdiction of Mevo'ot HaHermon Regional Council. In 2024 it had a population of 518.

== History ==
The village was founded in 1983 as a moshav, but after it merged with Ma'of it became a community settlement. It is found just north of the Sea of Galilee. It is named after ancient Chorazin, mentioned in the New Testament (Matthew 11:21), now the site of a much-visited archaeological park, which is located about 1 km east of the modern village.

It was founded on the land of the depopulated Palestinian village of Al-Samakiyya.

== See also ==
- Chorazin
