= Al-Butayha =

Al-Butayha البطيحة
- Village
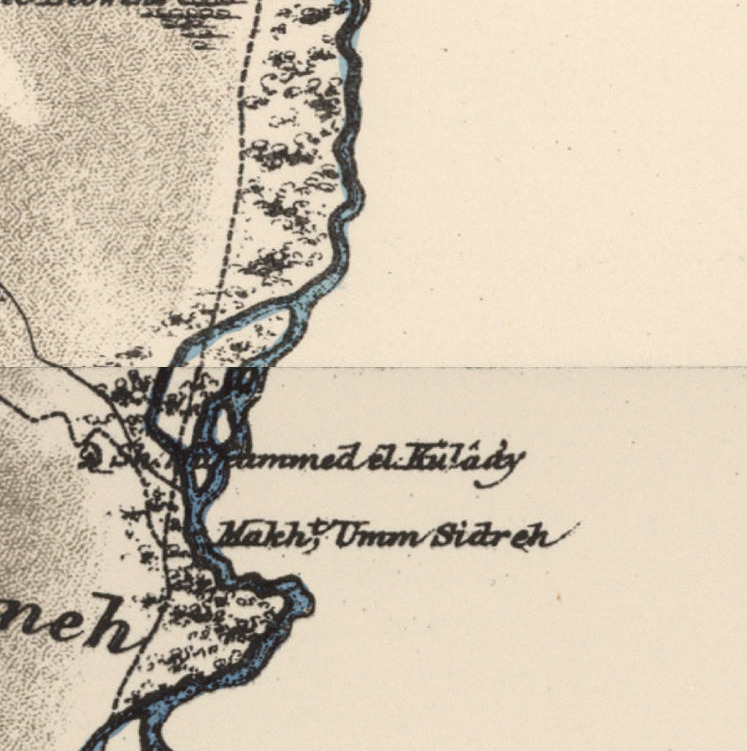
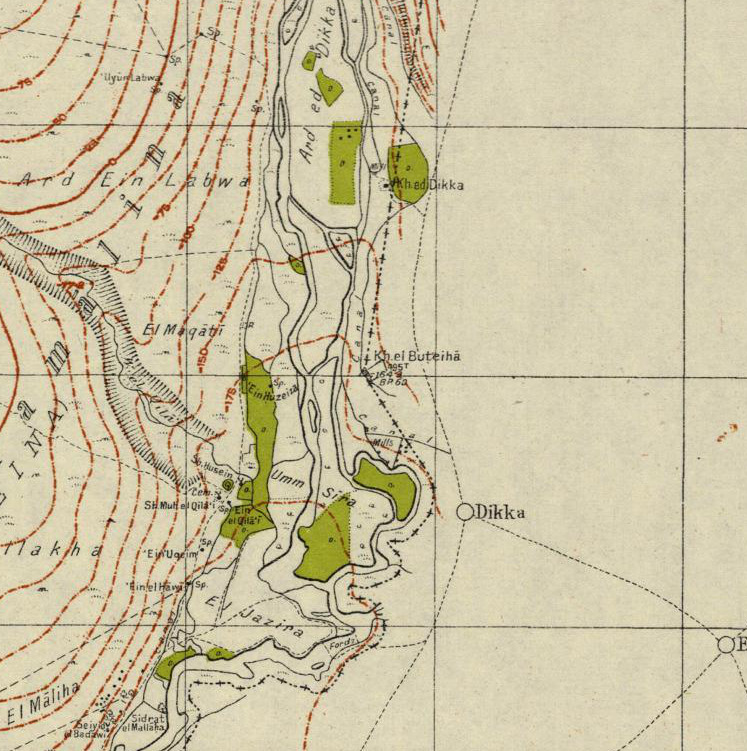
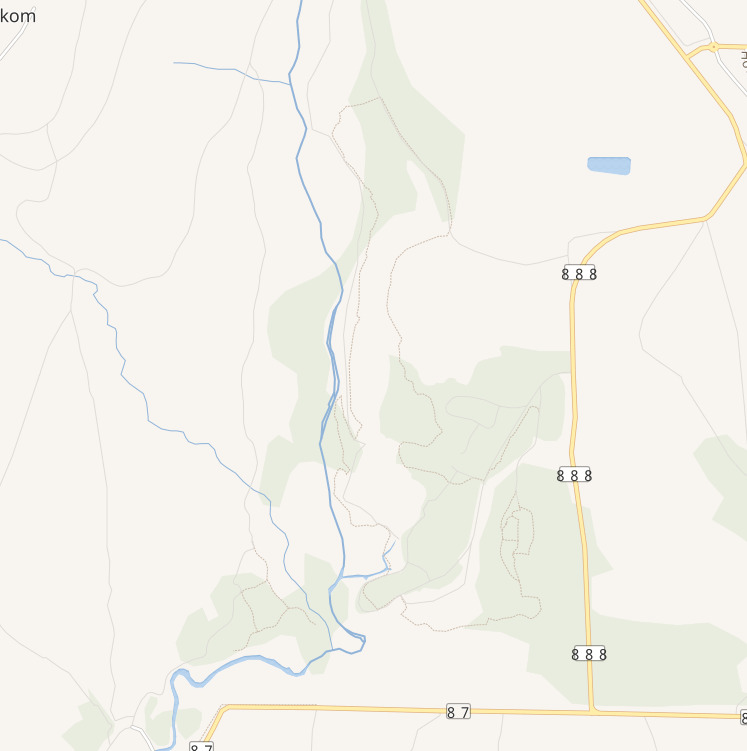
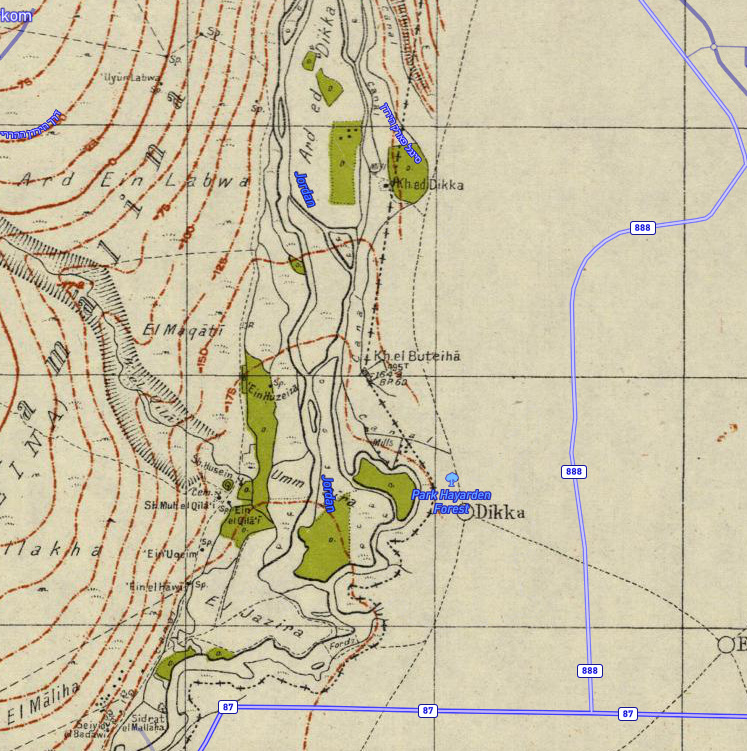
- 1870s map 1940s map modern map 1940s with modern overlay map A series of historical maps of the area around Al-Butayha (click the buttons)

- Location within Mandatory Palestine
- Coordinates: 32°54′59″N 35°37′28″E
- Palestine grid: 208/257
- Geopolitical entity: Mandatory Palestine
- Subdistrict: Safad
- Date of depopulation: May 4, 1948

Area
  - Total: 16,690 dunams (16.69 km^{2}; 6.44 sq mi)

Population (1945)
  - Total: 650
- Current Localities: Almagor

Al-Butayha (Arabic: البطيحة) was a Palestinian Arab village in the Safad Subdistrict. It was depopulated during the 1947–1948 Civil War in Mandatory Palestine on May 4, 1948, by the Palmach's First Battalion during Operation Matateh. It was located 13 km southeast of Safad, quarter of a mile east of the Jordan River, a little northeast of the northern tip of the Sea of Galilee. Many of the inhabitants were forced into Syria.

== History ==
Al-Butayha was located close the Syrian border. The name means "marshland" in Arabic, in reference to the vast stretch of land in the area. In 1459 the village was visited by the Arab geographer al-Qalqashandi.

=== British Mandate era ===
It was classified as a hamlet by the Palestine Index Gazetteer.

In the 1944/45 statistics the village was counted with Arab al-Shamalina, and together they had 650 Muslim inhabitants, with a land area of 16,690 dunums, with 3,842 dunums allocated to cereal farming, 238 dunums under irrigation or used for orchards, while 12,610 dunams were classified as non-cultivable land.

=== 1948, and aftermath ===
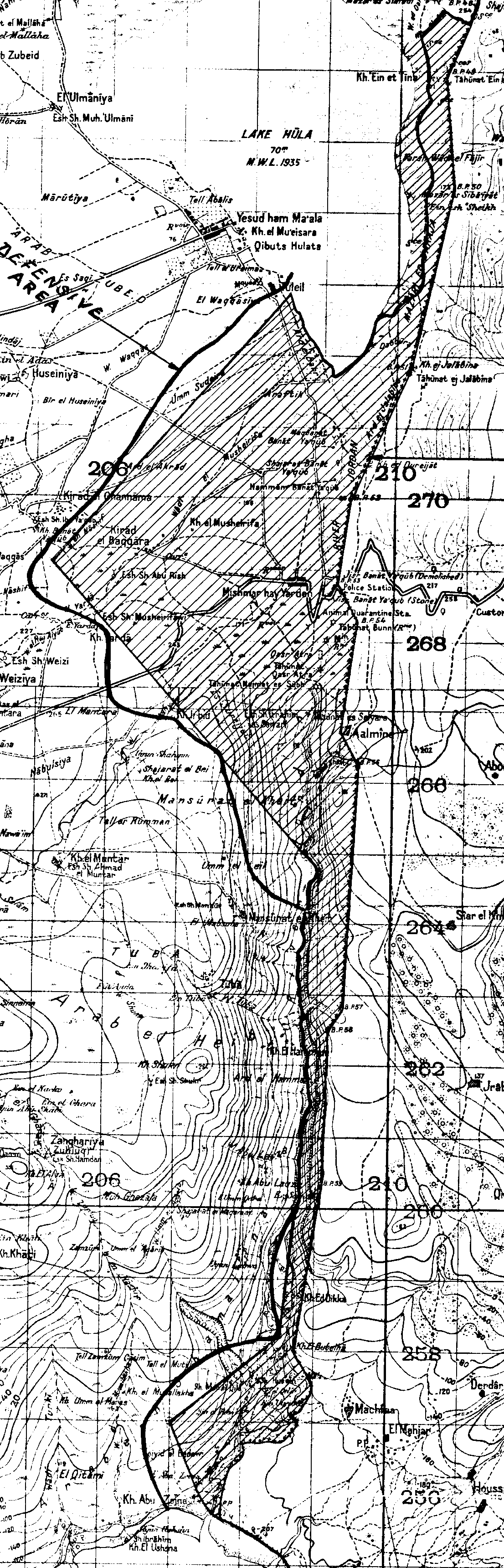
The village was in the Demilitarized Zone, per the Israel–Syria Mixed Armistice Commission.

On May 4, 1948, the village was attacked by Haganahs during Operation Matateh ('Operation Broom'), part of Operation Yiftach. Their orders were to "destroy any points of assembly for invading forces from the east”.

The Palmach's first Battalion, in addition to units from the Alexandroni Brigade and local Haganah troops, started with firing mortar rounds against the villages, then proceeded to burn down them down. A report stated they "blew up most of the houses and burned the tents of Kedar", between Tabgha and Buheita. Some 15 Arabs were killed, and the rest fled to Syria. According to Israeli historian Benny Morris, Operation Matateh resulted in 2000 Arabs all fleeing across the border to Syria.

== Today ==
The village was razed in 1948. Some of the cultivated trees such as olives and palms still grow among the ruined houses. Today the village lands are occupied by the settlement of Almagor, which was established in 1961. A popular picnicking spot, Park ha-Yarden ("Jordan River Park"), is 200 metres south of the site.

== Bibliography ==
- Department of Statistics (1945). Village Statistics, April, 1945. Government of Palestine.
- Hadawi, S. (1970). Village Statistics of 1945: A Classification of Land and Area ownership in Palestine. Palestine Liberation Organization Research Center. Archived from the original on 2018-12-08.
- Khalidi, W. (1992). All That Remains:The Palestinian Villages Occupied and Depopulated by Israel in 1948. Washington D.C.: Institute for Palestine Studies. ISBN 0-88728-224-5.
- Morris, B. (2004). The Birth of the Palestinian Refugee Problem Revisited. Cambridge University Press. ISBN 978-0-521-00967-6.
