= Khan al-Duwayr =

Khan al-Duwayr خان الدوير
- Village
- Etymology: Khân ed Duweir, the caravanserai of the little convent or circle
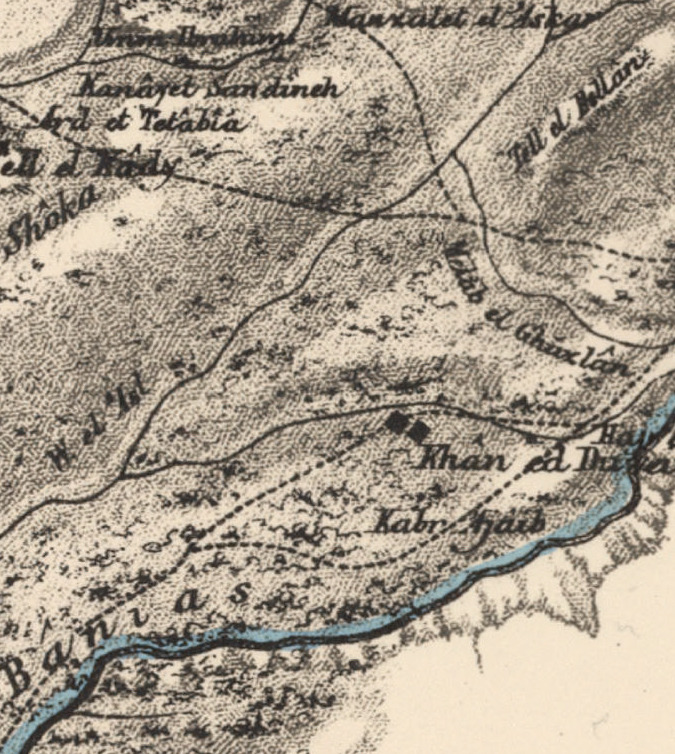
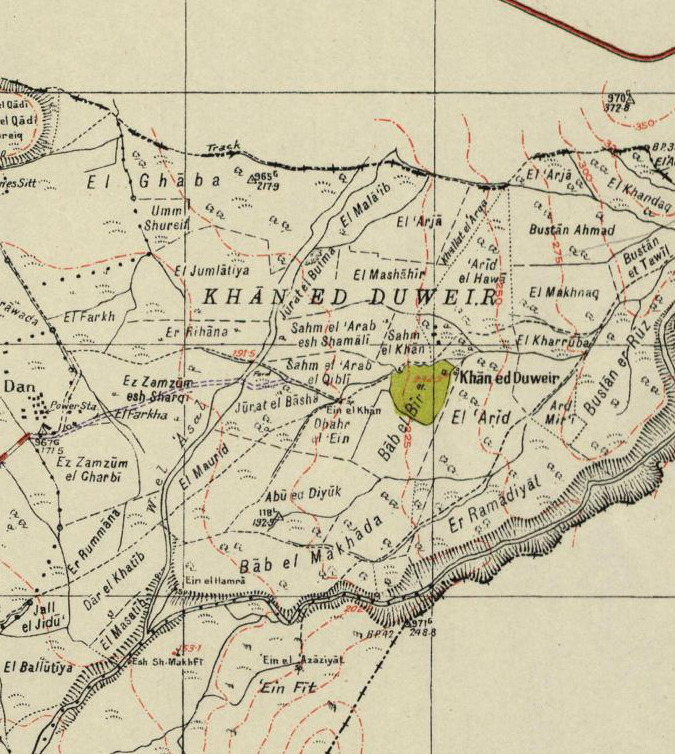
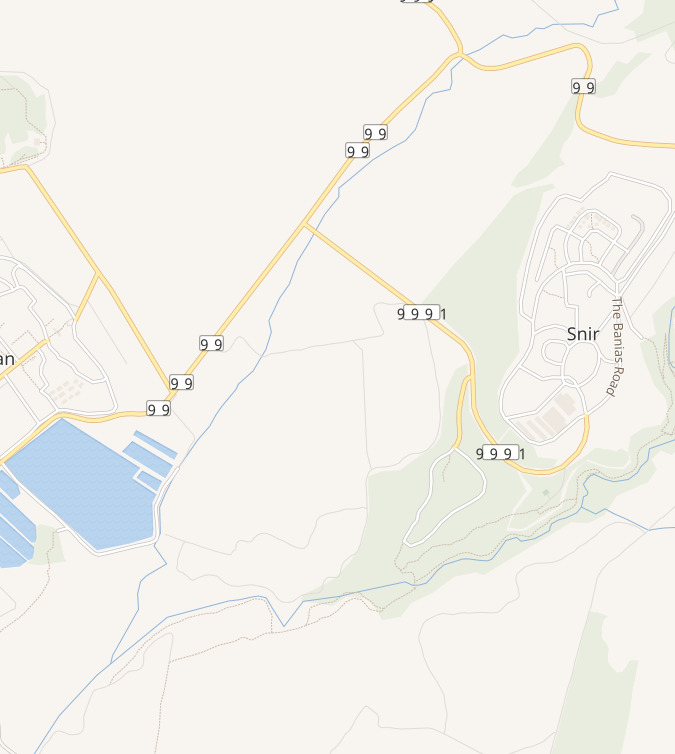
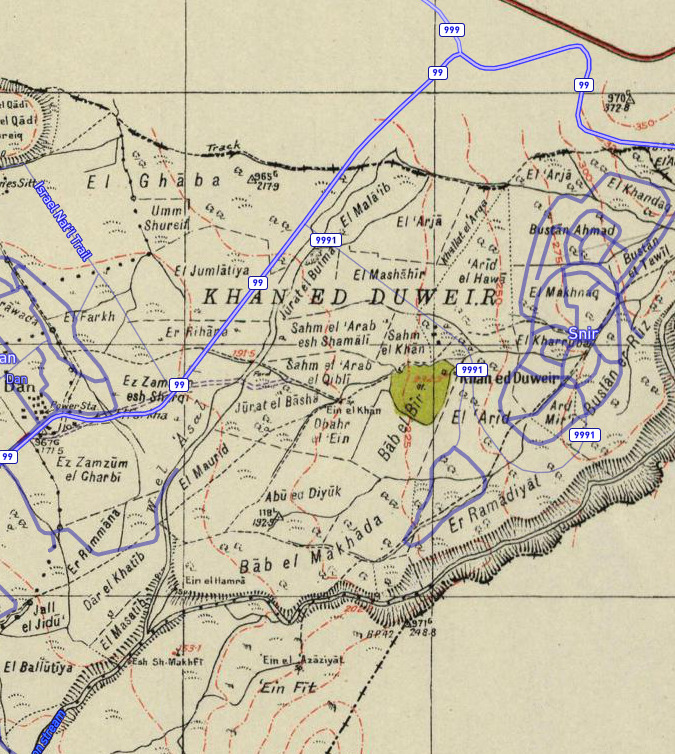
- 1870s map 1940s map modern map 1940s with modern overlay map A series of historical maps of the area around Khan al-Duwayr (click the buttons)

- Location within Mandatory Palestine
- Coordinates: 33°14′22″N 35°40′19″E
- Palestine grid: 213/293
- Geopolitical entity: Mandatory Palestine
- Subdistrict: Safad
- Date of depopulation: Not known

Population (1931)
  - Total: 137

Khan al-Duwayr (Arabic: خان الدوير) was a Palestinian Arab village in the Safad Subdistrict. It was depopulated during the 1948 Arab-Israeli War on May 30, 1948, by the Palmach's First Battalion of Operation Yiftach. It was located 35 km northeast of Safad. The ruins of the village were overbuilt by the Israeli kibbutz of Snir.

== History ==
=== Ancient Laish/Dan ===
The village had a khirbat named Tall al-Qadi, which lay about 1 km to the northwest of the village. Tell el-Qadi has been identified as the site of the biblical city of Laish/Dan since the mid-19th century. Excavations at Tell el-Qadi/Tel Dan have brought to light substantial remains from the Early Bronze Age through Iron Age IIB, when Dan was destroyed by Tiglath-Pileser III in 733/2 BCE, and with continued occupation and/or cultic activities through to the Roman period.

=== Ottoman period ===
In 1875 Victor Guérin noted it as a hamlet called Khan Doueir. A small wood of oaks and terebinths grew close to it.

In 1881 the PEF's Survey of Western Palestine described Khan ed Duweir as: "Two stone houses here contain about twenty Moslems; situated on slope of hill near the stream of water, with olives and arable cultivation around."

=== British Mandate ===
In the 1931 census of Palestine conducted by the British Mandate authorities, the population of Khan ed-Duwair was 137, all Muslims, in a total of 29 houses.

In the 1945 statistics no Arabs were listed as inhabitants, while the nearby Dan had a population of 260, and Arabs still owned 2,163 dunams of the land. Of this, they used 2,067 for plantations and irrigable land, while 96 were used for cereals.

=== 1948, aftermath ===
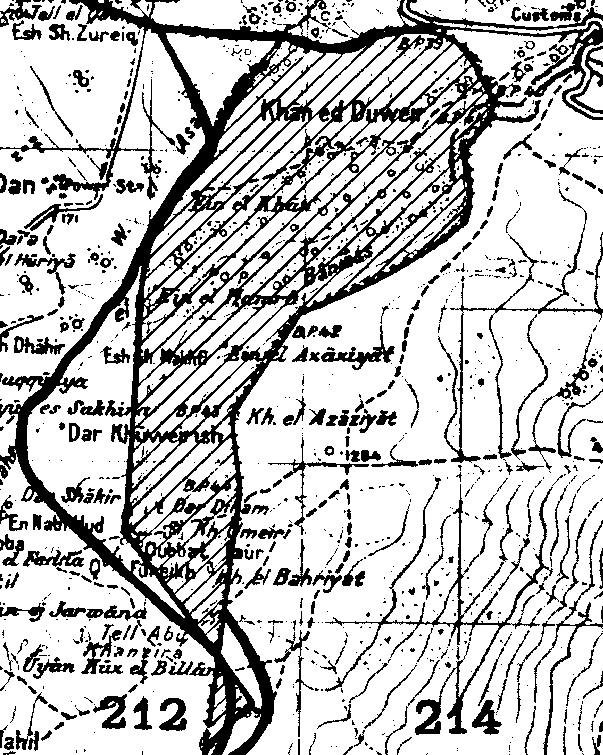
Khan al-Duwayr Demilitarized Zone, per the Israel–Syria Mixed Armistice Commission.

On 12 April 1948, prior to the outbreak of the 1948 Arab-Israeli war, Israel Galili wrote to Yosef Weitz recommending that new settlements be established at the site of a number of Arab villages, including Khan al-Duwayr, 'as soon as possible'. Norman Finkelstein, quoting Benny Morris, notes this recommendation was made even though most of the sites had not yet been depopulated.

On the 22 April, 1948, Haganah command agreed to provide the manpower to set up settlements on non−Arab land in several Arab villages; one of the villages mentioned was Khan al-Duwayr.

According to the Israel–Syria Mixed Armistice Commission, Khan al-Duwayr was part of the DM after the 1948 war. Israel, however, gradually managed to evict all the Arab inhabitants of the DM zone, using a "stick and carrot" method.

Dafna is located about 3 km southwest of the Khan al-Duwayr site, while Dan 2 km to the west of the site: neither is on village land.

In 1992 the village site was described: "The site is deserted, overgrown with grass. Only the ruins of a khan (caravansary) are visible. The surrounding land is either cultivated by Israelis, or used as forest or pasture."

== Bibliography ==
- Conder, C.R.; Kitchener, H.H. (1881). The Survey of Western Palestine: Memoirs of the Topography, Orography, Hydrography, and Archaeology. Vol. 1. London: Committee of the Palestine Exploration Fund.
- Finkelstein, N. (2003). Image and reality of the Israel-Palestine conflict (2nd, revised ed.). Verso. ISBN 1-85984-442-1.
- Government of Palestine, Department of Statistics (1945). Village Statistics, April, 1945.
- Guérin, V. (1880). Description Géographique Historique et Archéologique de la Palestine (in French). Vol. 3: Galilee, pt. 2. Paris: L'Imprimerie Nationale.
- Hadawi, S. (1970). Village Statistics of 1945: A Classification of Land and Area ownership in Palestine. Palestine Liberation Organization Research Center. Archived from the original on 2018-12-08.
- Khalidi, W. (1992). All That Remains: The Palestinian Villages Occupied and Depopulated by Israel in 1948. Washington D.C.: Institute for Palestine Studies. ISBN 0-88728-224-5.
- Mills, E., ed. (1932). Census of Palestine 1931. Population of Villages, Towns and Administrative Areas. Jerusalem: Government of Palestine.
- Morris, B. (2004). The Birth of the Palestinian Refugee Problem Revisited. Cambridge University Press. ISBN 978-0-521-00967-6.
- Palmer, E.H. (1881). The Survey of Western Palestine: Arabic and English Name Lists Collected During the Survey by Lieutenants Conder and Kitchener, R. E. Transliterated and Explained by E.H. Palmer. Committee of the Palestine Exploration Fund.
