= Irma Wolpe Rademacher =

American pianist and piano teacher

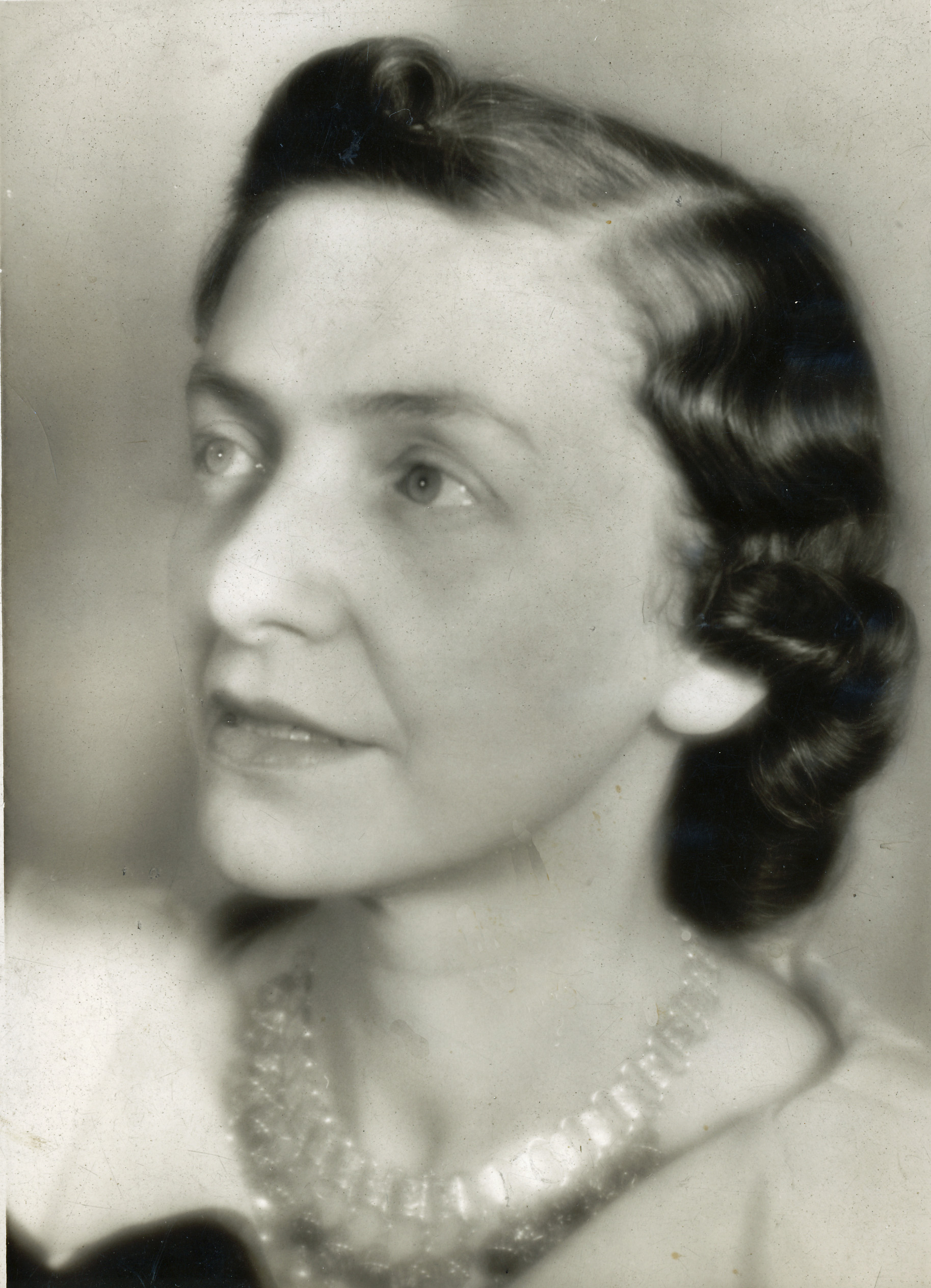
Irma Wolpe, ca. 1940

Irma Wolpe Rademacher (March 15, 1902 – January 6, 1984), née Schoenberg, was a Romanian-born American pianist and teacher.

== Life and career ==
She was born in 1902 in Galați, Western Moldavia, Romania, into a bourgeois Jewish family, the third of four children. In 1910 the family moved to Iași (Jassy), where her father, Jacob Schoenberg (1864–1930), was offered the position of vice president with the newly formed Banca Moldova. Her mother, Rachel Schoenberg née Segall (1879–1943), conversant in many languages, was a gifted essayist and poet. Both parents were Zionists and eminently active in the Jewish community life. They were closely connected with leading Zionists, including the presidents of the World Zionist Organization Chaim Weizmann and Nahum Sokolow. Rachel Schoenberg was a member of the Women's International Zionist Organization and a sought-after speaker at its European congresses. Jacob and Rachel Schoenberg were engaged in establishing agricultural stations for training Jewish adolescents to become farmers at settlements in Palestine, especially at the Ness Ziona colony.

All four Schoenberg children had excellent educations. The eldest, Harry (later Henry Ray), graduated from the Technische Hochschule (now Technical University of Munich, and practised architecture and commercial design in Bucharest before emigrating to the US in 1939. Elsa studied at the Applied Arts School (now Dresden Academy of Fine Arts) before marrying Samuel Ussishkin, son of Zionist Menachem Ussishkin, in 1926 and moving to Jerusalem. The youngest, Isaac Jacob (Iso) Schoenberg studied mathematics in Iași, Göttingen, and Berlin. After his marriage in 1930 to Dolli Landau, daughter of mathematician Edmund Landau and granddaughter of Paul Ehrlich, they emigrated to the US, where he built an academic career noted for his fundamental work on Splines.

Irma was a graduate of the piano class of Enrico Mezzetti at the Conservatory in Iași (now Universitatea Națională de Arte "George Enescu"]). She then studied for a year with Hermann Vetter at the Conservatory for Music and Theatre in Dresden (now Hochschule für Musik Carl Maria von Weber). Between 1921 and 1924 she was a piano student of Leonid Kreutzer and Elsa Rompe in Berlin and attended the rhythmical courses of the Dalcroze School.

In 1924 she moved to Paris, where she studied piano for two years with Alfred Cortot, and rhythmics and improvisation at the Eurythmic Seminar of Émile Jaques-Dalcroze. She graduated as a rhythmist from the Institute Jaques-Dalcroze in Geneva in 1927. Most of her time thereafter until 1933 she lived in Berlin, where she taught at the private piano school of Elsa Rompe and at the Schule für Rhythmus, Musik und Körperbildung of Anna Epping and Marie Adama van Scheltema. Having met the German-Jewish composer Stefan Wolpe (1902–1972), she performed his compositions in her concerts, and also in some concerts of the November Group.

Before 1932 her performances were mainly in Romania and British Mandate Palestine. Marc Chagall, whom she met in Jerusalem, was instrumental in organizing her Paris debut in January 1932 at the Salle Pleyel. This marked also the first performance of three of Stefan Wolpe's Cinque marches caractéristiques (1928–1934). Thereafter Stefan Wolpe dedicated his piano compositions to Irma.

In 1933, after the National Socialist takeover in Germany, Irma Schoenberg helped Stefan Wolpe, threatened as a Jewish communist and avant-garde composer, to flee Berlin. His first station was Czechoslovakia, afterwards they both fled via Switzerland, Austria, and Romania, before arriving 1934 to British Mandate Palestine, where they were married. Irma Wolpe played concerts and taught piano at the Palestine Conservatoire (now Jerusalem Academy of Music and Dance) until 1938, when they emigrated to the US.

For the rest of her life, New York City was her permanent residence and professional base, although she taught as well at the Settlement Music School in Philadelphia, at Swarthmore College, and later at the New England Conservatory of Music in Boston.

She was an active pianist, giving many solo concerts. She also played in chamber music concerts with Rudolph Benetsky, Herbert Brün, Arline Carmen, Eli Friedman, Emil Hauser, Anne Hirsch-Fellheimer, Hanoch Jacoby, the Jerusalem String Quartet, Josef Marx, Abraham Mishkind, Anneliese von Molnar, Sascha Parnes, Nora Post, Eduard Steuermann, Joachim Stutschewsky, Alfred Swan, Jani Szántó, Josef Tal and Thelma Yellin-Bentwich, among others.

In 1949 she divorced Stefan Wolpe and married the mathematician Hans Rademacher (1892–1969). During a yearlong stay in Bombay (now Mumbai) (1954–1955), where Rademacher taught at the Tata Institute for Fundamental Research, she played in concerts together with Mehli Mehta and his Quartet, and had improvisation sessions with Vilayat Khan, the Sitar virtuoso.

After Hans Rademacher’s death, she returned to piano teaching, and finished her pianistic career as a professor at the New England Conservatory in Boston with two remarkable solo recitals: In 1973 she performed an all Arnold Schoenberg program, and in 1975, in an homage to Stefan Wolpe, her first husband and lifelong musician-friend, she performed the first-ever all Wolpe piano concert. Irma Wolpe Rademacher was the most important performer of Stefan Wolpe's piano compositions. Her students David Tudor and Jacob Maxin carried on this legacy. Wolpe Rademacher died in New York City, aged 81.

In more than 100 concerts, she mastered a wide repertory with emphasis on the music of the 20th century. As a teacher and mentor she inspired and promoted the careers of many musicians, including: Leonard Battipaglia, Louise Costigan-Kerns, Eric Kamen, Lily Friedman, Anezia Garcia, Laura Gigante Sharpe, Susan Kagan, Peter Jona Korn, Jerome Lowenthal, Jacob Maxin, Garrick Ohlsson, Benjamin Oren, Zaidee Parkinson, Donald Pirone, Elizabeth Rich, Sonia Rubinsky, Krista Seddon, Peter Serkin, Russell Sherman, Thomas Stumpf, David Tudor, Meira Warshauer, and Konrad Wolff. Having viewed piano technique as an art of movement, Irma Wolpe Rademacher developed a most personal approach in her teaching, emphasizing that "music is the sound of motion".

== Publications ==
- Irma Wolpe Rademacher: Comments on L'Art de toucher le piano, in: Piano Journal, EPTA, London, 1981, pp. 15–20.

== Recordings ==
- Radio Bucharest; Palestine Broadcasting Service (Kol Yerushalayim), Jerusalem; Radio Bombay, India; New England Conservatory, Boston.
