= Al-Zuq al-Tahtani =

Al-Zuq al-Tahtani الزوق التحتاني
- Village
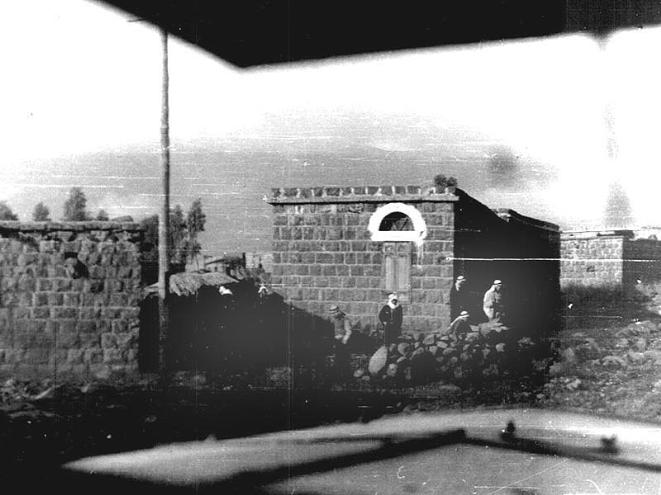
- Residents of al-Zuk al-Tahtani seen from a Palmach convoy. 1947.
- Etymology: the lower Zuk (Zuk is a Syriac word meaning "town", or "village")
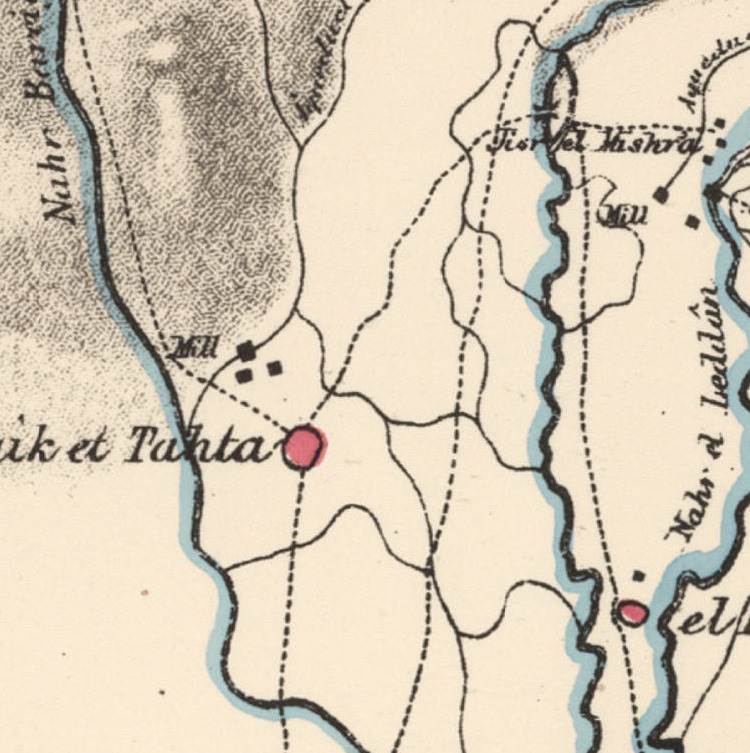
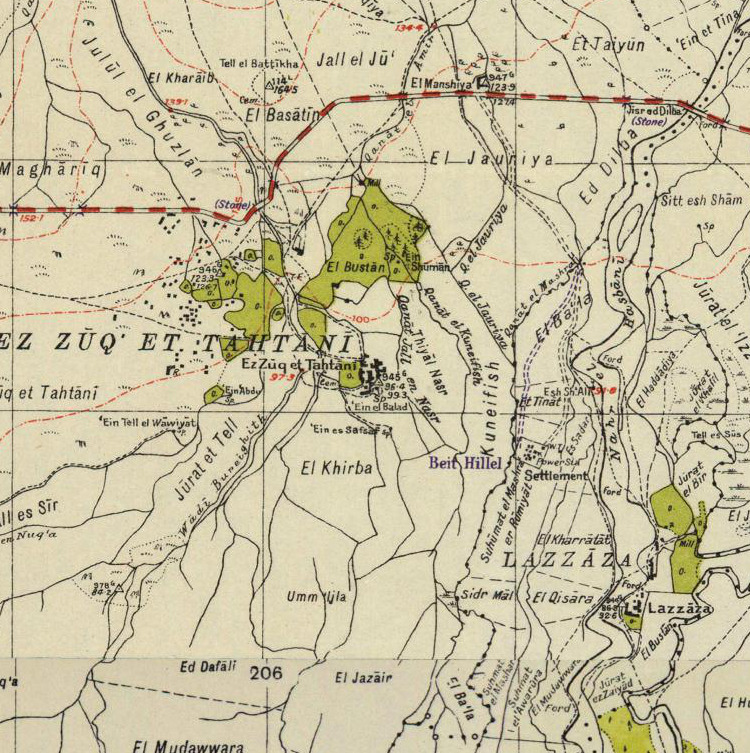
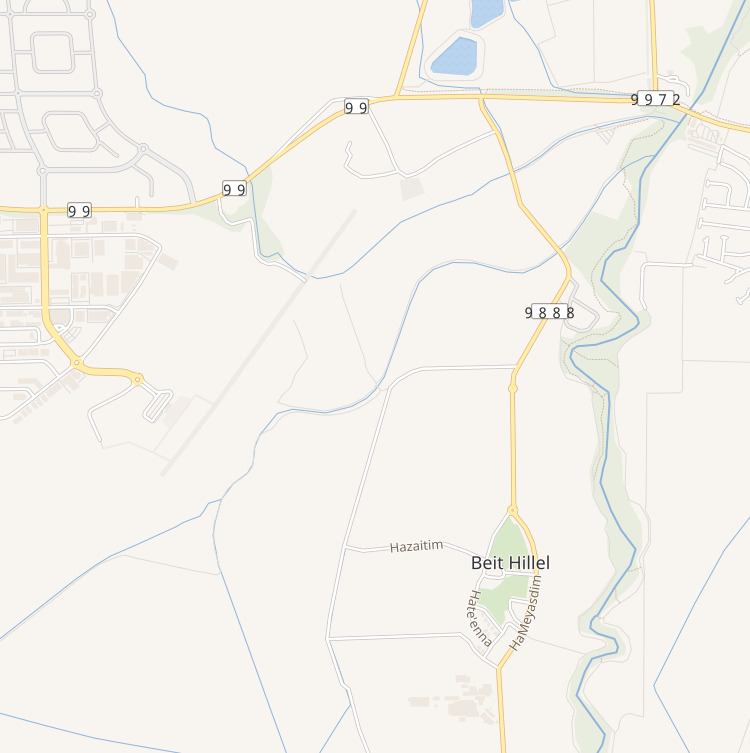
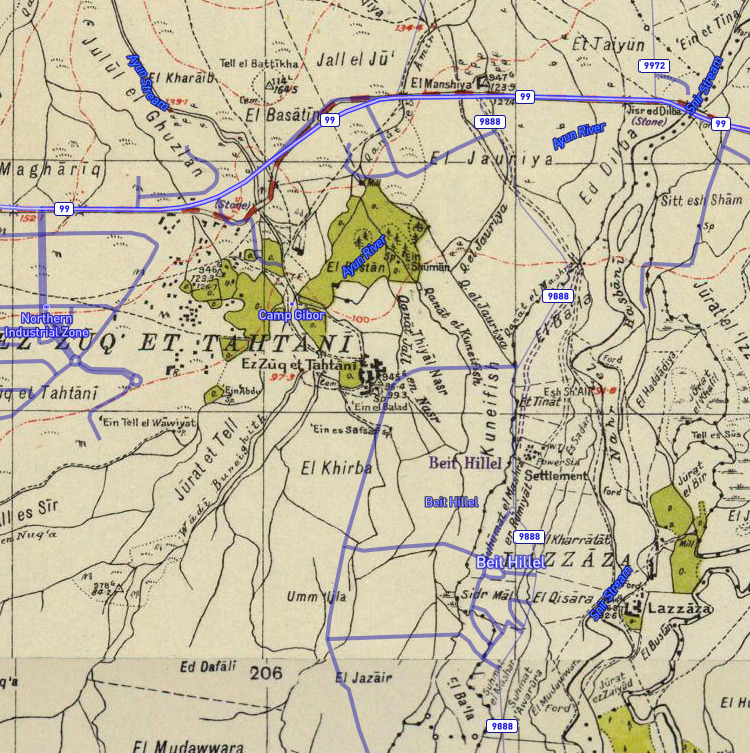
- 1870s map 1940s map modern map 1940s with modern overlay map A series of historical maps of the area around Al-Zuq al-Tahtani (click the buttons)

- Location within Mandatory Palestine
- Coordinates: 33°12′54″N 35°36′04″E
- Palestine grid: 205/291
- Geopolitical entity: Mandatory Palestine
- Subdistrict: Safad
- Date of depopulation: May 11, 1948

Area
  - Total: 11,634 dunams (11.634 km^{2}; 4.492 sq mi)

Population (1948)
  - Total: 1,050
- Cause(s) of depopulation: Influence of nearby town's fall
- Current Localities: Beyt Hillel

Al-Zuq al-Tahtani was a Palestinian Arab village in the Safad Subdistrict. It was depopulated during the 1947–1948 Civil War in Mandatory Palestine on May 11, 1948, by the Palmach's First Battalion of Operation Yiftach. It was located 30 km northeast of Safad.

== History ==
In historical sources, the name "al-Zuq" initially referred specifically to the area now known as Al-Zuq al-Tahtani, located several kilometers south of Al-Zuq al-Fawqani. Over time, the name was gradually extended northward and began to apply to the adjacent village as well. This shift in toponymic usage is evident in 19th-century geographic records, including works by Edward Robinson, the French military map compiled by Charles Gélis, and the Survey of Western Palestine. Researchers have noted that this kind of name transfer between neighboring locations is a recognized feature of Palestinian toponymy.

In 1875, Victor Guérin noted it south of Al-Zuq al-Fawqani, but with lesser important ruins. In 1881, the PEF's Survey of Western Palestine described Zuk et Tahta: "Stone and mud village, with ruined Arab houses on north side, and a mill; contains about 100 Moslems; situated on the Huleh Plain; arable land around, and a large stream near".

=== British Mandate era ===
In the 1931 census of Palestine, conducted by the British Mandate authorities, Al-Zuq al-Tahtani had a population of 626 Muslims, in a total of 137 houses.

In the 1945 statistics, the village had a total population of 1,050 Muslims, with a total of 11,634 dunams of land, according to an official land and population survey. Of this, Arabs used 5,547 for plantations and irrigable land, 2,145 dunums were for cereals; while a 39 dunams were classified as built-up, urban areas.

=== 1948, aftermath ===
It became depopulated on May 11, 1948, in the aftermath of Operation Broom.

In 1950 the re-established Beyt Hillel was expanded to include Al-Zuq al-Tahtani land.

== Bibliography ==
- Conder, C.R.; Kitchener, H.H. (1881). The Survey of Western Palestine: Memoirs of the Topography, Orography, Hydrography, and Archaeology. Vol. 1. London: Committee of the Palestine Exploration Fund.
- Department of Statistics (1945). Village Statistics, April, 1945. Government of Palestine.
- Guérin, V. (1880). Description Géographique Historique et Archéologique de la Palestine (in French). Vol. 3: Galilee, pt. 2. Paris: L'Imprimerie Nationale.
- Hadawi, S. (1970). Village Statistics of 1945: A Classification of Land and Area ownership in Palestine. Palestine Liberation Organization Research Center. Archived from the original on 2018-12-08.
- Khalidi, W. (1992). All That Remains: The Palestinian Villages Occupied and Depopulated by Israel in 1948. Washington D.C.: Institute for Palestine Studies. ISBN 0-88728-224-5.
- Mills, E., ed. (1932). Census of Palestine 1931. Population of Villages, Towns and Administrative Areas. Jerusalem: Government of Palestine.
- Morris, B. (2004). The Birth of the Palestinian Refugee Problem Revisited. Cambridge University Press. ISBN 978-0-521-00967-6.
- Palmer, E.H. (1881). The Survey of Western Palestine: Arabic and English Name Lists Collected During the Survey by Lieutenants Conder and Kitchener, R. E. Transliterated and Explained by E.H. Palmer. Committee of the Palestine Exploration Fund.
