= Yona Tepper =

Israeli writer (born 1941)

- יונה טפר
- Born: 25 February 1941 (age 85); Dafna, Mandatory Palestine (now Dafna, Israel)
- Occupation: Author

Yona Tepper (Hebrew: יונה טפר; born 25 February 1941) is an Israeli writer.

== Biography ==
Tepper was born on 25 February 1941, in the kibbutz of Dafna. After her marriage she moved to the kibbutz of Yagur. She studied pedagogy and creative drama. She worked in a kindergarten, taught for many years and then became a school principal. After that she was a publisher and editor for children's and young adult literature at Hakibbutz Hameuchad Publishing House for about twenty years.

As a writer, Tepper specializes in children's and young adult books; her bibliography includes 18 young adult books, 9 children's books and 29 picture books for children. Some of her books have been translated into Arabic, German, English, Korean and Spanish. In none of her books does she offer a solution to the problems addressed, which many children resent. She explained: "I can neither solve the Intifada problem nor prevent emigration, nor the death of the mother who is suffering from cancer. There is no solution, that's life."

Tepper is married to the historian Yigal Tepper. One of her four children is archaeologist Yotam Tepper, born in 1967.

== Works ==
In the book When are you coming back?, Tepper describes life plans, utopias and disappointments in a kibbutz based on a family history that spans three generations. Hudi left the family after military service and emigrated to the United States. Nitzan cannot imagine leaving Israel and embodies the opposing position in the younger generation. When Hudi comes to visit but makes it clear that he will not stay, a fierce confrontation of the different views ensues. Among other things, the ideals of the grandparent generation who founded the kibbutz are shaken.

The book David Half and Half tells the story of twelve-year-old David, who is despised by the other children in the kibbutz with the nickname "Half-and-Half". he alludes to the fact that although his father is Jewish, his mother Elli is a Christian from Norway who is treated as an outsider in the kibbutz. David is provoked by his classmates; but when he hits back, he is branded a troublemaker. The father asks David and Elli to be patient and hopes that the prejudices will be overcome over time. But David's mother has been suffering from a lack of appreciation for fifteen years. When the kibbutz refuses to train her as a kindergarten teacher, she wants to return to Norway. David reacts partly with violence and partly with apathy. After a heated argument, the family decides to leave together. The book sparked heated debates in Israel after its publication in 1990; among other things, it was criticized that the kibbutz was being portrayed in a bad light.

The picture book Who Is Passing By? is aimed at children between the ages of about three and five. In it, little Yael looks out from the balcony of her apartment and observes what is happening below. She happily observes how objects, animals and people appear and disappear from view. She tries to guess where the people are coming from and where they are going. At the end, she sees her father among the people on the street and takes a walk with him through the city. Specific questions contribute to the liveliness of the text, for example: "Who made that noise?"

== Bibliography (selected) ==
- Wann kommst du zurück?, translated from Hebrew by Miriam Magall, Alibaba Verlag, Frankfurt 1992
- David halb und halb, translated by Iris Elkabets-Rosen, Alibaba Verlag, Frankfurt 1993
- Who Is Passing By?, translated in English by Deborah Guthman, Kane & Miller, San Diego 2010

== Awards and honors ==
- 1995: Ze'ev Prize for children's and young adult literature
- 2001: Prime Minister’s Prize
- 2008: Admission to the Honour List of the International Board on Books for Young People (IBBY) for the book Small Stone of Love
- 2008: Israel Ministry of Science and Culture Award
- 2015: Devorah Omer Prize for Lifetime Achievement
