= Samuel Ussishkin =

Russian-Israeli lawyer

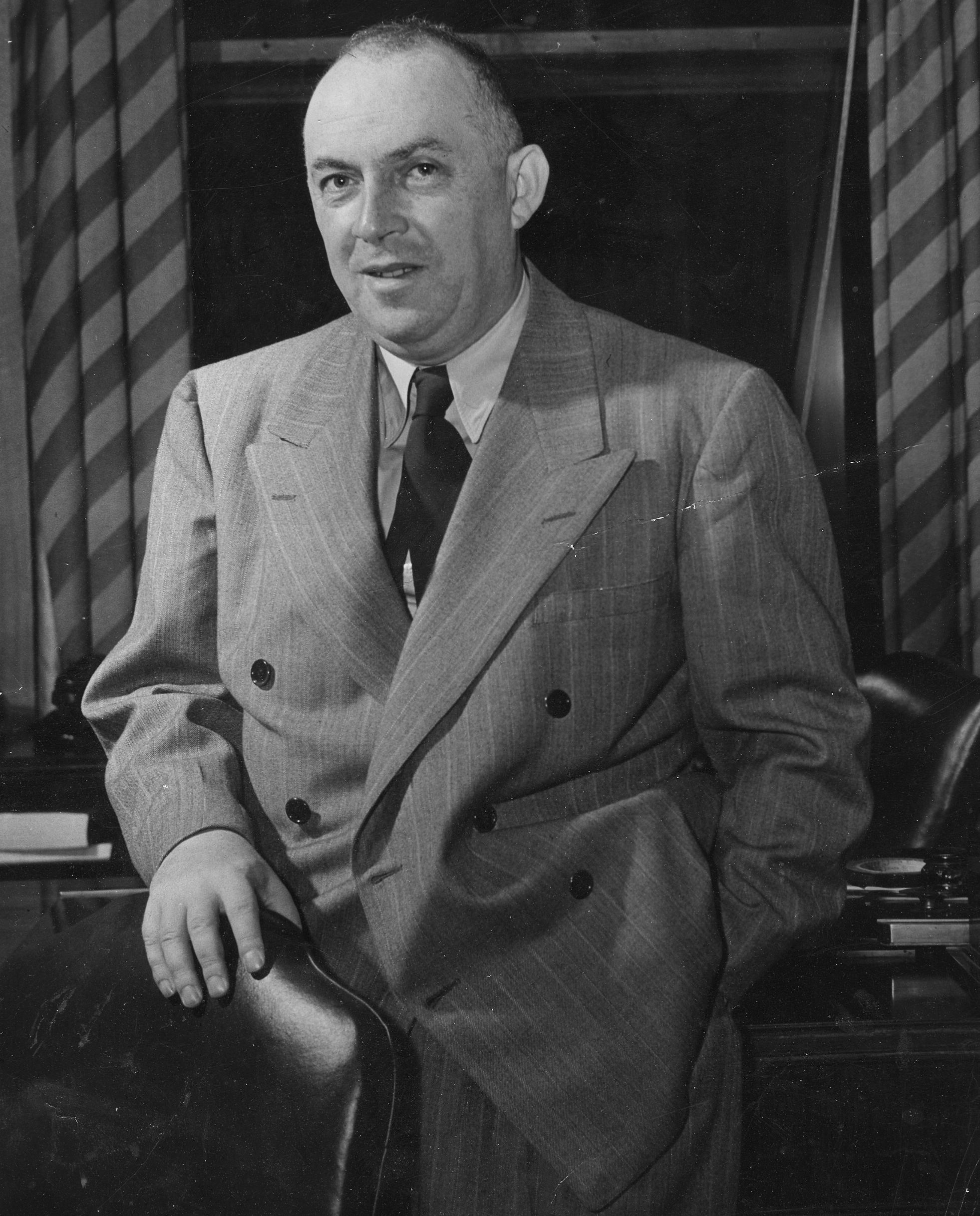
Samuel Ussishkin, c. 1947

Samuel Ussishkin (Hebrew: שמואל אוסישקין; Yekaterinoslav, 19 May 1899 – Jerusalem, 2 August 1978), was a lawyer and public figure in Mandatory Palestine and the early days of the State of Israel.

== Biography ==
Samuel Ussishkin was born in Yekaterinoslav (today Dnipro, Ukraine), on 19 May 1899, to the Zionist leader Menachem Ussishkin, and his wife Esther, née Paley. He was named Samuel after Rabbi Samuel Mohilever, pioneer of religious Zionism and the Hovevei Zion movement in Russia, who died in 1898. In 1906 the Ussishkin family moved to Odessa. Samuel completed his school years with distinction at the Jewish Rappoport Gymnasium. In 1917, he began to study medicine in the university, but at the end of the year decided to study law. In Odessa he was active in Zionist student organizations. In 1919 he and his father Menachem both left Russia for good; Menachem settled in Jerusalem, and Samuel proceeded to England. He completed his law studies in the University of Cambridge in 1922 and settled in Palestine, first in Tel Aviv and then in Jerusalem. He practiced as a lawyer, and for many years had his law office in Jerusalem.

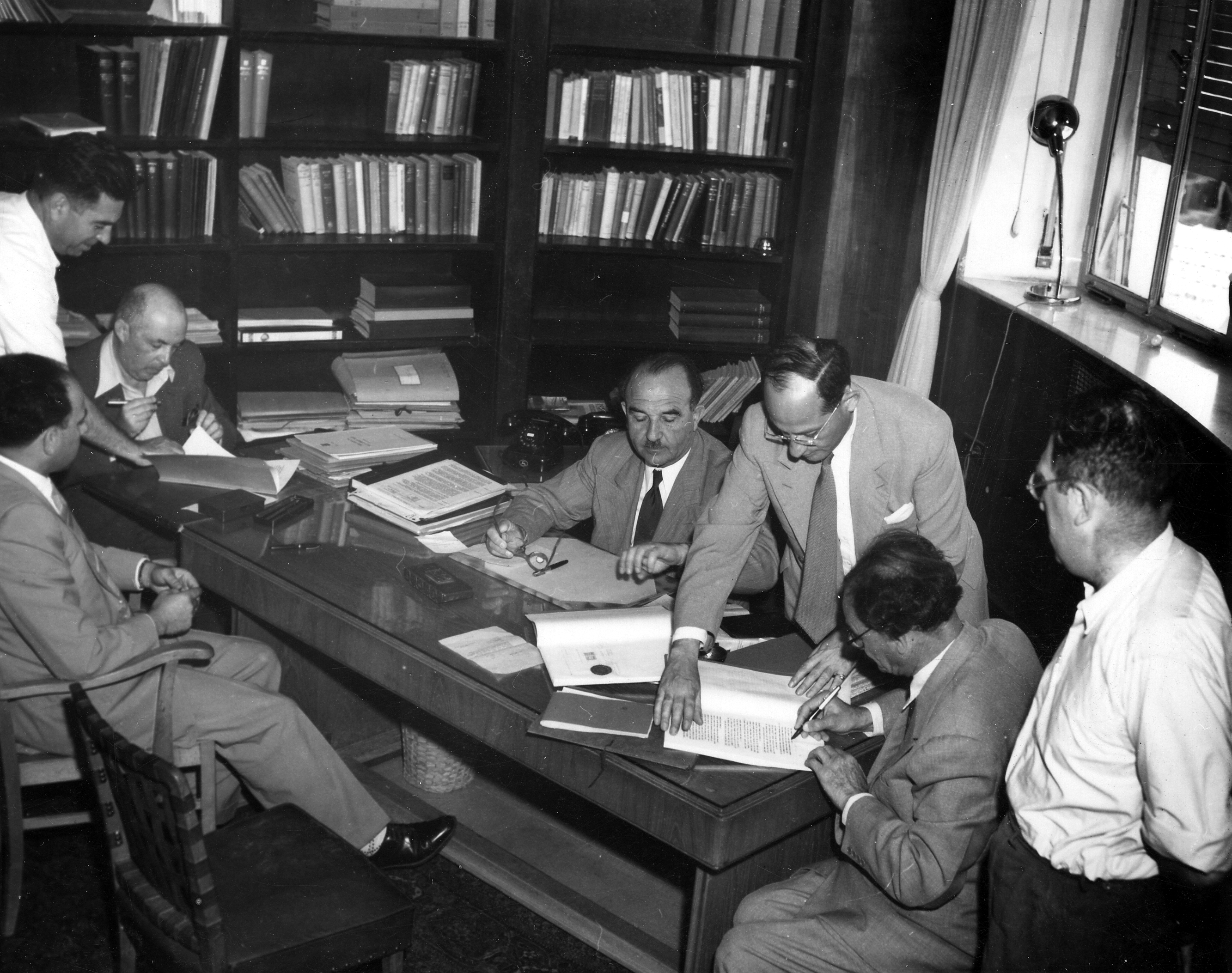
Signing of land transfer agreement with the JNF. Levi Eshkol seated at center, Ussishkin seated at the left of the picture

In 1926 Ussishkin became the legal adviser of the Jewish National Fund (JNF), and this task became a central part of his legal work till his retirement in 1969. In 1941, after the death of his father, he was elected as a member of the Board of Directors of the JNF, representing the General Zionists party. After the establishment of the State of Israel Ussishkin took a central part in the process of registering the JNF as an Israeli company and in the transactions of land between the JNF and the State of Israel.

For many years Ussishkin taught in the School of Law and Economics in Tel Aviv, which before the establishment of the State of Israel in 1948 had been the sole high institution in the country for training lawyers. He was a member of the General Zionists Party, and at certain periods was active in it. He was active in Zionist circles, and was a member of the Court of the Zionist Organization. For many years he wrote articles on current affairs in the daily newspapers Haaretz and HaBoker. He published five books in Hebrew: One book surveys the history of the Crusades and three books deal with British constitutional law. An autobiographical book dealing with Samuel’s younger days in Ukraine was published posthumously.

== Family ==
Ussishkin was married to Elsa Schoenberg from Iași, Romania, daughter of the Zionist activist Rachel Schoenberg, and sister of the pianist Irma Wolpe Rademacher and the mathematician Isaac Jacob Schoenberg. They had one son, David Ussishkin, an archaeologist.

== Books ==
- Chapters in English Constitutional Law, Jerusalem, 1927 (in Hebrew)
- West in East; History of the Crusaders in Palestine, Tel Aviv, 1931 (in Hebrew)
- Systems of Government in the British Empire Tel Aviv, 1937 (in Hebrew)
- The Political Regime in Britain, Tel Aviv, 1946 (in Hebrew)
- Mother Odessa; Memoirs, Jerusalem, 1984 (in Hebrew)
