= Snir =

Snir: שניר (Hebrew)
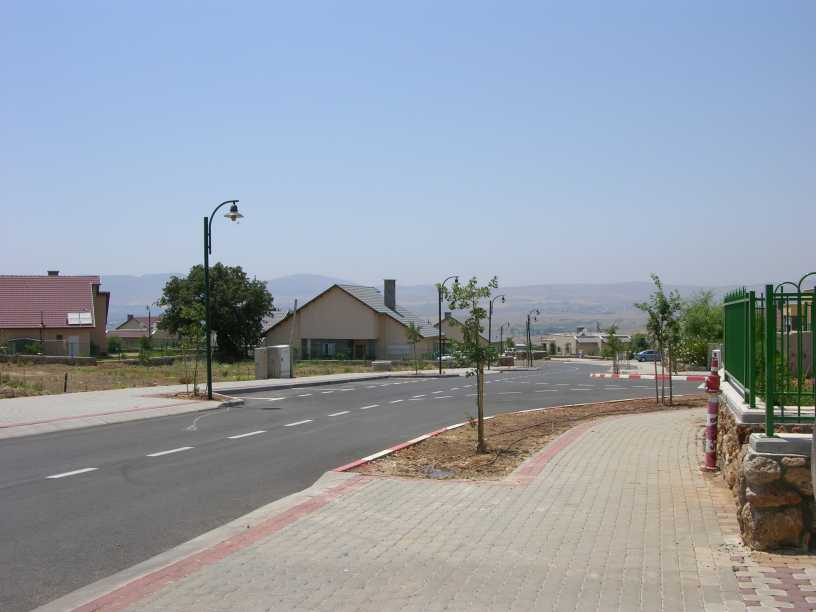

- Location within Northeast Israel Location within Israel
- Coordinates: 33°14′25″N 35°40′40″E
- Country: Israel
- District: Northern
- Subdistrict: Safed
- Council: Upper Galilee
- Affiliation: Kibbutz Movement
- Founded: 26 September 1967
- Founder: Hashomer Hatzair Nahalniks
- Population (2024): 750

Snir (Hebrew: שניר) is a kibbutz in northern Israel. Located in the Hula Valley near Kiryat Shmona, it falls under the jurisdiction of Upper Galilee Regional Council. In 2024 it had a population of 750.

== Etymology ==
The name of the kibbutz is derived from the Israeli name Nahal Snir for the Hasbani River, 5 km to the west. 'Senir' is a name used in the Hebrew Bible for Mount Hermon, which dominates the landscape from the northeast, or one of its three main peaks.

== History ==
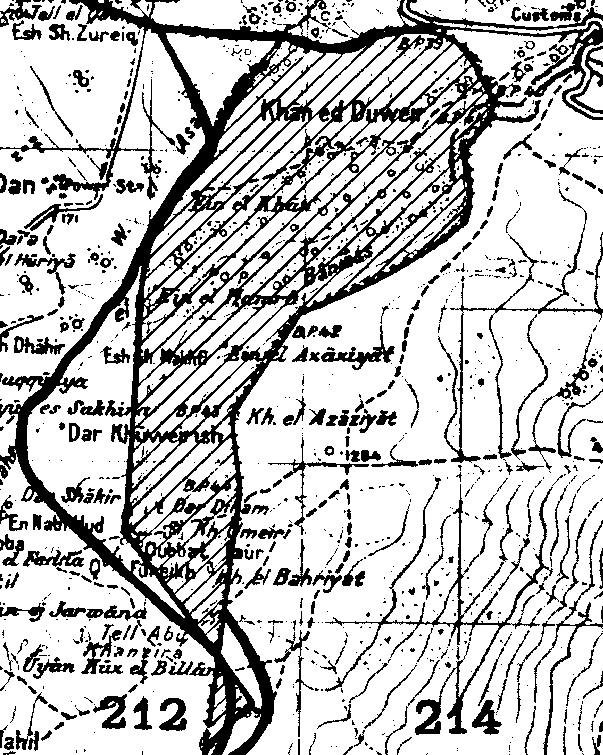
Khan al-Duwayr Demilitarized Zone, per the Israel–Syria Mixed Armistice Commission; Snir was built on the lands of the depopulated Palestinian village

The village was established on 26 September 1967 as a Nahal settlement in what had formerly been a demilitarized zone until the Six-Day War, and what had previously been the Palestinian Arab village of Khan al-Duwayr until its depopulation during the 1948 Arab–Israeli War. It was converted to a civilian kibbutz in 1968 by Hashomer Hatzair members.

During the Six-Day War, a minor Syrian force tried to capture the water plant at Tel Dan (the subject of a fierce escalation two years earlier), kibbutz Dan, and She'ar Yashuv. Several Syrian tanks were reported to have sunk in the Banias River.

Due to the fact it was situated in the Israel–Syria demilitarised zone under the 1949 Armistice Agreements, Snir was claimed by Syria as its territory during negotiations for a peace agreement in the 1990s. The Israeli government rejected the claims, as it would have led to Syria having territory west of the 1923 border between Mandatory Palestine and the French Mandate of Syria.

== Economy ==
The kibbutz grows avocados, raises cattle and runs a paper factory. Sano, a leading Israeli cleaning products company, operates a manufacturing plant on Kibbutz Snir.

== Gallery ==
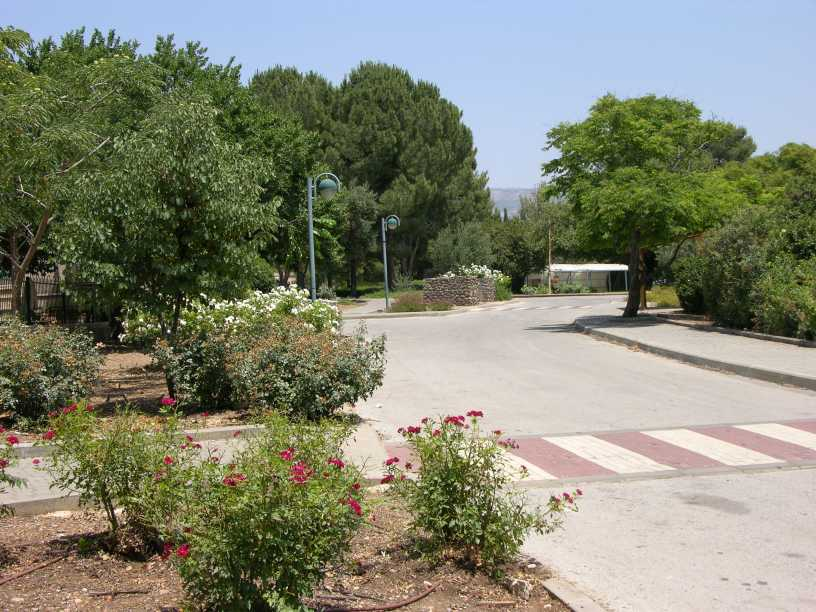
Park

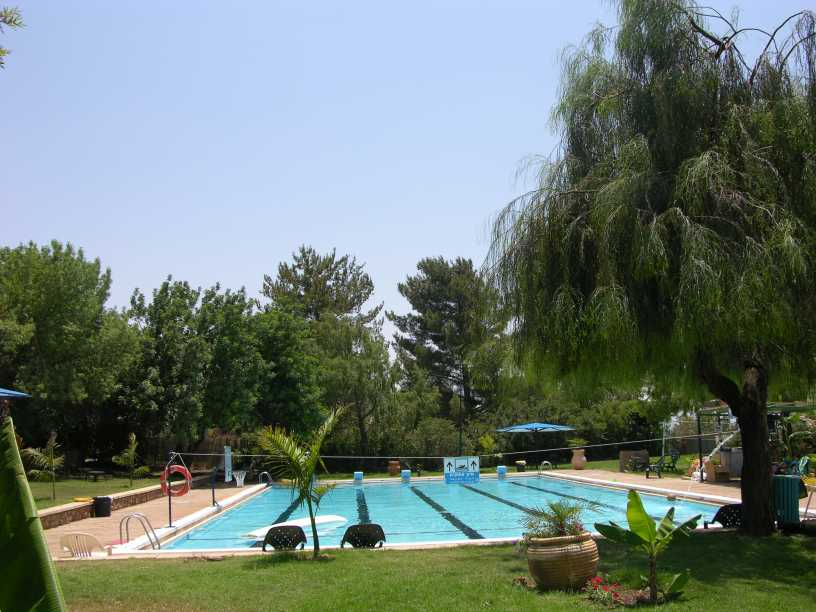
Swimming pool

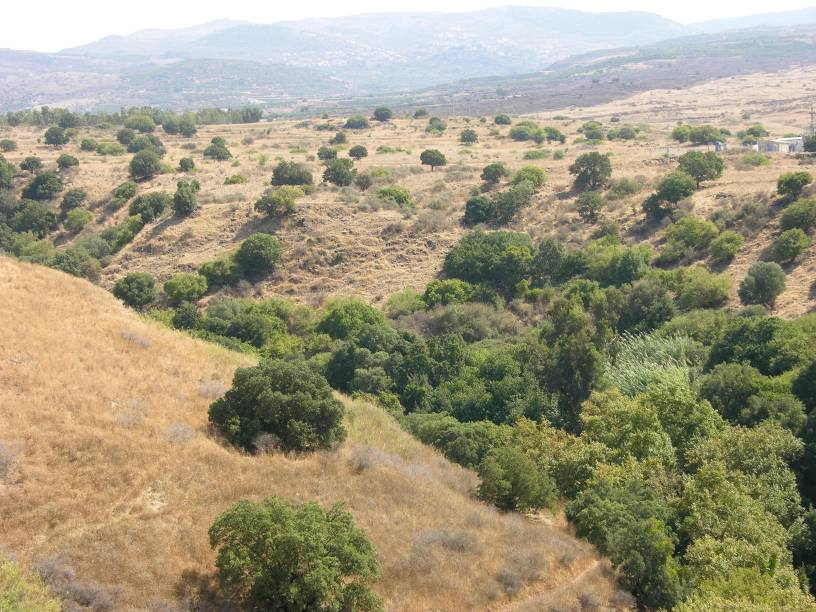
Hermon river valley
