= Dafna =

Kibbutz in northern Israel

Dafna: דפנה (Hebrew)
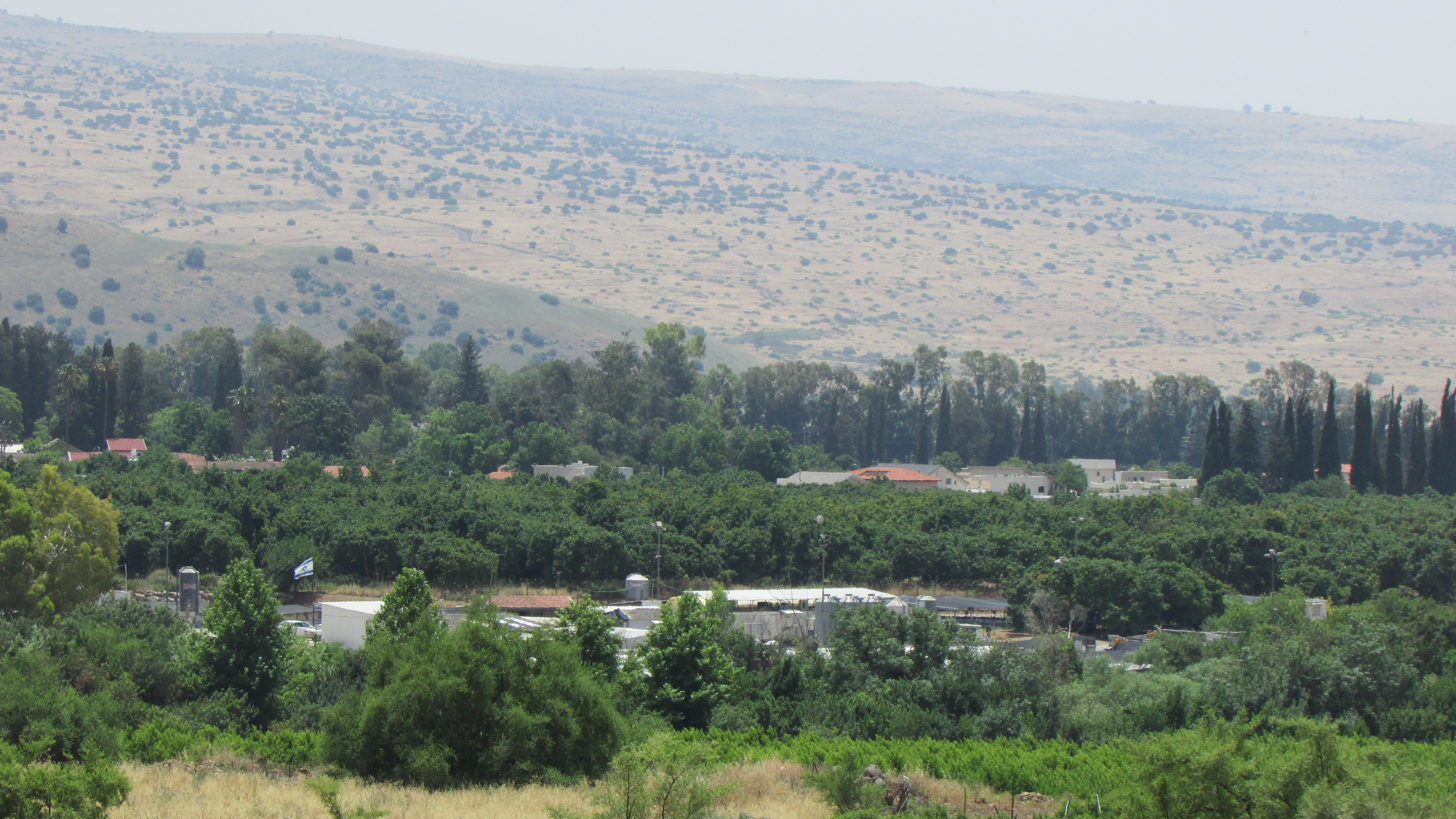

- Location within Northeast Israel Location within Israel
- Coordinates: 33°13′48″N 35°38′19″E
- Country: Israel
- District: Northern
- Subdistrict: Safed
- Council: Upper Galilee
- Affiliation: Kibbutz Movement
- Founded: 3 May 1939
- Founder: Polish and Lithuanian Habonim Dror members
- Population (2024): 1,038
- Website: www.dafna.org.il

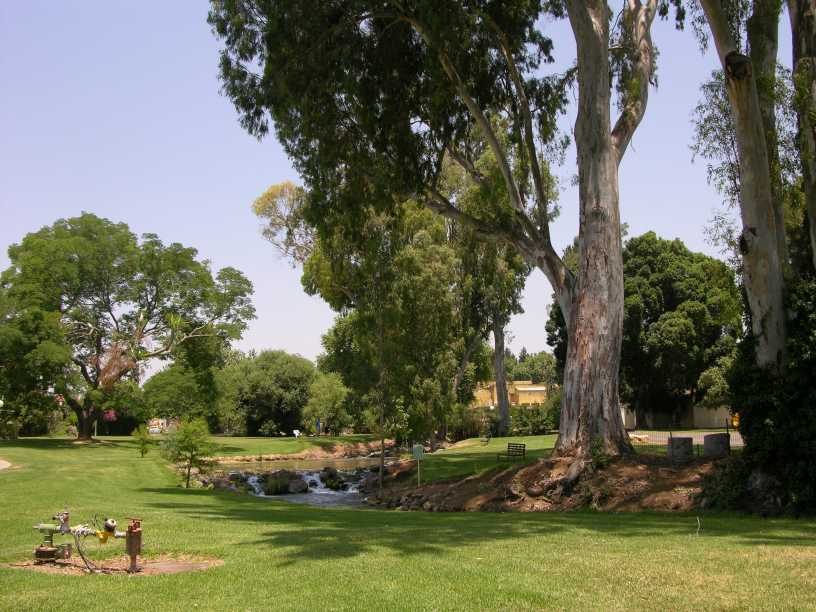
River Dan within kibbutz Dafna

Dafna (Hebrew: דפנה) is a kibbutz in the Upper Galilee in northern Israel. Located seven kilometres east of Kiryat Shmona and surrounded by three streams of the Dan River, it falls under the jurisdiction of Upper Galilee Regional Council. In 2024 it had a population of 1,038.

Dafna was founded on 3 May 1939 as a Tower and Stockade settlement, the first such settlement in the northern Hula Valley. Dafna, Beit Hillel, She'ar Yashuv and Dan were known as the "Ussishkin Fortresses", named after Menahem Ussishkin.

== Etymology ==
Dafna derives from the ancient site of Daphne mentioned in classical sources. The name Daphne (Δάφνη), meaning “laurel” or “bay tree” in Greek, is attested by Josephus as a geographic designation associated with the marshes and springs of the Hula Valley. Ottoman tax registers from 1535 preserve the toponym as Mezraʿa-i Dafna, demonstrating direct continuity of the name into the early modern period, while nineteenth-century surveys record variants such as Khirbet Dafna and Ard Dafnā. This evidence indicates sustained toponymic transmission rather than later reintroduction or scholarly identification.

== History ==
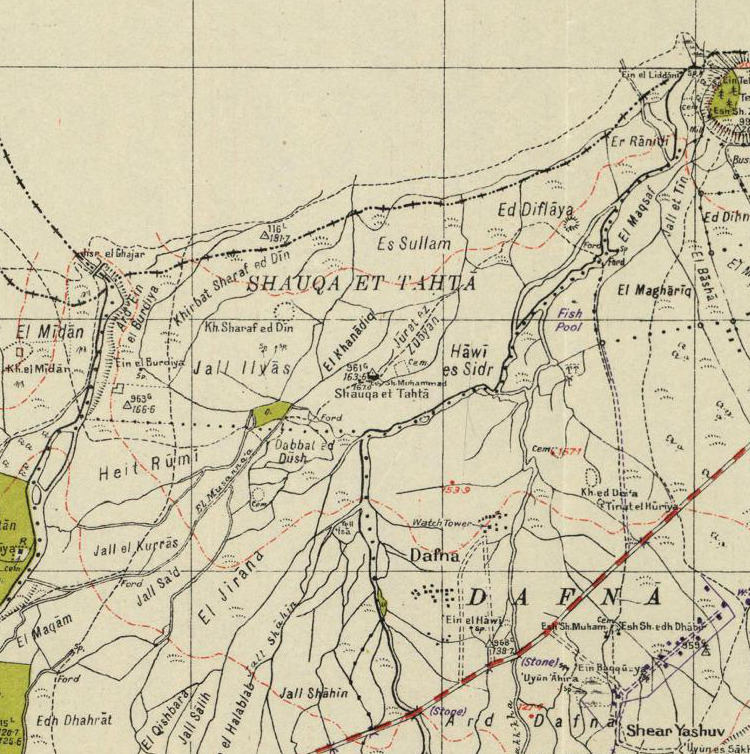
Dafna 1940s map 1:20,000

Early Roman pottery fragments have been found in an excavation in Dafna.

Edward Robinson, who visited in 1852, identified Daphne with a "low mound of rubbish with cut stones, evidently the remains of a former town" called Difneh that he encountered while riding south from Tel el-Qadi to Mansura.

The Survey of Western Palestine identified Daphne with Khirbet Dufnah, meaning "the ruin of Daphne (oleander)".

An Arab settlement was founded sometime between 1858 and 1878. Difnah was listed as a village by the Mandate government in 1924. At the time of the 1931 census, Dafna had 66 occupied houses and a population of 318 Muslims and one Christian. At the beginning of 1939, the village was pillaged by bedouin, causing most of the population to leave. The land was soon purchased by the Jewish National Fund. The JNF was represented in the negotiations by the same man, Kamel Hussein, who had earlier led the raid on Tel-Hai in which Josef Trumpeldor was killed.

The original Jewish residents were immigrants mostly from Poland and Lithuania. By the 1944/45 statistics, Dafna had a population of 380 Jews with a total land area of 2,663 dunams, of which Jews owned 2,189 dunams. Of this, a total of 2,385 dunams of land were irrigated or used for plantations, 5 dunums were used for cereals; while 50 dunams were classified as built-up (or Urban) area.

In 1947, it had a population of 600. During early 1947 Palmach Officer Moshe Kelman was ordered by the Haganah High Command to supervise the execution and burial of a Jew accused of collaborating with the British. The execution took place at Kibbutz Dafna.

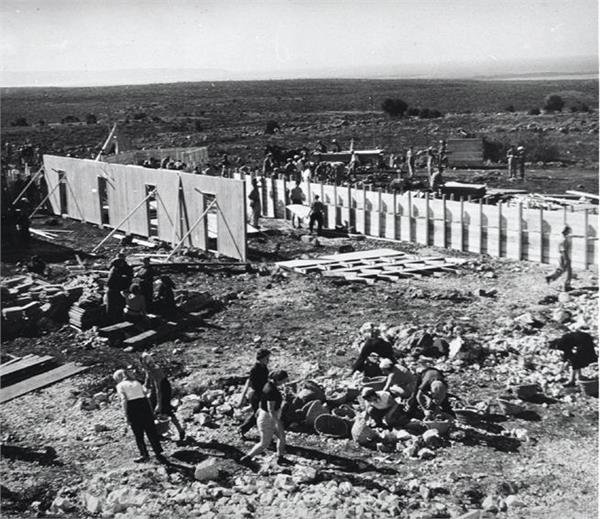
Dafna under construction in 1939

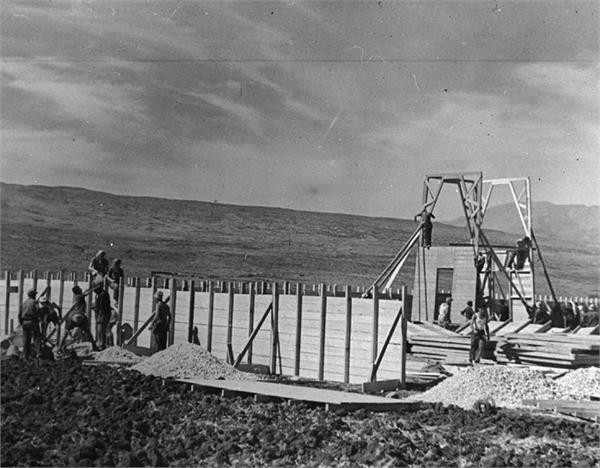
Dafna under construction in 1939

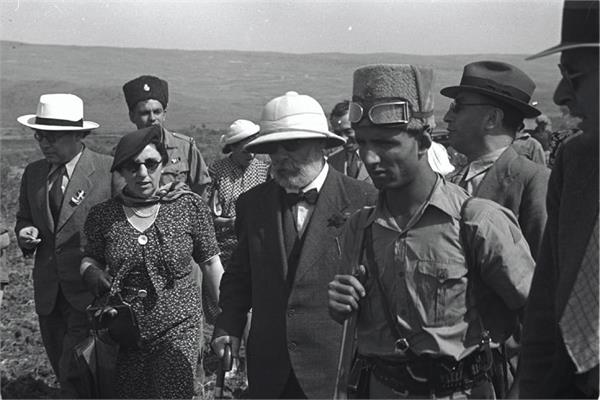
Visit by Menachem Ussishkin on 1 May 1939

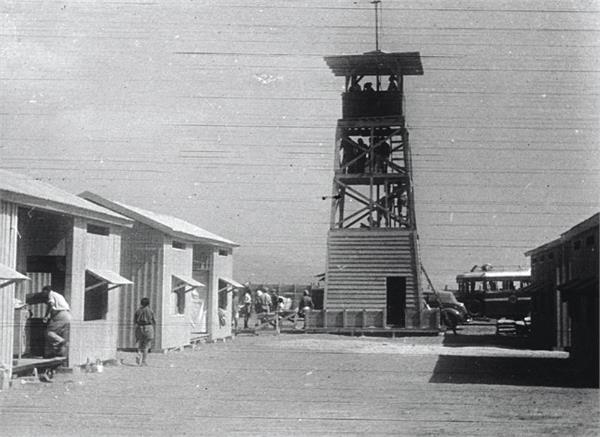
Dafna barracks & tower in 1939

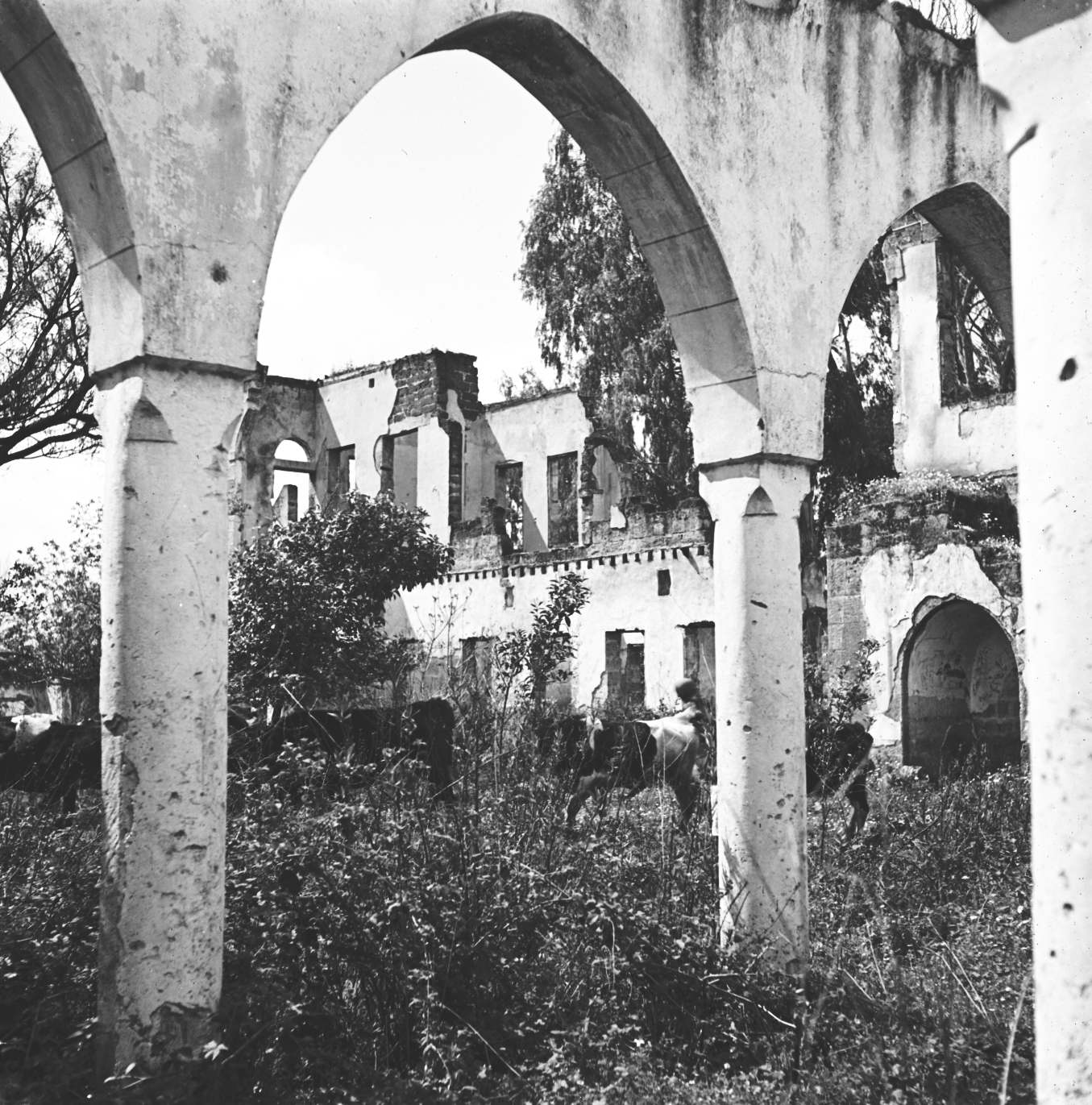
Dafna: Remains of Emir's palace in 1940 (Kibbutz HaGoshrim)

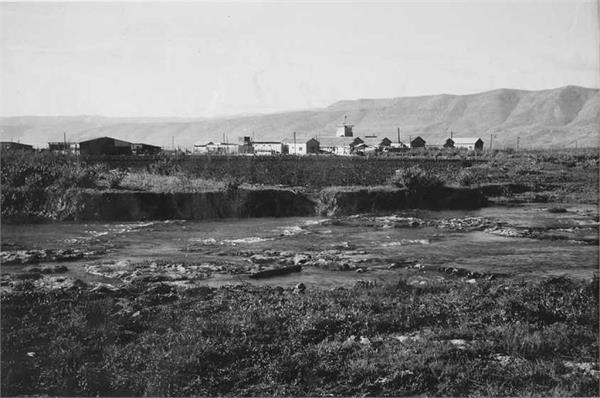
Dafna in 1942

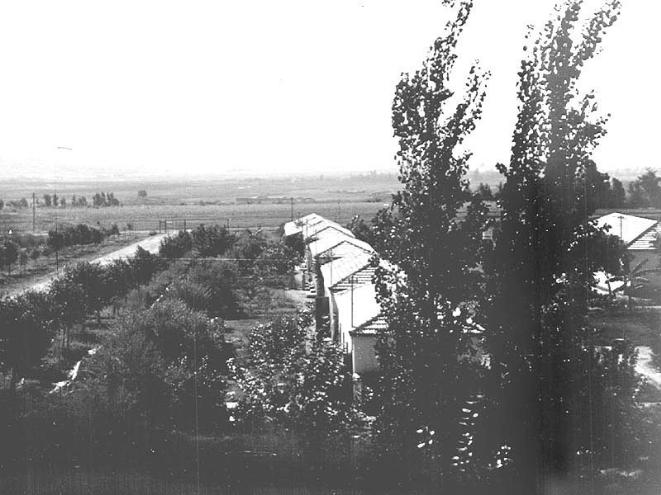
View of southern entrance to the farm, Dafna in 1947

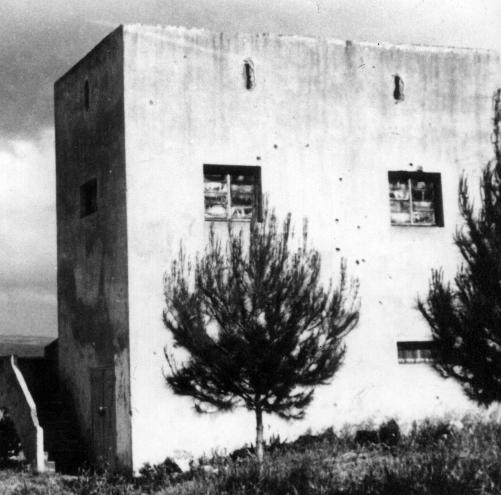
Dafna in 1948

After the 1948 Palestine war, Dafna took over land near the newly depopulated Palestinian village of Al-Sanbariyya.

According to a 1949 book by the Jewish National Fund, Dafna along with other border settlements of Dan and Kfar Szold held off the Syrian and Lebanese forces during the 1948 Arab-Israeli war. However, the settlement was often bombarded and was said to have suffered heavy damage.

The fictional kibbutz Gan Dafna, its name presumably a nod to the real-life kibbutz Dafna, figures prominently in Leon Uris's book Exodus, as the hometown of the protagonist Ari Ben Caanan.

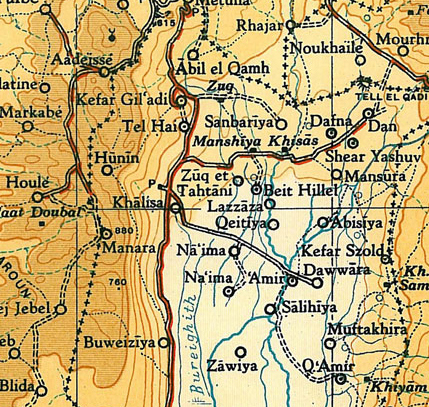
Dafna in 1946, 1:250,000

=== 1997 helicopter disaster ===
On 4 February 1997, at approximately 19:00, two "Yasur" Sikorsky CH 53 helicopters carrying 73 soldiers and loaded with ammunition collided in mid-air over She'ar Yashuv. One of the helicopters smashed into an open field near the cemetery of Dafna. It is believed that this accident increased the pressure on the IDF to withdraw its forces from Lebanon, finally done in May 2000.

Today a monument next to the cemetery of Dafna commemorates the 73 fallen soldiers. The monument consists of 73 obelisks and a running stream of water that leads, via a path of glass and stone to a huge tree whose leaves symbolize the names of those killed in the disaster. It is visited by many Israelis throughout the year.

=== 2023 Israel–Gaza war ===
During the Gaza war, northern Israeli border communities, including Dafna, faced targeted attacks by Hezbollah and Palestinian factions based in Lebanon, and were evacuated. On July 21, 2024, a Hezbollah rocket attack damaged a school, but there were no casualties.

== Climate ==
Climate data for Dafna (1991-2020)
Month	Jan	Feb	Mar	Apr	May	Jun	Jul	Aug	Sep	Oct	Nov	Dec	Year
Record high °C (°F)	27.5 (81.5)	30.9 (87.6)	36.9 (98.4)	40.4 (104.7)	42.5 (108.5)	44.8 (112.6)	44.1 (111.4)	46.9 (116.4)	46.8 (116.2)	44.5 (112.1)	35.2 (95.4)	31.5 (88.7)	46.9 (116.4)
Mean daily maximum °C (°F)	17.0 (62.6)	18.5 (65.3)	22.1 (71.8)	26.3 (79.3)	30.6 (87.1)	33.1 (91.6)	34.9 (94.8)	35.3 (95.5)	34.1 (93.4)	31.1 (88.0)	24.7 (76.5)	18.9 (66.0)	27.2 (81.0)
Daily mean °C (°F)	12.0 (53.6)	13.1 (55.6)	15.8 (60.4)	19.3 (66.7)	23.2 (73.8)	26.0 (78.8)	28.1 (82.6)	28.7 (83.7)	27.1 (80.8)	24.0 (75.2)	18.5 (65.3)	13.7 (56.7)	20.8 (69.4)
Mean daily minimum °C (°F)	7.0 (44.6)	7.5 (45.5)	9.5 (49.1)	12.2 (54.0)	15.7 (60.3)	18.8 (65.8)	21.3 (70.3)	22.1 (71.8)	20.0 (68.0)	16.8 (62.2)	12.3 (54.1)	8.4 (47.1)	14.3 (57.7)
Record low °C (°F)	−2.9 (26.8)	−1.2 (29.8)	0.4 (32.7)	0.2 (32.4)	8.4 (47.1)	12.2 (54.0)	15.4 (59.7)	16.1 (61.0)	12.2 (54.0)	6.8 (44.2)	1.7 (35.1)	−0.6 (30.9)	−2.9 (26.8)
Source: NOAA

== Education ==
Har Vagai (mountain and valley), one of the junior and senior regional high schools, is located in kibbutz Dafna. The school has 900-1000 pupils from 7th to 12th grade. The school covers an area of about 1 km square and the river Dan runs through the middle of the school grounds. The pupils are drawn from kibbutzim who were originally in the United Kibbutz movement (HaGoshrim, Kfar Szold and Dafna in the northern valley, Gadot, Mahanayim and Hulata in the south, Ein Zivan, Merom Golan and El Rom on the Golan and Malkia, Manara and Misgav Am on the mountains to the west) . Dan and Snir (originally Hashomer Hatzair) also joined later, as did many students from towns such as Rosh Pinna, Metula and Yesud HaMa'ala.

The school holds a memorial service and educational seminar every year to commemorate the 73 soldiers who were lost in the helicopter disaster of 4 February 1997. The elementary school for the kibbutz children is Aley Giva (atop a hill) which is situated in Kibbutz Kfar Giladi. The children from Dafna are taken by bus there and back every day. There is a thriving education system of kindergartens for young children from the age of 6 months up to 6 years when they start the first year of school.

== Economy ==
Dafna Industries was founded 1964 and is today one of the leading footwear exporters of Israel. Its products are exported to Europe, North and South America. Following a downturn in the world economy the factory went through a difficult period and was eventually sold to another Israeli footwear manufacturer Teva Neot with Dafna retaining a portion of the shares.

Additional economic activities, which are part of the revenue producing activities of the kibbutz, are: apple, avocado and grapefruit orchards, cotton growing, dairy cattle and commercial fishponds and renting accommodation. In addition, the tourist guest house "Ganei Dafna" (Garden of Dafna) offers recreational diversion.

The kibbutz also runs a fish restaurant and camping ground where visitors can pitch their tents next to the river and enjoy a grilled trout in the restaurant nearby. Dafna cooperated with Dan in establishing the first trout-breeding enterprise in the area.

== Bibliography ==
- Department of Statistics (1945). Village Statistics, April 1945. Government of Palestine.
- Guérin, V. (1880). Description Géographique Historique et Archéologique de la Palestine (in French). Vol. 3: Galilee, pt. 2. Paris: L'Imprimerie Nationale.
- Hadawi, S. (1970). Village Statistics of 1945: A Classification of Land and Area ownership in Palestine. Palestine Liberation Organization Research Center.
