= Sano (company) =

Detergent products manufacturer in Israel

- Native name: Hebrew: סנו
- Company type: Public
- Founded: 1961; 65 years ago
- Founder: Bruno Landesberg
- Headquarters: Hod Hasharon, Israel
- Number of employees: Approx. 2,000 (2017)
- Website: www.sano.co.il

Sano (Hebrew: סנו) is a detergent products manufacturer in Israel founded in 1961 by Bruno Landesberg. The company produces toiletries and hygiene products, disposable diapers, incontinence products for adults, household cleaning products, laundry detergents, pesticides and insect repellents, cosmetics and various paper products. Sano is headquartered in Hod Hasharon with subsidiary plants in Netanya, Kibbutz Snir, Emek Hefer and Eastern Europe.

The Latin word sano means "to heal".

== History ==
In 1952, Bruno Landesberg immigrated from Romania and began working in the accounting department at Rafael. After a few years, he began working in sales at the Kadima Chemicals Corporation, a cleaning products manufacturer. In 1959, Landesberg took advantage of a takeover of 'Kadima' to purchase the distribution line and founded the Southern Marketing Company. The first year, the company distributed products of Vitco Fertilizers. A year later, Landesberg decided to begin independent production and started pioneering a brand that would include all of his products under one name. The first Sano product was toilet bowl scouring powder.

After completing Economics and Commerce studies at Harvard University, Landesberg returned to Israel and opened a factory in Bat Yam. At the time, Sano had only four employees, one machine and three products. In 1963, Sano began selling 3M Scotch-Brite, a move that was profitable. In 1969, the company began producing mosquito repellant, cockroach control, and an air freshener named 'Sano Fresh'. In 1972, the company moved the factory to Hod Hasharon where it has since expanded and operates its main distribution center and factories.

In 1982, Sano made its first initial public offering on the Tel Aviv Stock Exchange. Two years later, Sano opened a new factory in Bnei Brak and started manufacturing disposable diapers named 'Litufim'. In the 1990s, the company began its overseas expansion by exporting to Europe and entering into a partnership to manufacture detergents in China. In 1996, Sano stopped marketing Vitco products and came out with a new line of its own.

In 2017, Sano had close to 2,000 employees and marketed over 2,000 products. Sano exports to Romania, Ukraine, Hungary, Moldova, the UK, and many other countries.

== See also ==
- Economy of Israel
