= Operation Broom =

- Part of Kurdish–Turkish conflict
Date	5 August 1991 – 13 August 1991
Location	Qandil Mountains, Iraq, Northern Iraq 36°31′59″N 44°20′26″E
Result	Operation successful

Belligerents
Turkey	Kurdistan Workers' Party (PKK)

Commanders and leaders
(Turkey) Turgut Özal (Turkey) Barlas Doğu (Turkey) Mesut Yilmaz (Turkey) Doğan Güreş (Turkey) Eşref Bitlis (Turkey) Siyami Taştan (Turkey) Safa Giray	Abdullah Öcalan; Mehmet Öcalan; Murat Karayılan; Cemîl Bayik

Strength
2,000	150

Casualties and losses
1 soldier 1 guardian 13 wounded	Unknown
- Location within Iraq

On August 4, 1991, a group of 100 to 150 PKK militants attacked the Samanlı Gendarmerie Station in Şemdinli in Hakkâri Province, southeastern Turkey using rocket launchers and other weapons. The assault left 10 soldiers dead, seven others taken hostage, and nine injured. Following a meeting of the Motherland Party’s Central Decision and Board, Turkish Prime Minister Mesut Yılmaz announced on the night of August 5, 1991 that a border operation had been launched against PKK elements in northern Iraq, with support from the Air Force Command.

The forces advanced 19 kilometres (12 mi) into Iraqi territory, and it was also revealed that Mehmet Öcalan, the brother of Abdullah Öcalan, was present at the PKK camps in the region. The Turkish Armed Forces designated this mission “Operation Broom” to emphasize its objective of eliminating PKK positions and seizing their camps and munitions—a term that was publicly associated with the idea of cleansing the area.

In the combined ground and air-supported operation, the Hakurk camp was captured, several PKK camps in the area were demolished, and many militants fled to Iran.
