= Menachem Ussishkin =

Russian-born Zionist leader

- מנחם אוסישקין
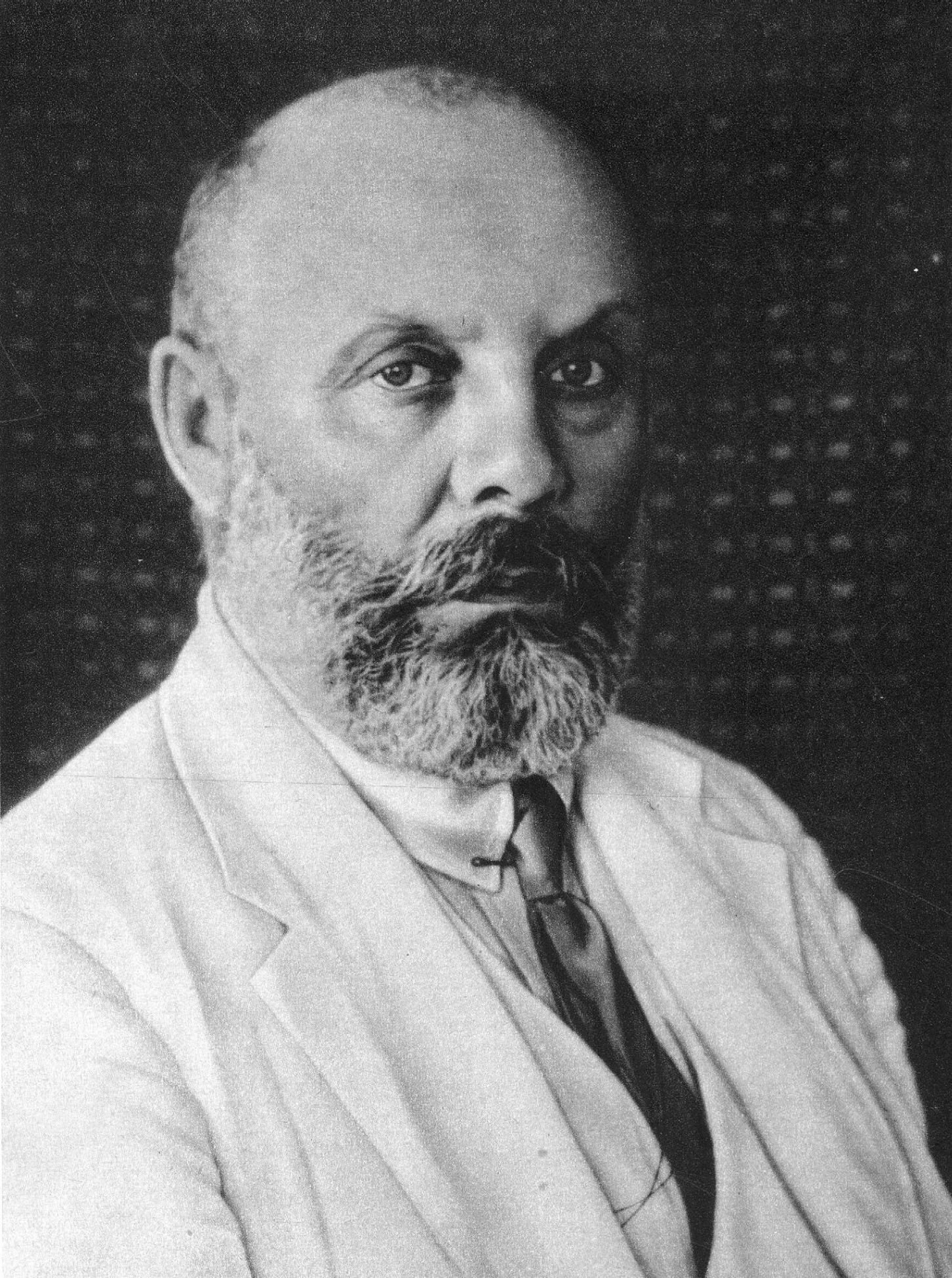
- Born: Menachem Ussishkin; August 14, 1863; Dubrovno, Russian Empire (now Dubrowna, Belarus)
- Died: October 2, 1941 (aged 78); Jerusalem, Mandatory Palestine
- Occupation: President of the Jewish National Fund
- Known for: Secretary of the First Zionist Congress

Menachem Ussishkin (Russian: Авраам Менахем Мендл Усышкин Avraham Menachem Mendel Ussishkin, Hebrew: מנחם אוסישקין; August 14, 1863 – October 2, 1941) was a Russian-born Zionist leader and head of the Jewish National Fund.

== Biography ==
Menachem Ussishkin was born in Dubrowna in the Belarusian part of the Russian Empire. He received a traditional Jewish education, but when his family moved to Moscow, he learned in secular school. In 1889, he graduated as a technical engineer from Moscow State Technical University, today known as Bauman Moscow State Technical University. Ussishkin was among the founders of the BILU movement and the Moscow branch of the Hovevei Zion. He also joined the Bnei Moshe society founded by Ahad HaAm. In 1891, he made his first trip to Palestine.

Ussishkin served as Secretary of the First Zionist Congress. In 1903, Ussishkin visited Palestine and was not present at the Sixth Zionist Congress where the Uganda plan was presented. Soon after, he became one of the main leaders who strongly opposed this plan, until it was abandoned in the Seventh Zionist Congress in 1905.

He was one of the Jewish delegates to the Paris peace conference after World War I.

In 1919, Ussishkin immigrated to what was in the process of becoming Mandatory Palestine on board the ship Ruslan. In 1920, he was appointed head of the Zionist Commission in Palestine. In his pamphlet "Our Program", he advocated group settlement based on labour Zionism. Under his influence, the Zionist movement actively supported the establishment of agricultural settlements, educational and cultural institutions, and Jewish polytechnic - later the Technion.

In 1923, Ussishkin was elected President of the Jewish National Fund which he headed until his death. Ussishkin was behind major land acquisitions in the Hefer, Jezreel and Beit She'an valleys.

In 1941, Ussishkin said he opposed any attempt to establish a Jewish state without Jews having a majority. He said that a minority-Jewish state would inevitably end in what would later be called apartheid. His proposal was to focus on large-scale immigration rather than independence: "First, a Jewish state, and second, equal rights for the Arabs, and third, transfer of the Arabs only if they consent."

"In South Africa, the blacks are eighty percent and the rulers there are the twenty percent of whites; the eighty percent have no rights at all … do you want that the Jews who are twenty percent should rule in Palestine? If that's what you say, then the way you use the term 'Jewish state' is comprehensible. But you won't say that, because you can’t say that, since there is no hope that anyone in the non-Jewish world would accept that concept, and also a large part of the Zionist movement would oppose that concept, justly or not."

== Family ==
Ussishkin had two children: His daughter, Rachel, married Friedrich Simon Bodenheimer, entomologist and son of Zionist Max Bodenheimer. His son, Samuel, a lawyer, married Elsa Schoenberg. Their son is archaeologist David Ussishkin.

== Death and burial ==
Ussishkin died in 1941 in Jerusalem at the age of 78. He is buried in Nicanor's Cave at the botanical gardens of the Hebrew University of Jerusalem on Mount Scopus.

== The "Ussishkin Fortresses" ==
This section may be expanded using the corresponding article in Hebrew (March 2024)

A group of villages in northern Israel, including Dan, Dafna, She'ar Yashuv and Beit Hillel, were collectively named the "Ussishkin Fortresses".

== Commemoration ==
Ussishkin's name is commemorated in many places in Israel. Kibbutz Kfar Menahem is named after him.

On his 70th birthday, the Rehavia neighborhood council decided to change the name of the street in which he lived, Rechov Keren Kayemet Le'Israel (Jewish National Fund) to Rechov Ussishkin, and move Rechov Keren Kayamet Le'Israel to its present location.

Following Ussishkin's death, many streets and schools in Israel were named after him, as is the largest auditorium at the International Convention Center in Jerusalem.

== Gallery ==
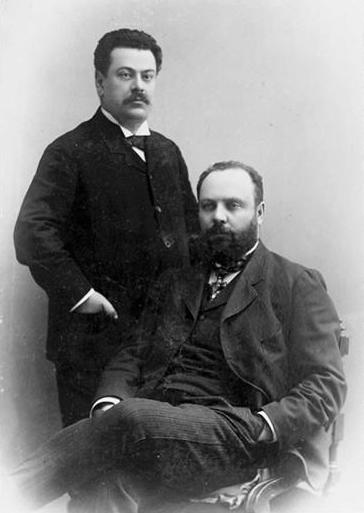
Menachem Ussishkin (seated) with Adolf Stand. pre 1919

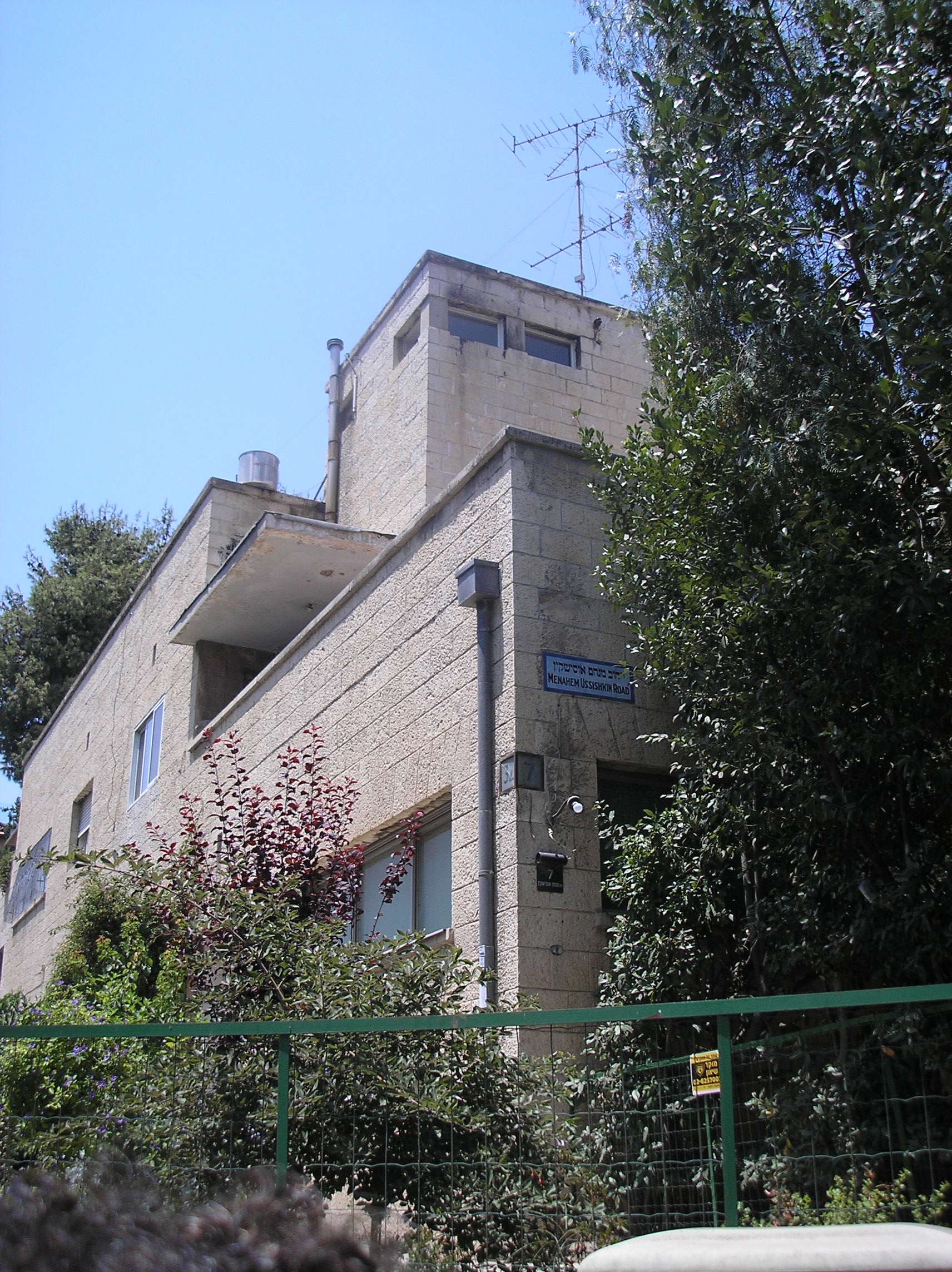
Home of Menachem Ussishkin in Rehavia, Jerusalem

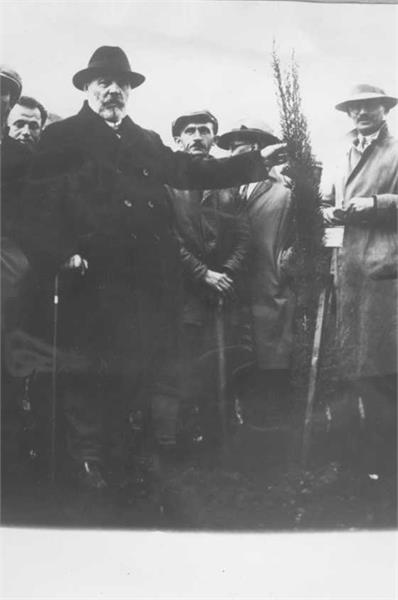
Menachem Ussishkin 1929

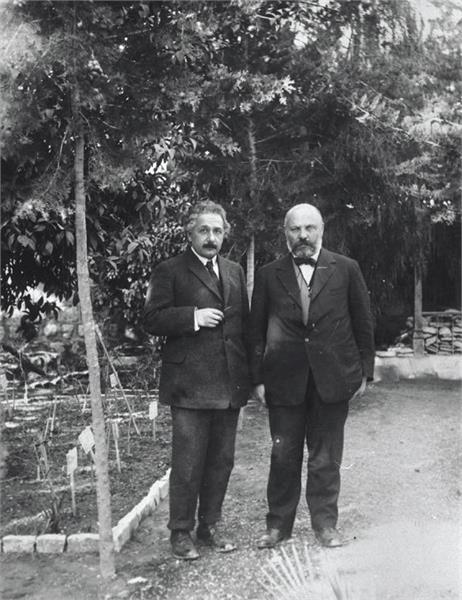
Menachem Ussishkin with Albert Einstein

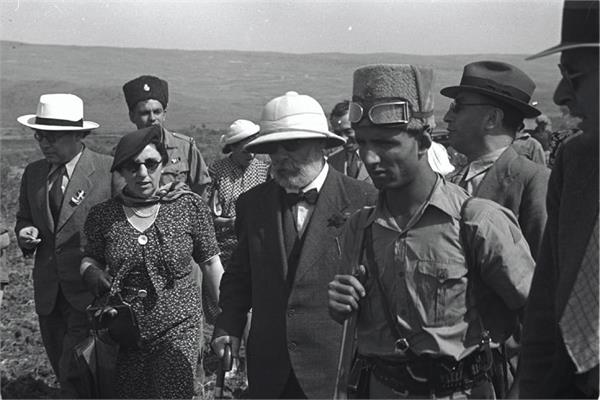
Menachem Ussishkin visiting Dafna 1 May 1939
