= Beit Hillel =

Moshav in northern Israel

Beit Hillel: בֵּית הִלֵּל (Hebrew)
- Moshav
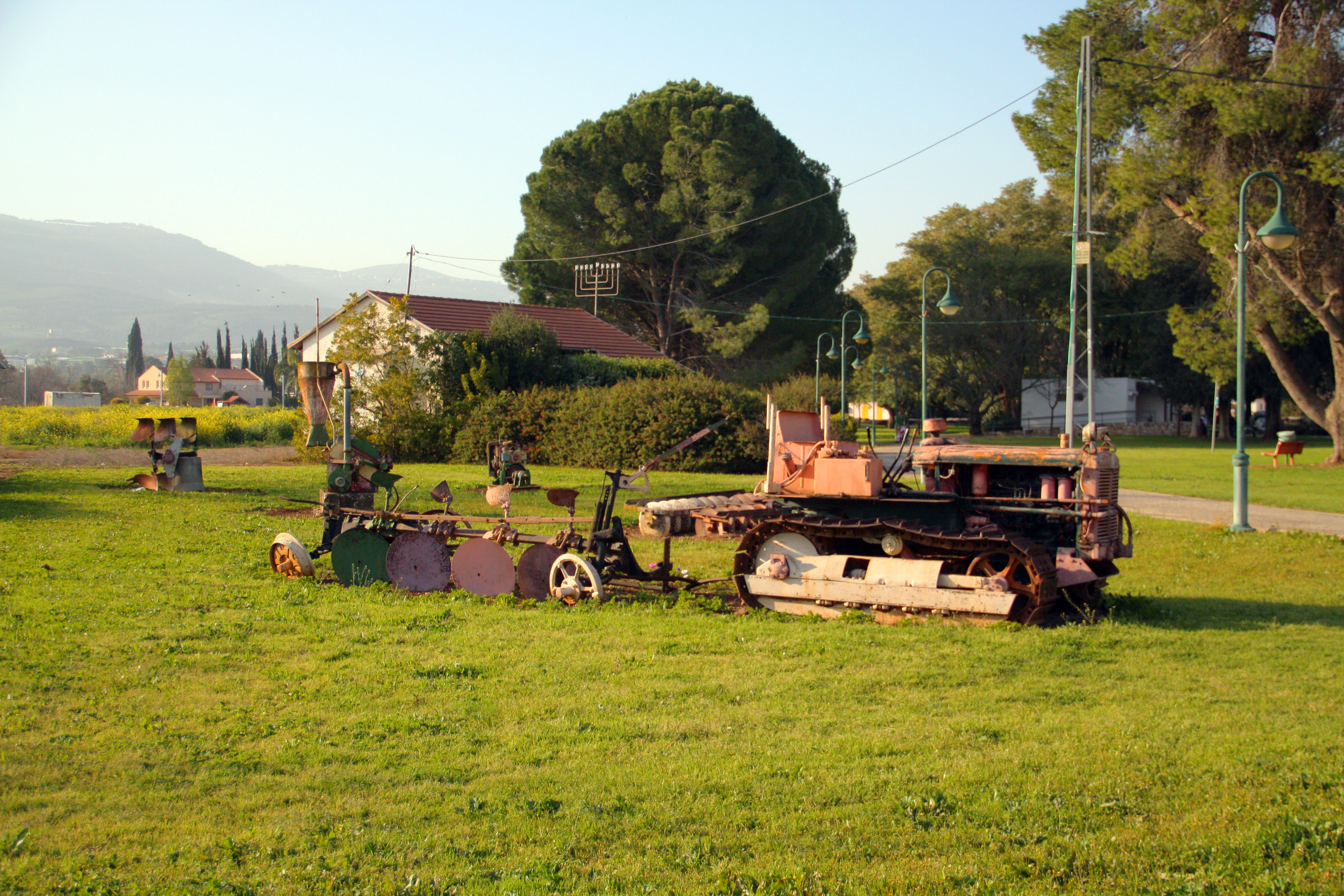

- Location within Northeast Israel Location within Israel
- Coordinates: 33°12′27″N 35°36′21″E
- Country: Israel
- District: Northern
- Subdistrict: Safed
- Council: Mevo'ot HaHermon
- Affiliation: Moshavim Movement
- Founded: 1940
- Founder: European and Sabra Jews
- Population (2024): 1,106
- Website: www.beit-hillel.org.il

Beit Hillel (Hebrew: בֵּית הִלֵּל) is a moshav in northern Israel. Located on the west bank of the Hasbani River, about 5 kilometres from Kiryat Shmona, its 3,500 dunams fall under the jurisdiction of Mevo'ot HaHermon Regional Council. As of 2024 , it had a population of 1,106.

== ِArchaeology ==
Tell al-Batṭīḥa (identified with ancient Beth-Achon) lies in the upper Hula Valley, 1 km southeast of the Beit Hillel. The mound occupies a low rise overlooking the northern Hula basin and commands access to the springs and agricultural lands of the upper Jordan system. Surface finds and survey data indicate a long occupational sequence beginning in the Early Bronze Age and continuing intermittently through the Hellenistic, Roman, and Byzantine periods. Ceramic scatters documented in survey include domestic wares and storage vessels characteristic of these phases. The site’s location within the cluster of settlements demarcated by Diocletianic boundary stones suggests that it formed part of the late Roman rural landscape administratively linked to Paneas (Banias).

== History ==
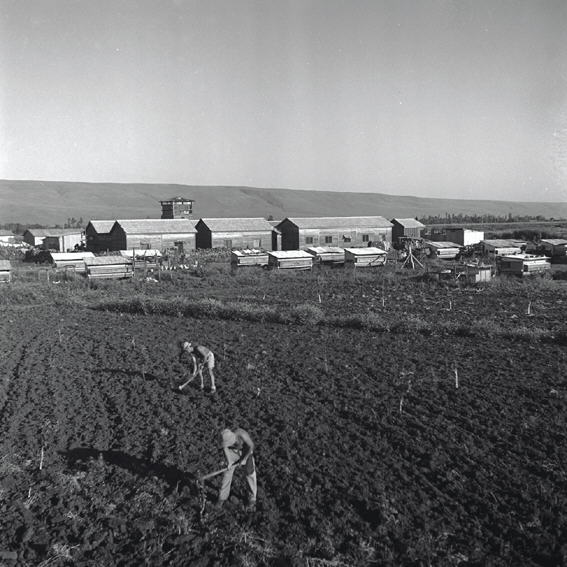
Beit Hillel 1944

The moshav was founded in 1940 as one of the "Ussishkin Fortresses", named after Menahem Ussishkin, by a mixed group of immigrants from Europe and native Sabras (Palestine-born Jews), for workers in the tower and stockade settlements in the Upper Galilee. It was named after Hillel Yaffe, a doctor who immigrated to Mandatory Palestine during the Second Aliyah. During the 1948 Arab–Israeli War Beit Hilel was temporarily abandoned due to the battles in the area; at that time, the village had a population of 98 and settled on an area of 1,085 dunams. Settlement was resumed in 1950, with the village receiving the land of the depopulated Palestinian village of Al-Zuq al-Tahtani; the new inhabitants were mainly Jews from Europe who survived the Holocaust.

Today the inhabitants of the moshav make their livelihood from agriculture, cattle farming, and tourism.

== Geography ==
Beit Hillel is situated at an altitude of 85 meters in the northernmost tip of Upper Galilee in the Hula valley at the top of the Jordan River.

The village is located about 3 kilometers east of the town of Kiryat Shmona, about 147 kilometers northeast of Tel Aviv and about 72 kilometers northeast of Haifa.

Beit Hillel is connected to the transport network via the local road number 9888, which leads north of the village to the 99 motorway leading to the Golan Heights.

In Beit Hillel, pre-school care facilities are available. The primary school is in nearby Kfar Gil'adi, and the high school is in Kfar Blum. Beit Hillel has a synagogue, a health center and a grocery store.

== Demography ==
The population of Beit Hillel is secular. According to the 2014 data, the vast majority of Beit Hillel Jews (including the "other" statistical category, which includes non-Jewish inhabitants of Jewish origin but without formal jurisdiction over the Jewish religion), formed the vast majority of the population.

== Notable residents ==
- Ido Kozikaro
