= Dan, Israel =

Kibbutz in Northern Israel

Dan: דָּן (Hebrew)
- Kibbutz
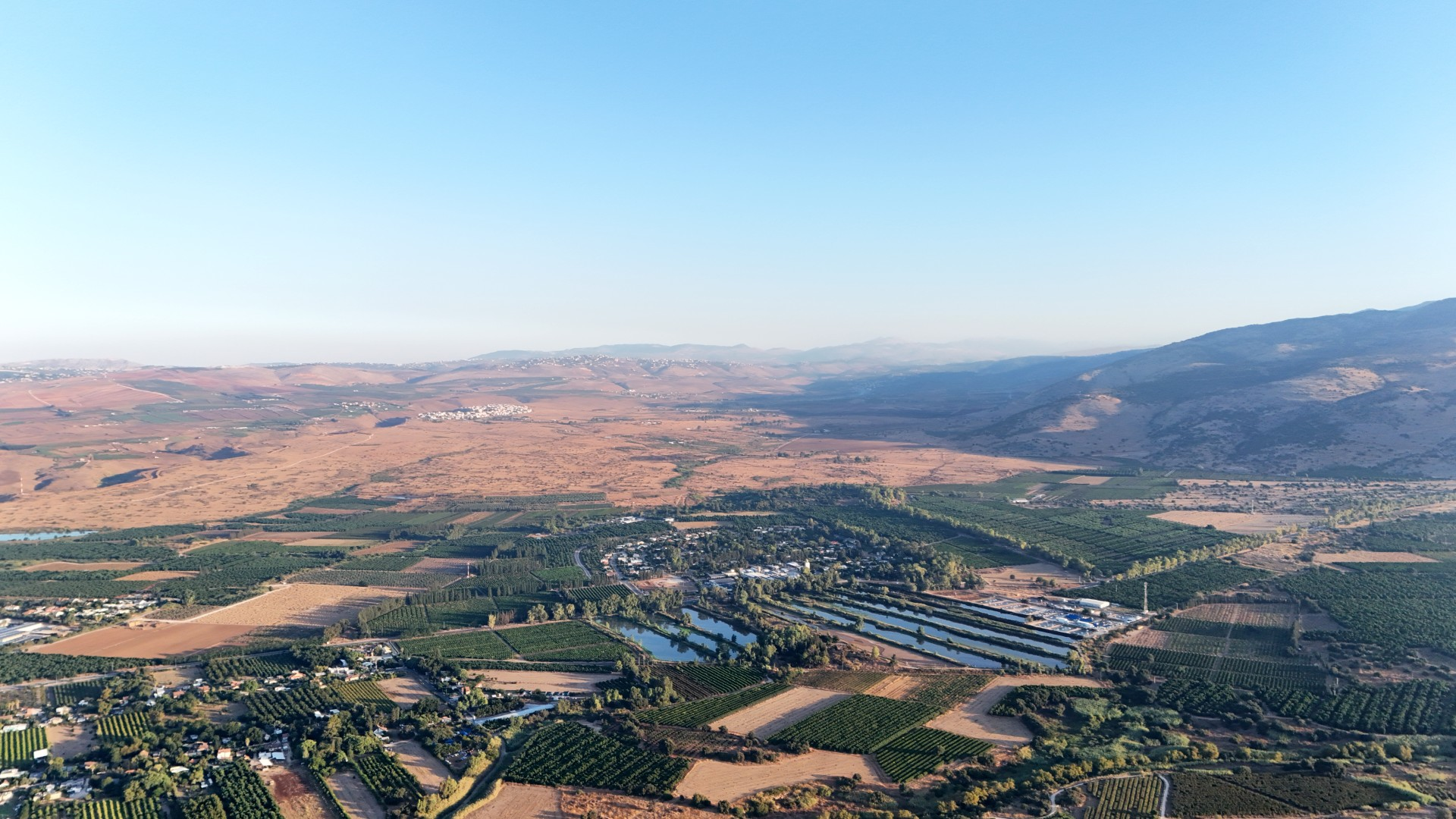
- View of Dan

- Location within Northeast Israel Location within Israel
- Coordinates: 33°14′25″N 35°39′11″E
- Country: Israel
- District: Northern
- Subdistrict: Safed
- Council: Upper Galilee
- Affiliation: Kibbutz Movement
- Founded: 1939
- Founder: Hungarian HaShomer Members
- Population (2024): 840
- Website: www.kdan.co.il

Dan (Hebrew: דָּן) is a kibbutz in northern Israel. Located in the north of the Hula Valley, at the foot of Mount Hermon, it falls under the jurisdiction of Upper Galilee Regional Council. As of 2024 it had a population of 840.

== History ==
Dan was founded in 1939 by Jewish farmers from Transylvania as part of the Tower and Stockade campaign. It is affiliated with the Hashomer Hatzair movement. In 1947, the population was 340. Dan was one of two villages established in honour of Menachem Ussishkin and counted among the "Ussishkin Fortresses". It was named after the Israelite town of "Dan" mentioned in Genesis 14:14, 1 Samuel 3:20 and 1 Kings 12:29, which has been identified with the nearby Tel Dan. Kibbutz Dan is located in the territory of the Israelite tribe of Dan delineated in Joshua 19:47. It suffered heavy losses during the 1948 Arab–Israeli War, bearing the brunt of the Syrian invasion.

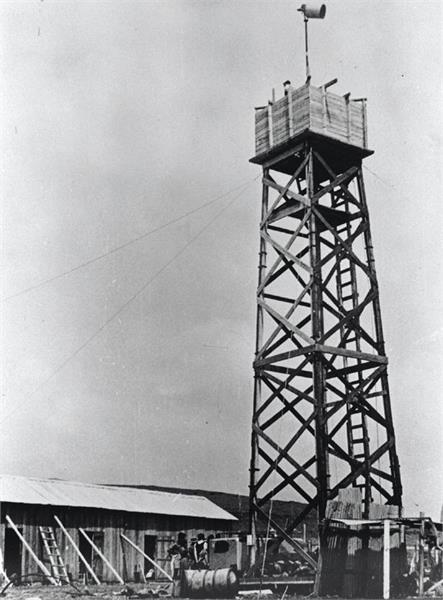
Dan under construction, 1940

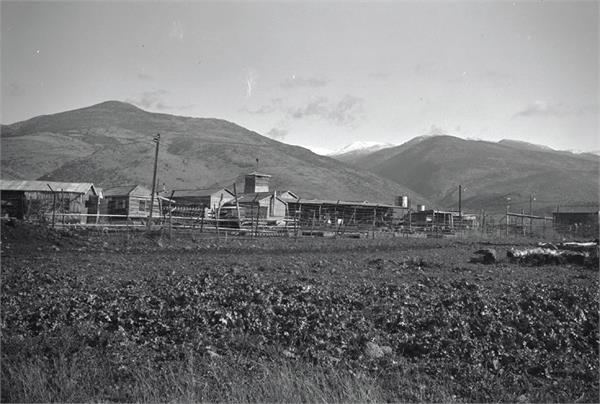
Dan in 1940

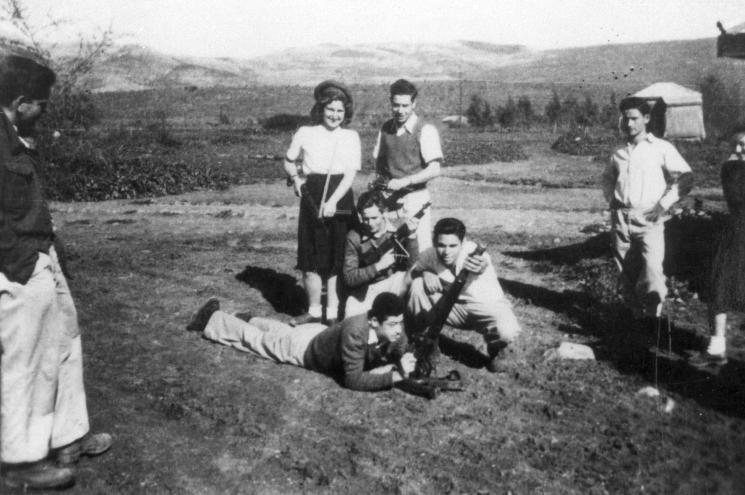
Palmach mortar training at Dan, 1948

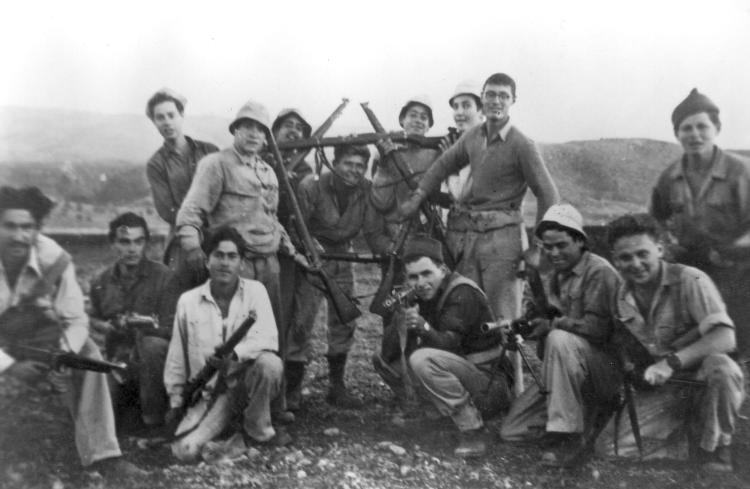
Yiftach Brigade stationed at Dan, 1948

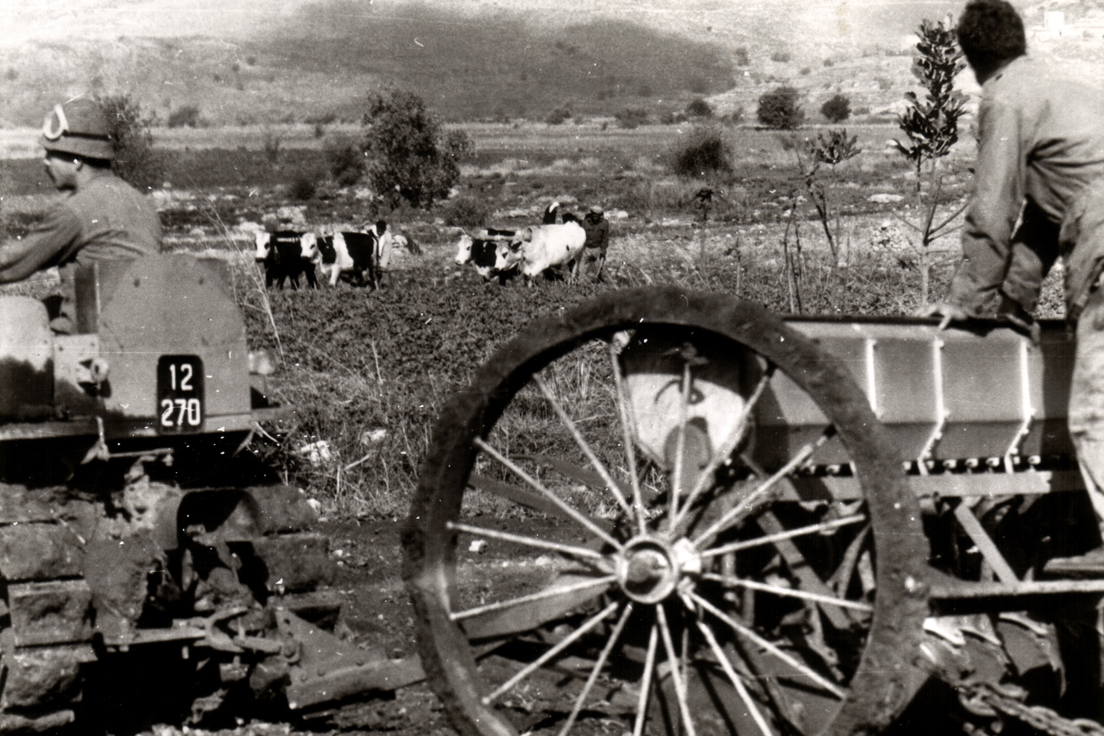
Working in the field, 1948–49

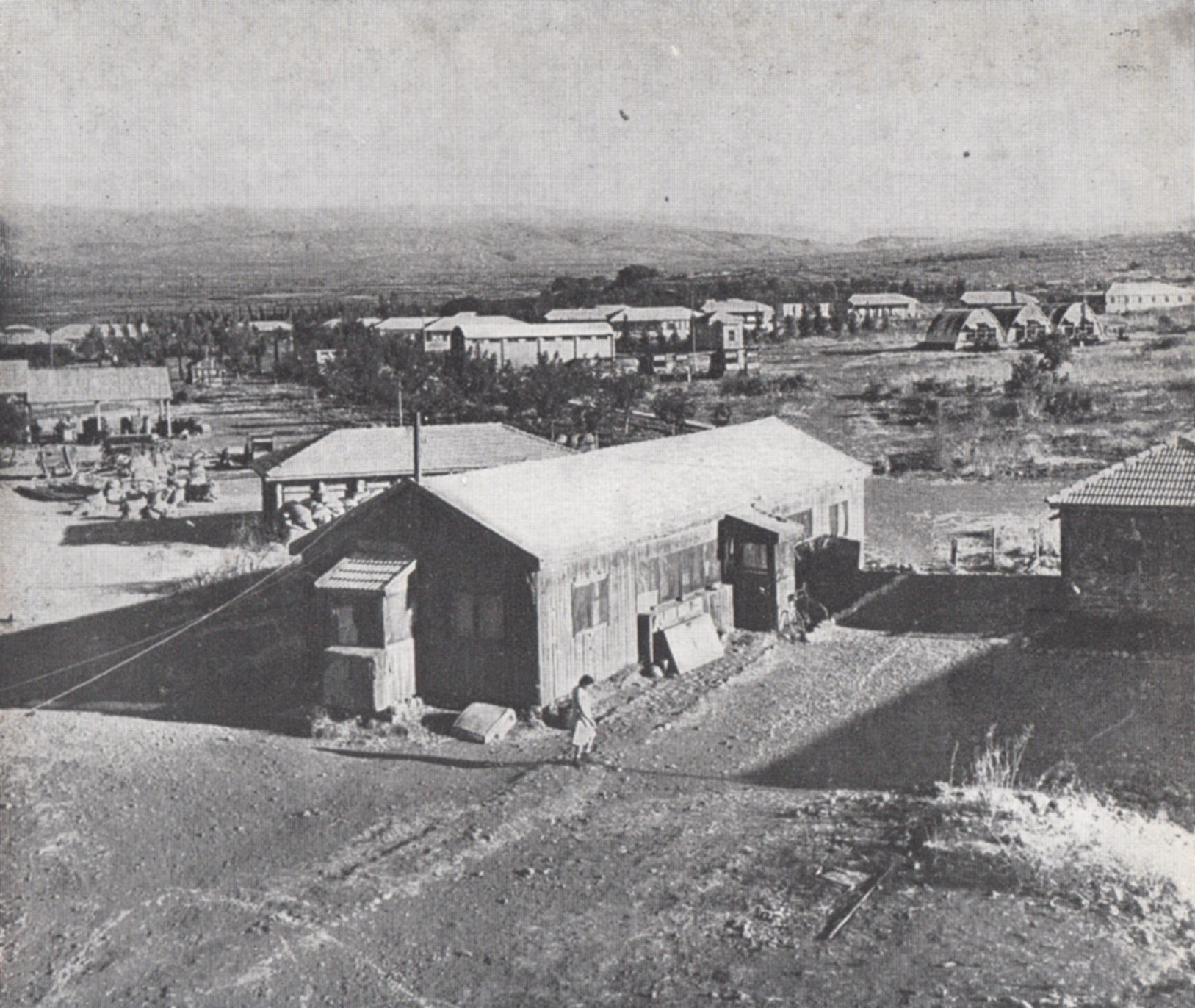
Dan during early 1950s

== Economy ==
One of the first economic branches in the kibbutz was a cooperative trout-breeding venture with neighbouring kibbutz of Dafna.

The Caviar Galilee Company, which exports caviar under the brand name "Karat Caviar," is based on the kibbutz. The caviar is well-regarded; Eric Ripert, chef and proprietor of Le Bernardin, and Jean Francois Bruel, chef of Restaurant Daniel, have stated their preference for the brand. The kibbutz exports caviar to the United States, Europe, Russia, Japan, Singapore and Canada. In 2011, the company produced 3,000 kilograms. It has plans to increase production gradually to 8,000 kilograms a year.

A museum for the nature and history of the area, "Bet Ussishkin," operates at the Kibbutz.

== Landmarks ==
- Tel Dan
- Dan is the starting point of the Israel National Trail.
