= List of towns and villages depopulated in the 1948 Palestine war =

Clickable map of the depopulated locations

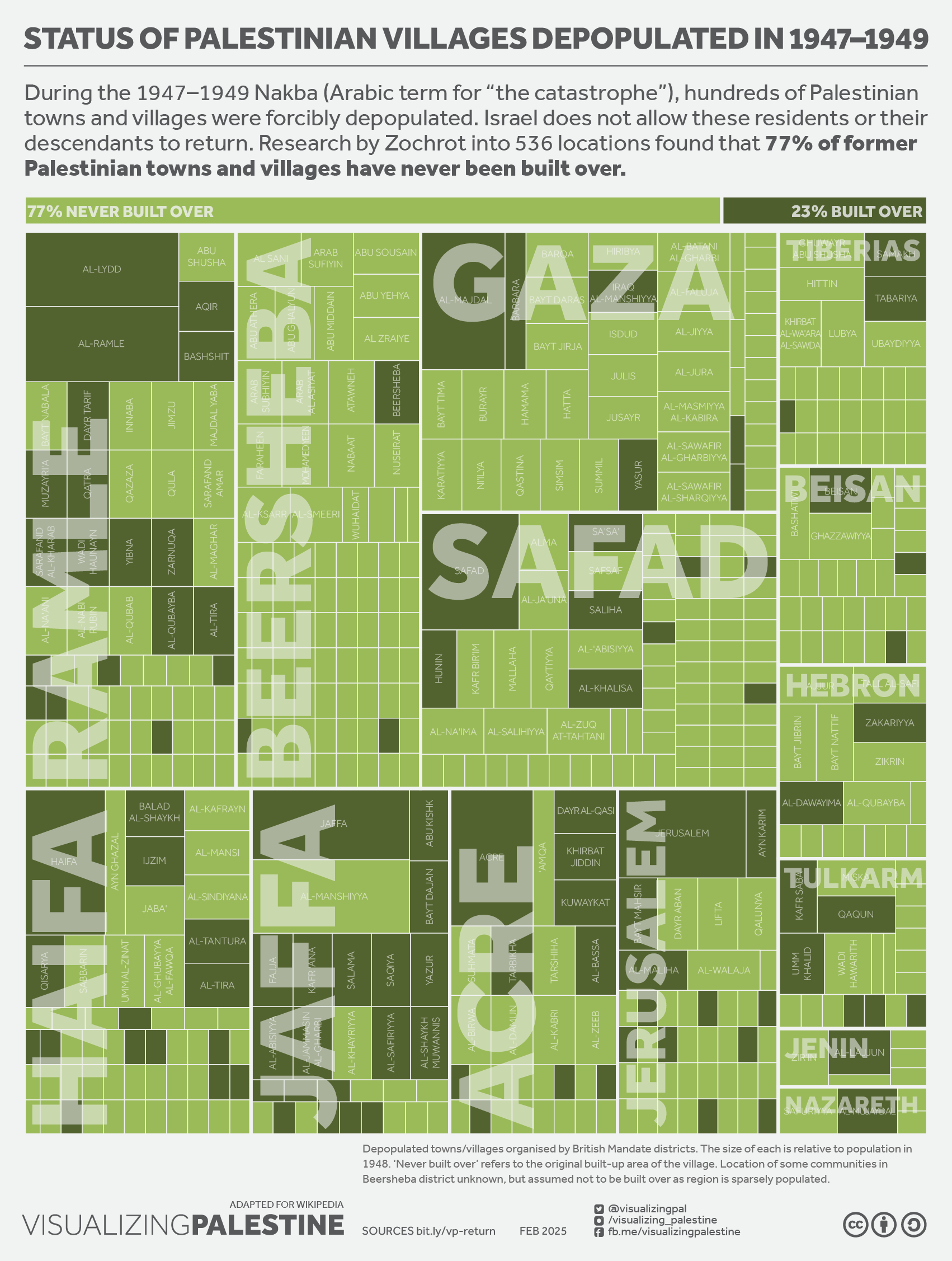
Chart showing the status of Palestinian villages depopulated in 1947-1949

During the 1947–1949 Palestine war, or the Nakba, around 400 Palestinian Arab towns and villages were forcibly depopulated by Israeli forces, with a majority being destroyed and left uninhabitable. Today these locations are all in Israel; many of the locations were repopulated by Jewish immigrants, with their place names replaced with Hebrew place names.

Arabs remained in small numbers in some of the cities (Haifa, Jaffa and Acre); and Jerusalem was divided between Jordan and Israel. Around 30,000 Palestinians remained in Jerusalem in what became the Arab part of it (East Jerusalem). In addition, some 30,000 non-Jewish refugees relocated to East Jerusalem, while 5,000 Jewish refugees moved from the Old City to West Jerusalem on the Israeli side. An overwhelming number of the Arab residents who had lived in the cities that became a part of Israel and were renamed (Acre, Haifa, Safad, Tiberias, Ashkelon, Beersheba, Jaffa and Beisan) fled or were expelled. Most of the Palestinians who remain there are internally displaced people from the villages nearby.

A number of the towns and villages were destroyed by Israeli forces in the aftermath of the 1948 war, but it was not until 1965 that more than 100 remaining locations – including many of the largest depopulated places – were demolished by the Israel Land Administration.

There are more than 120 "village memorial books" documenting the history of the depopulated Palestinian villages. These books are based on accounts given by villagers. Rochelle A. Davis has described the authors as seeking "to pass on information about their villages and their values to coming generations".

The towns and villages listed below are arranged according to the subdistricts of Mandatory Palestine in which they were situated.

== Table ==
Name	Subdistrict	Image	Date of depopulation	Arab population 1948	Land area (dunums)	Israeli operation	Massacres	Status	Coordinates	Modern location
Jaffa	Jaffa		26 April 1948	76,920	17,510		Massacre, atrocity		32°03′08″N 34°45′11″E	
Haifa (Arab)	Haifa		21 April 1948	72,848	54,305		Massacre, atrocity		32°49′0″N 34°59′0″E	
Jerusalem (Qatamon)	Jerusalem		28 April 1948	69,693	20,790	various	Massacre, atrocity		31.761°N 35.207°E	
Tarabin Bedouin	Beersheba		5 December 1948	32,665	1,362,475	Yoav/Assaf		Some walls	31.3455°N 34.7391°E	
Lydda	Ramle	Photo of the village or town	10 July 1948	19,442	23,723		Massacre, atrocity		31°57′7″N 34°53′17″E	
Ramla	Ramle	Photo of the village or town	10 July 1948	17,586	40,567		Atrocity		31°56′N 34°52′E	
'Azazme Bedouin	Beersheba		1 May 1950	16,746	5,700,000					
Tayaha Bedouin	Beersheba		20 October 1948	16,248	2,085,825	Yoav				
Acre	Acre		17 May 1948	14,280	1,29	Ben-Ami	Massacre		32°55′40″N 35°04′54″E	
Al Majdal	Gaza		4 November 1948	11,496	43,680	Yoav			31°40′N 34°34′E	Ashkelon
Safad (Arab)	Safad	Photo of the village or town	11 May 1948	11,055	4,431	Yiftach	Atrocity		32°57′57″N 35°29′54″E	
Jbarat Bedouin	Beersheba		20 October 1948	9,058	379,175	Yoav				
Salama	Jaffa		25 April 1948	7,807	6,471	Hametz	Evacuation	3 or more Jewish families	32°02′57″N 34°48′18″E	Tel Aviv
Hanajreh Bedouin	Beersheba		22 December 1948	7,599	78,325	Yoav/Hill 86				
al-'Abbasiyya	Jaffa		4 May 1948	6,554	20,540		Atrocity	3 or more Jewish families	32°01′51″N 34°53′25″E	Yehud, Magshimim, Ganne Yehuda, Ganne Tiqwa, and Savyon
Beersheba	Beersheba	Photo of the village or town	21 October 1948	6,461	3,890	Yoav	Massacre, military assault, expulsions		31°15′32″N 34°47′59″E	
Yibna	Ramle		4 June 1948	6,287	59,554	Barak		3 or more Jewish families	31°51′58″N 34°44′47″E	Yavne, Beit Raban, Kfar HaNagid, Beit Gamliel
al-Kabri	Acre		21 May 1948	6,218	47,428	Ben-Ami	Massacre, military assault, fear	Rubble	33°00′56″N 35°09′03″E	Kabri, Ga'aton, Me'ona, Ein Ya'akov, Ma'alot, Kefar Vradim
Tiberias (Arab)	Tiberias		18 April 1948	6,160	15,729		Massacre, atrocity		32°47′40″N 35°32′00″E	
al-Tira	Haifa		16 July 1948	6,113	45,262		Massacre, atrocity	3 or more Jewish families	32°45′43″N 34°58′31″E	HaHotrim, Tirat Carmel, Megadim, Kfar Galim, Kfar Tzvi Sitrin
Beisan	Beisan		12 May 1948	6,009	28,957	Gideon	Massacre		32°30′N 35°30′E	
Hamama	Gaza		4 November 1948	5,812	41,366	Yoav		No trace	31°41′29″N 34°35′24″E	Nitzanim, Beit Ezra, Eshkolot
al-Faluja	Gaza	Photo of the village or town	1 March 1949	5,417	38,038			Rubble	31°37′29″N 34°44′52″E	Kiryat Gat, Shahar, Noga, Nir Chen, Nehora
Isdud	Gaza		28 October 1948	5,359	47,871	Yoav/Ha-Har	Massacre		31°45′13″N 34°39′43″E	Ashdod
Saffuriyya	Nazareth		16 July 1948	5,023	55,378	Dekel	Atrocity	Some houses	32°44′44″N 35°16′43″E	
Balad al-Sheikh	Haifa		25 April 1948	4,779	9,849	Barak	Balad al-Shaykh massacre, atrocity	3 or more Jewish families	32°46′18″N 35°02′32″E	Nesher
Yazur	Jaffa	Photo of the village or town	1 May 1948	4,675	11,807	Hametz	Atrocity	1 or 2 Jewish families	32°01′44″N 34°47′58″E	Azor, Holon
Bayt Dajan	Jaffa		25 April 1948	4,454	17,327	Hametz		3 or more Jewish families	32°0′13″N 34°49′46″E	Beit Dagan Mishmar HaShiv'a Hemed Ganot
'Ajjur	Hebron		23 July 1948	4,327	58,074	Yoav		Some houses	31°41′28″N 34°55′26″E	Agur, Tzafririm, Givat Yeshayahu, Li-On, Tirosh Britannia Park
al-Dawayima	Hebron		29 October 1948	4,304	60,585	Yoav	Massacre	Rubble	31°32′10″N 34°54′43″E	Karmei KatifAmatzia
Shefa-'Amr	Haifa		16 July 1948	4,211	89,985	Dekel			32°48′20″N 35°10′10″E	
Samakh	Tiberias	Photo of the village or town	28 April 1948	4,014	18,611			Rubble	32°42′18″N 35°35′15″E	Ma'agan Tel Katzir Masada, Sha'ar HaGolan
Ayn Karim	Jerusalem	Photo of the village or town	18 July 1948	3,689	15,029			3 or more Jewish families	31°45′55″N 35°8′58″E	
al-Safiriyya	Jaffa		20 May 1948	3,561	12,842	Hametz		3 or more Jewish families	31°59′36″N 34°51′04″E	Tzafria, Kfar Chabad, Ahi'ezer Tochelet Sharir Shafrir (at the site of what is now Kfar Chabad) has been absorbed in the previous, and in the suburbs of Rishon LeZion
Ijzim	Haifa		24 July 1948	3,445	46,905	Shoter	Massacre	3 or more Jewish families	32°38′41″N 34°59′17″E	Kerem Maharal
al-Bassa	Acre		14 May 1948	3,422	29,535		Al-Bassa massacre, military assault, expulsion	Some houses	33°04′34″N 35°08′27″E	Betzet, Rosh HaNiqra, Shlomi, Tzahal, Matzuva
Kafr 'Ana	Jaffa		25 April 1948	3,248	17,353	Hametz		No trace	32°1′38″N 34°52′5″E	Neve Monosson Yagel Or Yehuda
Bayt Daras	Gaza		11 May 1948	3,190	16,357		Massacre, atrocity	Rubble	31°43′24″N 34°40′58″E	Giv'ati Emunim Azrikam
Burayr	Gaza		12 May 1948	3,178	46,184	Barak	Massacre	Some walls	31°34′14″N 34°38′21″E	Bror Hayil, Tlamim, Zohar, Sde David, Heletz
Lifta	Jerusalem		1 January 1948	2,958	8,743		Atrocity	3 or more Jewish families	31°47′43″N 35°11′47″E	
al-Masmiyya al-Kabira	Gaza		8 July 1948	2,923	20,687	An-Far		3 or more Jewish families	31°45′27″N 34°47′05″E	Bnei Re'em, Hatzav, Yinon, Ahva
Aqir	Ramle		6 May 1948	2,877	15,825		Atrocity	3 or more Jewish families	31°51′40″N 34°49′23″E	Kiryat Ekron, Mazkeret Batya Ganei Yohanan
Bayt Jibrin	Hebron	Photo of the village or town	29 October 1948	2,819	56,185	Yoav		3 or more Jewish families	31°36′19″N 34°53′54″E	Beit Guvrin (kibbutz)
al-Jura	Gaza		4 November 1948	2,807	12,224	Yoav		Some houses	31°39′54″N 34°33′15″E	Ashkelon
Barbara	Gaza		4 November 1948	2,796	13,978	Yoav		Some walls	31°37′26″N 34°34′46″E	Mavki'im, Talmei Yafeh
Bayt Mahsir	Jerusalem		10 May 1948	2,784	16,268			3 or more Jewish families	31°47′40″N 35°02′05″E	Beit Meir, Mesilat Zion
Zarnuqa	Ramle		27 May 1948	2,761	6,068	Barak	Atrocity	1 or 2 Jewish families	31°52′49″N 34°47′23″E	Rehovot, Kvutzat Shiller, Gibton and Givat Brenner
Lubya	Tiberias		16 July 1948	2,726	39,629	Dekel		Rubble	32°46′33″N 35°25′46″E	Lavi, Lavi Pine Forest, South African Park
Bayt Nabala	Ramle		13 May 1948	2,680	15,051			Some walls	31°59′11″N 34°57′32″E	Kfar Truman, and Beit Nehemia
Dayr al-Qassi	Acre		30 October 1948	2,668	34,011	Hiram		3 or more Jewish families	33°02′07″N 35°19′30″E	Mattat, Elkosh, Abirim, Netu'a
Hiribya	Gaza		1 November 1948	2,598	22,312	Yoav		Some houses	31°36′21″N 34°32′47″E	Zikim, Karmia, Yad Mordechai
Wadi al-Hawarith	Tulkarm		15 March 1948	2,552	4,447		Atrocity	1 or 2 Jewish families	32°23′56″N 34°52′48″E	Kfar Haroeh, Geulei Teiman
Ayn Ghazal	Haifa		24 July 1948	2,517	18,079	Shoter	Massacre	Some walls	32°37′55″N 34°58′03″E	Ein Ayala?Ofer
Bayt Nattif	Hebron		21 October 1948	2,494	44,587	Ha-Har		Rubble	31°41′44″N 34°59′46″E	Netiv HaLamed-Heh, Aviezer, Neve Michael
al-Mansura	Tiberias		10 May 1948	2,482	55,583	Hiram		Some walls	32°53′39″N 35°25′03″E	Chazon Tefashot, Kallanit, Ravid
Dayr Aban	Jerusalem		19 October 1948	2,436	22,734	Ha-Har		Some walls	31°44′35″N 35°00′38″E	Tzora, Mahseya, Beit Shemesh, and Yish'i
Iraq al-Manshiyya	Gaza		1 March 1949	2,332	17,901	Yoav		No trace	31°36′17″N 34°46′59″E	Gat, Kiryat Gat, Sde Moshe
al-Qubab	Ramle		15 May 1948	2,297	13,918			3 or more Jewish families	31°52′00″N 34°57′15″E	Gezer, Kefar Bin-Nun, Mishmar Ayyalon
Qaqun	Tulkarm	Photo of the village or town	5 June 1948	2,285	41,767			Rubble	32°21′36″N 34°59′43″E	HaMa'apil, Gan Yoshiya, Ometz, ´Olesh, Haniel, Yikon
Sarafand al-Amar	Ramle		20 May 1948	2,262	13,267	Barak		1 or 2 Jewish families	31°57′34″N 34°50′58″E	Zerifin and Nir Zevi
al-Maliha	Jerusalem		15 July 1948	2,250	6,828	Danny		3 or more Jewish families	31°45′08″N 35°10′55″E	
al-Shaykh Muwannis	Jaffa		30 March 1948	2,239	15,972		Atrocity	3 or more Jewish families	32°06′50″N 34°48′15″E	Tel Aviv
az-Zeeb	Acre		14 May 1948	2,216	12,607		Military assault	Some houses	33°02′57″N 35°06′08″E	
al-Mujaydil	Nazareth		15 July 1948	2,204	18,836	Dekel		Rubble	32°40′40″N 35°14′31″E	Migdal HaEmek, Yifat
Abu Kishk	Jaffa		30 March 1948	2,204	18,470			Some houses	32°8′11″N 34°51′55″E	Herzliya
Khirbat al-Wa'ra al-Sawda'	Tiberias		18 April 1948	2,169	7,036	Dekel	Massacre	Some walls	32°50′02″N 35°28′51″E	
al-Khalisa	Safad		11 May 1948	2,134	11,280	Yiftach		Some houses	33°12′52″N 35°34′02″E	Kiryat Shemona
Dayr Tarif	Ramle		10 July 1948	2,030	8,756	Danny	Atrocity	Rubble	31°59′26″N 34°56′23″E	Beit Arif
al-Maghar	Ramle		18 May 1948	2,018	15,390	Barak		3 or more Jewish families	31°50′19″N 34°46′56″E	Beit Elazari
al-Qubayba	Ramle		27 May 1948	1,995	10,737	Barak		1 or 2 Jewish families	31°53′41″N 34°46′17″E	Ge'alya; Kfar Gevirol; Kefar Hanaggid is near settlement land, but located on land belonging to Yibna
Sabbarin	Haifa		12 May 1948	1,972	25,307	Mishmar HaEmek	Massacre	Rubble	32°34′16″N 35°1′23″E	Ramot Menashe, Amikam
al-Walaja	Jerusalem		21 October 1948	1,914	17,708	Ha-Har		Some houses	31°43′53″N 35°09′49″E	Amminadav
Bashshit	Ramle		13 May 1948	1,879	18,553			1 or 2 Jewish families	31°49′27″N 34°44′48″E	Neve Mivtah Meshar, Kfar Mordechai, Misgav Dov, Kannot, Shedema, and Aseret.
Hunin	Safad		3 May 1948	1,879	14,224	Yiftach	Massacre	Rubble	33°12′52″N 35°32′41″E	Misgav Am Margaliot
Wadi Hunayn	Ramle		17 April 1948	1,879	5,401	Nachshon		1 or 2 Jewish families	31°55′39″N 34°47′43″E	Israel Institute for Biological Research, Nes Tziyyona,
Arab al Bashatwi	Beisan		16 May 1948	1,810	20,739			No trace		
Majdal Yaba	Ramle		13 July 1948	1,763	26,632	Danny		Rubble	32°04′51.04″N 34°57′24.97″E	Rosh HaAyin, Givat HaShlosha, Nahshonim, Migdal Afek
al-Salihiyya	Safad		25 May 1948	1,763	5,607	Yiftach		No trace	33°10′02″N 35°36′45″E	
Jimzu	Ramle		10 July 1948	1,752	9,681	Danny		Some walls	31°55′51″N 34°56′47″E	Moshav Gimzo
Jiddin	Acre		1 July 1948	1,740	7,587			Rubble	32°59′40″N 35°13′19″E	Yehiam, Kiryat, and Ga'aton
al-Tantura	Haifa		21 May 1948	1,728	14,520		Massacre	Some houses	32°36′34″N 34°55′04″E	Nahsholim,Dor
Umm az-Zinat	Haifa		15 May 1948	1,705	22,156	Bi’ur Hametz		Rubble	32°38′50″N 35°03′47.8″E	Eliakim
al-Na'ani	Ramle		14 May 1948	1,705	16,129	Barak		Some houses	31°52′20″N 34°52′24″E	Na'an, Ramot Me'ir
al-Birwa	Acre		11 June 1948	1,694	13,542	Ben-Ami/Dekel	Military assault	Some houses	32°54′19″N 35°10′49″E	Ahihud, Yas'ur
al-Nabi Rubin	Ramle		1 June 1948	1,647	31,002	Barak		Some houses	31°55′46″N 34°44′02″E	Palmachim, Gan Sorek
Zir'in	Jenin	Photo of the village or town	28 May 1948	1,647	23,920			Rubble	32°33′27″N 35°19′40″E	Yizre'el
al-Khayriyya	Jaffa		25 April 1948	1,647	13,672	Hametz		Some houses	32°2′14″N 34°49′41″E	Ramat Pinkas Ariel Sharon Park
Innaba	Ramle		10 July 1948	1,647	12,857	Danny		Rubble	31°54′08″N 34°56′52″E	Kefar Shemu'el
Karatiyya	Gaza		17 July 1948	1,589	13,709		Atrocity	Rubble	31°38′37″N 34°43′33″E	Komemiyut, Revaha, Nehora
al-Damun	Acre		15 July 1948	1,520	20,357	Dekel	Military assault	Rubble	32°52′37″N 35°10′59″E	
Ni'ilya	Gaza		4 November 1948	1,520	5,233	Yoav		Some houses	31°38′46″N 34°34′18″E	Ashkelon
Tell es-Safi	Hebron		9 July 1948	1,496	28,925	An-Far		Some walls	31°41′59″N 34°50′49″E	
Simsim	Gaza		13 May 1948	1,496	16,797		Massacre	Rubble	31°34′02″N 34°36′26″E	Gvar'am
al-Tira	Ramle		10 July 1948	1,496	6,956	Danny		3 or more Jewish families	32°01′02″N 34°56′35″E	Tirat Yehuda, Giv'at Ko'ah, Bareket
Kafr Saba	Tulkarm		15 May 1948	1,473	9,688			Some houses	32°10′52″N 34°56′14″E	Hak'ramim, Beit Berl, Kfar Saba, Neve Yamin
al-Sindiyana	Haifa		12 May 1948	1,450	15,172	Mishmar HaEmek		Rubble	32°33′24″N 35°0′08″E	Aviel
Ghuwayr Abu Shusha	Tiberias		21 April 1948	1,438	12,098			Rubble	32°51′13″N 35°30′34″E	Ginosar, Livnim
al-Ghabisiyya	Acre		1 May 1948	1,438	11,786	Ben-Ami	Atrocity	Rubble	33°00′02″N 35°09′00″E	Netiv HaShayara
Ajanjul	Ramle		12 July 1948	1,438	11,401	Danny		Rubble	31°52′17″N 35°01′26″E	
Amqa	Acre		10 July 1948	1,438	6,068	Dekel	Military assault	Rubble	32°58′46″N 35°9′48″E	
al-Jiyya	Gaza		4 November 1948	1,427	8,506	Yoav		No trace	31°37′38″N 34°35′51″E	Beit Shikma, Ge'a
al-'Abisiyya	Safad		25 May 1948	1,415	15,429	Yiftach		No trace	33°11′55″N 35°37′59″E	Kfar Szold
Qatra	Ramle		17 May 1948	1,404	7,853			Some houses	31°49′18.9″N 34°46′39.1″E	Gedera and Kidron
al-Mansi	Haifa		12 April 1948	1,392	12,272	Mishmar HaEmek	Atrocity	Some walls	32°35′42″N 35°10′22″E	Midrakh Oz
Fajja	Jaffa		15 May 1948	1,392	4,919		Atrocity	Some houses	32°05′18″N 34°54′16″E	Petah Tikva
Hittin	Tiberias	Photo of the village or town	16 July 1948	1,380	22,764	Dekel		Rubble	32°48′25″N 35°27′12″E	Arbel, Kefar Zetim
az-Zakariyya	Hebron		1 June 1950	1,369	15,320			3 or more Jewish families	31°42′30″N 34°56′50″E	Zekharia
Jusayr	Gaza		17 July 1948	1,369	12,361			Some houses	31°39′25″N 34°46′15″E	Menuha, Wardon
al-Muzayri'a	Ramle		12 July 1948	1,346	10,822	Danny		Rubble	32°02′57″N 34°56′58″E	Mazor Nechalim El'ad
al-Ja'una	Safad		9 May 1948	1,334	839	Yiftach		3 or more Jewish families	32°58′18″N 35°31′58″E	Rosh Pinna
Jaba'	Haifa		24 July 1948	1,322	7,012	Shoter		Rubble	32°39′05″N 34°57′43″E	Geva Karmel
Saidiyeen Bedouin	Beersheba		1 May 1950	1,312	1,238,375					
Suhmata	Acre		30 October 1948	1,311	17,056	Hiram	Military assault	Some walls	33°00′19″N 35°18′14″E	Tzuriel, Hosen
Sa'sa'	Safad		30 October 1948	1,311	14,796	Hiram	Massacre	3 or more Jewish families	33°01′43″N 35°23′40″E	Sasa
Naghnaghiya	Haifa		12 April 1948	1,311	12,139	Mishmar HaEmek	Atrocity	Rubble	32°36′12.2″N 35°09′26.9″E’	
Lajjun	Jenin		30 May 1948	1,279	77,242	Gideon	Massacre	Some houses	32°34′29″N 35°10′40″E	Kibbutz Megiddo
Saqiya	Jaffa		25 April 1948	1,276	5,850			3 or more Jewish families	32°01′44″N 34°50′35″E	Or Yehuda
al-Jammasin al-Gharbi	Jaffa		17 March 1948	1,253	1,365			3 or more Jewish families	32°05′34″N 34°47′50″E	
Yasur	Gaza		9 June 1948	1,241	16,390			Some houses	31°45′56″N 34°44′53″E	Talmei Yehiel, Bnei Ayish
Saliha	Safad		30 October 1948	1,241	11,735	Hiram	Massacre	Some houses	33°04′31″N 35°28′20″E	Yir'on and Avivim
al-Qubayba	Hebron		28 October 1948	1,230	11,912	Yoav		No trace	31°34′14″N 34°51′16″E	Lakhish
Bayt Tima	Gaza		18 October 1948	1,230	11,032	Yoav	Massacre	Rubble	31°37′24″N 34°38′21″E	
al-Zuq al-Tahtani	Safad		11 May 1948	1,218	11,634	Yiftach		Some houses	33°12′54″N 35°36′04″E	Beyt Hillel
Kuwaykat	Acre		10 July 1948	1,218	4,733	Dekel	Military assault	Rubble	32°58′16″N 35°08′48″E	Beit HaEmek
Sarafand al-Kharab	Ramle		20 April 1948	1,206	5,503	Nachshon		1 or 2 Jewish families	31°56′11″N 34°48′20″E	Ness Ziona
Ehewat Bedouin	Beersheba		1 May 1950	1,200	1,728,935					
Julis	Gaza		11 June 1948	1,195	13,584			1 or 2 Jewish families	31°40′54″N 34°39′13″E	Hodaya
al-Sawafir al-Gharbiyya	Gaza		18 May 1948	1,195	7,523	Barak		No trace	31°41′57″N 34°42′11″E	Merkaz Shapira, Masu'ot Yitzhak,
al-Na'ima	Safad		14 May 1948	1,195	7,155	Yiftach		No trace	33°11′17″N 35°35′42″E	Neot Mordechai, Kefar Blum, and Beyt Hillel
al-Ghazzawiyya	Beisan		20 May 1948	1,183	18,408			No trace	32°30′08″N 35°32′30″E	
Qula	Ramle		10 July 1948	1,172	4,347		Massacre	Rubble	32°02′15″N 34°57′12″E	
Tarbikha	Acre		1 November 1948	1,160	18,563	Hiram	Expulsion	3 or more Jewish families	33°04′58″N 35°17′04″E	Shomera, Even Menachem, Shtula, Zar'it
al-Batani al-Gharbi	Gaza		13 May 1948	1,137	4,574	Barak		Rubble	31°45′29″N 34°41′58″E	
al-Sawafir al-Sharqiyya	Gaza		18 May 1948	1,125	13,831	Barak		No trace	31°42′00″N 34°42′45″E	Ein Tzurim, Shafir, Zrahia, Nir Banim
Hatta	Gaza		17 July 1948	1,125	5,305			Rubble	31°39′06″N 34°44′28″E	Zavdiel, Aluma
Umm Khalid	Tulkarm		20 March 1948	1,125	2,894			3 or more Jewish families	32°19′51″N 34°51′55″E	Netanya
Qumbaza	Haifa		15 February 1948	1,114	31,786		Massacre, atrocity	Some houses	32°37′55″N 35°1′34″E	Kerem Maharal
Zikrin	Hebron		22 October 1948	1,114	17,195	Yoav	Atrocity	Rubble	31°39′48″N 34°51′38″E	
Alma	Safad		30 October 1948	1,102	19,498	Hiram		Some walls	33°3′20″N 35°29′28″E	Alma
Summil	Gaza		8 July 1948	1,102	19,304			Some walls	31°39′56″N 34°47′43″E	Kedma, Sgula, Menuha, Nahala, Vardon
Qazaza	Ramle		9 July 1948	1,090	18,829	An-Far	Atrocity		31°46′44″N 34°52′34″E	Israel Defense Forces base
Bayt Jirja	Gaza		30 October 1948	1,090	8,481	Yoav		Some houses	31°36′11″N 34°34′51″E	
Qaytiyya	Safad		19 May 1948	1,090	5,390	Yiftach		Rubble	33°11′59″N 35°36′46″E	Kfar Blum, possibly Beit Hillel
al-Kafrayn	Haifa		12 April 1948	1,067	10,882	Mishmar HaEmek		Rubble	32°34′25″N 35°07′08″E	
Safsaf	Safad		29 October 1948	1,056	7,391	Hiram	Massacre	Some houses	33°00′42″N 35°26′44″E	Kfar Hoshen, Bar Yohai
Qalunya	Jerusalem		3 April 1948	1,056	4,844	Nachshon		1 or 2 Jewish families	31°47′39″N 35°9′27″E	Mevaseret Zion
Qastina	Gaza		9 July 1948	1,032	12,019			Rubble	31°44′21″N 34°45′44″E	Kfar Warburg, Arugot, Kfar Ahim, Avigdor, Kiryat Malakhi
Barqa	Gaza		13 May 1948	1,032	5,206			Some houses	31°46′39″N 34°41′59″E	
Mallaha	Safad		25 May 1948	1,032	2,168	Yiftach		Rubble	33°05′24″N 35°34′55″E	
Miska	Tulkarm		20 April 1948	1,021	8,076			Rubble	32°13′04″N 34°55′29″E	Sde Warburg, Mishmeret
Abu Shusha	Ramle		14 May 1948	1,009	9,425	Barak	Abu Shusha Massacre	No trace	31°51′25″N 34°54′56″E	
al-'Ubaydiyya	Tiberias		3 March 1948	1,009	5,173			Some walls	32°41′00″N 35°33′00″E	
al-Mas'udiyya	Jaffa		25 December 1947	986				Some houses	32°05′07″N 34°46′54″E	Tel Aviv
al-Zanghariyya	Safad		4 May 1948	974	27,918	Matateh/Yiftach		Some walls	32°56′29″N 35°35′10″E	Elifelet
Arab al-Nufay'at	Haifa		10 April 1948	951	8,937			Some houses	32°25′23″N 34°52′54″E	Mikhmoret
Ayn al-Zaytun	Safad	Photo of the village or town	2 May 1948	951	1,100	Yiftach	Ein al-Zeitun massacre, atrocity	Some houses	32°59′14″N 35°29′30″E	
Sirin	Beisan		6 April 1948	940	28,445			Some houses	32°39′15″N 35°30′25″E	
Huj	Gaza		31 May 1948	940	21,988			Some houses	31°30′35″N 34°37′21″E	Dorot Havat Shikmim
al-Manshiyya	Acre		14 May 1948	940	14,886	Ben-Ami	Military assault	1 or 2 Jewish families	32°56′06″N 35°05′26″E	Shomrat, Bustan HaGalil
al-Sawalima	Jaffa		30 March 1948	928	5,942			No trace	32°06′59″N 34°50′51″E	Neve Sharett
Umm al-Faraj	Acre		21 May 1948	928	825		Massacre, military assault	Rubble	33°00′18″N 35°07′16″E	Ben Ami
Mi'ar	Acre		15 July 1948	893	10,788	Dekel		Some walls	32°52′27″N 35°14′47″E	Segev, Ya'ad Manof
al-Shajara	Tiberias		6 May 1948	893	3,754			Rubble	32°45′16″N 35°23′56″E	Ilaniya
Tall al-Turmus	Gaza		9 July 1948	882	11,508	An-Far		Rubble	31°43′30″N 34°46′22″E	Timorim
al-Sumayriyya	Acre		14 May 1948	882	8,542	Ben-Ami	Military assault	Some walls	32°58′19″N 35°05′36″E	Lohamei HaGeta'ot, Shomrat
al-Haditha	Ramle		12 July 1948	882	7,110	Danny		Some houses	31°57′48″N 34°57′07″E	
Zawiya	Safad		24 May 1948	882	3,958	Yiftach		No trace	33°09′19″N 35°35′50″E	Neot Mordechai
Qannir	Haifa		25 April 1948	870	11,331		Atrocity	Rubble	32°31′42″N 35°01′51″E	Regavim
al-Tina	Ramle		8 July 1948	870	7,001	An-Far		Rubble	31°44′48″N 34°49′11″E	
Khirbat Umm Sabuna	Beisan		21 May 1948	868		Gideon		Rubble	32°35′10″N 35°32′32″E	
Ghabat Kafr Sur	Tulkarm		15 May 1948	858	19,666			Some houses	32°17′02″N 34°52′03″E	Beit Yehoshua, Kfar Neter, Tel Yitzhaq
Fir'im	Safad		26 May 1948	858	2,191	Yiftach		Rubble	32°59′07″N 35°31′59″E	Hatzor HaGlilit
al-Hamra	Beisan		31 May 1948	847	11,511			No trace	32°25′40″N 35°30′01″E	
Deir al-Dubban	Hebron		23 October 1948	847	7,784	Yoav		Rubble	31°40′23″N 34°53′33″E	Luzit, Britannia Park
Barfiliya	Ramle		14 July 1948	847	7,134	Danny			31°54′36″N 34°59′22″E	
Dayr Sunayd	Gaza		30 October 1948	847	6,081	Yoav		Some houses	31°34′28″N 34°33′18″E	
al-Jammasin al-Sharqi	Jaffa		17 March 1948	847	358			Some houses	32°05′54″N 34°49′44″E	
al-Burayj	Jerusalem		19 October 1948	835	19,080	Ha-Har			31°44′20″N 34°55′44″E	Sdot Micha, Sdot Micha Airbase
Awlam	Tiberias		12 May 1948	835	18,546			Rubble	32°39′59″N 35°29′57″E	
Abu Shusha	Haifa		9 April 1948	835	8,960	Mishmar HaEmek		Rubble	32°36′51″N 35°08′17″E	Mishmar HaEmek
Kafr Bir'im	Safad	Photo of the village or town	4 November 1948	824	12,250	Hiram		Some walls	33°02′37″N 35°24′51″E	Bar'am, Dovev
Bayt 'Affa	Gaza		10 January 1948	812	5,808			No trace	31°39′41″N 34°42′24″E	
al-Dawwara	Safad		25 May 1948	812	5,470	Yiftach		No trace	33°10′43″N 35°38′02″E	‘Amir, Sde Nehemia
Ma'alul	Nazareth		15 July 1948	800	4,698	Dekel		Rubble	32°41′44″N 35°14′22″E	Migdal HaEmek, Kfar HaHoresh, Timrat, and an Israeli military base
Kawkaba	Gaza		12 May 1948	789	8,542	Barak/Yoav		Some walls	31°37′51″N 34°39′46″E	Kokhav Michael
al-Sawafir al-Shamaliyya	Gaza		18 May 1948	789	5,861	Barak		Rubble	31°42′48″N 34°42′15″E	
al-Farradiyya	Safad		1 February 1949	777	19,747	Hiram		Rubble	32°55′54″N 35°25′42″E	Parod, Shefer
Iraq Suwaydan	Gaza		9 November 1948	766	7,529	Yoav		No trace	31°38′55″N 34°41′19″E	Yad Natan, Otzem, Sde Yoav
al-Butayha	Safad		4 May 1948	754	16,690	Matateh/Yiftach		Some walls	32°54′59″N 35°37′22″E	Almagor
Ayn Hawd	Haifa	Photo of the village or town	15 July 1948	754	12,605			3 or more Jewish families	32°42′05″N 34°58′48″E	Ein Hod Nir Etzion
Arab al-Safa	Beisan		20 May 1948	754	12,518			No trace	32°26′27″N 35°32′16″E	
al-Batani al-Sharqi	Gaza		13 May 1948	754	5,764	Barak		Rubble	31°45′07″N 34°43′24″E	
Khirbat al-Sarkas	Haifa		15 April 1948	751				No trace	32°26′49″N 34°57′37″E	Gan Shmuel, Talmei Elazar
Lid	Haifa		9 April 1948	742	13,572			Rubble	32°36′49″N 35°13′27″E	HaYogev
Najd	Gaza		13 May 1948	719	13,576			Some walls	31°33′02″N 34°35′55″E	Sderot, Or HaNer
Indur	Nazareth		24 May 1948	719	12,444			Some walls	32°38′11″N 35°22′53″E	
Ras Abu 'Ammar	Jerusalem		21 October 1948	719	8,342	Ha-Har		Rubble	31°44′17″N 35°05′25″E	Tzur Hadassah
al-Ras al-Ahmar	Safad		30 October 1948	719	7,934	Hiram		1 or 2 Jewish families	33°2′28″N 35°27′52″E	Kerem Ben Zimra
Ishwa	Jerusalem		18 July 1948	719	5,522			3 or more Jewish families	31°46′50″N 35°00′40″E	Eshtaol
Suba	Jerusalem		13 July 1948	719	4,102	Danny		Some walls	31°47′5″N 35°7′26″E	Tzova, Yedida school
Arab Ghawarina / Jidru	Haifa		15 April 1948	719	3,428					
Arab Zahrat al-Dumayri	Haifa		10 April 1948	719	1,387			No trace	32°27′31″N 34°54′24″E	
al-Nahr	Acre		21 May 1948	708	5,261		Massacre, military assault	Some houses	33°00′26″N 35°08′29″E	Ben Ami, Kabri
Deir Yassin	Jerusalem	Photo of the village or town	9 April 1948	708	2,857		Deir Yassin massacre	3 or more Jewish families	31°47′9″N 35°10′41″E	Givat Shaul Beth and Har Nof neighborhoods of Jerusalem
Yajur	Haifa		25 April 1948	708	2,720			No trace	32°45′31″N 35°03′26″E	Yagur
Dayr Nakhkhas	Hebron		29 October 1948	696	14,476	Yoav		Some houses	31°36′57″N 34°55′18″E	
Dayshum	Safad		30 October 1948	684	23,044	Hiram		Rubble	33°04′49″N 35°30′26″E	Dishon
Rantiya	Jaffa		10 July 1948	684	4,389	Danny		Some houses	32°2′40″N 34°55′17″E	Mazor, Nofekh, Rinatia
al-Muharraqa	Gaza		27 May 1948	673	4,855			Rubble	31°28′01″N 34°36′41″E	Yakhini
Nuris	Jenin		29 May 1948	661	6,256			Rubble	32°32′06″N 35°21′49″E	
Saris	Jerusalem		16 April 1948	650	10,699	Nachshon		Rubble	31°47′53″N 35°04′26″E	Shoresh, Sho'eva, Neve Ilan
Bayt Jiz	Ramle		30 May 1948	638	8,357			Some houses	31°48′46″N 34°57′15″E	Har'el, Tzelafon, Gizo
Abu Zurayq	Haifa		12 April 1948	638	6,493	Mishmar HaEmek	Massacre	No trace	32°38′03″N 35°07′34″E	
Mughallis	Hebron		9 July 1948	626	11,459	An-Far		Rubble	31°43′45″N 34°52′57″E	Gefen
Bayt 'Itab	Jerusalem		21 October 1948	626	8,757	Ha-Har		Some walls	31°44′06″N 35°03′11″E	Nes Harim
Ibdis	Gaza		8 July 1948	626	4,593			No trace	31°40′39″N 34°41′55″E	
Sataf	Jerusalem		13 July 1948	626	3,775	Danny		Some walls	31°46′9″N 35°7′38″E	
Taytaba	Safad		1 May 1948	615	8,453	Yiftach		Rubble	33°00′48″N 35°28′43″E	
al-Masmiyya al-Saghira	Gaza		8 July 1948	615	6,478	An-Far		No trace	31°45′10″N 34°47′56″E	Masmiya Bet, Kfar HaRif
al-Sakhina	Beisan		12 May 1948	615	6,400	Gideon		No trace	32°30′59″N 35°27′44″E	Nir David
Arab al-Bawati	Beisan		16 May 1948	603	10,641			Rubble	32°31′41″N 35°32′21″E	
Hadatha	Tiberias		12 May 1948	603	10,310			Rubble	32°40′53″N 35°29′34″E	
Dimra	Gaza		28 October 1948	603	8,492	Yoav		Rubble	31°33′32″N 34°33′54″E	Erez
al-Haram	Jaffa		3 February 1948	603	8,065			3 or more Jewish families	32°11′17.40″N 34°48′24.13″E	
al-Buwayziyya	Safad		11 May 1948	592	14,620	Yiftach		Rubble	33°09′22″N 35°34′13″E	
Bir Ma'in	Ramle		15 July 1948	592	9,319	Danny		Some walls	31°53′17″N 35°01′08″E	Makkabim
Salbit	Ramle		15 July 1948	592	6,111	Danny		No trace	31°52′10″N 34°59′11″E	Shaalvim
Abu al-Fadl	Ramle		9 May 1948	592	2,870	Barak	Atrocity	Some houses	31°56′37″N 34°50′53″E	Sitria Talmey Menashe
al-Barriyya	Ramle		10 July 1948	592	2,831	Danny		Some houses	31°53′14″N 34°54′58″E	Azarya, Beyt Chashmonay
Kawfakha	Gaza		25 May 1948	580	8,569			Rubble	31°28′42″N 34°39′42″E	Nir Akiva
Iqrit	Acre		1 November 1948	568	24,722		Expulsion	Rubble	33°04′32″N 35°16′31″E	Shomera, Even Menachem, Goren, Gornot ha-Galil
Idnibba	Ramle		9 July 1948	568	8,103			Rubble	31°44′32″N 34°51′22″E	Kfar Menahem
al-Manara	Tiberias		1 March 1948	568	6,797			Rubble	32°45′17″N 35°32′32″E	
Mughr al-Khayt	Safad		2 May 1948	568	6,627	Yiftach		Some houses	32°59′19″N 35°32′17″E	Chatzor ha-Gelilit and Ro'sh Pinna
Ma'dhar	Tiberias		12 May 1948	557	11,666			Rubble	32°41′35″N 35°27′51″E	Kefar Qish
Kafr Sabt	Tiberias		22 April 1948	557	9,850			Rubble	32°44′37″N 35°26′27″E	Sdeh Ilan, Ilaniya Sharona
Umm ash Shauf	Haifa		12 May 1948	557	7,426	Mishmar HaEmek	Massacre	Rubble	32°33′12″N 35°02′55″E	Givat Nili
al-Burj	Ramle		15 July 1948	557	4,708	Danny		Some walls	31°54′07″N 35°01′20″E	Kfar Rut
Ijlil al-Qibliyya	Jaffa		3 April 1948	545	15,207			Some houses	32°09′36″N 34°48′42″E	
al-Khisas	Safad		25 May 1948	545	4,795	Yiftach	Massacre	Some houses	33°13′30.59″N 35°37′10.00″E	HaGoshrim
al-Murassas	Beisan		16 May 1948	534	14,477			No trace	32°33′38″N 35°28′25″E	
Qabba'a	Safad		26 May 1948	534	13,817	Yiftach		Rubble	32°59′55″N 35°32′17″E	
Dayr Muhaysin	Ramle		6 April 1948	534	10,008	Nachshon		Rubble	31°49′37″N 34°55′56″E	Beqoa'
Khirbat Bayt Lid	Tulkarm		5 April 1948	534	5,336	d		No trace	32°19′04″N 34°53′33″E	Nordia
Kudna	Hebron		22 October 1948	522	15,744	Yoav		Rubble	31°38′42″N 34°53′40″E	Beit Nir Britannia Park
al-Lawz	Jerusalem		13 July 1948	522	4,502	Danny		Rubble	31°46′04″N 35°06′41″E	
Allar	Jerusalem		22 October 1948	510	12,356	Ha-Har		Some houses	31°43′26″N 35°03′45″E	Mata, Bar Giora
Qumya	Beisan		26 March 1948	510	4,898			Rubble	32°33′55″N 35°23′45″E	Ein Harod (Ihud)
Dayr Rafat	Jerusalem		18 July 1948	499	13,242	Danny		Rubble	31°46′27″N 34°57′31″E	Givat Shemesh
Kafra	Beisan		16 May 1948	499	9,172			Rubble	32°35′35″N 35°29′27″E	
Hulayqat	Gaza		12 May 1948	487	7,063			No trace	31°35′53″N 34°38′59″E	
al-Jura	Jerusalem		11 July 1948	487	4,158	Danny		Some houses	31°45′25″N 35°08′56″E	Ora
Jahula	Safad		1 May 1948	487	3,869	Yiftach		Rubble	33°07′29″N 35°34′02″E	
Bir Salim	Ramle		9 May 1948	476	3,401			No trace	31°55′33″N 34°49′41″E	Netzer Sereni
al-Dalhamiyya	Tiberias		15 April 1948	476	2,852			No trace	32°39′38″N 35°35′52″E	
Daniyal	Ramle		10 July 1948	476	2,808	Danny		1 or 2 Jewish families	31°55′52″N 34°55′45″E	Kfar Daniel
Qira	Haifa		1 March 1948	476	7			Rubble	32°38′42″N 35°06′09″E	Yokneam Moshava, Yokneam Illit, HaZore'a
Hawsha	Haifa		16 April 1948	464				Some walls	32°47′33″N 35°08′37″E	
Arab Suqrir	Gaza		25 May 1948	452	40,224	Barak/Nikayon	Atrocity	Some houses	31°49′31″N 34°39′28″E	Bnei Darom Netivot Nir Galim, Ashdod
Qadas	Safad		28 May 1948	452	14,139	Yiftach/Hiram		Some walls	33°06′43″N 35°31′39″E	Yiftah, Malkia, Ramot Naftali
al-Qudayriyya	Safad		4 May 1948	452	12,487	Matateh/Yiftach	Massacre	Some walls	32°54′09″N 35°30′25″E	Kahal
al-Samakiyya	Tiberias		4 May 1948	441	10,526	Matateh		Rubble	32°53′02″N 35°34′37″E	Amnun, Korazim
Beit Lahm	Haifa		1 April 1948	429	7,526				32°44′12″N 35°11′29″E	
Sajad	Ramle		1 June 1948	429	2,795	An-Far			31°47′01″N 34°53′34″E	Israeli military zone
Iribbin	Acre		30 October 1948	418	11,463	Hiram		Rubble	33°04′50″N 35°13′41″E	Adamit, Goren
Dallata	Safad		10 May 1948	418	9,074	Yiftach		Rubble	33°01′19″N 35°29′56″E	Dalton
Al-Malkiyya	Safad		28 May 1948	418	7,328	Yiftach			33°06′19″N 35°30′23″E	Malkiya
Kafr 'Inan	Acre		1 February 1949	418	5,827	Hiram	Expulsion	Some houses	32°55′23″N 35°25′07″E	Kfar Hananya
al-Jaladiyya	Gaza		8 July 1948	418	4,329			No trace	31°41′55″N 34°44′59″E	
al-Muwaylih	Jaffa		31 December 1947	418	3,342			Some houses	32°07′28″N 34°55′23″E	Neve Yarak
Kirad al-Baqqara	Safad		22 April 1948	418	2,262	Yiftach		Some walls	33°01′07″N 35°36′04″E	Gadot and Mishmar ha-Yarden
al-Mansura	Safad		25 May 1948	418	1,544	Yiftach		No trace	33°12′59″N 35°38′26″E	She'ar Yashuv
al-Majdal	Tiberias		22 April 1948	418	103			Rubble	32°49′28″N 35°31′00″E	Migdal, Israel
al-Muftakhira	Safad		16 May 1948	406	9,215	Yiftach		Rubble	33°09′25″N 35°38′35″E	Shamir, Israel
al-Zahiriyya al-Tahta	Safad		10 May 1948	406	6,773	Yiftach		Rubble	32°57′47″N 35°29′12″E	
Kirad al-Ghannama	Safad		22 April 1948	406	3,975	Yiftach		Rubble	33°01′05″N 35°37′02″E	Ayyelet ha-Shahar and Gadot
Artuf	Jerusalem		18 July 1948	406	403			1 or 2 Jewish families	31°46′03″N 35°00′05″E	Naham
Kafr Lam	Haifa		16 July 1948	394	6,838			1 or 2 Jewish families	32°38′15″N 34°56′04″E	HaBonim, Ein Ayala
Tulayl	Safad		28 April 1948	394	5,324	Yiftach		Some houses	33°03′03″N 35°37′12″E	
Sar'a	Jerusalem		18 July 1948	394	4,967			Rubble	31°46′41″N 34°59′10″E	Tarum
al-Dumun	Haifa		30 April 1948	394	2,797			Some houses	32°43′58″N 35°01′20″E	
Zayta	Hebron		17 July 1948	383	10,490	An-Far		No trace	31°38′25″N 34°49′25″E	
Jilya	Ramle		9 July 1948	383	10,347				31°46′06″N 34°51′52″E	
al-Tabigha	Tiberias		4 May 1948	383	5,389	Matateh	Massacre	Some walls	32°52′20″N 35°33′00″E	
Farwana	Beisan		11 May 1948	383	4,996			Some walls	32°27′47″N 35°29′37″E	Rechov Chawwat Eden
Abil al-Qamh	Safad		10 May 1948	383	4,615	Yiftach		Rubble	33°15′34″N 35°34′51″E	Yuval
Barqusya	Hebron		9 July 1948	383	3,216	An-Far	Massacre	Rubble	31°40′46″N 34°49′24″E	
al-Ruways	Acre		15 July 1948	383	1,163	Dekel		Rubble	32°51′50″N 35°10′41″E	
al-Nuqayb	Tiberias		15 May 1948	371	13,010			Some walls	32°47′57″N 35°38′25″E	Ein Gev
Nimrin	Tiberias		16 July 1948	371	12,019	Dekel			32°48′15″N 35°25′24″E	Achuzzat Naftali, IDF ammunition depot
Wadi Qabbani	Tulkarm		1 March 1948	371	9,812			No trace	32°21′44″N 34°55′08″E	HaOgen
Fara	Safad		30 October 1948	371	7,229	Hiram		Some houses	33°03′57″N 35°27′29″E	
Dayr Ayyub	Ramle		6 March 1948	371	6,028	various		Some walls	31°49′38″N 35°01′06.45″E	Canada Park
al-Sammu'i	Safad		12 May 1948	360	15,135	Yiftach		Some walls	32°57′29″N 35°27′11″E	
al-Dirbashiyya	Safad		1 May 1948	360	2,883	Yiftach		Rubble	33°05′20″N 35°38′49″E	
Arab al-Fuqara	Haifa		10 April 1948	360	2,714			No trace	32°27′08″N 34°54′21″E	Hadera
Kawkab al-Hawa	Beisan		16 May 1948	348	9,949	Gideon		No trace	32°35′43″N 35°31′12″E	
Bayt Far	Ramle		7 April 1948	348	5,604	Nachshon		Rubble	31°48′03″N 34°54′57″E	Tal Shahar
Biyar 'Adas	Jaffa		12 April 1948	348	5,492			Some houses	32°09′27″N 34°55′15″E	Adanim, Elishama
al-Tall	Acre		21 May 1948	348			Military assault	Rubble	33°00′31″N 35°08′19″E	
Meiron	Safad		10 May 1948	336	14,114	Yiftach		Some walls	32°58′56″N 35°26′17″E	Meron
al-Samra	Tiberias		21 April 1948	336	12,563			No trace	32°43′23″N 35°37′02″E	HaOn
Burayka	Haifa		5 May 1948	336	11,434	Mishmar HaEmek		Inaccessible	32°33′29″N 34°58′40″E	
al-Sarafand	Haifa		16 July 1948	336	5,409			Some houses	32°38′48″N 34°56′08″E	
Khubbayza	Haifa		12 May 1948	336	4,854	Mishmar HaEmek		Rubble	32°33′22″N 35°03′56″E	
al-Hamma	Tiberias		20 July 1949	336	1,692			Some houses	32°41′10″N 35°39′51″E	
Daliyat al-Rawha'	Haifa		1 March 1948	325	10,008			Rubble	32°35′28″N 35°04′41″E	Ramot Menashe? Dalia
Khulda	Ramle		6 April 1948	325	9,461	Nachshon		Some houses	31°49′10″N 34°54′14″E	Mishmar David
Kasla	Jerusalem		17 July 1948	325	8,004			Rubble	31°46′52″N 35°03′04″E	Ramat Raziel, Ksalon
Shahma	Ramle		14 May 1948	325	6,875				31°49′26″N 34°48′40″E	
Khiyam al-Walid	Safad		1 May 1948	325	4,215	Yiftach		Rubble	33°08′39″N 35°39′14″E	Lehavot HaBashan
al-Mazar	Jenin		30 May 1948	313	14,501			Rubble	32°31′28″N 35°21′33″E	Prazon, Meitav, and Gan Ner
al-'Umur	Jerusalem		21 October 1948	313	4,163			Rubble	31°47′37″N 35°05′56″E	Giv'at Ye'arim
al-Manshiyya	Tulkarm		15 April 1948	302	16,770			Rubble	32°26′57″N 34°59′57″E	Ein ha-Horesh, Giv'at Chayirn, and Ahituv
Umm al ‘Amad	Haifa		1 April 1948	302	9,225				32°43′46″N 35°10′18″E	
al-Bira	Beisan		16 May 1948	302	6,866			Some walls	32°36′29″N 35°30′14″E	
Umm 'Ajra	Beisan		31 May 1948	302	6,443			No trace	32°27′56″N 35°31′21″E	Shif’a
Bayt Thul	Jerusalem		1 April 1948	302	4,629	Nachshon		Some walls	31°49′21″N 35°04′26″E	Nataf, Neve Ilan
al-Qabu	Jerusalem		22 October 1948	302	3,806	Ha-Har		Rubble	31°43′40″N 35°07′10″E	Mevo Beitar
'Akbara	Safad		9 May 1948	302	3,224	Yiftach		Some houses	32°56′22″N 35°29′58″E	
al-Khunayzir	Beisan		20 May 1948	302	3,107			No trace	32°25′17″N 35°31′20″E	Tirat Zvi
Khan al-Duwayr	Safad		30 May 1948	302	2,163	Yiftach		No trace	33°14′22″N 35°40′19″E	
Islin	Jerusalem		18 July 1948	302	2,159	Danny		Some walls	31°47′05″N 35°00′23″E	Eshtaol
al-'Ulmaniyya	Safad		20 April 1948	302	1,169	Yiftach		No trace	33°04′24″N 35°35′20″E	
Jabbul	Beisan		18 May 1948	290	15,127			Rubble	32°34′01″N 35°30′35″E	
al-Samiriyya	Beisan		27 May 1948	290	3,873			Some walls	32°26′15″N 35°29′14″E	Sdei Trumot
Harrawi	Safad		25 May 1948	290	3,726	Yiftach		No trace	33°5′27″N 35°33′28″E	
Biriyya	Safad		2 May 1948	278	5,579	Matateh/Yiftach		3 or more Jewish families	32°58′47″N 35°29′52″E	Birya
Bayt Naqquba	Jerusalem		1 April 1948	278	2,979	Nachshon		3 or more Jewish families	31°48′16″N 35°07′25″E	Beit Nekofa
Qaddita	Safad		11 May 1948	278	2,441	Yiftach		Rubble	33°00′20″N 35°28′01″E	Kadita
al-Rihaniyya	Haifa		30 April 1948	278	1,930	Bi’ur Hametz		Rubble	32°37′12″N 35°05′13″E	Ramat HaShofet Ein HaEmek
Wadi Ara	Haifa	Photo of the village or town	27 February 1948	267	9,795			Some houses	32°28′31″N 35°01′55″E	Ein Iron, Barkai
al-Ashrafiyya	Beisan		12 May 1948	267	6,711	Gideon		No trace	32°28′12″N 35°28′17″E	
Lazzaza	Safad		21 May 1948	267	1,586	Yiftach		No trace	33°12′21″N 35°36′42″E	Beit Hillel
al-Hamidiyya	Beisan		12 May 1948	255	10,902			Rubble	32°32′39″N 35°30′56″E	
Dayr al-Shaykh	Jerusalem		21 October 1948	255	6,781	Ha-Har		Rubble	31°44′56″N 35°04′02″E	
Ghuraba	Safad		28 May 1948	255	3,453	Yiftach		Some walls	33°07′11″N 35°38′45″E	Gonen
Yaquq	Tiberias		1 May 1948	244	8,507			Rubble	32°53′5″N 35°28′44″E	Hukok
al-Mazar	Haifa		15 July 1948	244	7,976		Atrocity	Rubble	32°40′56″N 34°57′52″E	Ein Carmel
Khirbat Zalafa	Tulkarm		15 April 1948	244	7,713			No trace	32°24′9″N 34°56′44″E	
Saydun	Ramle		6 April 1948	244	7,487	Nachshon		Some houses	31°50′28″N 34°54′17″E	
Bayt Susin	Ramle		30 May 1948	244	6,481			Rubble	31°48′22″N 34°58′55″E	Ta'oz
Yubla	Beisan		16 May 1948	244	5,165			No trace	32°34′33″N 35°28′10″E	
Bayt Shanna	Ramle		15 July 1948	244	3,617			Some houses	31°52′39″N 34°59′13″E	
al-Mukhayzin	Ramle		20 April 1948	232	12,548	Nachshon		No trace	31°48′12″N 34°48′40″E	Chafetz Chayyim, Revadim, Yad Binyamin, Beyt Chilqiyya
Mansurat al-Khayt	Safad		18 January 1948	232	6,735		Massacre	Rubble	32°58′15″N 35°36′58″E	Kfar Hanassi? However, Khalidi writes that it is on the land of Tuba
al-Shawka al-Tahta	Safad		14 May 1948	232	2,132	Yiftach		Rubble	33°14′19″N 35°38′12″E	
Arab al-Samniyya	Acre		30 October 1948	232	1,872	Hiram	Massacre	Some houses	33°02′48″N 35°10′50″E	Ya'ara
al-Mansura	Haifa		28 April 1948	223		Bi’ur Hametz		No trace	32°40′28″N 35°05′59″E	
al-Latrun	Ramle	Photo of the village or town	10 August 1948	220	8,376	Danny/others		No trace	31°50′08″N 34°58′49″E	
Ra'na	Hebron		22 October 1948	220	6,925	Yoav		No trace	31°39′54″N 34°52′37″E	Gal On
Danna	Beisan		28 May 1948	220	6,614			Rubble	32°36′47″N 35°28′28″E	
al-Khayma	Ramle		9 July 1948	220	5,150	An-Far		No trace	31°45′41″N 34°49′39″E	
Jarash	Jerusalem		21 October 1948	220	3,518	Ha-Har		Rubble	31°43′47″N 35°00′58″E	
Ijlil al-Shamaliyya	Jaffa		3 April 1948	220	2,450			No trace	32°09′36″N 34°48′42″E	Glil Yam
al-Buwayra	Ramle		15 July 1948	220	1,150	Danny		Some walls	31°52′27″N 35°00′52″E	
Jarisha	Jaffa		1 May 1948	220	555			No trace	32°5′43″N 34°48′28″E	Tel Aviv, Ramat Gan
Wa'arat al-Sarris	Haifa		16 April 1948	220				3 or more Jewish families	32°48′50″N 35°07′08″E	
Bil'in	Gaza		8 July 1948	209	8,036	An-Far	Massacre	Rubble	31°41′20″N 34°49′11″E	Qedma
Jubb Yusuf	Safad		4 May 1948	197	11,325	Yiftach		No trace	32°55′09.19″N 35°32′12.63″E	
Zab'a	Beisan		12 May 1948	197	3,968	Gideon		No trace	32°33′15″N 35°32′55″E	Beyt Yosef Doshen
al-Shuna	Safad		30 April 1948	197	3,660	Yiftach		Some houses	32°54′30″N 35°29′13″E	
Kharruba	Ramle		12 July 1948	197	3,374	Danny		Rubble	31°54′44″N 34°57′38″E	
al-Mirr	Jaffa		1 February 1948	197	51			Some houses	32°06′43″N 34°54′57″E	
al-Zuq al-Fawqani	Safad		21 May 1948	186	1,832	Yiftach		Rubble	33°14′37″N 35°35′30″E	Yuval
al-Tira	Beisan		15 April 1948	174	10,207			Rubble	32°38′52″N 35°27′26″E	Gazit
'Atlit	Haifa		15 May 1948	174	9,083				32°41′14″N 34°56′18″E	
al-Khisas	Gaza		4 November 1948	174	6,269	Yoav		Rubble	31°38′53″N 34°33′40″E	Ashkelon
Arab al-'Arida	Beisan		20 May 1948	174	2,280			No trace	32°26′28″N 35°30′52″E	Sde Eliyahu
Raml Zayta	Tulkarm		15 March 1948	162	14,837			1 or 2 Jewish families	32°26′6″N 34°56′12″E	Sde Yitzhak, Chadera
Umm Burj	Hebron		28 October 1948	162	13,083	Yoav		Some walls	31°38′12″N 34°58′11″E	Nehusha
Ammuqa	Safad		24 May 1948	162	2,574	Yiftach		Rubble	33°00′22″N 35°31′13″E	Amuka
al-Sanbariyya	Safad		1 May 1948	151	2,532	Yiftach		No trace	33°14′05″N 35°37′07″E	Ma'yan Barukh and Dafna
Khirbat Sa'sa'	Haifa		28 April 1948	151				Some walls	32°46′27″N 35°07′49″E	
al-Manshiyya	Safad		24 May 1948	140		Yiftach		No trace	33°13′32″N 35°36′24″E	
Kabara	Haifa		30 April 1948	139	9,831			Rubble	32°32′56″N 34°55′14″E	Ma'ayan Tzvi, Ma'agan Michael, Beit Hanania
Tall al-Shawk	Beisan		12 May 1948	139	3,685			No trace	32°29′49″N 35°27′43″E	
al-Butaymat	Haifa		1 May 1948	128	8,557			Some walls	32°33′12″N 35°5′38″E	Gal'ed Former: Regavim
al-Fatur	Beisan		12 May 1948	128	729	Gideon		No trace	32°23′55″N 35°31′36″E	
al-Dirdara	Safad		30 April 1948	116	6,361	Yiftach		No trace	33°03′05″N 35°38′24″E	
Masil al-Jizl	Beisan		31 May 1948	116	5,873			No trace	32°27′15″N 35°33′26″E	Kfar Ruppin
Shilta	Ramle		18 July 1948	116	5,380	Danny		No trace	31°55′04″N 35°01′14″E	Shilat, Kfar Ruth
al-Wayziyya	Safad		1 May 1948	116	3,826	Yiftach		Rubble	33°0′4″N 35°34′37″E	
al-Duhayriyya	Ramle		10 July 1948	116	1,341			Some walls	31°56′46″N 34°56′03″E	
al-Mansura	Ramle		20 April 1948	104	2,328	Barak		No trace	31°50′16″N 34°51′26″E	
al-Qastal	Jerusalem		3 April 1948	104	1,446			Rubble	31°47′44″N 35°8′39″E	Mevaseret Zion Castel National Park
Ayn al-Mansi	Jenin		12 April 1948	104	1,295			No trace	32°35′36″N 35°10′38″E	
Nasir al-Din	Tiberias		12 April 1948	104			Massacre	No trace	32°46′43″N 35°31′24″E	Tiberias
Marus	Safad		26 May 1948	93	3,183	Hiram	Atrocity	Rubble	33°01′43.38″N 35°31′41.61″E	
al-Nabi Yusha'	Safad		16 May 1948	81	3,617	Yiftach		Rubble	33°06′46″N 35°33′22″E	Ramot Naftali
Sabalan	Safad		30 October 1948	81	1,798	Hiram		Some houses	33°0′42″N 35°20′29″E	
Bayt Umm al-Mays	Jerusalem		21 October 1948	81	1,013	Ha-Har		Some walls	31°46′52″N 35°04′55″E	
al-Jalama	Tulkarm		1 March 1948	81				Rubble	32°23′32″N 35°00′35″E	
Dayr al-Hawa	Jerusalem		19 October 1948	70	5,907	Ha-Har		Rubble	31°45′05″N 35°02′14″E	
Ghabbatiyya	Safad		30 October 1948	70	2,933	Hiram		Some walls	33°00′53″N 35°22′33″E	
Sufla	Jerusalem		19 October 1948	70	2,061	Ha-Har		Rubble	31°44′5″N 35°2′28″E	
Umm Kalkha	Ramle		7 April 1948	70	1,405	Nachshon		No trace	31°48′51″N 34°51′57″E	Yesodot
Dayr Abu Salama	Ramle		13 July 1948	70	1,195	Danny		Rubble	31°56′57″N 34°57′25″E	
Aqqur	Jerusalem		13 July 1948	46	5,522			Some walls	31°45′30″N 35°04′56″E	
al-Kunayyisa	Ramle		10 July 1948	46	3,872	Danny		Some walls	31°53′18″N 34°57′27″E	
Nitaf	Jerusalem		15 April 1948	46	1,401			Some houses	31°50′13″N 35°03′55″E	
al Zuwaira PS	Beersheba		25 November 1948	46		Uvda				
Al-Imara	Beersheba		13 May 1948	46				No trace	31°18′11″N 34°31′14″E	
al-Jammama	Beersheba		22 May 1948	46				Some walls	31°29′55″N 34°41′10″E	Ruhama
Al-Khalasa	Beersheba	Photo of the village or town	17 November 1948	46		Yoav		Some walls	31°5′50″N 34°39′9″E	
Asluj PS	Beersheba		26 December 1948	46		Yoav				
Auja al-Hafir	Beersheba		27 December 1948	46		Yoav			30°52′56″N 34°23′38″E	Nessana
Ghamr PS	Beersheba		5 March 1949	46		Uvda				
Kurnub PS	Beersheba		23 November 1948	46		Uvda			31.025°N 35.064°E	
Um Rashrash	Beersheba		10 March 1949	46		Uvda				
Baysamun	Safad		25 May 1948	23	2,102	Yiftach		No trace	33°5′51″N 35°34′46″E	
Yarda, Safad	Safad		1 April 1948	23	1,368	Yiftach		Some walls	33°0′27″N 35°35′38″E	Ayyelet ha-Shahar and Mishmar ha-Yarden
Fardisya	Tulkarm		1 April 1948	23	1,092			Some houses	32°16′41″N 35°00′47″E	Sha'ar Efraim
Ism Allah	Jerusalem		17 July 1948	23	568	Danny		1 or 2 Jewish families	31°46′59″N 34°57′19″E	
Dayr 'Amr	Jerusalem		17 July 1948	12	3,072	Danny		3 or more Jewish families	31°46′37″N 35°05′48″E	Eitanim
Abu Kabir	Jaffa		26 April 1948	incl.	incl.					Tel Aviv
al-Manara	Haifa		1 March 1948	incl.	incl.			Rubble		
al-'Urayfiyya	Safad		1 April 1948	incl.	incl.	Yiftach		No trace	33°06′38″N 35°38′53″E	
al-Ghubayya al-Fawqa	Haifa		8 April 1948	incl.	incl.	Mishmar HaEmek		Rubble	32°36′5″N 35°9′5″E	
al-Ghubayya al-Tahta	Haifa		8 April 1948	incl.	incl.	Mishmar HaEmek		No trace	32°36′27″N 35°8′38″E	Midrakh Oz
al-Hamra'	Safad		1 May 1948	incl.	incl.	Yiftach		Some walls	33°09′11″N 35°38′51″E	
al-Husayniyya	Safad		21 April 1948	incl.	incl.	Yiftach	Massacre	Some walls	33°02′23″N 35°34′58″E	
al-Manshiyya	Tiberias		3 March 1948	incl.	incl.			Rubble	32°41′33″N 35°33′29″E	Beit Zera
al-Mansura	Acre		1 November 1948	incl.	incl.	Hiram	Expulsion	No trace	33°03′50″N 35°20′05″E	Netu'a, Mattat, Abirim, Elkosh and Biranit
al-Nabi Rubin	Acre		1 November 1948	incl.	incl.			Rubble	33°04′49″N 35°17′29″E	Shomera, Even Menachem, Zar'it, Shtula
Arab al Zarra'a	Beisan		20 May 1948	incl.	incl.					
Arab al-Shamalina	Safad		4 May 1948	incl.	incl.	Yiftach		Rubble	32°54′13″N 35°36′08″E	Almagor
Arab al-Zubayd	Safad		20 April 1948	incl.	incl.	Yiftach		Rubble	33°4′44″N 35°34′03″E	
Barrat Qisarya	Haifa		15 May 1948	incl.	incl.			Some houses	32°30′34″N 34°55′00″E	Or Akiva
Bayyarat Hannun	Tulkarm		31 March 1948	incl.	incl.			Some houses	32°17′33″N 34°51′42″E	
Eilabun	Tiberias		29 October 1948	incl.	incl.	Hiram	Eilabun massacre		32°50′18″N 35°24′03″E	
Wadi Hamam	Tiberias		22 April 1948	incl.	incl.			Some walls	32°49′41.8″N 35°29′32.13″E	
al-Jawfa	Jenin		12 May 1948	incl.	incl.			Some walls	32°29′26″N 35°26′01″E	Ma'ale Gilboa
al-Kasayir	Haifa		16 April 1948	incl.	incl.			Rubble	32°47′36″N 35°08′19″E	
al-Majdal	Tulkarm		1 March 1948	incl.	incl.			No trace	32°23′39″N 34°56′15″E	
Khirbat Al-Manara	Haifa		21 May 1948	incl.	incl.			Rubble	32°38′44″N 34°57′52″E	Ofer Kerem Maharal
al-Sawamir	Haifa		22 May 1948	incl.	incl.			Some walls	32°37′43″N 34°57′30″E	Ofer
Khirbat al-Shuna	Haifa		15 March 1948	incl.	incl.			Some houses	32°32′05″N 34°56′51″E	
al-Tannur	Jerusalem		21 October 1948	incl.	incl.	Ha-Har		Some houses	31°42′50″N 35°02′50″E	Mata
al-Taqa	Beisan		15 May 1948	incl.	incl.	Gideon		No trace	32°36′42″N 35°32′14″E	
Khirbat Karraza	Safad		4 May 1948	incl.	incl.			Some houses	32°54′40″N 35°33′46″E	Chorazin and Amnon
Khirbat Ras ‘Ali	Haifa		1 April 1948	incl.	incl.				32°46′20″N 35°09′17″E	
al-Zawiya	Beisan		16 May 1948	incl.	incl.				32°35′50″N 35°32′26″E	
Madahil	Safad		30 April 1948	incl.	incl.	Matateh/Yiftach		No trace	33°12′18″N 35°38′30″E	
Majd al-Krum	Acre		29 October 1948	incl.	incl.	Hiram	Massacre		32°55′17″N 35°15′25″E	
Sheikh Badr	Jerusalem		28 April 1948	incl.	incl.				31°46′20.1″N 35°11′50.04″E	
Suruh	Acre		1 November 1948	incl.	incl.		Expulsion	Rubble	33°05′06″N 35°17′35″E	Shomera, Even Menachem, Kefar Rosenwald, Shtula
Jish	Safad		29 October 1948	incl.	12,430	Hiram	Massacre		33°1′19″N 35°26′47″E	
al-Zabadida	Tulkarm		15 May 1948	incl.	10,879			Some houses	32°15′11″N 34°50′14″E	Yakum, Ga'ash
Arab al Subeih	Nazareth		19 April 1948	incl.	8,686					
al-Jalama	Haifa		1 May 1948	incl.	7,713			Inaccessible	32°43′24″N 35°05′19″E	
Tabsur	Tulkarm		3 April 1948	incl.	5,328			No trace	32°11′36″N 34°52′38″E	Ra'anana and Batzra
al-Burj	Haifa		15 February 1948	incl.	5,291			Some walls	32°30′41″N 34°56′34″E	Binyamina
Khirbat Zakariyya	Ramle		12 July 1948	incl.	4,538			No trace	31°56′16″N 34°58′12″E	
Jindas	Ramle		12 July 1948	incl.	4,448					
al-Muntar	Safad		20 July 1949	incl.	52	Yiftach		Rubble	32°59′21″N 35°34′13″E	
Total	-		-	804,517	17,131,675	-				

== Other villages (not in table above) ==
=== Acre Subdistrict ===
- Sha'ab

=== Haifa Subdistrict ===
- Qisarya

=== Jerusalem Subdistrict ===
- Romema

== See also ==
- Nakba
- Causes of the 1948 Palestinian exodus
- Transfer Committee
- Plan Dalet
- Palestine refugee camps
- 1948 Palestinian exodus from Lydda and Ramle
- List of villages depopulated during the Arab–Israeli conflict
- Jewish exodus from Arab and Muslim countries
- Syrian towns and villages depopulated in the Arab–Israeli conflict
- Killings and massacres during the 1948 Palestine war
- List of battles and operations in the 1948 Palestine war
- List of ghost towns by country
