= Deganit Stern Schocken =

Israeli jewellery designer and art curator

Deganit Stern Schocken (Hebrew: דגנית שטרן שוקן; born 1947) is an Israeli jewellery designer and art curator.

Deganit Stern Schocken was born in Amir, Israel, a kibbutz in northern Israel. She earned a Bachelor of Fine Arts degree from Bezalel Academy of Art and Design in Jerusalem, and studied four years at the Sir John Cass College of Art and in the Middlesex Polytechnic in London.

She received the Alix de Rothschild Foundation Prize in 2001.

Her works are in the permanent collections of the Brooklyn Museum, New York, the Israel Museum in Jerusalem and the Museum of Fine Arts in Houston, Texas.

She was part of an exhibition called "Women's Tales: Four Leading Israeli Jewelers", a leading international collaboration between The Israel Museum in Jerusalem, and the Racine Art Museum in Wisconsin that traveled through the United States.

Stern Schocken was a founder and chairman of the jewelry department at Shenkar College of Engineering and Design in Ramat Gan. She is head of MA department of Shenkar College and on its teaching faculty.

== See also ==
- Visual arts in Israel
