= Madahil =

Madahil مداحل
- Village
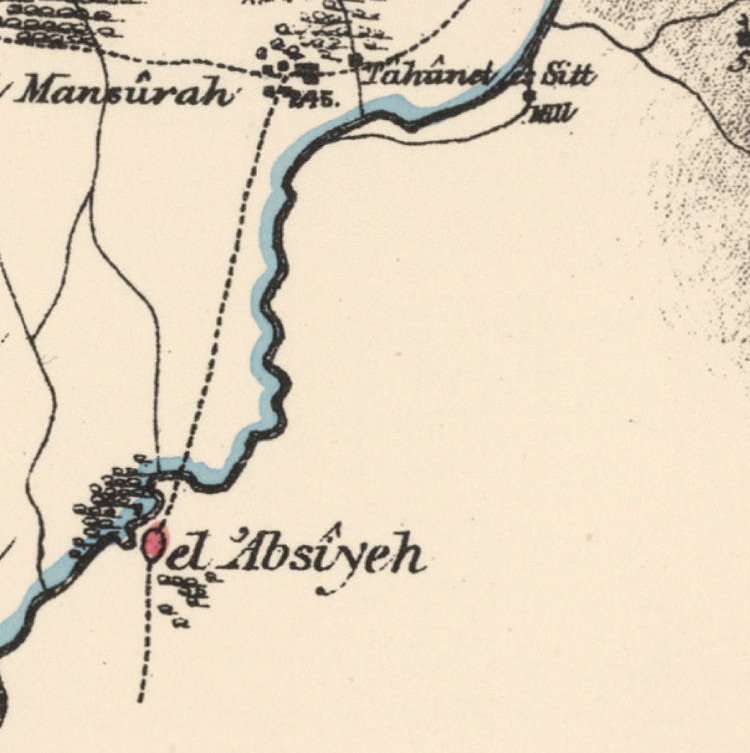
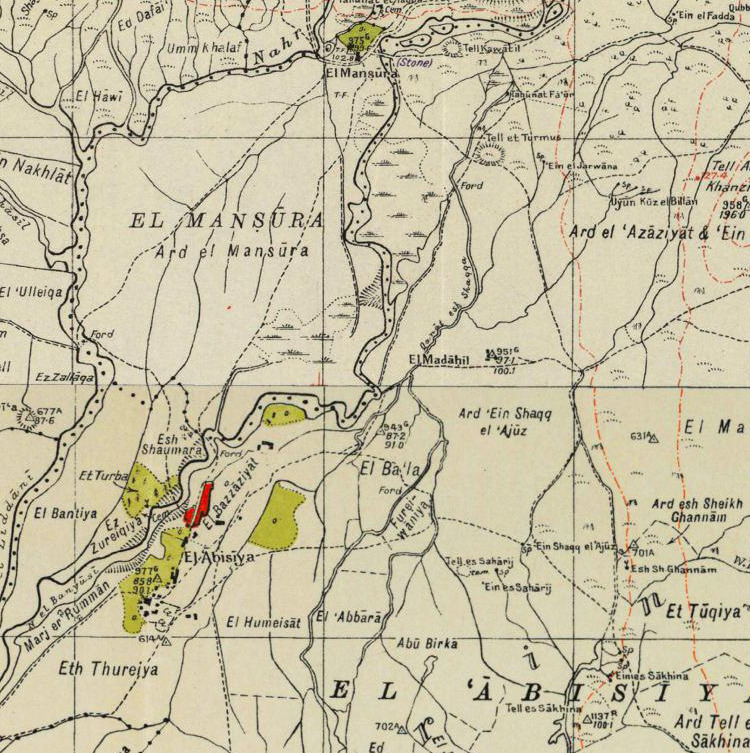
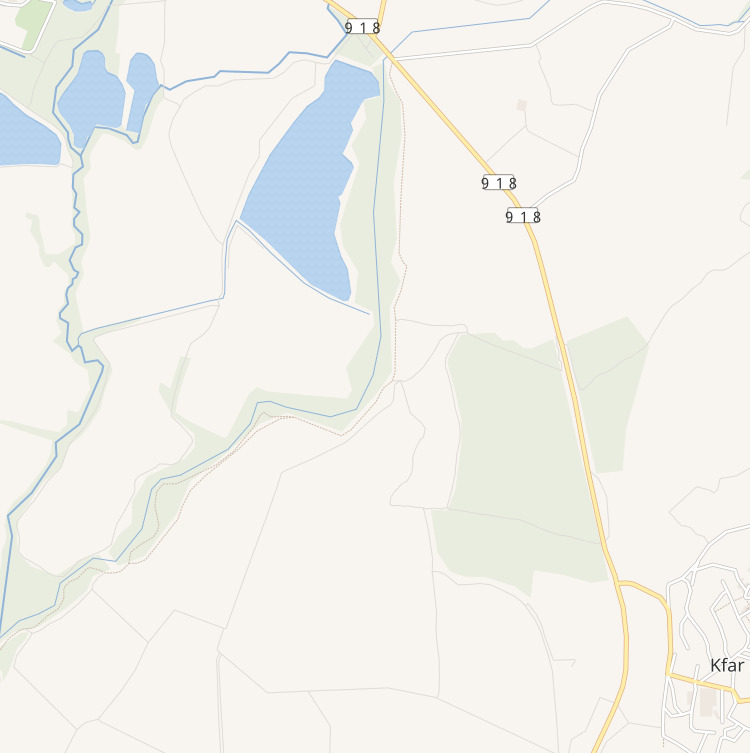
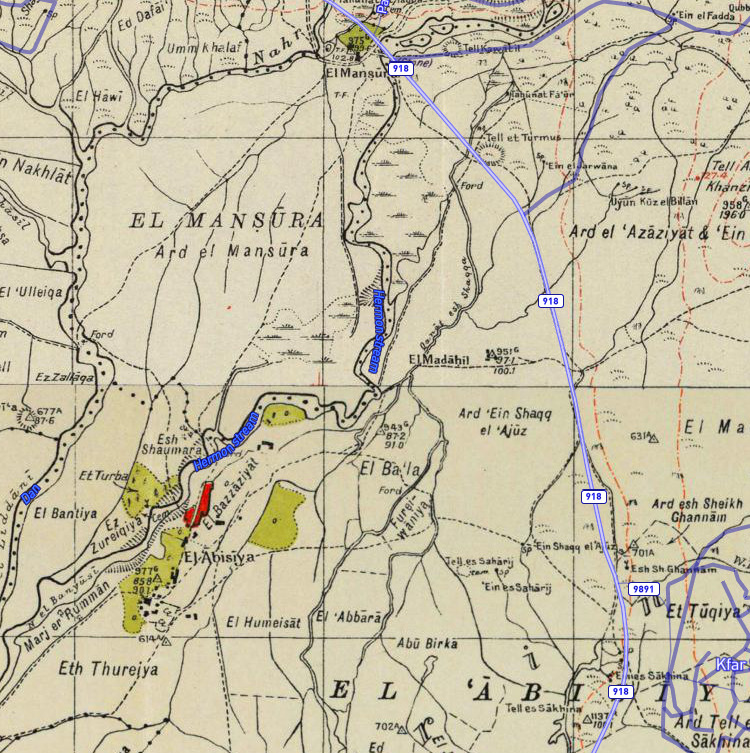
- 1870s map 1940s map modern map 1940s with modern overlay map A series of historical maps of the area around Madahil (click the buttons)

- Location within Mandatory Palestine
- Coordinates: 33°12′18″N 35°38′30″E
- Palestine grid: 210/290
- Geopolitical entity: Mandatory Palestine
- Subdistrict: Safad
- Date of depopulation: April 30, 1948
- Cause(s) of depopulation: Fear of being caught up in the fighting

Madahil (Arabic: مداحل) was a Palestinian Arab village in the Safad Subdistrict. It was depopulated during the 1947–1948 Civil War in Mandatory Palestine on April 30, 1948, by the Palmach's First Battalion of Operation Yiftach. It was located 30 km northeast of Safad in a flat area on the northeastern edge of the al-Hula Plain, about 1 km east of Wadi Banyas.

== History ==
Madahil was located just south of a small mound named Tall al-Turmus, which has provided evidence of a settlement dating to the fourth millennium B.C.

In the 1931 census of Palestine the population of Madahil was 100, all Muslims, in a total of 17 houses.

During the 1948 war, the evacuation occurred before the Zionist assault on Safad on 10 to 11 May. According to Morris, based on Haganah-sources, the villagers feared reprisals or feared being caught in a cross-fire after local Jewish communities had been attacked. Therefore, the villagers of Madahil (together with those of Khiyam al-Walid, Al-Hamra', Ghuraba, and (partially) Al-Muftakhira) fled. However the American historian Rosemarie Esber gives as depopulation cause "Attack or atrocity in neighboring village or community" and "Fear of impending attack, or fall of neighboring town or village." The Israeli settlement of Kefar Szold, founded in 1942, is located 1.5 km southeast of the village site, but not on village land.

The Palestinian historian Walid Khalidi described the village in 1992: "There are no traces of any village structures. The site is covered with grass, cane, and cactuses. The surrounding land is cultivated by the settlement of Kefar Szold."
