= Al-Khalasa =

al-Khalasa الخلصة al-Khalasah, al-Khalus, Elusa
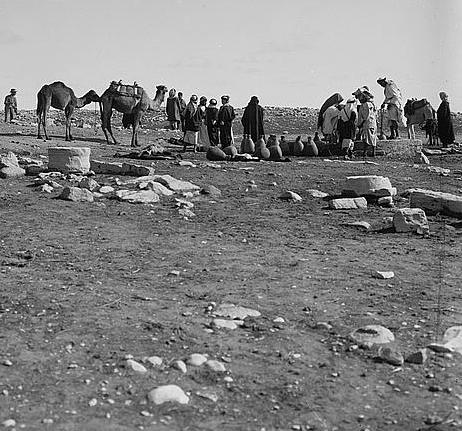
- The well at al-Khalasa

- Location within Mandatory Palestine
- Coordinates: 31°5′50″N 34°39′9″E
- Palestine grid: 116/056
- Geopolitical entity: Mandatory Palestine
- Subdistrict: Beersheba
- Date of depopulation: October 1948

Population (1945)
  - Total: Not known; populated by nomads
- Cause(s) of depopulation: Military assault by Yishuv forces

Al-Khalasa (Arabic: الخلصة, romanized: al-Khalasah; Hebrew: אל-ח'אלצה, al-Khalatsah), was a Palestinian village, located 23 kilometers southwest of the town of Beersheba. The village stood at the site of an ancient town from the Nabatean, Roman, Byzantine, and the beginning of the Early Muslim period. The ancient city, founded by the Nabateans, is known from Greek and Roman sources as "Halasa" or "Chellous", and later as "Elusa", one of the Byzantine administrative centers in the Negev Desert. Still important in the century of the Muslim conquest, it was deserted not long after. The site was repopulated by Bedouin in the early twentieth century, after western archaeologists took an interest in it. In October 1948, it was captured by Israel during the 1948 Arab-Israeli War. The population of al-Khalasa is unknown, but all of the inhabitants were Muslims, from the al-Azizma tribe.

== History ==
=== Nabataean, Roman, and Byzantine periods ===
The ancient site was founded by the Nabateans, probably in the late 4th or early 3rd century BCE. Roman historian Ptolemy identifies Elusa during the 2nd century CE as a town in Idumea west of the Jordan River. After the Roman annexation of Nabataea in 106, Elusa became the main city of the central Negev, the prominent 4th-century rhetorician Zenobius being born there.

Elusa, as of Palaestina Tertia, was among the first Negev towns with a large Christian population, which coexisted with pagans during the 4th and early 5th century.

=== Early Muslim period ===
The Nessana papyri (6th and 7th century) are attesting that after the Muslim conquest of Palestine, the city retained remained an administrative center during the beginning of the Early Muslim period at least until the late 7th century. The papyri are showing that after the Arab conquest, the city's name took the Arabic form of al-Khalus, which was closer to the original, pre-Hellenistic Semitic form. Eventually the city went into decline and was abandoned for centuries.

Thirteenth-century Syrian geographer Al-Dimashqi identifies it as one of the "Israelite" towns of the Negev Desert. Fourteenth century Egyptian geographer, al-Maqrizi said it was one of the larger "cities" in southern desert of Palestine. Khalidi describes how, as the Negev trade routes declined, al-Khalasa eventually diminished.

=== Western rediscovery, Bedouin resettlement ===
Edward Robinson visited the ruins in 1838 and, with the help of the preserved Arabic name, correctly identified the site as the long-lost Elusa. The constant interest of British, French and other Western archaeologists in the ancient site, encouraged al-Khalasa's resettlement by the al-Azizma Bedouin tribe of the Negev, who started building next to the wells and among the ancient ruins after the end of the First World War. They built the village with a triangular plan in between two wadis, with houses constructed of mud and stone. An elementary school was established in the village in 1941, and there were several shops. Most of the inhabitants earned their living through animal husbandry and commerce, and used a well for drinking water.

Excavations revealed traces of Late Ottoman infant jar-burials, commonly associated with nomads or itinerant workers of Egyptian origins.

=== 1948 war ===
During the 1948 Arab-Israeli War, the village was defended by the Egyptian Army and local militia volunteers. The Arab forces were defeated by Israel's Negev Brigade during Operation Yoav in the last days of October 1948.

== See also ==
- Depopulated Palestinian locations in Israel
- List of villages depopulated during the Arab-Israeli conflict

== Bibliography ==
- Khalidi, W. (1992). All That Remains: The Palestinian Villages Occupied and Depopulated by Israel in 1948. Washington D.C.: Institute for Palestine Studies. ISBN 0-88728-224-5.
- Le Strange, G. (1890). Palestine Under the Moslems: A Description of Syria and the Holy Land from A.D. 650 to 1500. Committee of the Palestine Exploration Fund.
- Robinson, E.; Smith, E. (1841). Biblical Researches in Palestine, Mount Sinai and Arabia Petraea: A Journal of Travels in the year 1838. Vol. 1. Boston: Crocker & Brewster.
