= Amir, Israel =

Kibbutz in northern Israel

Amir
- Kibbutz
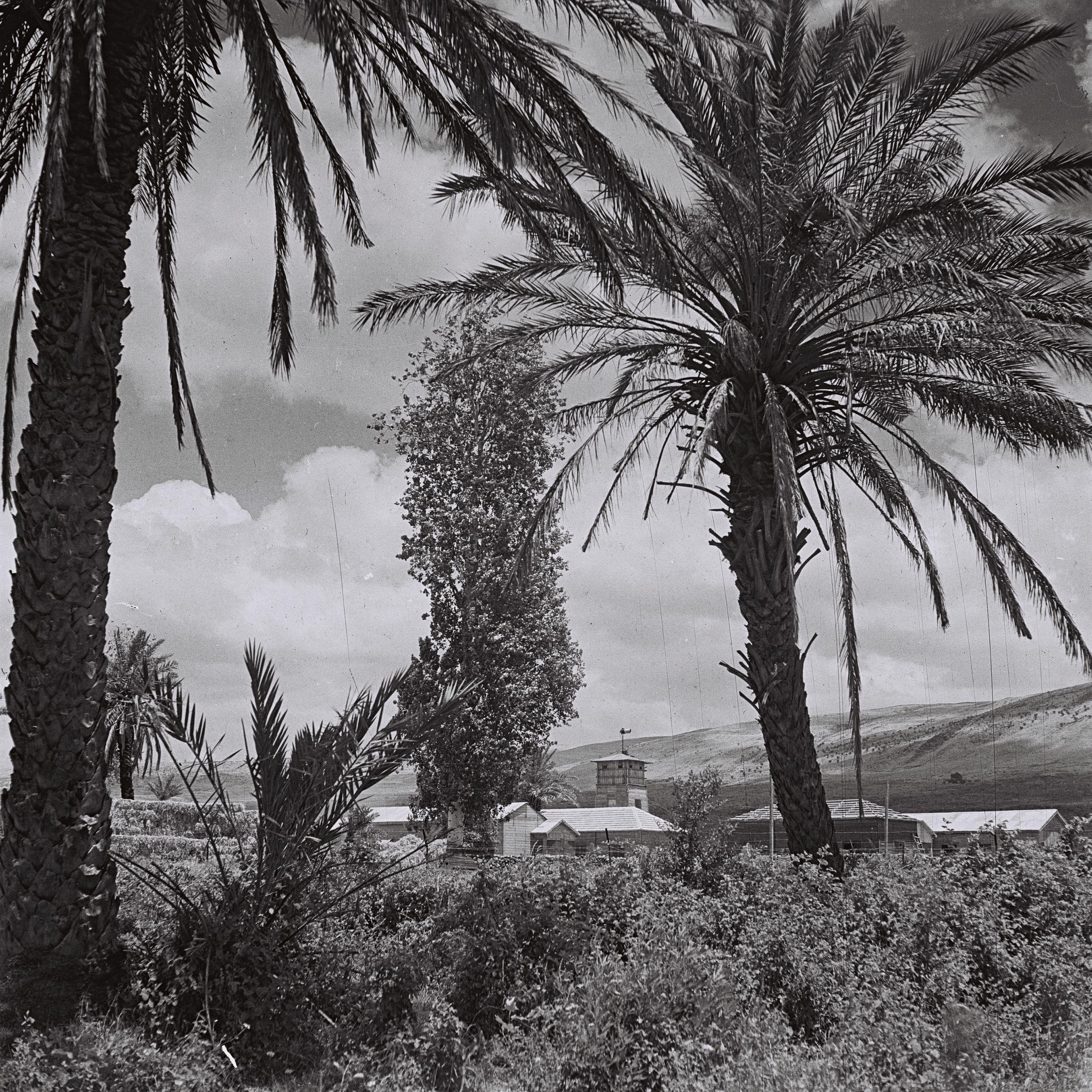

- Location within Northeast Israel Location within Israel
- Coordinates: 33°10′42″N 35°37′15″E
- Country: Israel
- District: Northern
- Subdistrict: Safed
- Council: Upper Galilee
- Affiliation: Kibbutz Movement
- Founded: 29 October 1939
- Founder: Lithuanian and Polish Jewish refugees
- Population (2024): 758

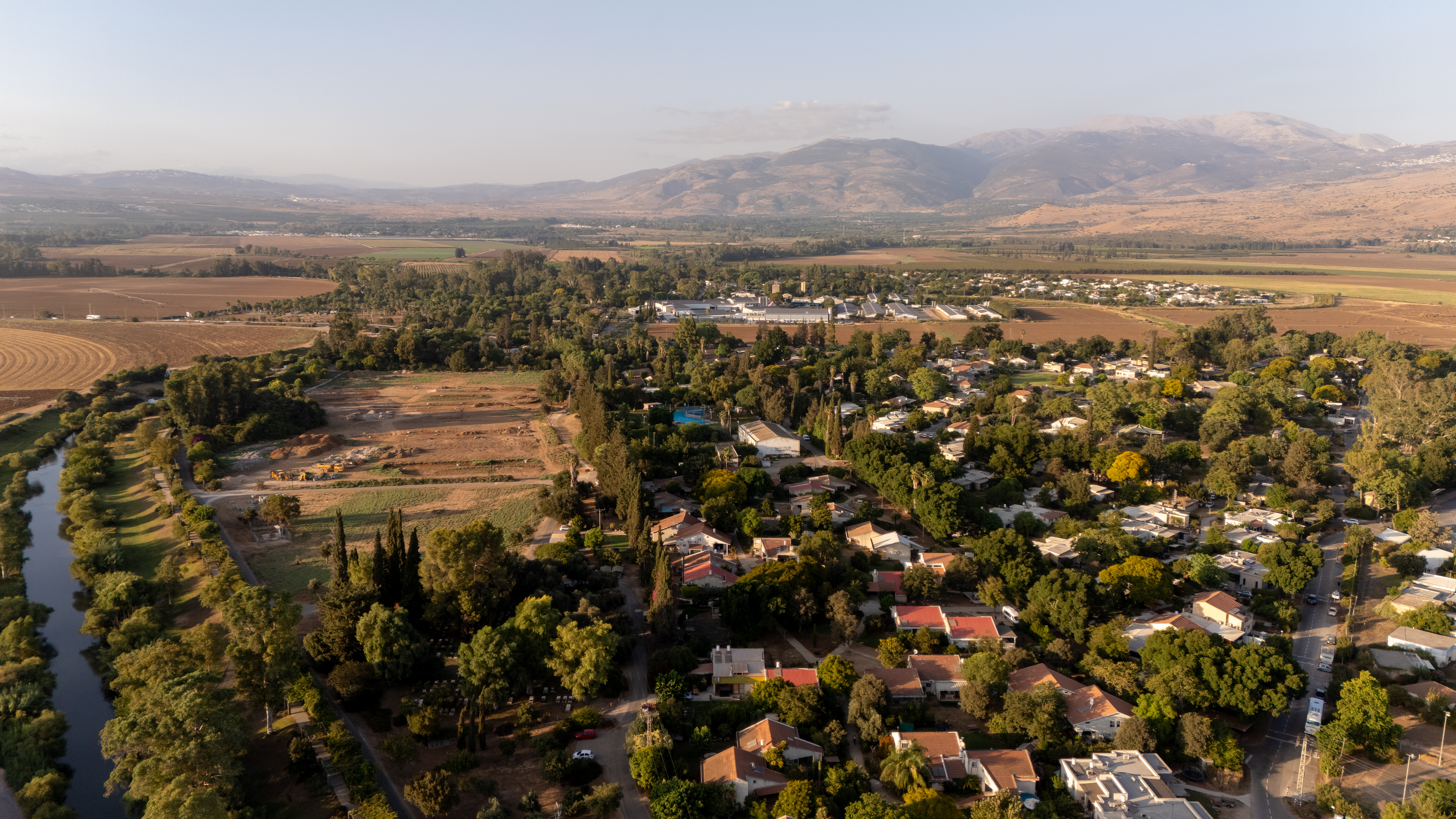
Kibbutz Amir

Amir (Hebrew: עָמִיר, lit. 'Sheaf') is a kibbutz in northern Israel. Located in the Galilee Panhandle near Kiryat Shmona, it falls under the jurisdiction of Upper Galilee Regional Council. In 2024 it had a population of 758. The kibbutz is on the eastern bank of the Jordan River in the Hula Valley, and has views of snow-topped Mount Hermon to the northeast, and the Ramat Naftali to the west. It was established in 1939 in the area today known as Lehavot HaBashan, and moved to its current location in 1942.

== History ==
Kibbutz Amir was established on 29 October 1939 on land purchased by the Jewish National Fund from the Arab village of Khiyam al-Walid. It was the last of the tower and stockade settlements, and the only one to be established during World War II. Its founders were Jewish immigrants and refugees from Lithuania and Poland, later joined by German and Yugoslav settlers. Initially they suffered from outbreaks of malaria, but managed to establish an intensively cultivated farm. According to a 1949 report from the Jewish National Fund, a clinic was opened at Amir for the treatment of malaria and eye diseases by a professor from Hebrew University. Until the beginning of the 1948 Arab-Israeli war treatment there for neighboring Arab villagers was free.

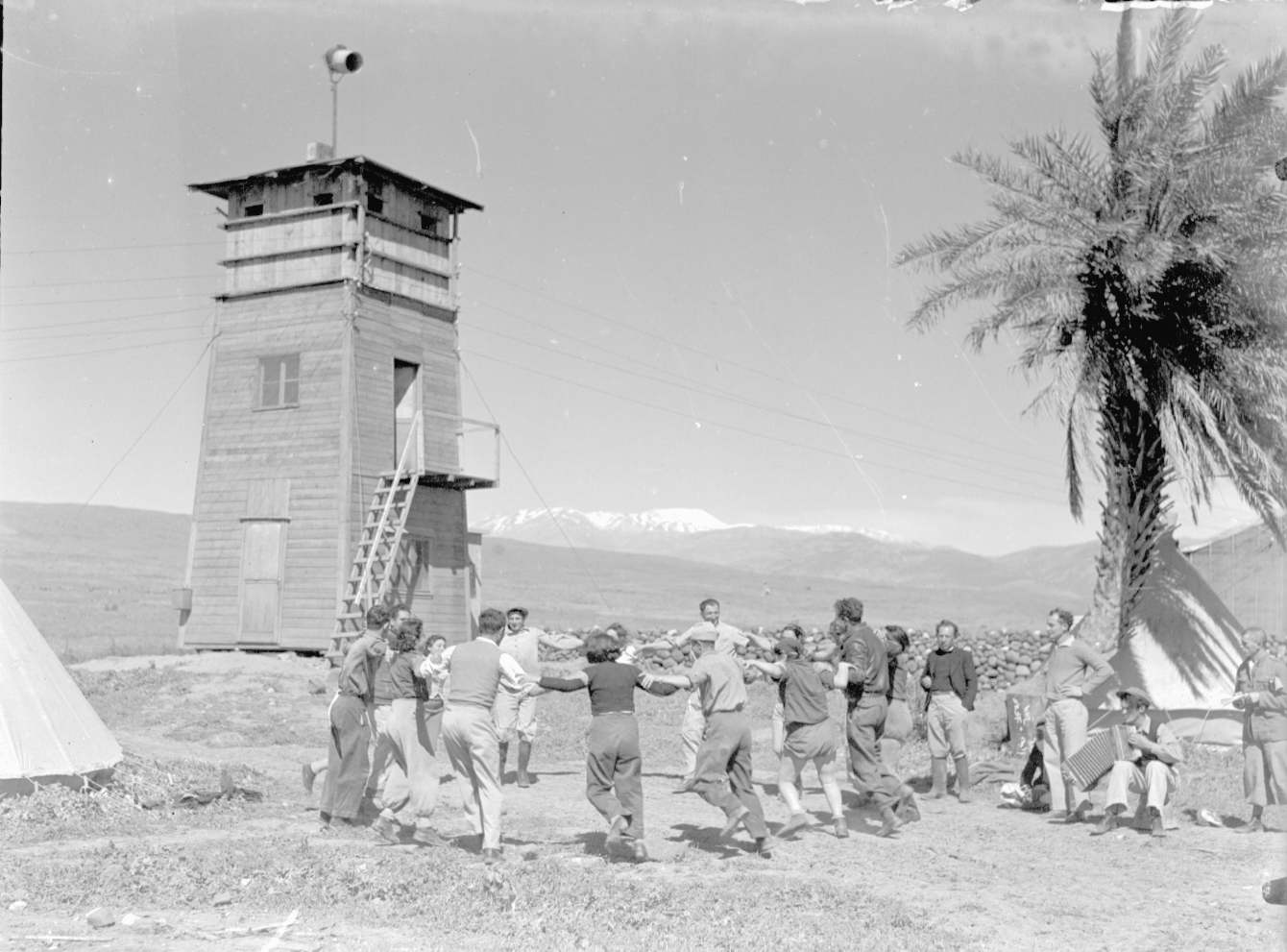
Kibbutz Amir 1940

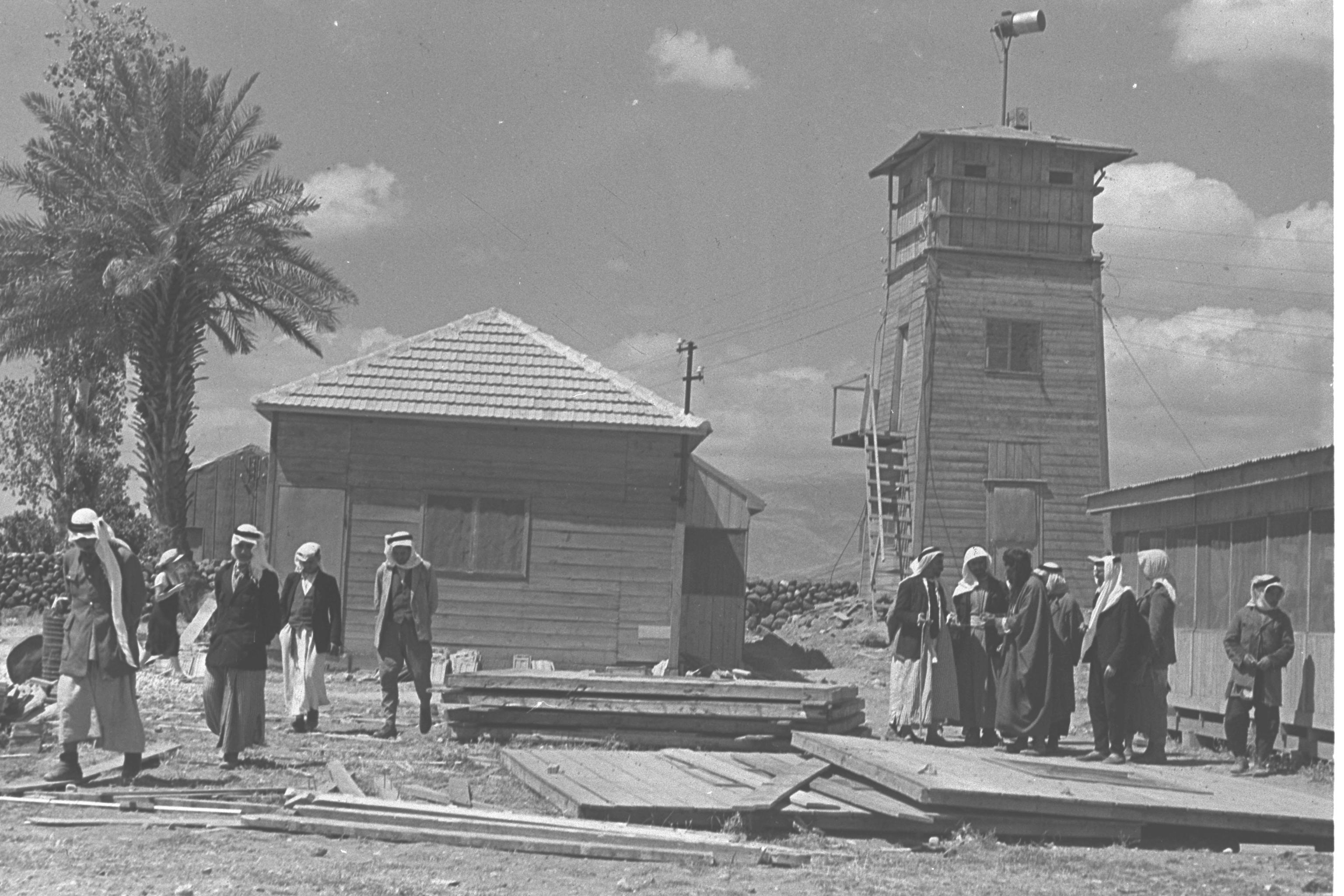
Kibbutz Amir 30 June 1940

A disposable diaper factory, Tafnukim, owned by the kibbutz was privatized in 2003. On July 15, 2006, a missile fired from Lebanon hit Kibbutz Amir, setting fire to the factory, which is located about 400 meters from the kibbutz residences. The attack was on Saturday when the factory was closed. Four days later, a missile hit a cow shed, killing two dozen dairy cows.

== Notable people ==
Several important female artists are associated with Kibbutz Amir. Israeli jewelry artist Deganit Stern Schocken was born at Kibbutz Amir in 1947; she now teaches and works in Hadera. American photographer Annie Leibovitz worked as a volunteer at Kibbutz Amir in 1969, and gelatin silver prints of her photos taken during her stay are now part of the collection of the Jewish Museum in New York.
