= Beersheba Subdistrict, Mandatory Palestine =

Administrative division of British Palestine (1920–1948)

Coordinates: 30°50′N 34°50′E

Beersheba Subdistrict قضاء بئر السبع נפת באר שבע
- Subdistrict of Mandatory Palestine
- 1920–1948
- Capital: Beersheba
- Area
  - 1945: 12,577 km^{2} (4,856 sq mi)
- Population
  - 1922: 75,254
  - 1931: 51,082
  - 1945: 90,507
- History
  - Established: 1920
  - Disestablished: 1948
Preceded by	Succeeded by
Mutasarrifate of Jerusalem	All-Palestine Government
- Today part of: Palestine

The Beersheba Subdistrict (Arabic: قضاء بئر السبع; Hebrew: נפת באר שבע) was one of the subdistricts of Mandatory Palestine. It was located in modern-day southern Palestine. The city of Beersheba was the capital. After the 1948 Arab–Israeli War, the subdistrict largely became the Beersheba Subdistrict of Israel.

The vast majority of the population, approximately 90%, consisted of nomadic Palestinian Bedouins.

== Towns and villages ==
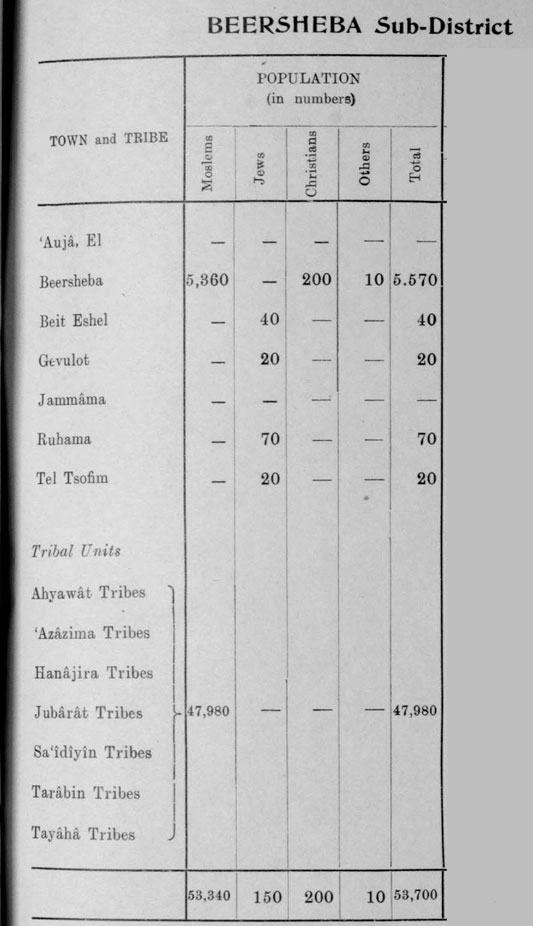
Official population statistics for the sub-district, from Village Statistics, 1945.

Beersheba Sub-District – Population by Town and Tribe
Town / Tribe	Muslims	Jews	Christians	Others	Total
‘Auja (El)					
Beersheba	5,360		200	10	5,570
Beit Eshel		40			40
Gevulot		20			20
Jammama					
Ruhama		70			70
Tel Tsofīm		20			20
Tribal Units					
Ahyawāt Tribes					
‘Azāzima Tribes					
Hanājira Tribes					
Jubārāt Tribes	47,980				47,980
Sa‘idiyin Tribes					
Tarābin Tribes					
Tayāha Tribes					
TOTAL	53,340	150	200	10	53,700

=== Depopulated towns and villages ===
(current localities in parentheses)

- Auja al-Hafir (Nessana)
- Beersheba
- al-Imara (Ofakim, Urim)
- al-Jammama (Ruhama)
- al-Khalasa
- Umm al-Rashrash (Eilat)
- Khirbat Futais (Al-Qadirat clan of Al-Tiyaha tribe) (Ofakim)
