= Britannia Park =

Forest in Israel

Coordinates: 31.70071°N 34.93172°E

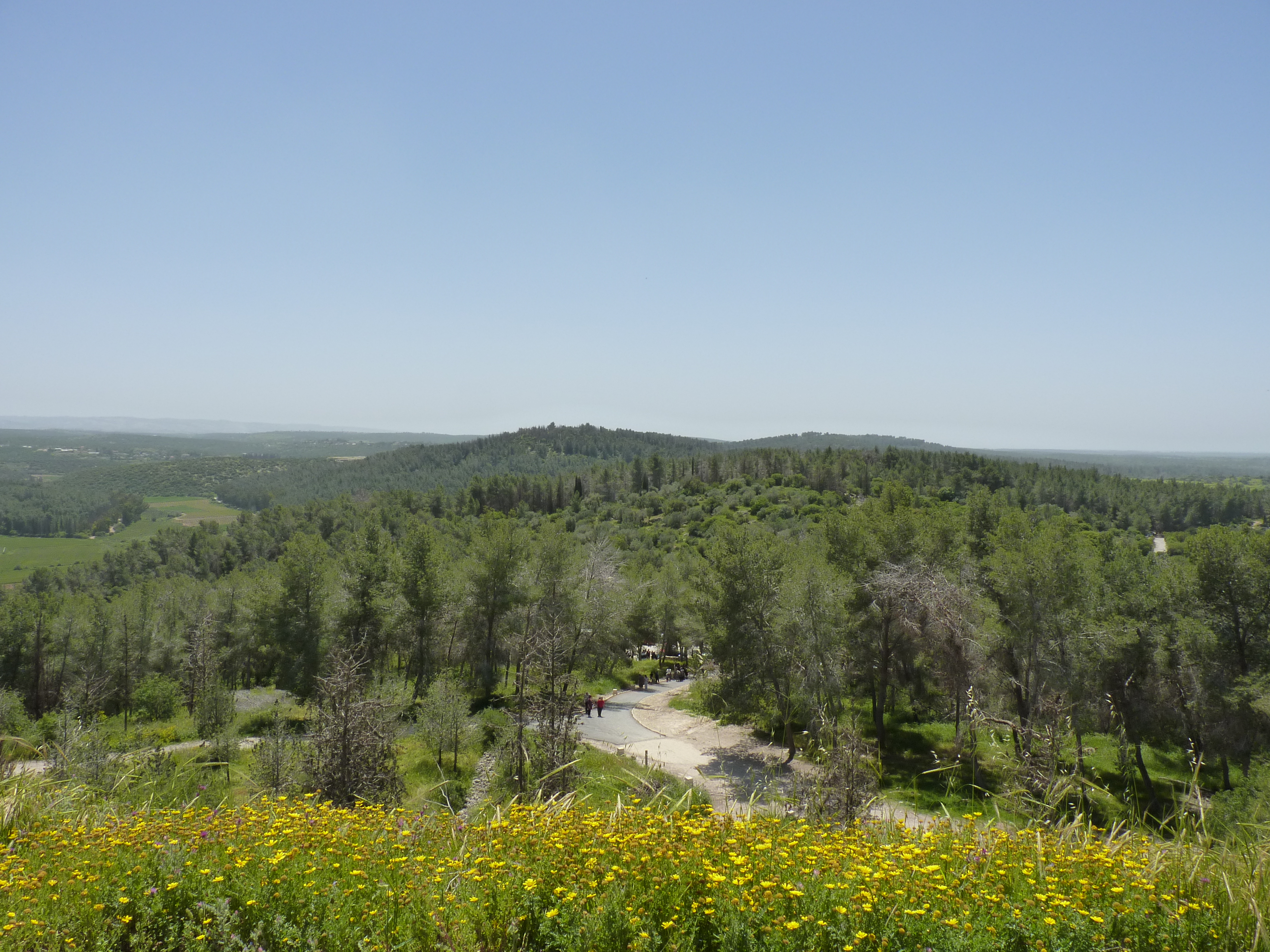
Britannia Park

Britannia Park (Hebrew: Park Britannia, פארק בריטניה) is a forest and recreation area in Israel, in the Judean lowland.

The forest was planted by the Jewish National Fund starting in the 1950s, and with the financial aid of British Jews, after whom the park was named. The area now covered by the park includes land associated with Palestinian villages depopulated during the 1947–1949 war.

== History ==
Britannia Park was created in the 1950s as part of large-scale afforestation projects carried out by the Jewish National Fund (KKL-JNF) with financial support from British Jewish donors; the park was named in recognition of that support.

The area now covered by the park includes lands associated with several Palestinian villages that were depopulated during the 1947–1949 war; scholarly sources and village histories record that nearby localities such as Dayr al-Dubban and Dayr Abu Salama were depopulated in 1948.

Some historians and commentators have documented how, in the decades following 1948, parts of the depopulated village lands were incorporated into state land and planted with forests and picnic sites by the JNF; the planting of forests and creation of recreation areas on former village sites has been the subject of critical attention by heritage groups and scholars.

Advocacy and heritage organizations such as Zochrot and Stop the JNF argue that planting and development have obscured or covered the remains of former villages and call for recognition of the pre-1948 Palestinian presence on the land; these perspectives are reflected in publications and tours documenting the former village sites.

== Geography and Ecology ==
Britannia Park covers an area of approximately 40,000 dunams (around 10,000 acres) within the Judean Lowlands (Shephelah). The park functions as a vital ecological corridor, creating a contiguous expanse of land that connects various plant and animal habitats, allowing wildlife and seeds to migrate between different regions. The topography consists of rolling hills composed of soft chalk rock, with an average annual precipitation of roughly 490 mm. A 15-kilometer scenic driving route suitable for private vehicles traverses the park from its northern gate near Moshav Zekharia down to Tel Goded.

== Flora and Fauna ==
The park contains extensive areas of well-preserved natural Mediterranean vegetation alongside planted forests and historical agricultural terraces.

- Flora: The lower western sections of the park feature open woodlands dominated by large carob trees, mastic (Pistacia lentiscus), and buckthorn (Rhamnus palaestinus). The slopes around Ramat Avishur support a denser woodland of Israeli common oak (Quercus calliprinos), Terebinth (Pistacia palaestina), broad-leaved phillyrea, and Greek strawberry trees. Scattered agricultural terraces within the park preserve older orchards of almond, fig, olive, and pomegranate trees, alongside prickly-pear cacti. Afforestation projects by the JNF in the 1950s and 1960s introduced conifers—primarily Jerusalem pine—and eucalyptus groves to the area.
- Fauna: The varied habitats of the park support large mammals such as mountain gazelles, caracals, and jackals, as well as smaller mammals like porcupines and rabbits. The avian population includes nesting short-toed snake eagles, barn owls, kestrels, crested larks, and bee-eaters, which burrow into the chalk cliffs.

== Archaeology and Landmarks ==
The area encompassed by Britannia Park is rich in archaeological remains dating from antiquity, when local populations relied on cisterns and wells hewn into the local chalk. Key landmarks include:

- Tel Azeka: An ancient biblical city that commanded the route from the coastal plain to the Judean hills. It overlooks the Elah Valley, the traditional site of the battle between David and Goliath. The hill contains an underground network of hideout caves and tunnels believed to date back to the Bar Kokhba revolt.
- Mitzpe Masua (Masua Lookout): A central observation point featuring a JNF fire-monitoring tower that offers panoramic views of the Coastal Plain and the Judean Hills.
- Tel Goded and Luzit Caves: Archaeological sites featuring ancient ruins, water cisterns, and complex chalk burial and bell caves.
- Hurvat Shikalon: A hilltop site containing the remains of ancient wine presses, olive presses, and cisterns.

== Tourism and Infrastructure ==
Britannia Park is a major center for outdoor recreation in central Israel, equipped with hiking trails, scenic lookouts, and cycling tracks. The park is accessible via several main entrances along Route 383, Route 38, and Route 353. Major developed recreation areas include the Srigim Recreation Area and the Mitzpe Masua Recreation Area, the latter of which provides public amenities such as drinking water and restrooms.

== See also ==
- List of forests in Israel
- Hiking in Israel
