= Al-Zahiriyya al-Tahta =

Al-Zahiriyya al-Tahta الظاهرية التحته Dhahiriya Tahta Edh Dhaheriyeh et Tahta
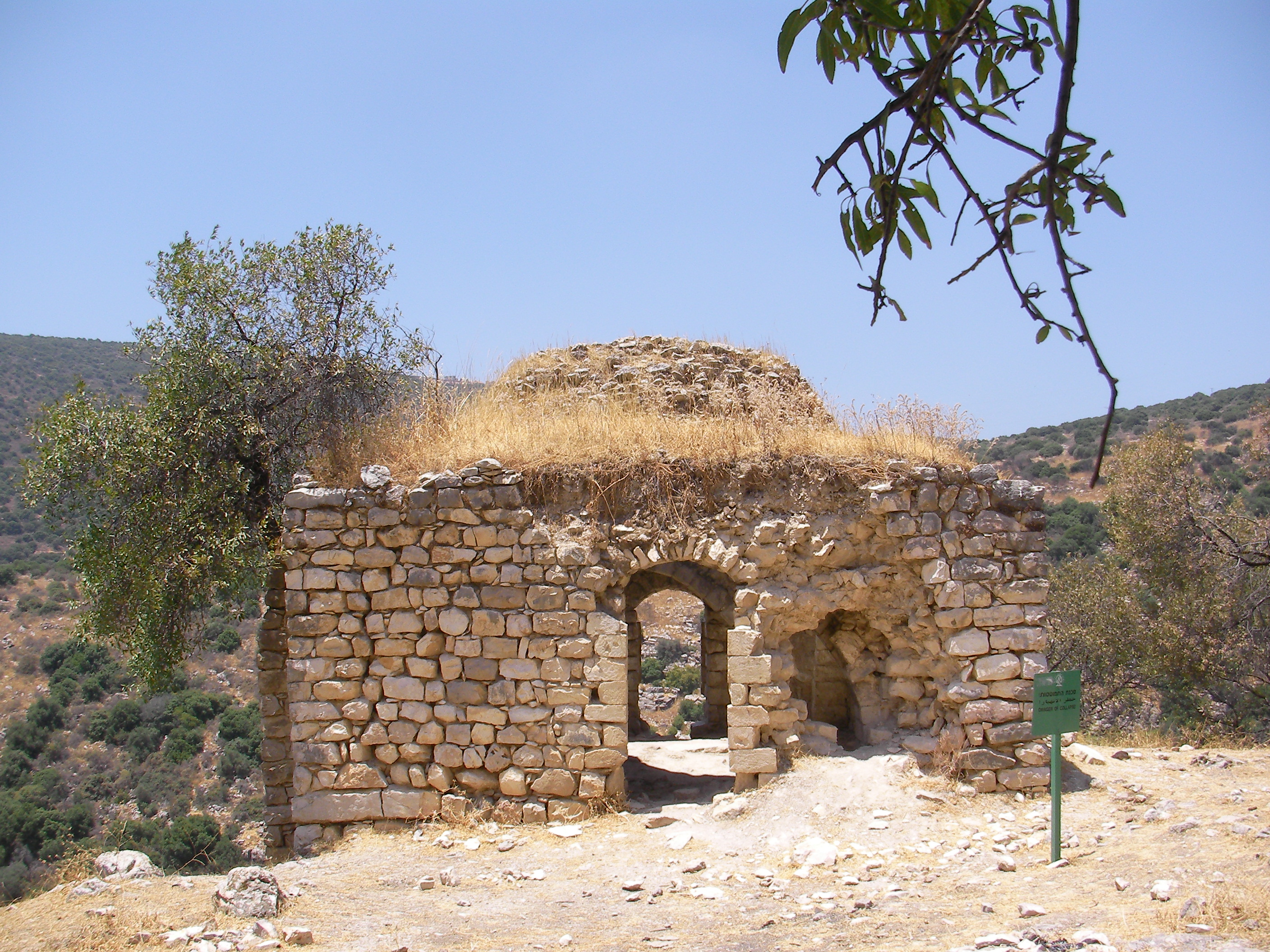
- Maqam for Sheikh el-Kuweiyis ("the pretty sheikh") in 2010, located south-southwest of the village site

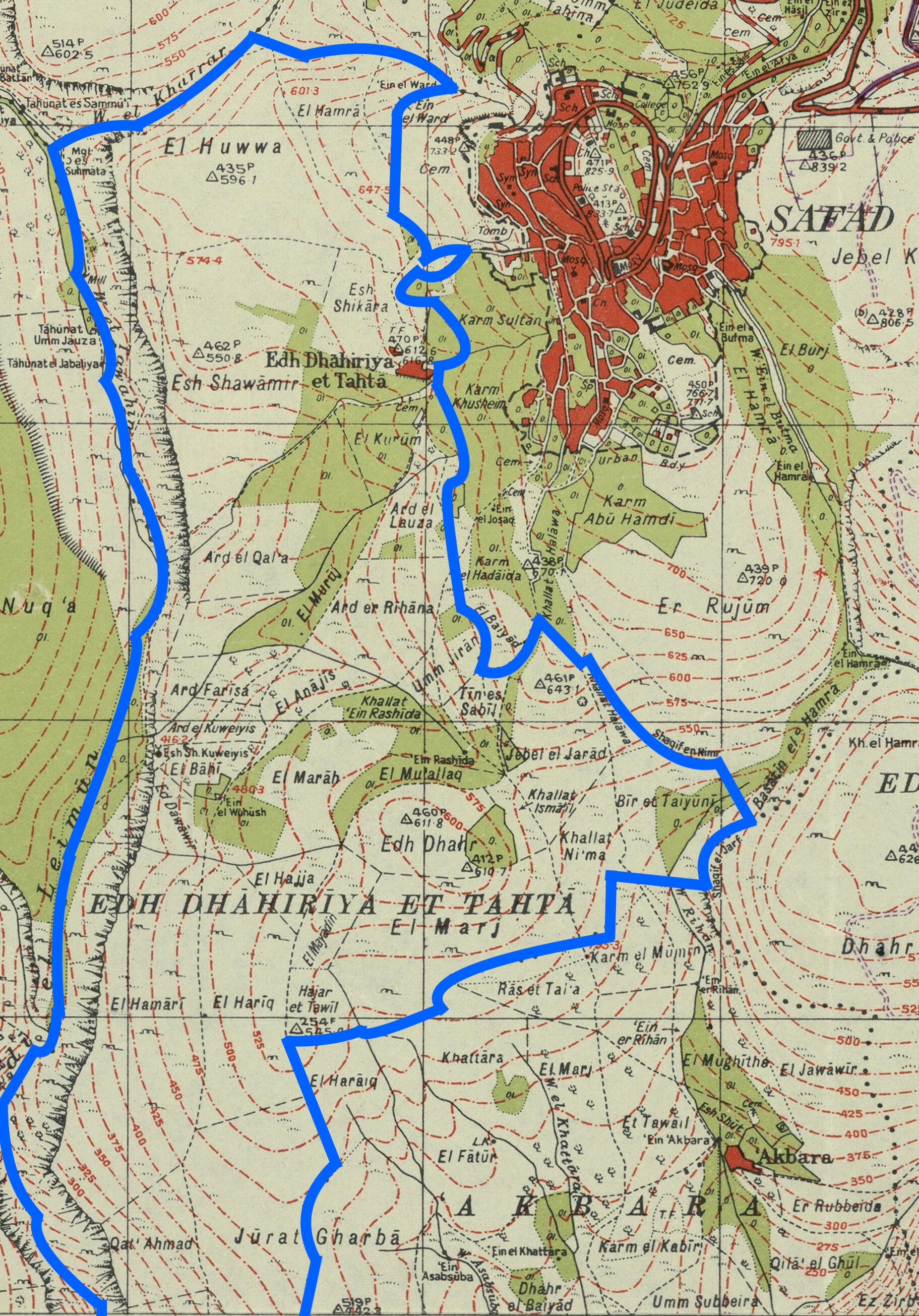
- The village boundary of Al-Zahiriyya al-Tahta on the 1942 Survey of Palestine map; click image to view full map. The village maqam is shown as "Esh Sh. Kuweiyis", southwest of the built up area of Edh Dhahiriya et Tatha but within the village land borders.

- Location within Mandatory Palestine
- Coordinates: 32°57′47″N 35°29′12″E
- Palestine grid: 195/263
- Geopolitical entity: Mandatory Palestine
- Subdistrict: Safad
- Depopulation: 10 May 1948

Area
  - Total: 6,773 dunams (6.773 km^{2}; 2.615 sq mi)

Population (1945)
  - Total: 350
- Cause(s) of depopulation: Influence of nearby town's fall
- Current Localities: Safad

Al-Zahiriyya al-Tahta (Arabic: الظاهرية التحته, romanized: al-Ẓāhiriyya al-Ṭaḥṭā) was a Palestinian Arab village in the Safad Subdistrict. The village was on a descent at the southwestern part of Safad, a town 1 kilometer (0.62 mi) east of the village. Possibly named after the Mamluk sultan al-Zahir Baybars (r. 1260–1277), the village was incorporated into the Safad Sanjak of the Ottoman Empire in 1517, and its entirely Muslim population paid fixed taxes, as well as taxes on winter pastures, an olive oil or grape syrup press and beehives during the 16th century. By the late 19th century, the population grew to 335 inhabitants, all Muslims. The population remained about the same in the last years of British Mandatory rule. The village lands spanned 6,773 dunums, nearly half of which were used to grow grains, the residents living on 28 dunums. Al-Zahiriyya al-Tahta was depopulated during the 1948 Palestine War when its inhabitants fled shortly after the capture of Safed by Jewish paramilitary forces.

== Name ==
According to Edward Henry Palmer the name Edh Dhaheriyeh et Tahta means "The lower village on the ridge", while according to Walid Khalidi, the name Zahiriyya might be a tribute to the Mamluk Sultan al-Zahir Baybars.

== History ==
=== Ottoman era ===
Incorporated into the Ottoman Empire in 1517 with the rest of Palestine; in the 1596 tax registers al-Zahiriyya al-Tahta belonged to the nahiya (subdistrict) of Jira in the Safad Sanjak. It had an all Muslim population, consisting of 56 households; an estimated population of 308. The villagers paid most of its taxes as a fixed sum of 6,000 akçe. In addition they paid taxes on goats and beehives, winter pastures, occasional revenues, and a press for olive oil or grape syrup; a total 6,336 akçe. Part of the revenues went to a waqf (religious endowment).

The village appeared under the name of Elzalarieh on the map that Pierre Jacotin compiled during Napoleon's invasion of 1799, while in 1838 it was noted as a village in the Safad district. In 1881 the PEF's Survey of Western Palestine described al-Zahiriyya al-Tahta: "This village is built of good stone materials, at the foot of a hill, with olives and arable land around. It is inhabited by about 100 Moslems, and has two good springs close to the village." A population list from about 1887 referred to the village as Kiryet ed Daheriyeh, and counted 335 Muslim inhabitants.

=== British Mandate era ===
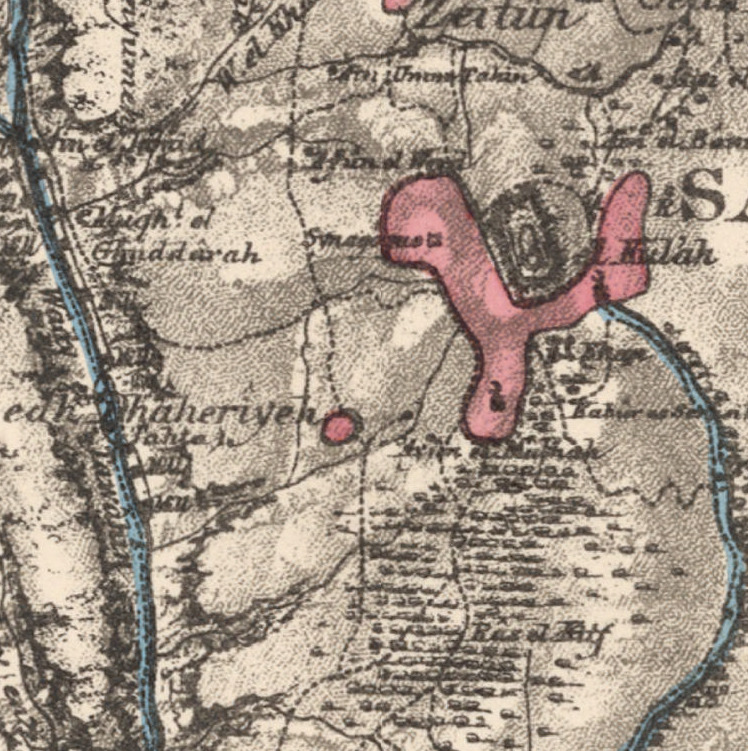
1870s map
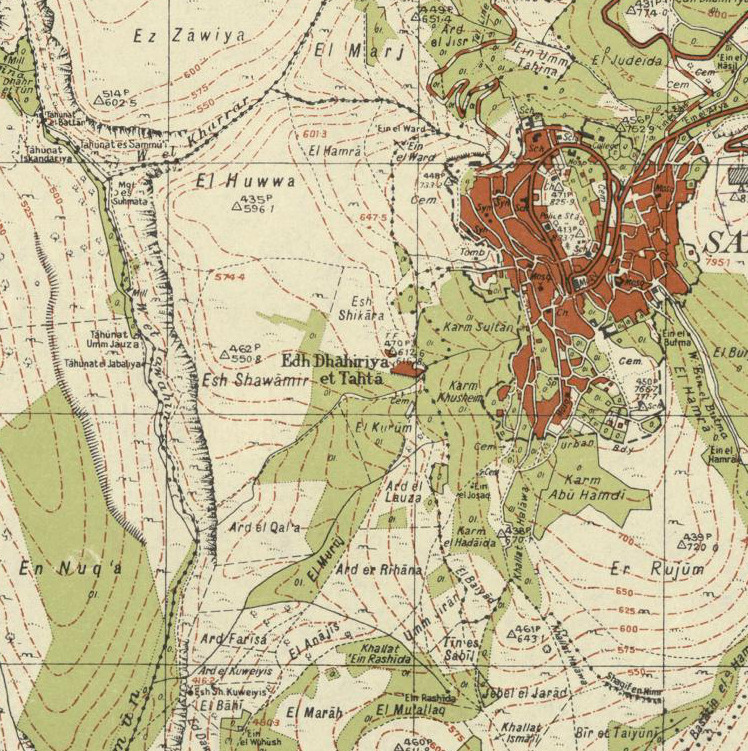
1940s map
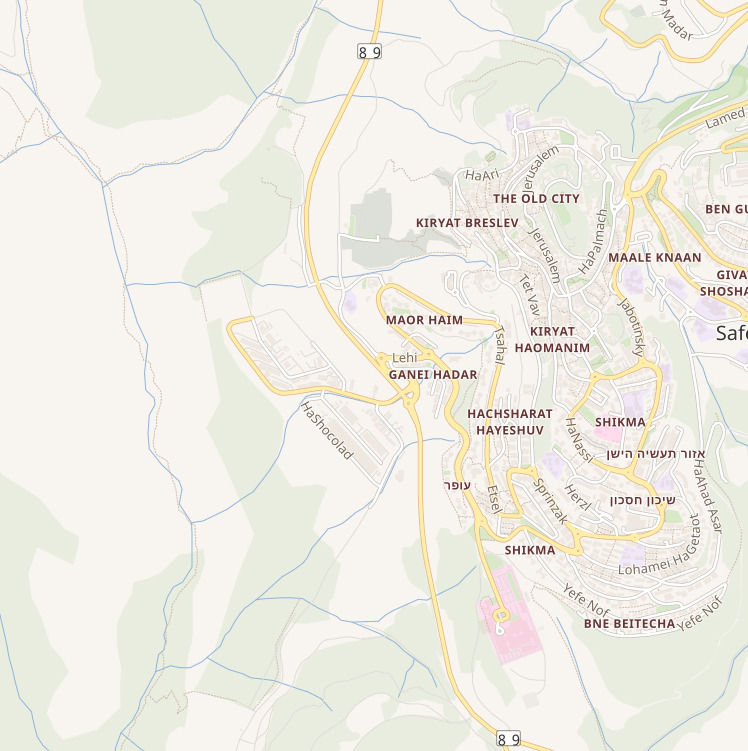
modern map
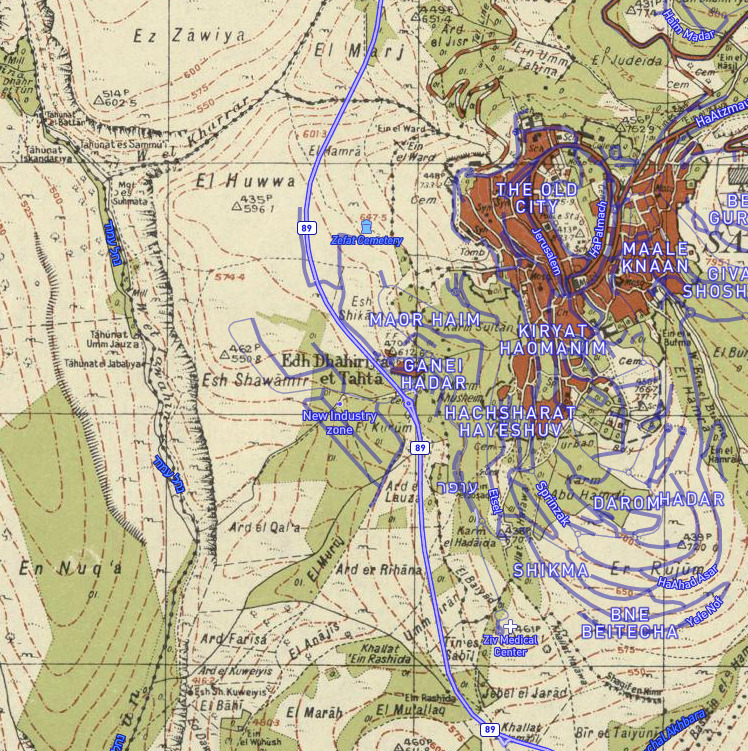
1940s with modern overlay map
A series of historical maps of the area around Al-Zahiriyya al-Tahta (click the buttons)

In the 1922 census of Palestine conducted by the British Mandate authorities, al-Zahiriyya al-Tahta had a population of 212 Muslims, increasing slightly in the 1931 census to 256 Muslims, in a total of 53 houses. In the 1945 statistics, al-Zahiriyya al-Tahta had a population of 350, all Muslims, and a land area of 6,773 dunams. Of this, 810 dunams were plantations and irrigable land, 3,042 were used for grain, while 28 dunams were classified as built-up, or urban area. The children in the village went to school in Safad.

=== 1948 war and aftermath ===
The inhabitants of al-Zahiriyya al-Tahta fled the village in the aftermath of Safed's capture by the Jewish paramilitary forces of the Palmach and the Haganah and the subsequent exodus of Safed's Arab population in early May 1948, during the 1947–1948 civil war in Mandatory Palestine.

In 1992 the village site was described: "The entire topography of the place has been altered, as Safad's expansion has taken over the site. A street that is part of the urban neighborhood crosses the site and leads to a recently-built cluster of houses. However, the stone debris from demolished houses can be identified, along with iron supports that protrude from the ruined cement walls. The cemetery is visible, though dilapidated. An olive grove and almond trees grow on the edge of the site."

In 2003 a memorial book about the village was published in Jordan.

== Bibliography ==
- Al-Waridat, Anwar (2003). Al-Zahiriyya [al-Dhahiriyya] goshen bint Filastin [Al-Zahiriyya, daughter of Palestine]. Jordan: Al-Zarqa'. "n.p."
- Barron, J.B., ed. (1923). Palestine: Report and General Abstracts of the Census of 1922. Government of Palestine.
- Conder, C.R.; Kitchener, H.H. (1881). The Survey of Western Palestine: Memoirs of the Topography, Orography, Hydrography, and Archaeology. Vol. 1. London: Committee of the Palestine Exploration Fund.
- Davis, Rochelle (2011). Palestinian Village Histories: Geographies of the Displaced. Stanford: Stanford University Press. ISBN 978-0-8047-7313-3.
- Department of Statistics (1945). Village Statistics, April, 1945. Government of Palestine.
- Esber, R.M. (2008). Under the Cover of War, The Zionist Expulsions of the Palestinians. Arabicus Books & Media. ISBN 978-0981513171. (pp. 327, 391)
- Grootkerk, Salomon E. (2000). Ancient sites in Galilee: a toponymic gazetteer (Illustrated ed.). BRILL. ISBN 978-90-04-11535-4.
- Hadawi, S. (1970). Village Statistics of 1945: A Classification of Land and Area ownership in Palestine. Palestine Liberation Organization Research Center. Archived from the original on 2018-12-08.
- Hütteroth, W.-D.; Abdulfattah, K. (1977). Historical Geography of Palestine, Transjordan and Southern Syria in the Late 16th Century. Erlanger Geographische Arbeiten, Sonderband 5. Erlangen, Germany: Vorstand der Fränkischen Geographischen Gesellschaft. ISBN 3-920405-41-2.
- Karmon, Y. (1960). "An Analysis of Jacotin's Map of Palestine" (PDF). Israel Exploration Journal. 10 (3, 4): 155–173, 244–253. Archived from the original (PDF) on 2017-12-01.
- Khalidi, W. (1992). All That Remains: The Palestinian Villages Occupied and Depopulated by Israel in 1948. Washington D.C.: Institute for Palestine Studies. ISBN 0-88728-224-5.
- Mills, E., ed. (1932). Census of Palestine 1931. Population of Villages, Towns and Administrative Areas. Jerusalem: Government of Palestine.
- Morris, B. (2004). The Birth of the Palestinian Refugee Problem Revisited. Cambridge University Press. ISBN 978-0-521-00967-6. (p.591)
- Palmer, E.H. (1881). The Survey of Western Palestine: Arabic and English Name Lists Collected During the Survey by Lieutenants Conder and Kitchener, R. E. Transliterated and Explained by E.H. Palmer. Committee of the Palestine Exploration Fund.
- al-Qawuqji, Fauzi (1972). "Memoirs of al-Qawuqji, Fauzi". Journal of Palestine Studies. Archived from the original on 2011-09-28.
  - "Memoirs, 1948, Part I" in 1, no. 4 (Sum. 72): 27-58
  - "Memoirs, 1948, Part II" in 2, no. 1 (Aut. 72): 3-33.
- Rhode, H. (1979). Administration and Population of the Sancak of Safed in the Sixteenth Century (PhD). Columbia University. Archived from the original on 2020-03-01.
- Robinson, E.; Smith, E. (1841). Biblical Researches in Palestine, Mount Sinai and Arabia Petraea: A Journal of Travels in the year 1838. Vol. 3. Boston: Crocker & Brewster.
- Schumacher, G. (1888). "Population list of the Liwa of Akka". Quarterly Statement - Palestine Exploration Fund. 20: 169–191.
