= Khiyam al-Walid =

Khiyam al-Walid خيام الوليد
- Village
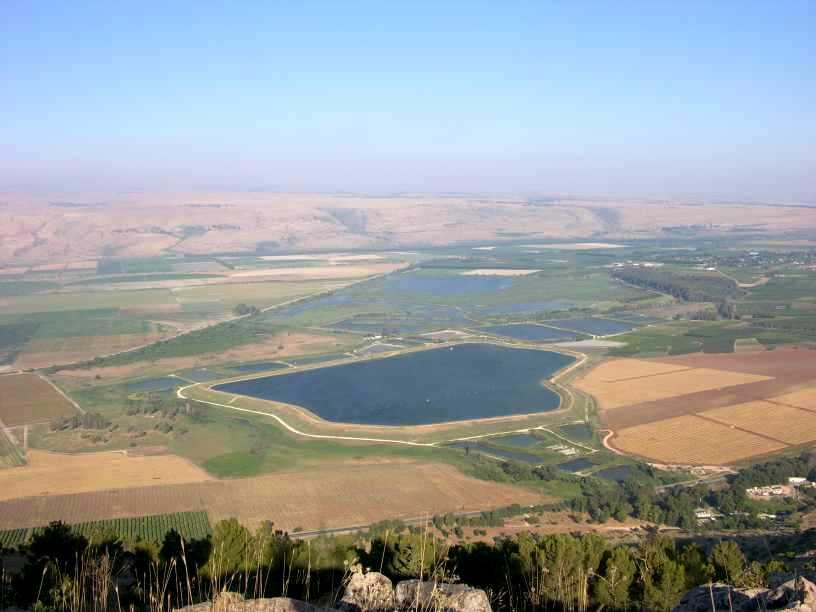
- Khiyam al-Walid was located on the eastern edge of the Hula Valley
- Etymology: "the tents of al-Walid"
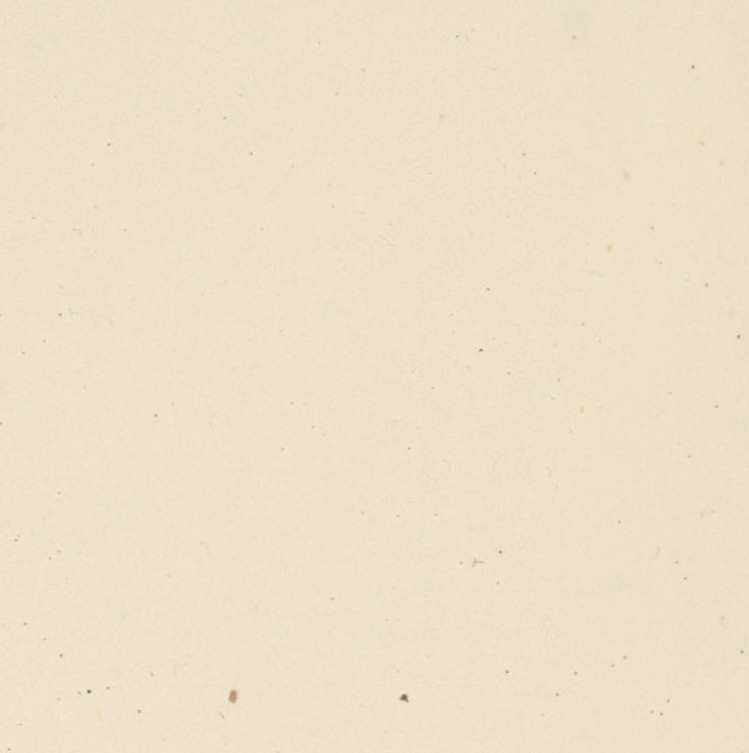
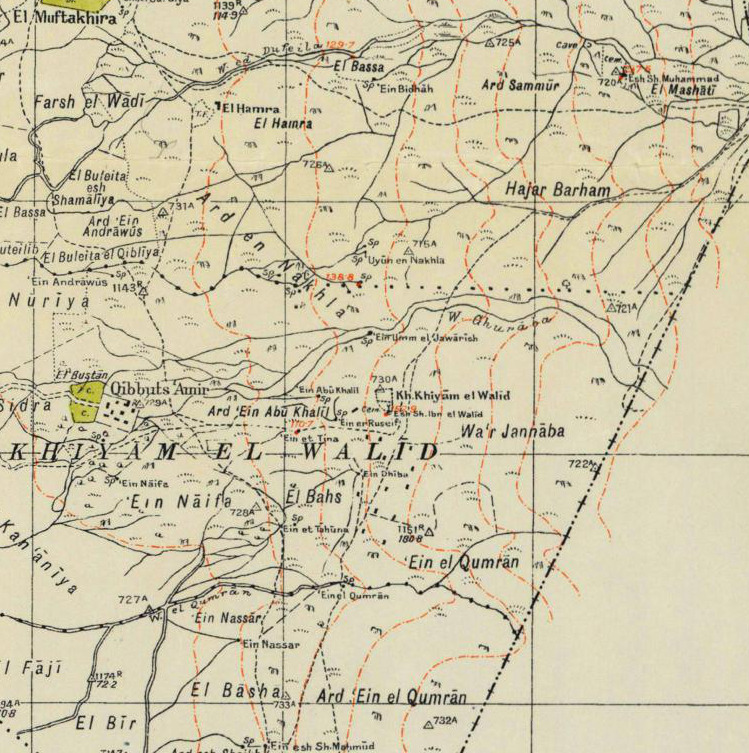
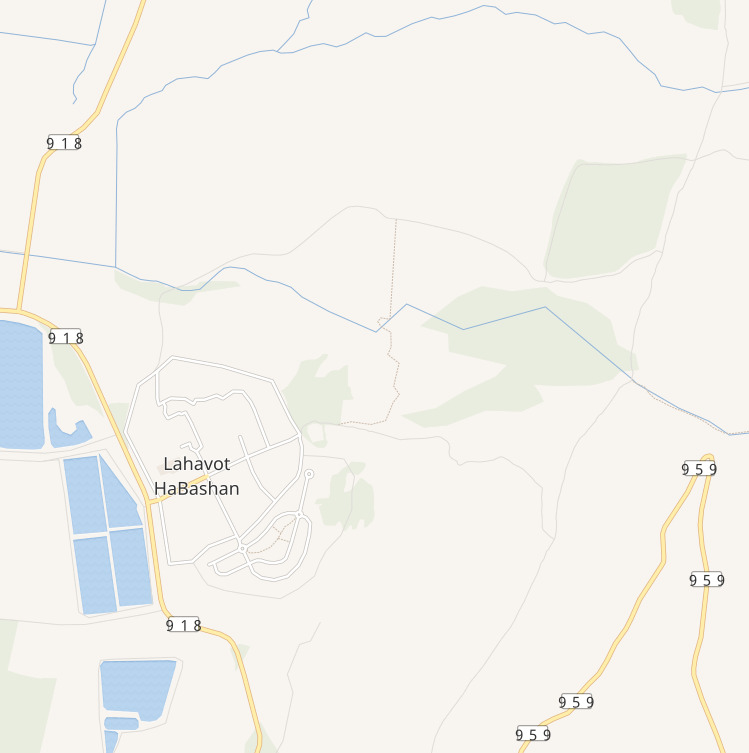
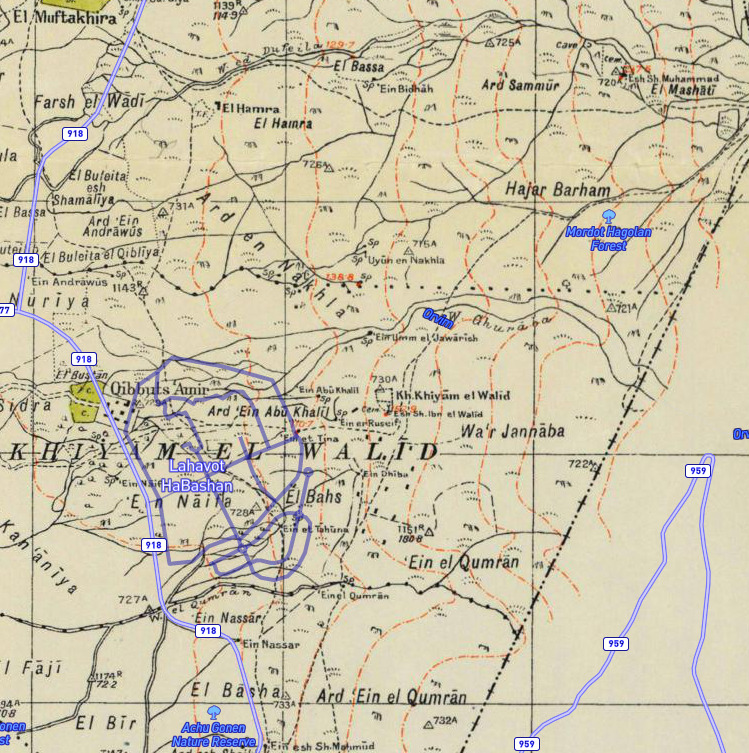
- 1870s map 1940s map modern map 1940s with modern overlay map A series of historical maps of the area around Khiyam al-Walid (click the buttons)

- Location within Mandatory Palestine
- Coordinates: 33°08′39″N 35°39′14″E
- Palestine grid: 211/282
- Geopolitical entity: Mandatory Palestine
- Subdistrict: Safad
- Date of depopulation: May 1, 1948

Area
  - Total: 4,215 dunams (4.215 km^{2}; 1.627 sq mi)

Population (1945)
  - Total: 280
- Cause(s) of depopulation: Fear of being caught up in the fighting
- Current Localities: Lehavot HaBashan

Khiyam al-Walid (Arabic: خيام الوليد) was a Palestinian Arab village in the Safad Subdistrict located 25.5 kilometers (15.8 mi) northeast of Safad along the Syrian border. It was on situated on a hill 150 meters (490 ft) above sea level on the eastern edge of the Hula Valley. In 1945, there were 280 predominantly Muslim inhabitants. It was depopulated during the 1948 Palestine War.

== History ==
The name of the village in Arabic is translated as "the tents of al-Walid", which may refer to the Arab Muslim commander Khalid ibn al-Walid (d. 642). According to local tradition, a shrine and the tomb of the sage Shaykh ibn al-Walid was located in the village mosque.

=== British Mandate era ===
In the 1931 census of Palestine the population of Khiyam al-Walid was 181, all Muslims, in a total of 42 houses.

Khiyam al Walid was classified as a hamlet by the Palestine Index Gazetteer. During the British Mandate period, many of the houses were situated along the road to the nearby village of az-Zawiya. There was a good water source to the east, and the village consequently expanded in that direction. In a 1945 survey, the village was made up of a total 4,215 dunams. Despite its entire population being Arab, 92% of its land was Jewish-owned.

Types of land use in dunams in the village in the 1945 statistics:

Land Usage	Arab	Jewish
Irrigated and plantation	153	2,599
Cereal	0	502
Cultivable	153	3,101
Urban		
Non-cultivable	8	800

The land ownership of the village before occupation in dunams:

Owner	Dunams
Arab	161
Jewish	3,901
Public	153
Total	4,215

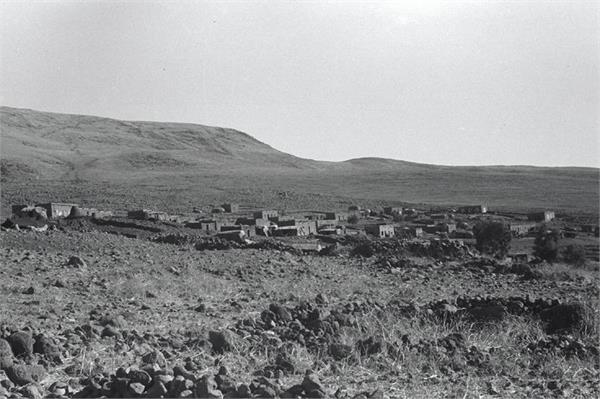
Khiyam al-Walid 1945

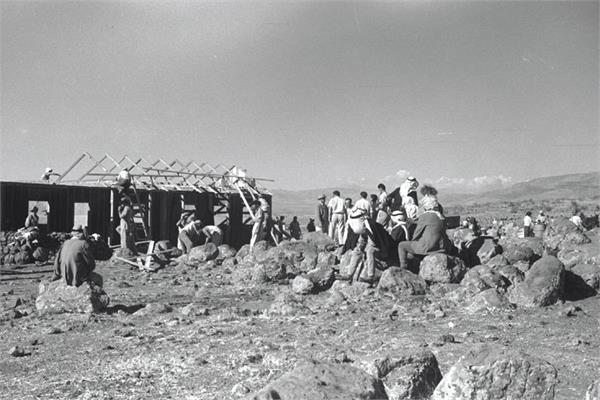
Lehavot HaBashan under construction on Khiyam al-Walid land 1945

=== 1948, aftermath ===
According to an Israeli military report in June 1948, the residents fled on May 1 in anticipation of an attack by Israeli forces. It was occupied by the end of may in Operation Yiftach.

Palestinian historian Walid Khalidi wrote of the remains of the village in 1992, saying "The site is deserted and overgrown with grass and thorns. There are a few carob trees, piles of stones, and crumbled terraces."

== Bibliography ==
- Department of Statistics (1945). Village Statistics, April, 1945. Government of Palestine.
- Hadawi, S. (1970). Village Statistics of 1945: A Classification of Land and Area ownership in Palestine. Palestine Liberation Organization Research Center. Archived from the original on 2018-12-08.
- Khalidi, W. (1992). All That Remains:The Palestinian Villages Occupied and Depopulated by Israel in 1948. Washington D.C.: Institute for Palestine Studies. ISBN 0-88728-224-5.
- Mills, E., ed. (1932). Census of Palestine 1931. Population of Villages, Towns and Administrative Areas. Jerusalem: Government of Palestine.
- Morris, B. (2004). The Birth of the Palestinian Refugee Problem Revisited. Cambridge University Press. ISBN 978-0-521-00967-6.
