= Al-Wayziyya =

Al-Wayziyya الويزية Weiziya
- Village
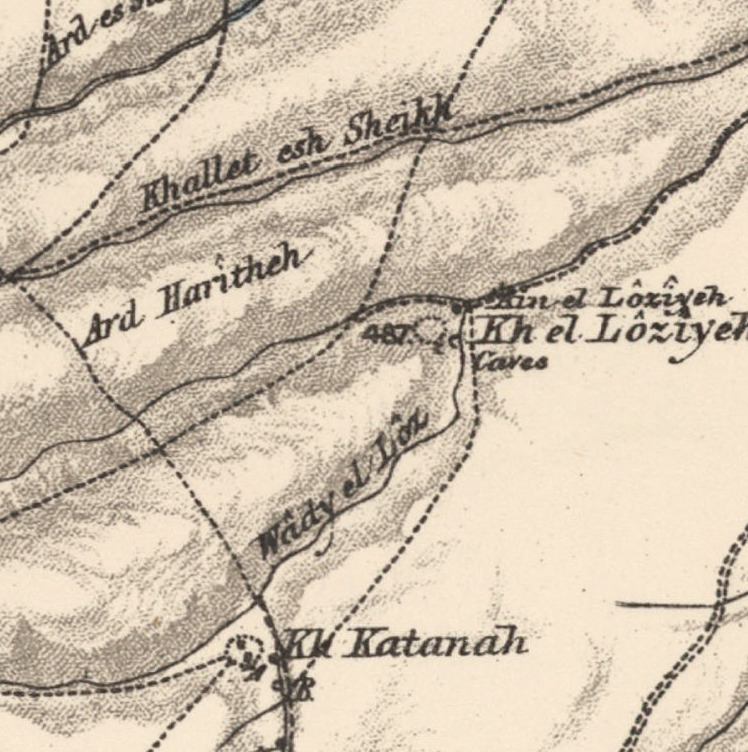
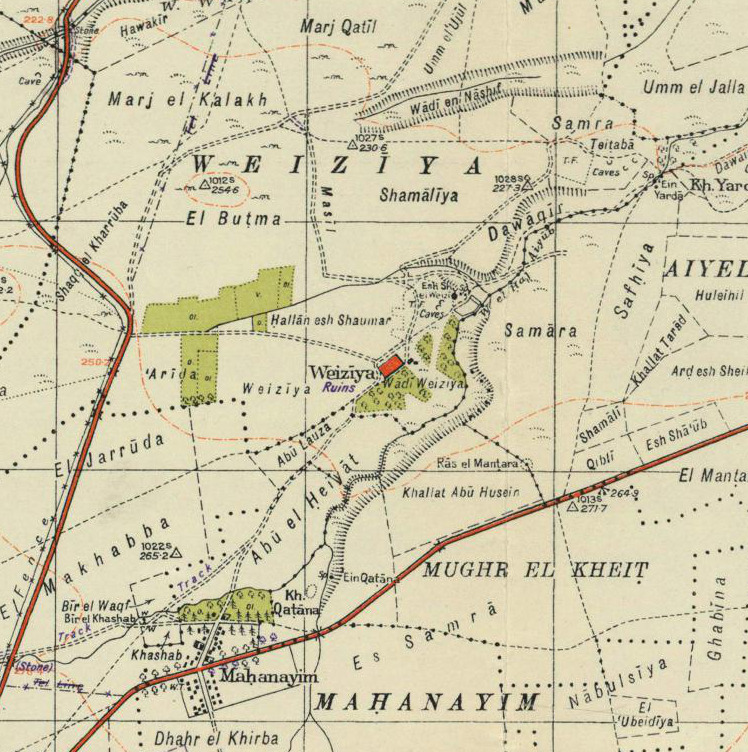
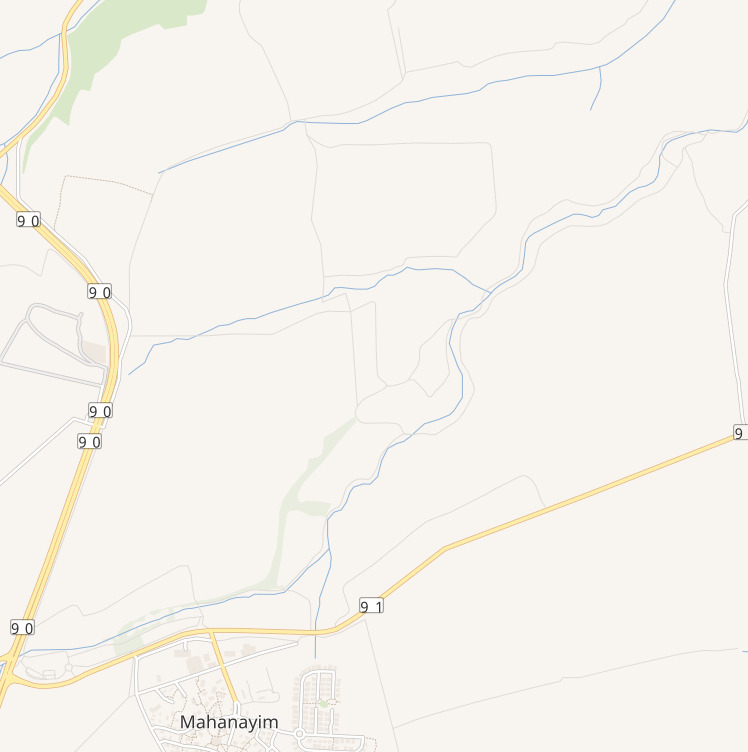
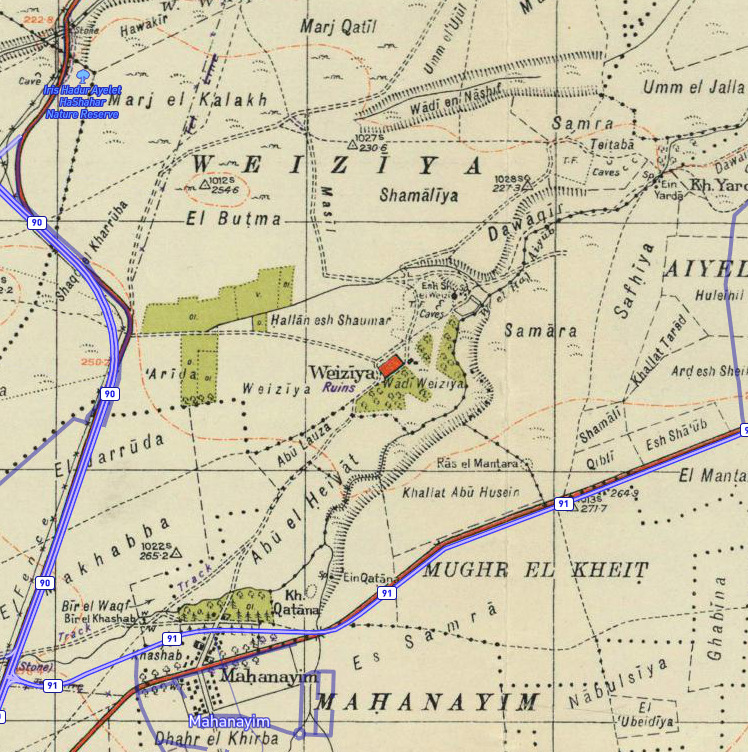
- 1870s map 1940s map modern map 1940s with modern overlay map A series of historical maps of the area around Al-Wayziyya (click the buttons)

- Location within Mandatory Palestine
- Coordinates: 33°0′4″N 35°34′37″E
- Palestine grid: 204/267
- Geopolitical entity: Mandatory Palestine
- Subdistrict: Safad
- Date of depopulation: May 1948

Population (1945)
  - Total: 100

Al-Wayziyya (Arabic: الويزية) was a Palestinian village in the Safad Subdistrict, located south east of Yarda. It was depopulated during the 1947–48 Civil War in Mandatory Palestine on May 1, 1948, by the Palmach's First Battalion of Operation Yiftach. It was located 8.5 km northeast of Safad.

In 1945, the village had a population of 100. A shrine for a local sage known as al-Shaykh al-Wayzi was located in the village.

== History ==
The majority of the villagers were Bedouin farmers. A shrine for Shaykh al-Wayzi and a quarry were located nearby.

=== British Mandate era ===
In the 1922 census of Palestine conducted by the British Mandate authorities, Wazia had a population of 30, all Muslim.

In the 1945 statistics the population was 100 Muslims, with a total of 6,361 dunams of land, according to an official land and population survey. Of this, Arabs used 795 dunums for plantations or irrigable land, 1,623 for cereals; while a total of 2,114 dunams was classified as uncultivable.

=== 1948, aftermath ===
During the 1948 war, nearby Mughr al-Khayt was struck by mortars on 2 May, while villages to the north were evacuated earlier because of the threat of the oncoming war.

Today there are no Israeli settlements on village lands and the shrine of Shaykh al-Wayzi is the only remaining landmark. Only rubble and grasses and trees remain, although the Zionists established the settlement of Mahanayim in 1939, which is located about 1.5 km southeast of where Al-Wayziyya was located.

== Bibliography ==
- Barron, J. B., ed. (1923). Palestine: Report and General Abstracts of the Census of 1922. Government of Palestine.
- Department of Statistics (1945). Village Statistics, April, 1945. Government of Palestine.
- Hadawi, S. (1970). Village Statistics of 1945: A Classification of Land and Area ownership in Palestine. Palestine Liberation Organization Research Center. Archived from the original on 2018-12-08.
- Khalidi, W. (1992). All That Remains:The Palestinian Villages Occupied and Depopulated by Israel in 1948. Washington D.C.: Institute for Palestine Studies. ISBN 0-88728-224-5.
- Morris, B. (2004). The Birth of the Palestinian Refugee Problem Revisited. Cambridge University Press. ISBN 978-0-521-00967-6.
