= Al-Shawka al-Tahta =

Al-Shawka al-Tahta الشوكة التحتا
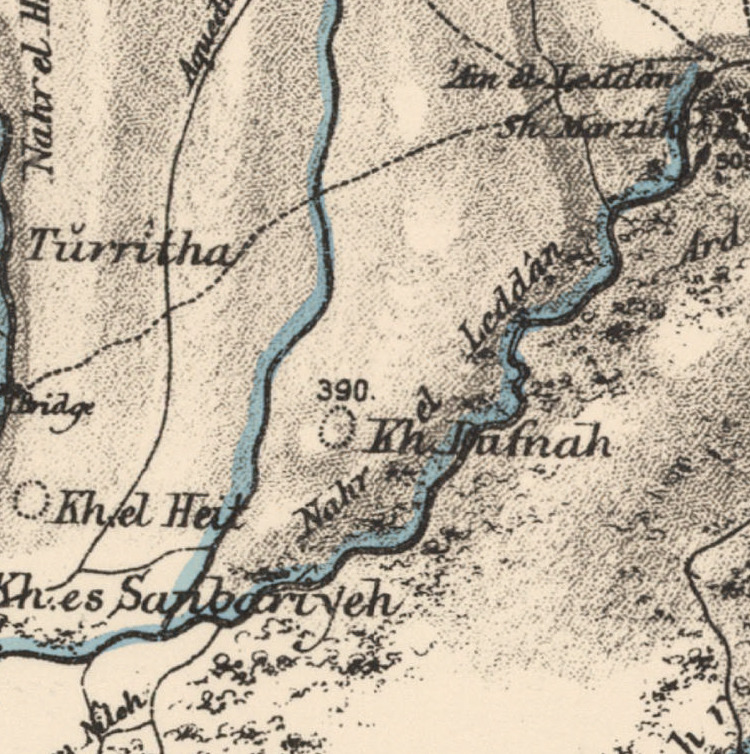
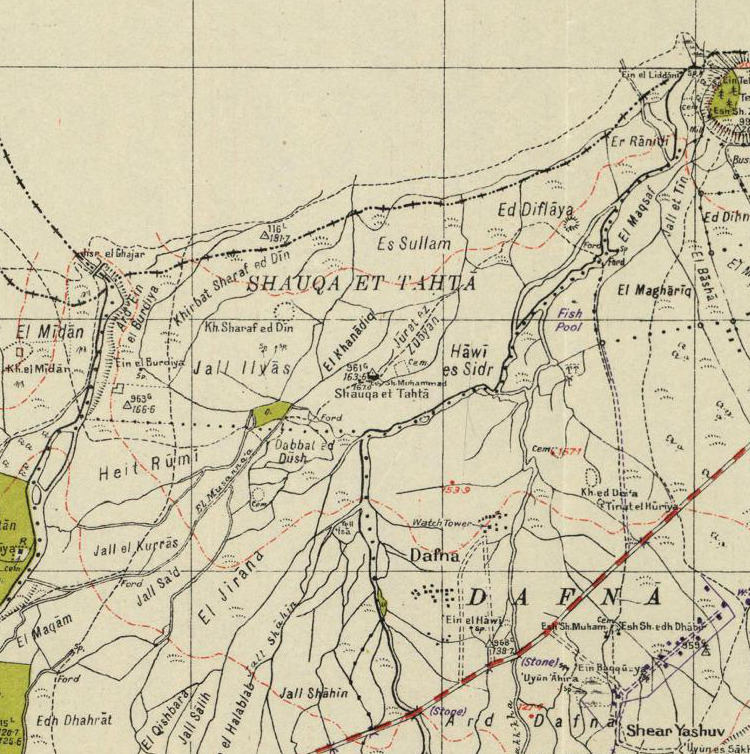
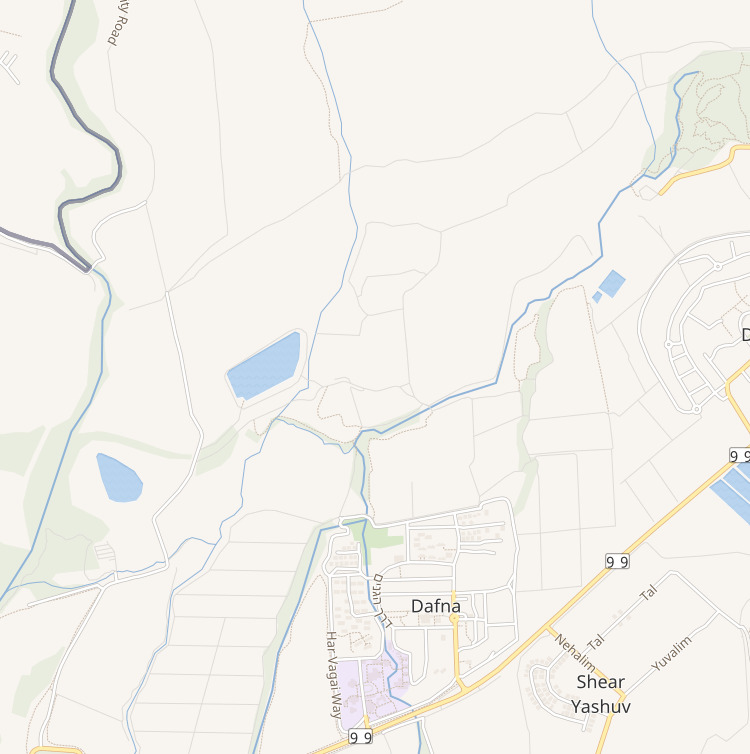
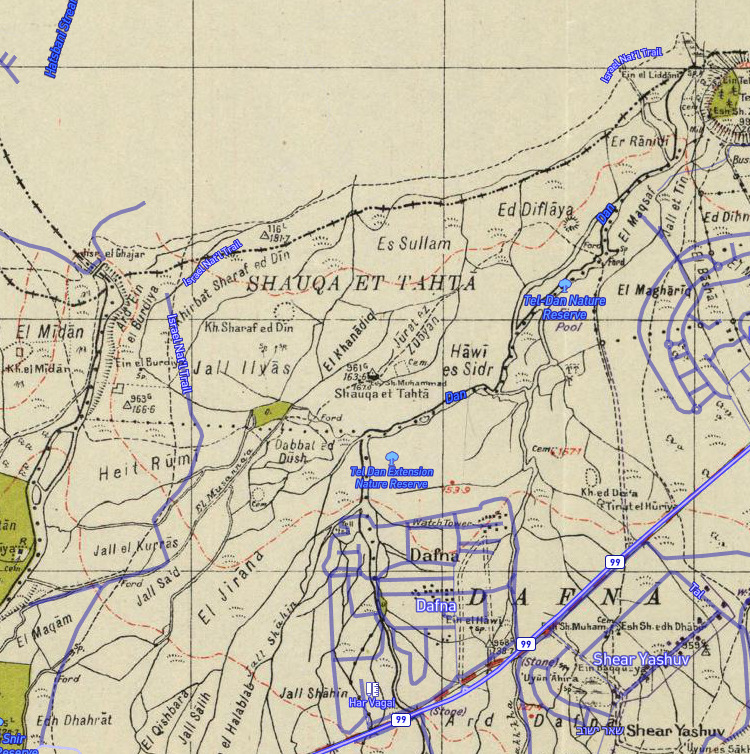
- 1870s map 1940s map modern map 1940s with modern overlay map A series of historical maps of the area around Al-Shawka al-Tahta (click the buttons)

- Location within Mandatory Palestine
- Coordinates: 33°14′19″N 35°38′12″E
- Palestine grid: 209/293
- Geopolitical entity: Mandatory Palestine
- Subdistrict: Safad
- Date of depopulation: May 14, 1948

Area
  - Total: 2,132 dunams (2.132 km^{2}; 0.823 sq mi)

Population (1945)
  - Total: 200
- Cause(s) of depopulation: Fear of being caught up in the fighting

Al-Shawka al-Tahta was a Palestinian Arab village in the Safad Subdistrict. It was depopulated during the 1947–1948 Civil War in Mandatory Palestine on May 14, 1948, by the Palmach's First Battalion of Operation Yiftach. It was located 31.5 km northeast of Safad.

== History ==
The village contained two khirbas known as Tall al-Qadi and Khirbat al-Day'a.

In 1881 the Survey of Western Palestine identified Khirbet Dufnah, meaning "the ruin of Daphne (oleander). Recent research has linked Shawka al-Taḥtā to Daphne, a geographic designation mentioned in classical sources for the marshy landscapes of the northern Hula Valley. Archaeological and toponymic evidence indicates that the name survived into the Ottoman period as Dafna, attested in sixteenth-century tax registers and nineteenth-century surveys, before being replaced by the village name Shawka al-Taḥtā in the modern period. This continuity suggests long-term reuse of the same landscape rather than a complete break in settlement or local memory.

=== British Mandate era ===
In the 1931 census of Palestine, during the British Mandate for Palestine, the village had a population of 136, all Muslims, in a total of 31 houses.

In the 1945 statistics it had a population of 200 Muslims with a total land area of 2,132 dunams. Of this, 1,845 dunams were allocated for plantations and irrigable land, 140 for cereals, while 17 dunams were classified as non-cultivable areas.

== Bibliography ==
- Department of Statistics (1945). Village Statistics, April, 1945. Government of Palestine.
- Hadawi, S. (1970). Village Statistics of 1945: A Classification of Land and Area ownership in Palestine. Palestine Liberation Organization Research Center. Archived from the original on 2018-12-08.
- Khalidi, W. (1992). All That Remains:The Palestinian Villages Occupied and Depopulated by Israel in 1948. Washington D.C.: Institute for Palestine Studies. ISBN 0-88728-224-5.
- Mills, E., ed. (1932). Census of Palestine 1931. Population of Villages, Towns and Administrative Areas. Jerusalem: Government of Palestine.
- Morris, B. (2004). The Birth of the Palestinian Refugee Problem Revisited. Cambridge University Press. ISBN 978-0-521-00967-6.
- Palmer, E.H. (1881). The Survey of Western Palestine: Arabic and English Name Lists Collected During the Survey by Lieutenants Conder and Kitchener, R. E. Transliterated and Explained by E.H. Palmer. Committee of the Palestine Exploration Fund.
