= Khirbat al-Muntar =

Khirbat al-Muntar خربة المُنطار
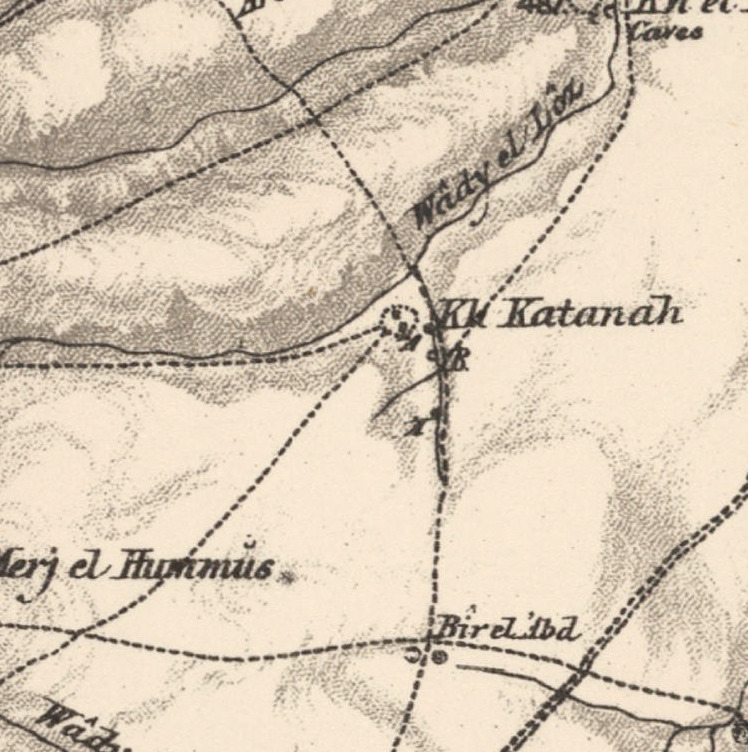
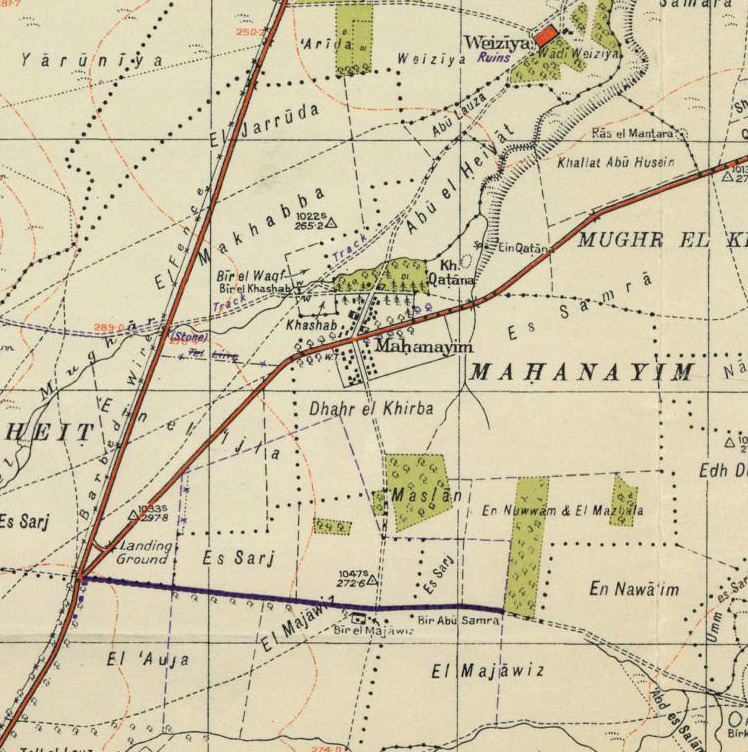
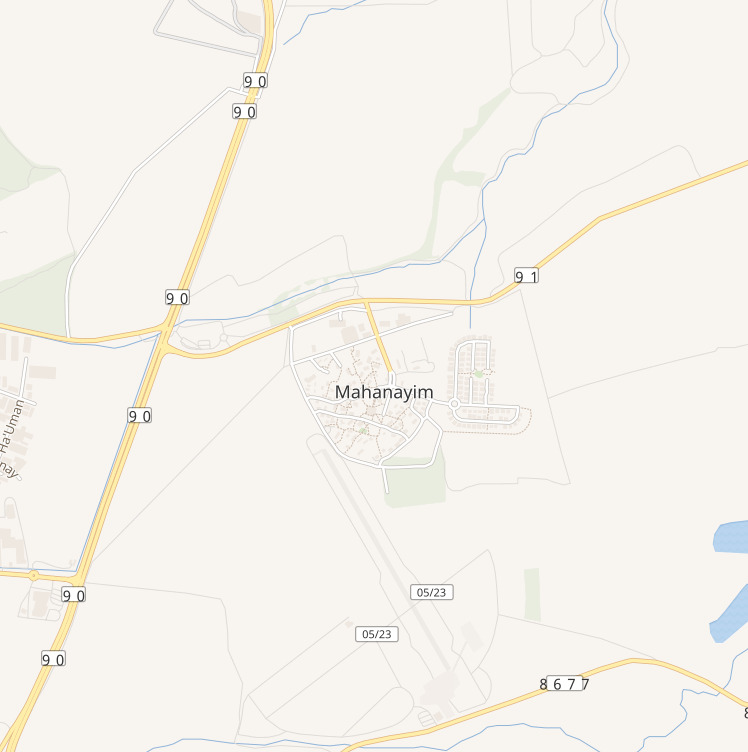
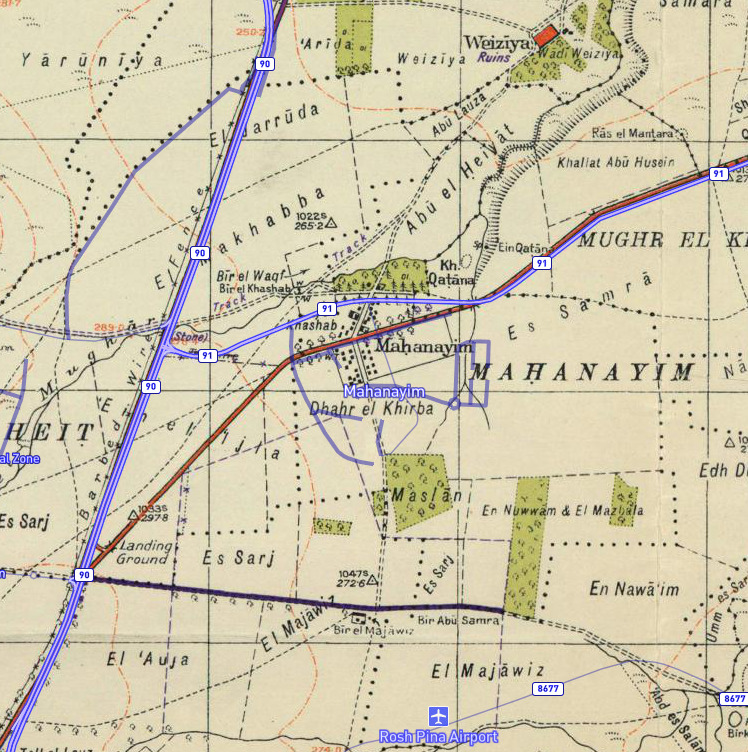
- 1870s map 1940s map modern map 1940s with modern overlay map A series of historical maps of the area around Khirbat al-Muntar (click the buttons)

- Location within Mandatory Palestine
- Coordinates: 32°59′21″N 35°34′13″E
- Palestine grid: 205/265
- Geopolitical entity: Mandatory Palestine
- Subdistrict: Safad

Khirbat al-Muntar was a Palestinian Arab village in the Safad Subdistrict. It was depopulated during the 1948 Arab-Israeli War by Palmach's First Battalion and 'Oded Brigade of Operation Yiftach after resistance by the Syrian Army. It was located 8.5 km east of Safad.

== History ==
In 1838, Edward Robinson noted al-Muntar as an encampment of Turkish and Kurdish nomads.

At the end of the 19th century, much of the land was purchased by Baron Rothschild, and Mahanayim was established in 1898 on former Khirbat al-Muntar land. Mahanayim failed and was abandoned, but reestablished in 1939.

In the 1945 statistics, during the British Mandate of Palestine, Khirbat al-Muntar was counted under Mahanayim, and Arabs owned only 52 dunams out of a total of 2,472 dunums of land. All of the 52 dunums were for used cereals.

== Bibliography ==
- Department of Statistics (1945). Village Statistics, April, 1945. Government of Palestine.
- Hadawi, S. (1970). Village Statistics of 1945: A Classification of Land and Area ownership in Palestine. Palestine Liberation Organization Research Center. Archived from the original on 2018-12-08.
- Khalidi, W. (1992). All That Remains:The Palestinian Villages Occupied and Depopulated by Israel in 1948. Washington D.C.: Institute for Palestine Studies. ISBN 0-88728-224-5.
- Morris, B. (2004). The Birth of the Palestinian Refugee Problem Revisited. Cambridge University Press. ISBN 978-0-521-00967-6.
- Robinson, E.; Smith, E. (1841). Biblical Researches in Palestine, Mount Sinai and Arabia Petraea: A Journal of Travels in the year 1838. Vol. 3. Boston: Crocker & Brewster.
