= Al-Shuna =

Al-Shuna الشونة
- Village
- Etymology: Kŭlảt esh Shûneh, the castle of the granary
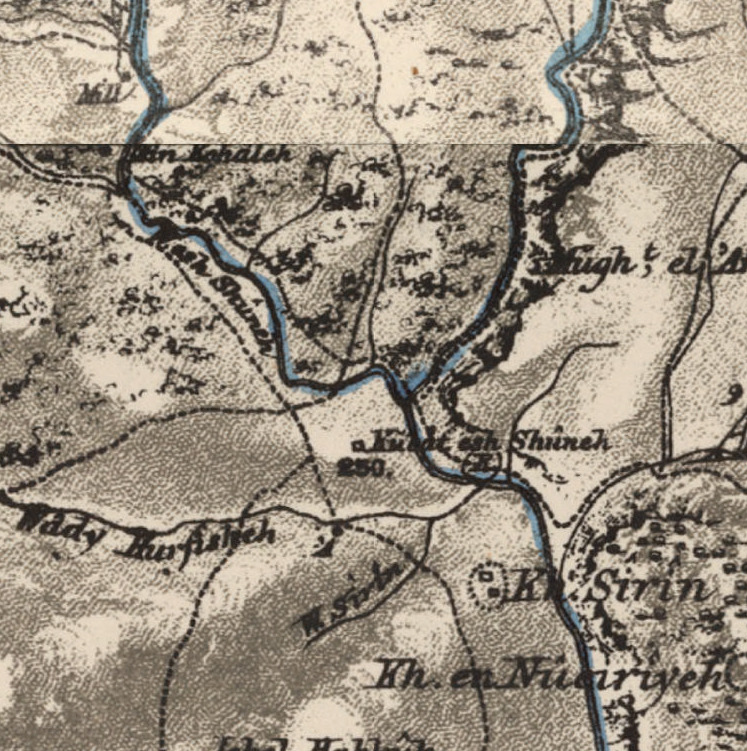
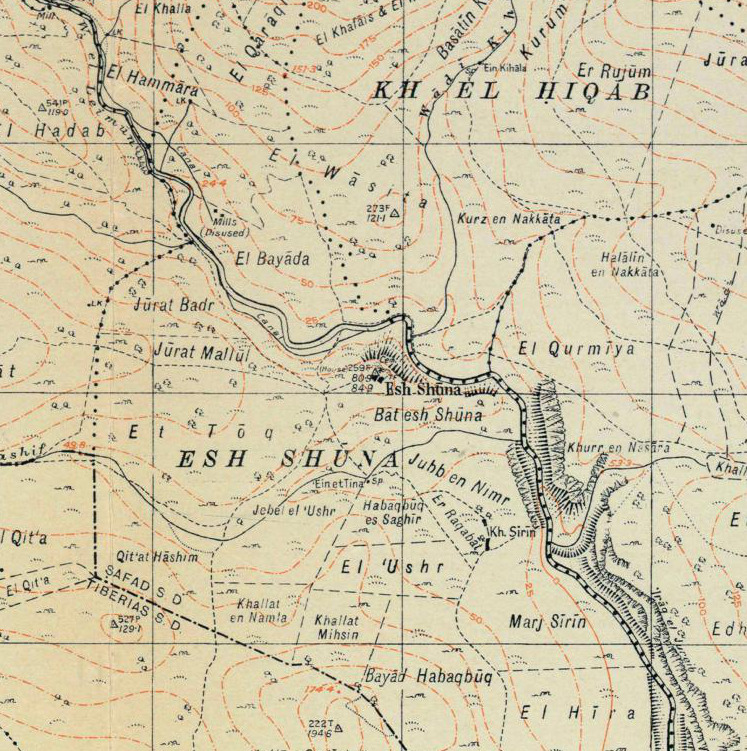
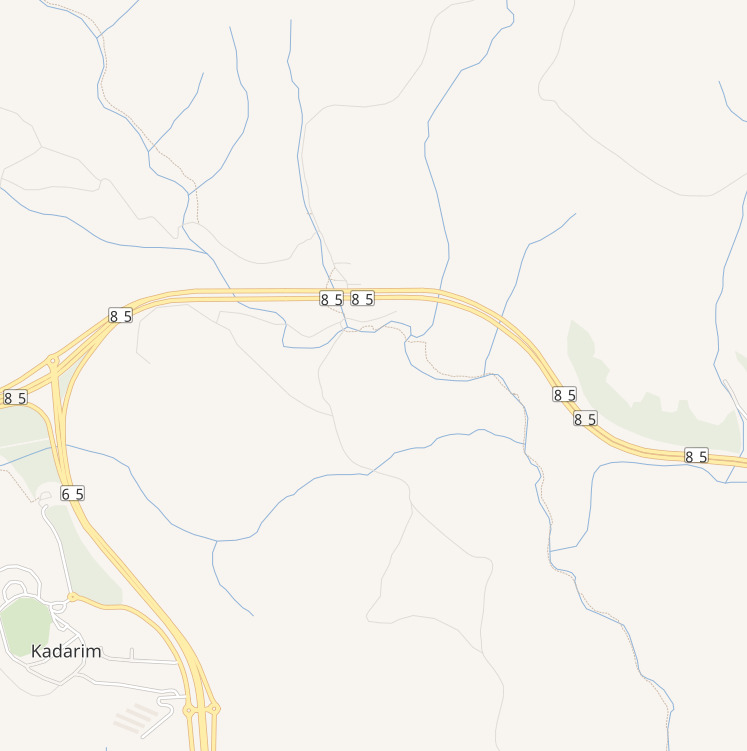
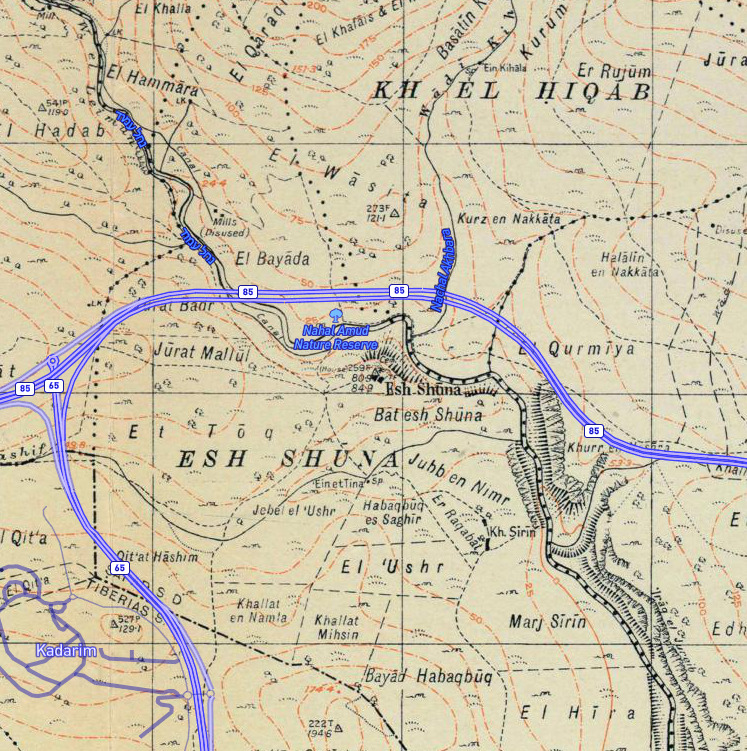
- 1870s map 1940s map modern map 1940s with modern overlay map A series of historical maps of the area around Al-Shuna (click the buttons)

- Location within Mandatory Palestine
- Coordinates: 32°54′30″N 35°29′13″E
- Palestine grid: 195/257
- Geopolitical entity: Mandatory Palestine
- Subdistrict: Safad
- Date of depopulation: "Not known"

Area
  - Total: 3,660 dunams (3.66 km^{2}; 1.41 sq mi)

Population (1945)
  - Total: 170

Al-Shuna (Arabic: الشونة) was a Palestinian Arab village in the Safad Subdistrict. It was ethnically cleansed and depopulated during the 1947–1948 Civil War in Mandatory Palestine on April 30, 1948, by the Palmach's First Battalion of Operation Yiftach. It was located 6 km south of Safad, overlooking the deep gorge of Wadi al-'Amud.

== History ==
Victor Guérin describes this place in 1875 as "built of white limestone mixed with stones of black basalt in alternate courses. We think that although this custom is common in modern Arab building, it can be shown to have been an ancient usage, so that the building may be old. Round it are the vestiges of a ruined hamlet."

In 1881 the PEF's Survey of Western Palestine found at Kŭlảt esh Shûneh: "A modern Arab building of basaltic stone; used probably as a barn, as the name implies".

=== British Mandate era ===
In the 1922 census of Palestine Shuneh had a population of 83; all Muslim, increasing in the 1931 census to 337, still all Muslims, in a total of 65 houses.

In the 1945 statistics the population was 170 Muslims, with a total of 3,660 dunams of land, according to an official land and population survey. Of this, 995 dunums were used for cereals, while 2,481 dunams was non-cultivable area.

The village had a school and a mosque.

=== 1948, aftermath ===
Today, a wildlife sanctuary known as the Nachal 'Amud Reserve is located in the vicinity.

== Bibliography ==
- Barron, J. B., ed. (1923). Palestine: Report and General Abstracts of the Census of 1922. Government of Palestine.
- Conder, C.R.; Kitchener, H.H. (1881). The Survey of Western Palestine: Memoirs of the Topography, Orography, Hydrography, and Archaeology. Vol. 1. London: Committee of the Palestine Exploration Fund.
- Department of Statistics (1945). Village Statistics, April, 1945. Government of Palestine.
- Guérin, V. (1880). Description Géographique Historique et Archéologique de la Palestine (in French). Vol. 3: Galilee, pt. 1. Paris: L'Imprimerie Nationale.
- Hadawi, S. (1970). Village Statistics of 1945: A Classification of Land and Area ownership in Palestine. Palestine Liberation Organization Research Center. Archived from the original on 2018-12-08.
- Khalidi, W. (1992). All That Remains: The Palestinian Villages Occupied and Depopulated by Israel in 1948. Washington D.C.: Institute for Palestine Studies. ISBN 0-88728-224-5.
- Mills, E., ed. (1932). Census of Palestine 1931. Population of Villages, Towns and Administrative Areas. Jerusalem: Government of Palestine.
- Morris, B. (2004). The Birth of the Palestinian Refugee Problem Revisited. Cambridge University Press. ISBN 978-0-521-00967-6.
- Palmer, E. H. (1881). The Survey of Western Palestine: Arabic and English Name Lists Collected During the Survey by Lieutenants Conder and Kitchener, R. E. Transliterated and Explained by E.H. Palmer. Committee of the Palestine Exploration Fund.
