= Safad Subdistrict, Mandatory Palestine =

Administrative division of British Palestine (1920–1948)

Safad Subdistrict قضاء صفد נפת צפת
- Subdistrict of Mandatory Palestine
- 1920–1948
- Capital: Safad
- Demonym: safadi (male) safadiyyah (female) (ar)
- Area
  - 1945: 696 km^{2} (269 sq mi)
- Population
  - 1931: 39,713
  - 1945: 53,620
- History
  - Established: 1920
  - Disestablished: 1948
Preceded by	Succeeded by
Acre Sanjak	Safed Subdistrict
- Today part of: Israel

The Safad Subdistrict (Arabic: قضاء صفد; Hebrew: נפת צפת) was one of the subdistricts of Mandatory Palestine before it was captured by Israel in 1948. It was located around the city of Safad. The area of the subdistrict amounted to 696 km^{2} in 1945, a decrease from 750 km^{2} during the late Ottoman period.

After the 1948 Arab-Israeli War, the subdistrict, which fell entirely within modern-day Israel, became the modern-day Safed Subdistrict in the Northern District (Israel).

== Borders ==
- Acre Subdistrict (South West)
- Tiberias Subdistrict (South)
- Lebanon (North)
- Syria (East)

== Towns and villages ==
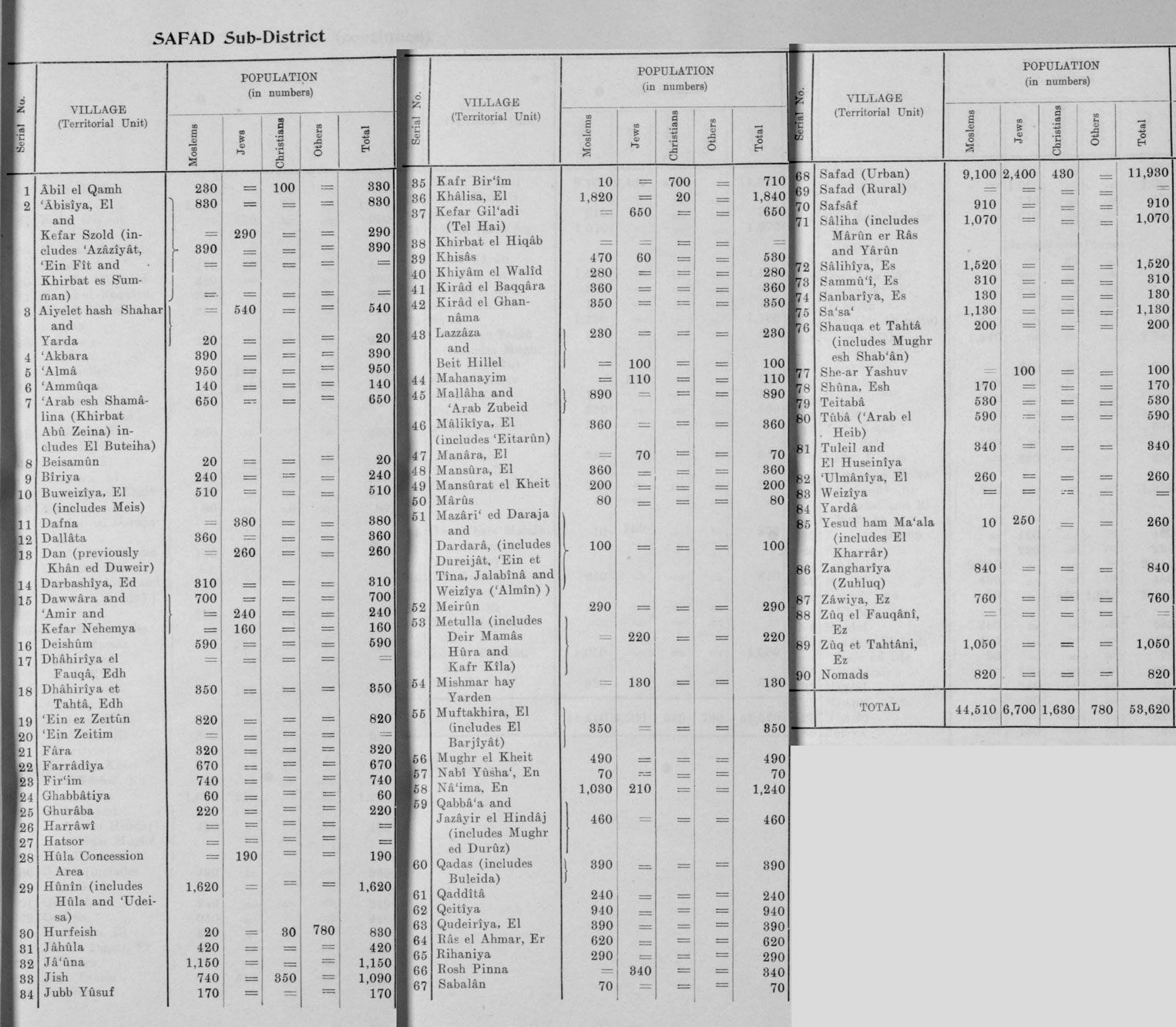
Official population statistics for the sub-district, from Village Statistics, 1945.

Safad Sub-District – Population by Village
Village	Muslims	Jews	Christians	Others	Total
Abil el Qamh	230		100		330
'Abisiyya (El)	830				830
Kefar Szold		290			290
‘Azaziyat, ‘Ein Fit and Khirbat es Summan	390				390
Aiyelet hash Shahar		540			540
Yarda	20				20
'Akbara	390				390
'Alma	950				950
'Ammiqa	140				140
'Arab esh Shamlina (Khirbat Abu Zeina, includes El Buteiha)	650				650
Beisamun	20				20
Biriya	240				240
Buweiziya (El, includes Meis)	510				510
Dafna		380			380
Dallata	360				360
Dan (previously Khan ed Duweir)		260			260
Darbashiya (Ed)	310				310
Dawwara	700				700
'Amir		240			240
Kefar Nehemya		160			160
Deishum	590				590
Dhahiriya el Fauqa (Edh Dhahiriya et Tahta)	350				350
'Ein ez Zeitun	820				820
'Ein Zeitim					
Fara	320				320
Farradiya	670				670
Fir‘im	740				740
Ghabbatiya	60				60
Ghuraba	220				220
Harrawi					
Hatsor					
Hula Concession Area		190			190
Hunin (includes Hula and ‘Udeisa)	1,620				1,620
Hurfeish	20		30	780	830
Jahula	420				420
Ja‘una	1,150				1,150
Jish	740		350		1,090
Jubb Yusuf	170				170
Kafr Bir‘im	10		700		710
Khalisa (El)	1,820		20		1,840
Kefar Gil‘adi (Tel Hai)		650			650
Khirbat el Hiqab					
Khisas	470	60			530
Khiyam el Walid	280				280
Kirad el Baqqara	360				360
Kirad el Ghannama	350				350
Lazzaza	230				230
Beit Hillel		100			100
Mahanaim		110			110
Mallaha and 'Arab Zubeid	890				890
Malikiyya (El, includes ‘Eitarun)	360				360
Manara		70			70
Mansura (El)	360				360
Mansurat el Kheit	200				200
Marus	80				80
Mazari‘ ed Daraja and Dadara (includes Dureijat, ‘Ein et Tina, Jalabina and Weiziya (‘Almin))	100				100
Meirun	290				290
Metulla (includes Deir Mamas Hura and Kafr Kila)		220			220
Mishmar hay Yarden		130			130
Muftakhira (El, includes El Barjiyat)	350				350
Mughr el Kheit	490				490
Nabi Yusha‘ (En)	70				70
Na‘ima (En)	1,030	210			1,240
Qabba‘a and Jazayir el Hindaj (includes Mughr ed Duruz)	460				460
Qadas (includes Buleida)	390				390
Qaddita	240				240
Qeitiya	940				940
Qudeiriya (El)	390				390
Ras el Ahmar (Er)	620				620
Rihaniya	290				290
Rosh Pinna		340			340
Sabalan	70				70
Safad (Urban)	9,100	2,400	430		11,930
Safad (Rural)					
Safsaf	910				910
Saliha (includes Marun er Ras and Yarun)	1,070				1,070
Salihiya (Es)	1,520				1,520
Sammu‘i (Es)	310				310
Sanbariya (Es)	130				130
Sa‘sa‘	1,130				1,130
Shauqa et Tahta (includes Mughr esh Sha‘ban)	200				200
She-ar Yashuv		100			100
Shuna (Esh)	170				170
Teitaba	530				530
Tuba (‘Arab el Heib)	590				590
Tuleil and El Huseiniya	340				340
'Ulmaniya (El)	260				260
Weiziya					
Yarda					
Yesud ham Ma‘ala (includes El Kharrar)	10	250			260
Zanghariya (Zuhluq)	840				840
Zawiya (Ez)	760				760
Zuq el Fauqani (Ez)					
Zuq et Tahtani (Ez)	1,050				1,050
Nomads	820				820
TOTAL	44,510	6,700	1,630	780	53,620

=== Depopulated towns and villages ===
(current localities in parentheses)

- Abil al-Qamh (Yuval)
- al-'Abisiyya
- 'Akbara
- Alma (Alma)
- Ammuqa ('Ammuqa)
- Arab al-Shamalina (Almaghor)
- Arab al-Zubayd
- Baysamun
- Biriyya (Birya)
- al-Butayha (Almagor)
- al-Buwayziyya
- Dallata (Dalton)
- al-Dawwara ('Ammir, Sde Nehemia)
- Dayshum (Dishon)
- al-Dirbashiyya
- al-Dirdara
- Ein al-Zeitun
- Fara
- Farradiyya (Parod, Shefer)
- Fir'im (Hatzor HaGlilit)
- Ghabbatiyya
- Ghuraba
- al-Hamra'
- Harrawi
- Hunin (Margaliot)
- al-Husayniyya (Haluta, Sde Eliezer)
- Jahula
- al-Ja'una (Rosh Pinna)
- Jubb Yusuf (Ami'ad)
- Kafr Bir'im (Bar'am, Dovev)
- al-Khalisa (Kiryat Shemona)
- Khan al-Duwayr (Amnun)
- Khirbat Karraza
- al-Khisas (HaGoshrim)
- Khiyam al-Walid (Lehavot HaBashan)
- Kirad al-Baqqara (Gadot, Mishmar HaYarden)
- Kirad al-Ghannama (Ayelet HaShahar, Gadot)
- Lazzaza
- Madahil
- Al-Malkiyya (Malkia)
- Mallaha
- al-Manshiyya
- al-Mansura (She'ar Yashuv)
- Mansurat al-Khayt
- Marus
- Meiron (Meron, Israel)
- al-Muftakhira (Shamir)
- Mughr al-Khayt (Hatzor HaGlilit, Rosh Pinna)
- Khirbat al-Muntar
- al-Nabi Yusha' (Ramot Naftali)
- al-Na'ima (Beit Hillel, Kfar Blum, Neot Mordechai)
- Qabba'a
- Qadas (Malkia, Ramot Naftali, Yiftah)
- Qaddita
- Qaytiyya
- al-Qudayriyya
- al-Ras al-Ahmar (Kerem Ben Zimra)
- Sabalan
- Safsaf (Bar Yohai, Kfar Hoshen)
- Saliha (Avirim, Yir'im)
- al-Salihiyya
- al-Sammu'i
- al-Sanbariyya (Dafta, Mayan Barukh)
- Sa'sa' (Sasa)
- Safad (Safed)
- al-Shawka al-Tahta
- al-Shuna
- Taytaba
- Tulayl
- al-'Ulmaniyya
- al-'Urayfiyya
- al-Wayziyya
- Yarda (Ayelet HaShahar, Mishmar HaYarden)
- al-Zahiriyya al-Tahta
- al-Zanghariyya (Elifelet, Kare Deshe)
- al-Zawiya (Neot Mordechai)
- al-Zuq al-Fawqani (Yuval)
- al-Zuq al-Tahtani (Beyt Hillel)
