= Ghabbatiyya =

Ghabbatiyya غبّاطية Ghabbatiya
- Village
- Etymology: Kh. Ghabbâtî, the ruin of Ghabbâti; perhaps from ghabit, “low-lying land”
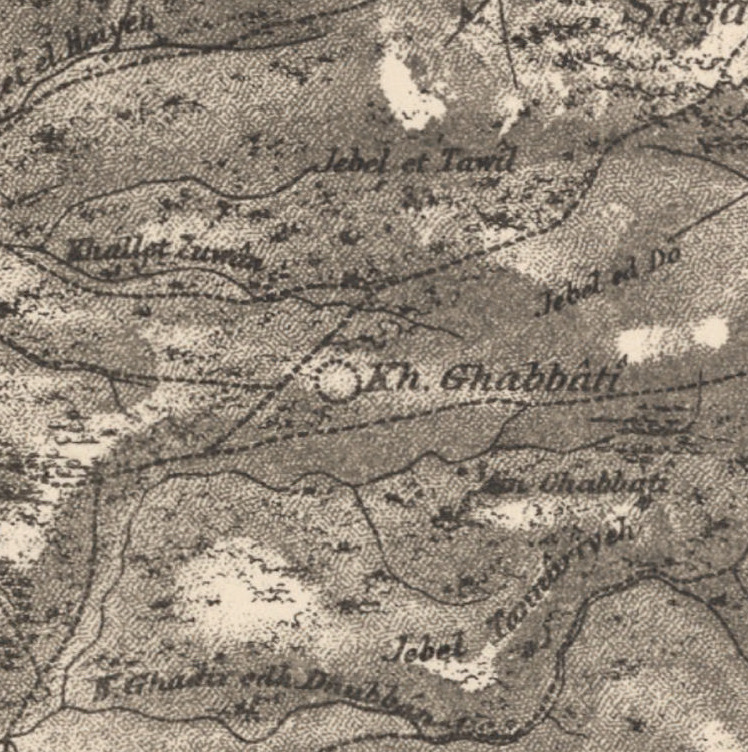
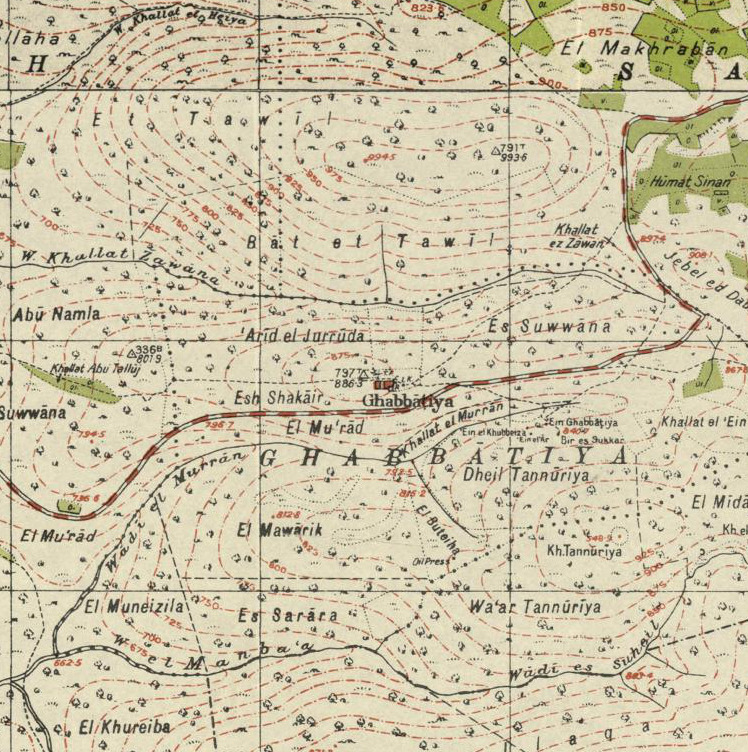
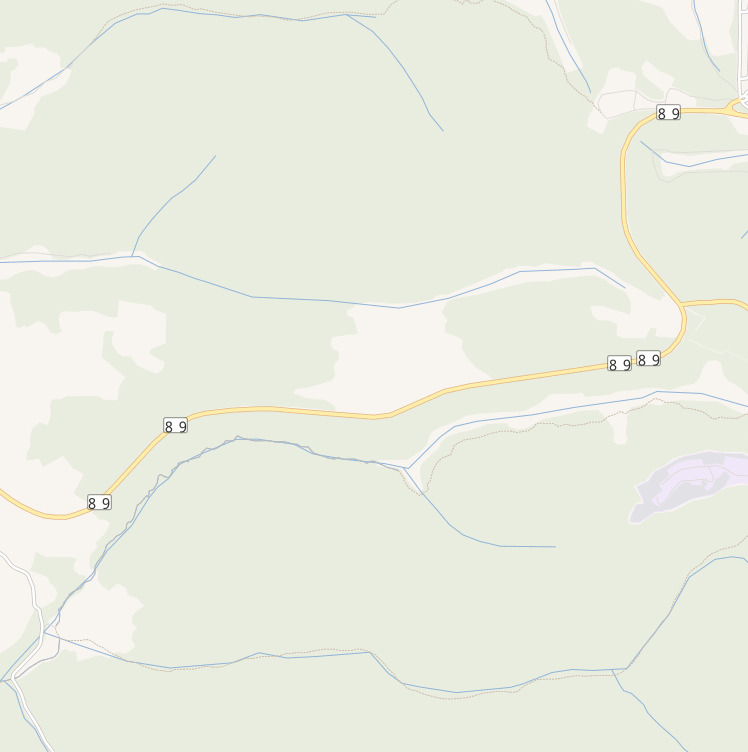
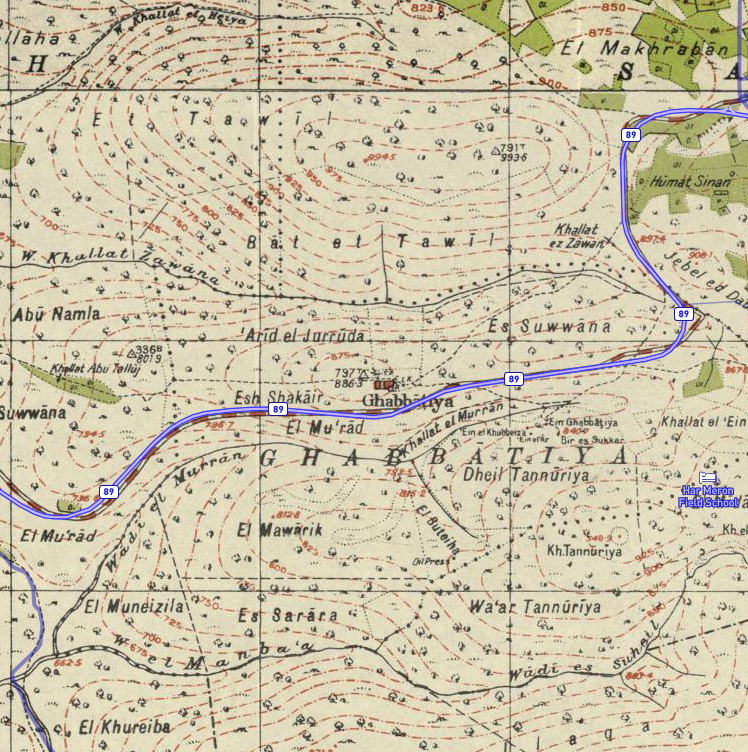
- 1870s map 1940s map modern map 1940s with modern overlay map A series of historical maps of the area around Ghabbatiyya (click the buttons)

- Location within Mandatory Palestine
- Coordinates: 33°00′53″N 35°22′33″E
- Palestine grid: 185/268
- Geopolitical entity: Mandatory Palestine
- Subdistrict: Safad
- Date of depopulation: October 30, 1948

Population (1945)
  - Total: 60

Ghabbatiyya (Arabic: غبّاطية) was a Palestinian Arab hamlet in the Safad Subdistrict. It was depopulated during the 1948 Arab-Israeli War on October 30, 1948, under Operation Hiram. It was located 12 km northwest of Safad.

In 1945 it had a population of 60 Muslims.

== History ==
In 1881 the PEF's Survey of Western Palestine found at Kh. Ghabbâti "foundations of walls and one olive press".

=== British mandate era ===
In the 1922 census of Palestine conducted by the British Mandate authorities, ‘’Ghabbatia’’ had a population of 9 Muslims.

In the 1945 statistics the population was 60 Muslims, with a total of 3,453 dunams of land, according to an official land and population survey. Of this, 15 dunams were plantations and irrigable land, 412 for cereals; while a total of 2,509 dunams was non-cultivable area.

=== 1948, aftermath ===
Israeli forces occupied Ghabbatiyya on 30 October 1948. In 1992 the village site was described: "The site is deserted and covered with grass, a few fig trees, stones, and the ruins of stone houses. The walls of one destroyed house still stand. The surrounding land is used by Israelis for grazing and forestry, and woods cover nearby Mount ‘Adathir."

== Bibliography ==
- Barron, J.B., ed. (1923). Palestine: Report and General Abstracts of the Census of 1922. Government of Palestine.
- Conder, C.R.; Kitchener, H.H. (1881). The Survey of Western Palestine: Memoirs of the Topography, Orography, Hydrography, and Archaeology. Vol. 1. London: Committee of the Palestine Exploration Fund.
- Department of Statistics (1945). Village Statistics, April, 1945. Government of Palestine.
- Hadawi, S. (1970). Village Statistics of 1945: A Classification of Land and Area ownership in Palestine. Palestine Liberation Organization Research Center.
- Khalidi, W. (1992). All That Remains: The Palestinian Villages Occupied and Depopulated by Israel in 1948. Washington D.C.: Institute for Palestine Studies. ISBN 0-88728-224-5.
- Morris, B. (2004). The Birth of the Palestinian Refugee Problem Revisited. Cambridge University Press. ISBN 978-0-521-00967-6.
- Palmer, E.H. (1881). The Survey of Western Palestine: Arabic and English Name Lists Collected During the Survey by Lieutenants Conder and Kitchener, R. E. Transliterated and Explained by E.H. Palmer. Committee of the Palestine Exploration Fund.
