= Al-Dirdara =

Al-Dirdara الدردارة
- Village
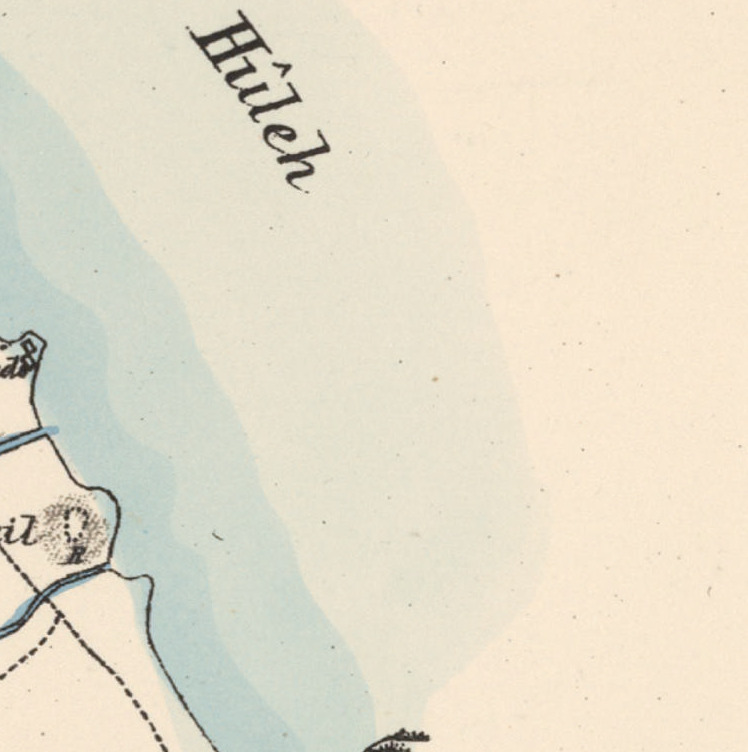
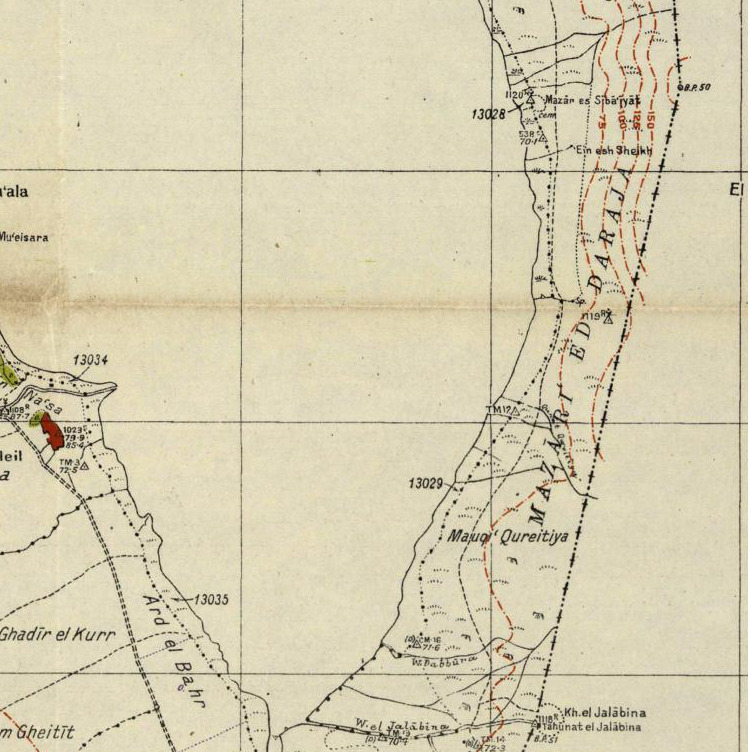
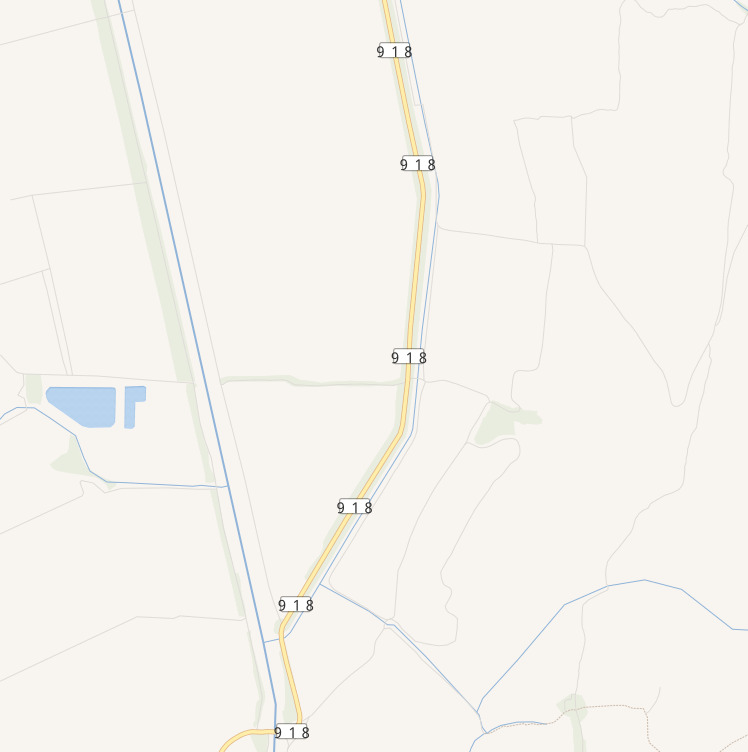
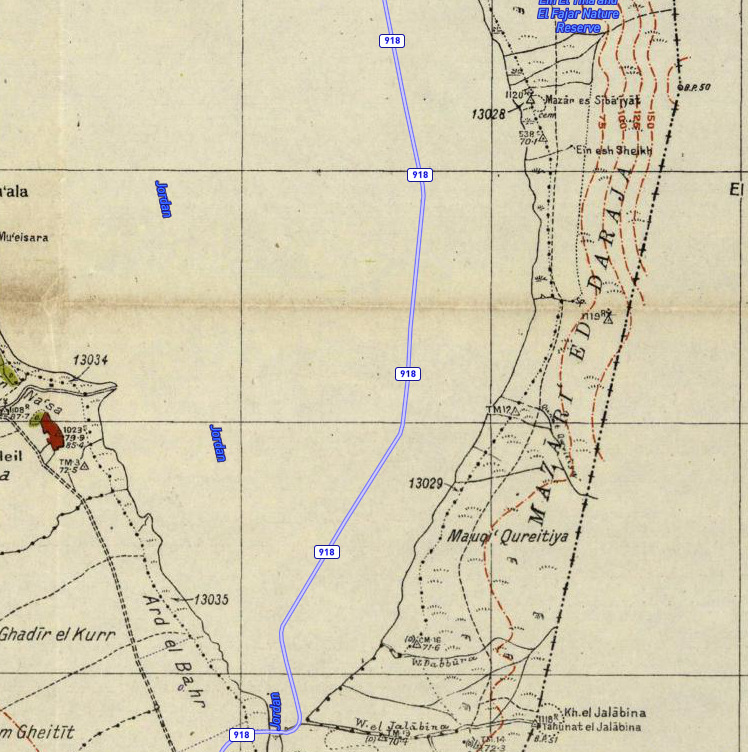
- 1870s map 1940s map modern map 1940s with modern overlay map A series of historical maps of the area around Al-Dirdara (click the buttons)

- Location within Mandatory Palestine
- Coordinates: 33°03′05″N 35°38′24″E
- Palestine grid: 209/272
- Geopolitical entity: Mandatory Palestine
- Subdistrict: Safad
- Date of depopulation: May 1, 1948

Area
  - Total: 6,361 dunams (6.361 km^{2}; 2.456 sq mi)

Population (1945)
  - Total: 100

Al-Dirdara (Arabic: الدردارة), also known as Mazari ed Daraja, was a Palestinian Arab village in the Safad Subdistrict. It was depopulated during the 1947–1948 Civil War in Mandatory Palestine on May 1, 1948, under Operation Yiftach. It was located 13 km east of Safad.

In 1945 it had a population of 100.

== History ==
The village was located in the middle of a flat plain overlooking the Hula Valley Plain to the north and south. The villagers cultivated grain, vegetables, citrus, almonds, and figs.

In 1944/5 it had a population of 100 Muslims, with a total of 6,361 dunums of land. Of this, 1,623 were used for cereal, 795 were irrigated or used for orchards, while 2,025 dunams were classified as non-cultivable land.

The Jewish settlement of Eyal was founded on village land in 1947, but was destroyed in the 1948 war.

=== 1948, aftermath ===
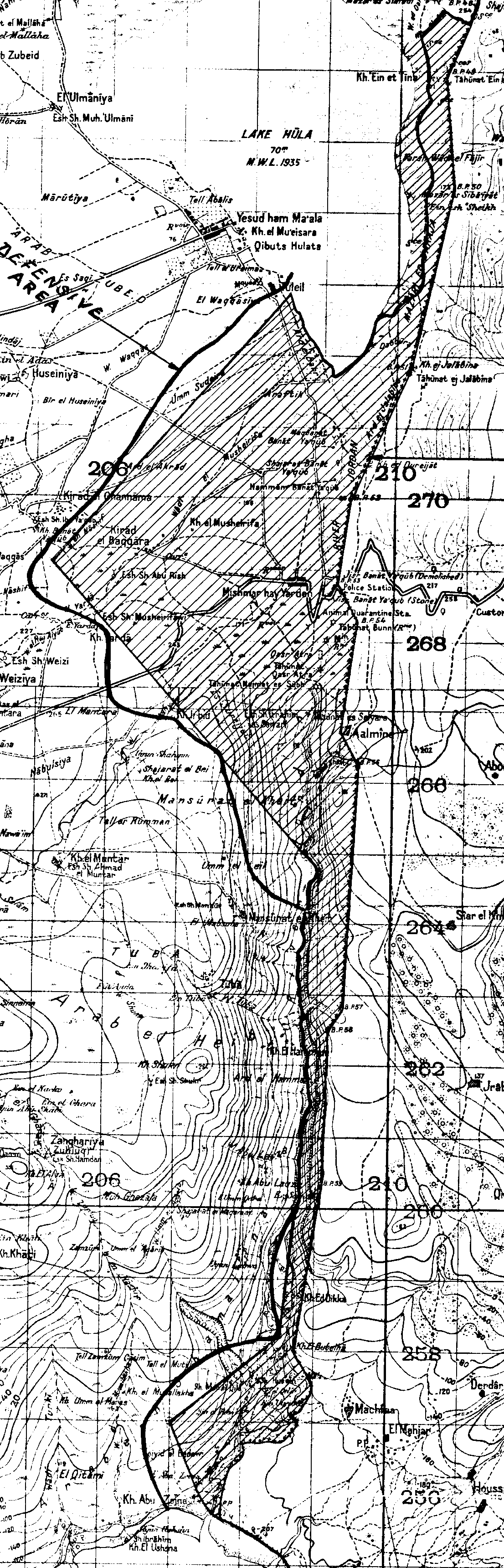
The village was in the Demilitarized Zone, per the Israel–Syria Mixed Armistice Commission.

The precise date is not clear when al-Dirdara was occupied by Israeli forces but is believed to have been late April or early May. By July 1948 Israeli forces controlled the villages, although Syrian forces had tried to recapture the village but were forced to withdraw, losing over fifty men. They signed an armistice agreement in July 1949, creating a demilitarized zone.

After the Al-Dirdara Palestinian inhabitants had been expelled, Israel tried to resettle Eyal, this time calling it ha-Goeverim. In 1953, they changed the name to Ashmura. Pr. 1992 it was not inhabited.

In 1992 the village site was described: "The site is a mound of stones and earth, overgrown with trees. There is a canal at the northern edge through which water flows in a north-south direction. The area around the site is cultivated."

== Bibliography ==
- Department of Statistics (1945). Village Statistics, April, 1945. Government of Palestine.
- Hadawi, S. (1970). Village Statistics of 1945: A Classification of Land and Area ownership in Palestine. Palestine Liberation Organization Research Centre. Archived from the original on 2018-12-08.
- Khalidi, W. (1992). All That Remains:The Palestinian Villages Occupied and Depopulated by Israel in 1948. Washington D.C.: Institute for Palestine Studies. ISBN 0-88728-224-5.
- Morris, B. (2004). The Birth of the Palestinian Refugee Problem Revisited. Cambridge University Press. ISBN 978-0-521-00967-6.
