= Lazzaza =

Lazzaza لزّازة
- Village
- Etymology: “fastening”,
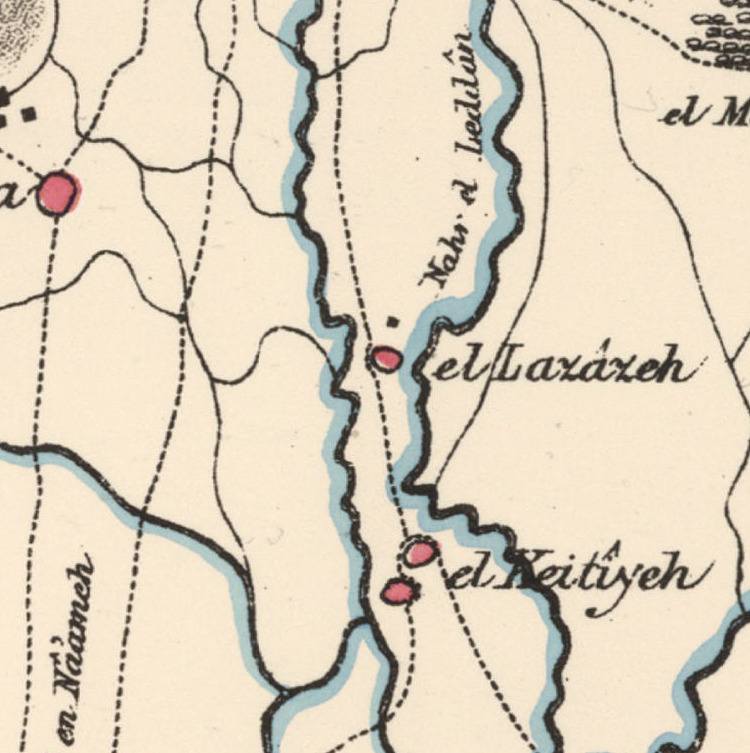
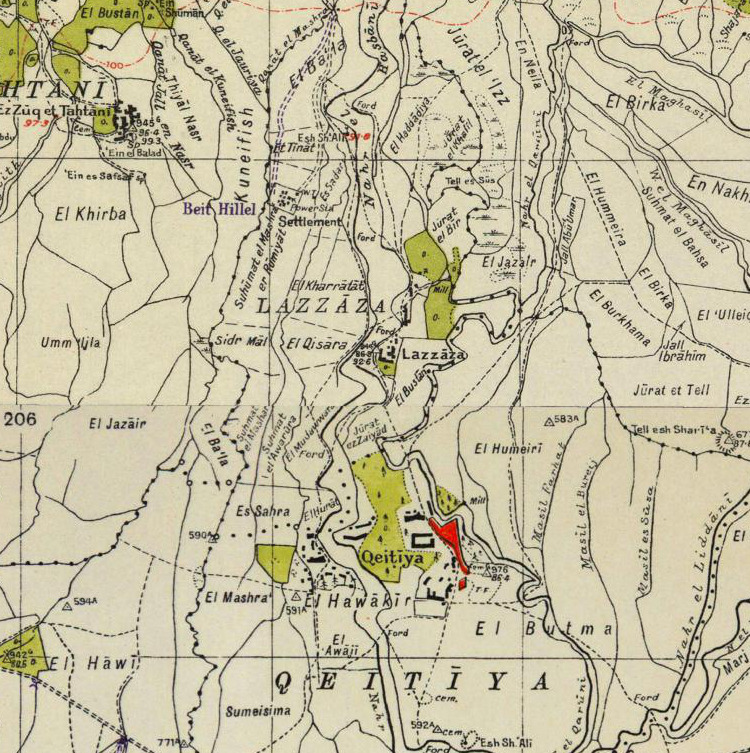
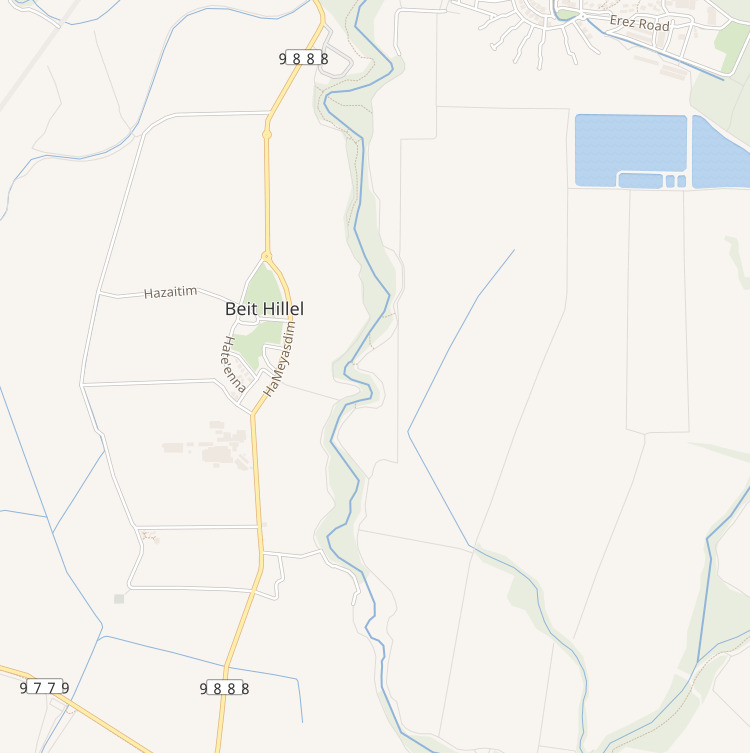
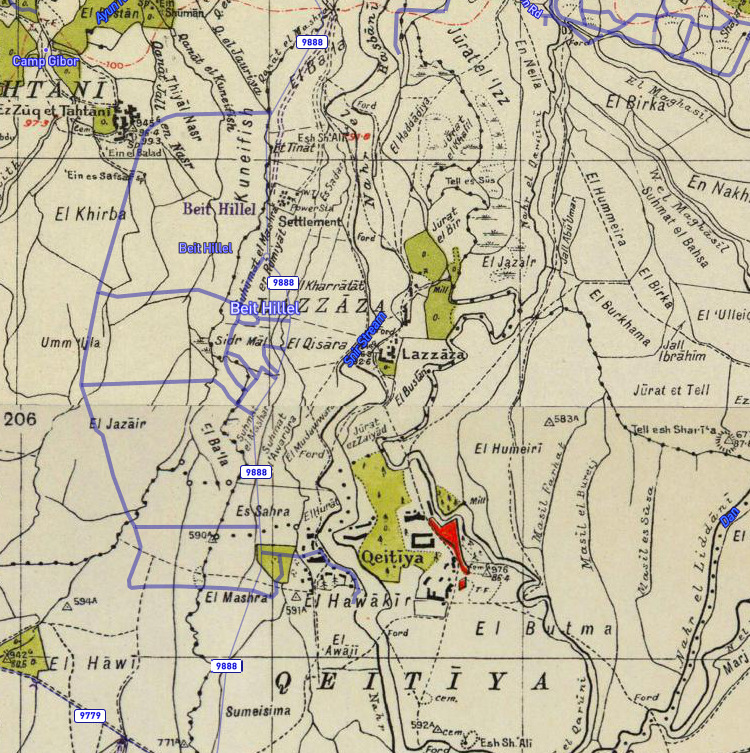
- 1870s map 1940s map modern map 1940s with modern overlay map A series of historical maps of the area around Lazzaza (click the buttons)

- Location within Mandatory Palestine
- Coordinates: 33°12′21″N 35°36′42″E
- Palestine grid: 207/290
- Geopolitical entity: Mandatory Palestine
- Subdistrict: Safad
- Date of depopulation: May 21, 1948

Area
  - Total: 1,586 dunams (1.586 km^{2}; 0.612 sq mi)

Population (1945)
  - Total: 230
- Cause(s) of depopulation: Whispering campaign
- Current Localities: Beit Hillel.

Lazzaza (Arabic: لزّازة, transliterated as Lazzâza) was a Palestinian Arab village of 230 in the northern Hula Valley next to the Hasbani River, located 27.5 kilometers (17.1 mi) northwest of Safad. Beit Hillel subsequently expanded onto the land.

== History ==
In 1881, the PEF's Survey of Western Palestine (SWP) described Lazzaza, while under Ottoman rule, as a village of 70 people built of adobe bricks and situated on a plain near a river.

=== British Mandate era ===
It was incorporated into the British Mandate of Palestine in 1922. Under the British, Lazzaza had an elementary school, in which 26 students were enrolled in 1945. The residents, mostly Muslims, took advantage of the village's fertile lands, and agriculture became the basis of its economy. The primarily cultivated crops were onions, corn, and fruits, but the beehives were also kept, in addition to some livestock. Some of Lazzaza's inhabitants also fished in the Hasbani River.

In the 1931 census of Palestine the population of Lazaza was 176, all Muslims, in a total of 39 houses.

In the 1945 statistics, Lazzaza was counted with the nearby Jewish settlement of Beit Hillel which together constituted a population of 330; 230 were Muslims of Lazzaza, the remaining 100 were Jewish of Beit Hillel.

Types of land use in dunams in the village in 1945:

Land Usage	Arab	Jewish
Irrigated and plantation	235	805
Cereal	95	119
Cultivable	330	924
Urban	27	18
Non-cultivable	20	0

The land ownership of the village before occupation in dunams:

Owner	Dunams
Arab	377
Jewish	942
Public	267
Total	1,586

=== 1948, aftermath ===
The Arabs of Lazzaza fled their village during the 1948 Arab-Israeli War on May 21, 1948. The village was not attacked by Israeli forces, and the probable cause of its depopulation was a "whispering campaign" devised by Palmach commander Yigal Allon during Operation Yiftach, in which rumor would spread about massive Jewish reinforcements approaching the Galilee. According to Walid Khalidi, "only a few scattered houses remain on the village site", and that the residents of Beit Hillel cultivate the surrounding fields.

== See also ==
- Depopulated Palestinian locations in Israel

== Bibliography ==
- Conder, C.R.; Kitchener, H.H. (1881). The Survey of Western Palestine: Memoirs of the Topography, Orography, Hydrography, and Archaeology. Vol. 1. London: Committee of the Palestine Exploration Fund.
- Department of Statistics (1945). Village Statistics, April, 1945. Government of Palestine.
- Hadawi, S. (1970). Village Statistics of 1945: A Classification of Land and Area ownership in Palestine. Palestine Liberation Organization Research Centre.
- Khalidi, W. (1992). All That Remains:The Palestinian Villages Occupied and Depopulated by Israel in 1948. Washington D.C.: Institute for Palestine Studies. ISBN 0-88728-224-5. *Mills, E., ed. (1932). Census of Palestine 1931. Population of Villages, Towns and Administrative Areas. Jerusalem: Government of Palestine.
- Mills, E., ed. (1932). Census of Palestine 1931. Population of Villages, Towns and Administrative Areas. Jerusalem: Government of Palestine.
- Morris, B. (2004). The Birth of the Palestinian Refugee Problem Revisited. Cambridge University Press. ISBN 978-0-521-00967-6.
- Palmer, E.H. (1881). The Survey of Western Palestine: Arabic and English Name Lists Collected During the Survey by Lieutenants Conder and Kitchener, R. E. Transliterated and Explained by E.H. Palmer. Committee of the Palestine Exploration Fund.
