= Al-Manshiyya, Safad =

Al-Manshiyya المنشية
- Village
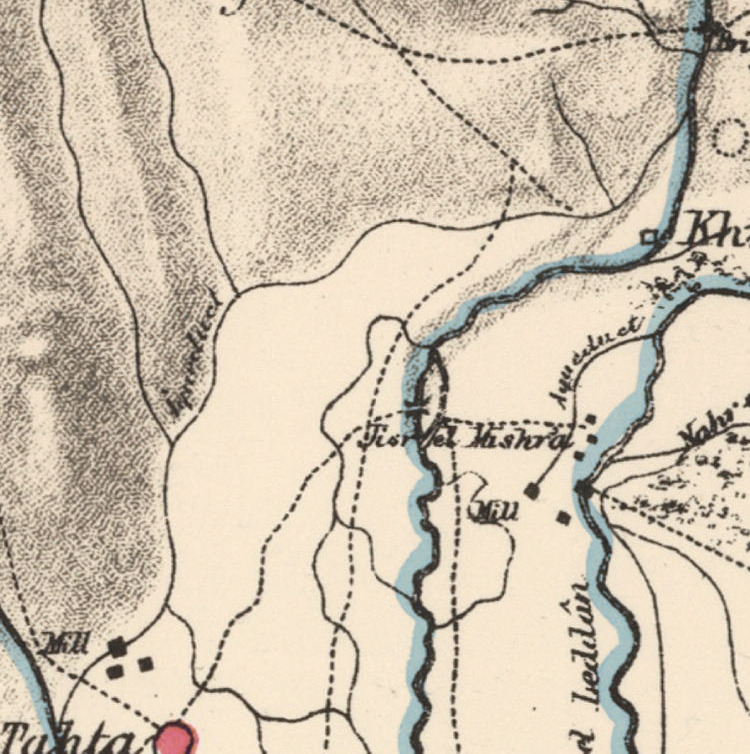
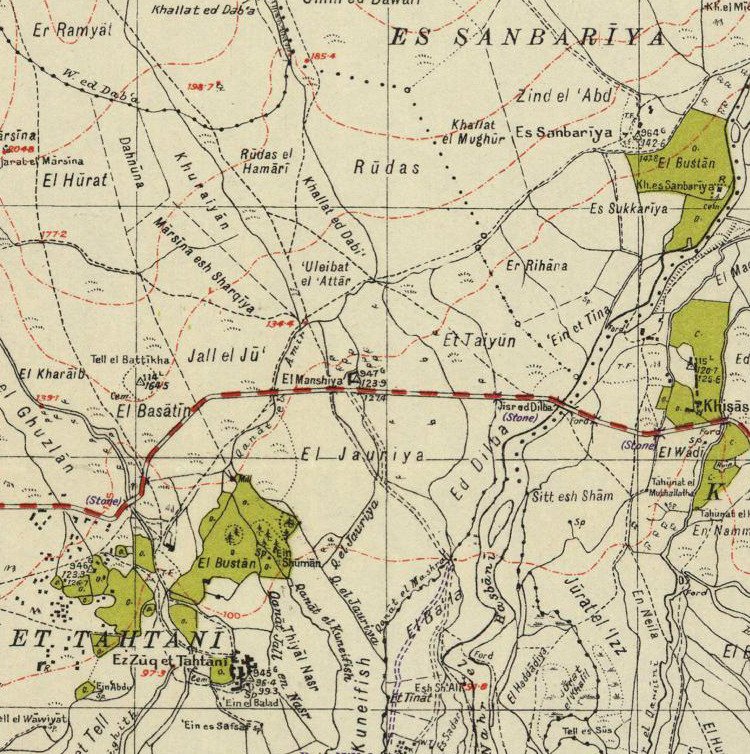
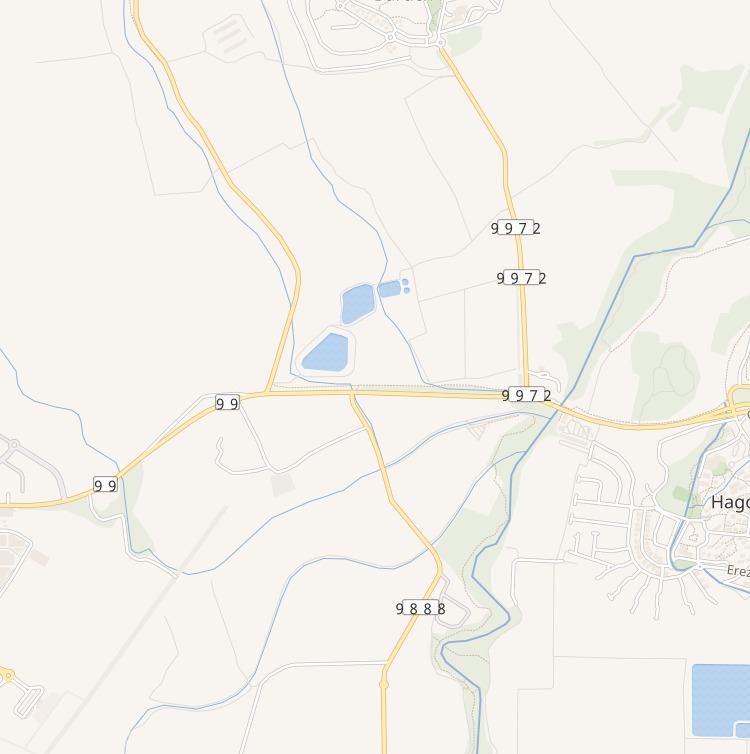
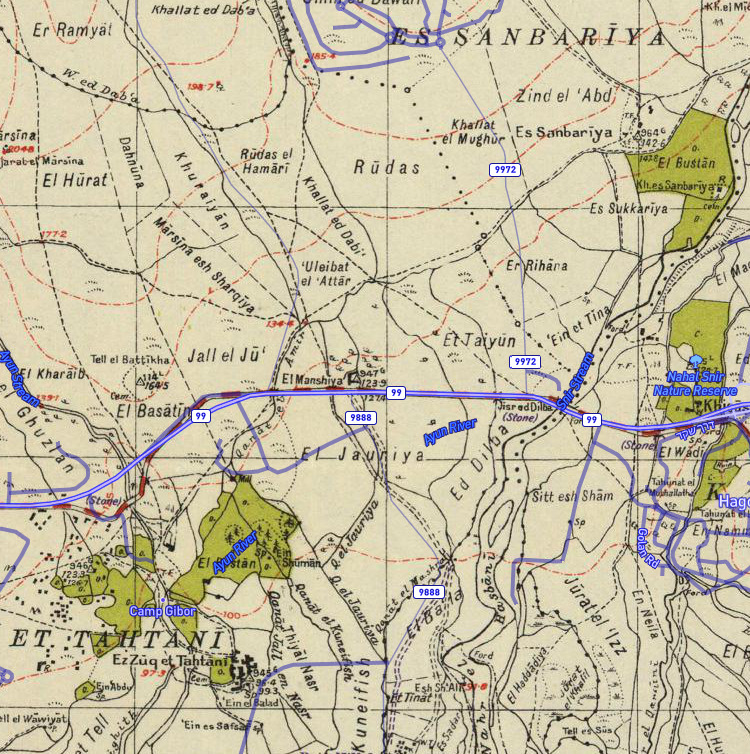
- 1870s map 1940s map modern map 1940s with modern overlay map A series of historical maps of the area around Al-Manshiyya, Safad (click the buttons)

- Location within Mandatory Palestine
- Coordinates: 33°13′32″N 35°36′24″E
- Palestine grid: 206/292
- Geopolitical entity: Mandatory Palestine
- Subdistrict: Safad
- Date of depopulation: Not known

Population (1948)
  - Total: 140

Al-Manshiyya (Arabic: المنشية) was a Palestinian Arab village in the Safad Subdistrict (located 30 km northeast of Safad) that was depopulated by the Palmach's First Battalion of Operation Yiftach during the 1948 War on May 24, 1948.

Al-Manshīyya was a modern agricultural estate belonging to Emir Fāʿūr, sheikh of the Faḍl tribal confederacy in the Golan, cultivated by local Ghawārina Marsh Arabs and settled fellahin.

In discussing the Diocletianic boundary-stone toponym Mamsia, Marom argues that the British Mandate–period estate name al-Manšīya likely reflects a later folk-etymological reshaping of an older form, mediated through the adjacent microtoponym Marsīna al-Šarqiya (c. 400 m to the northwest).

In 1948 it had a population of 140. 1948 was also the year the village was destroyed and depopulated. It is now mainly deserted with multiple abandoned buildings.

== Bibliography ==
- Khalidi, W. (1992). All That Remains: The Palestinian Villages Occupied and Depopulated by Israel in 1948. Washington D.C.: Institute for Palestine Studies. ISBN 0-88728-224-5.
- Mills, E., ed. (1932). Census of Palestine 1931. Population of Villages, Towns and Administrative Areas. Jerusalem: Government of Palestine.
- Morris, B. (2004). The Birth of the Palestinian Refugee Problem Revisited. Cambridge University Press. ISBN 978-0-521-00967-6.
