= Qaytiyya =

Qaytiyya Qeitiya
- Village
- Etymology: El Keitîyeh, el Keitîyeh, from personal name
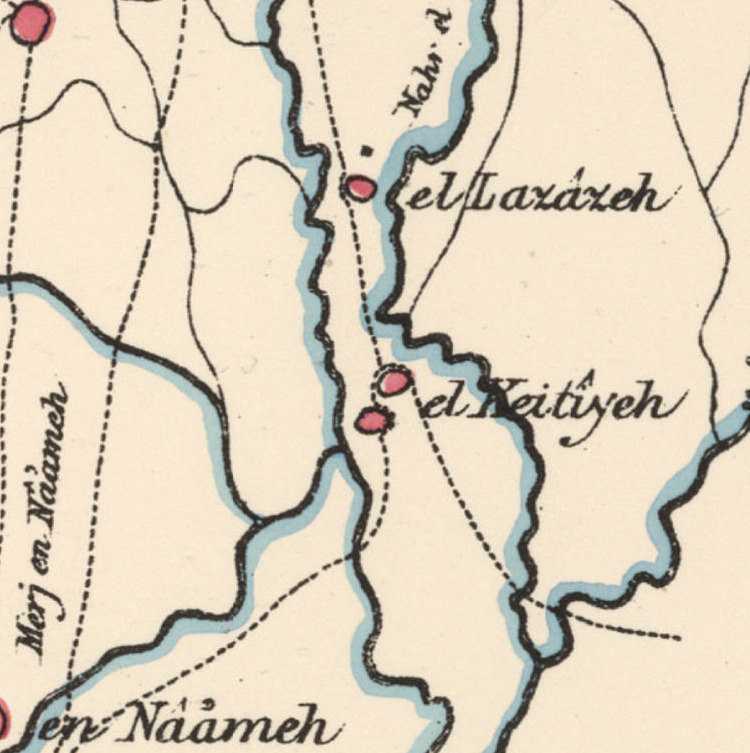
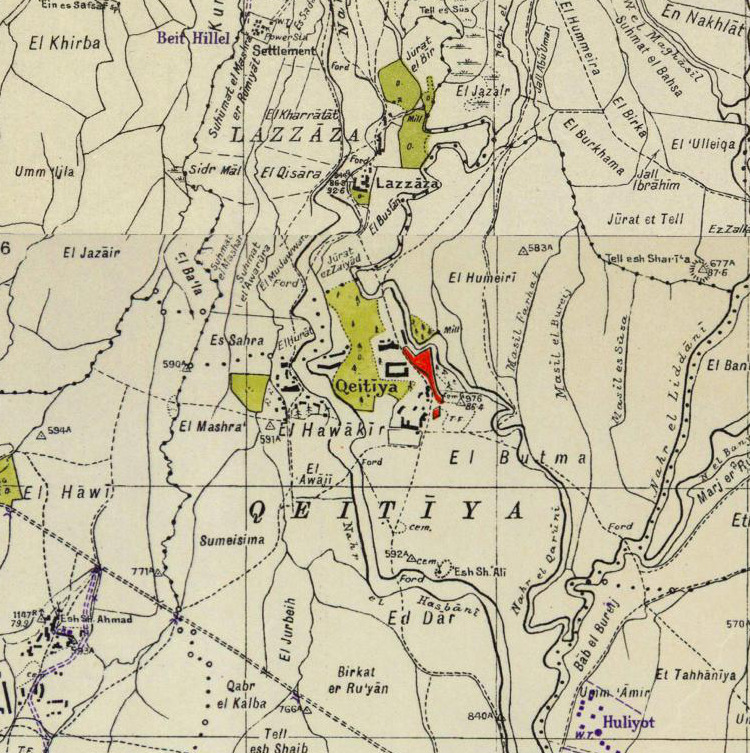
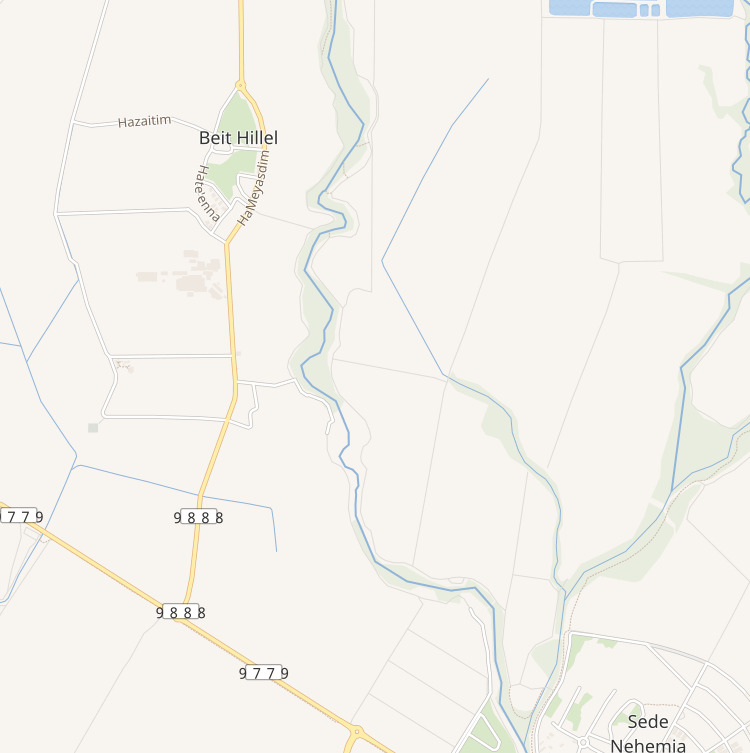
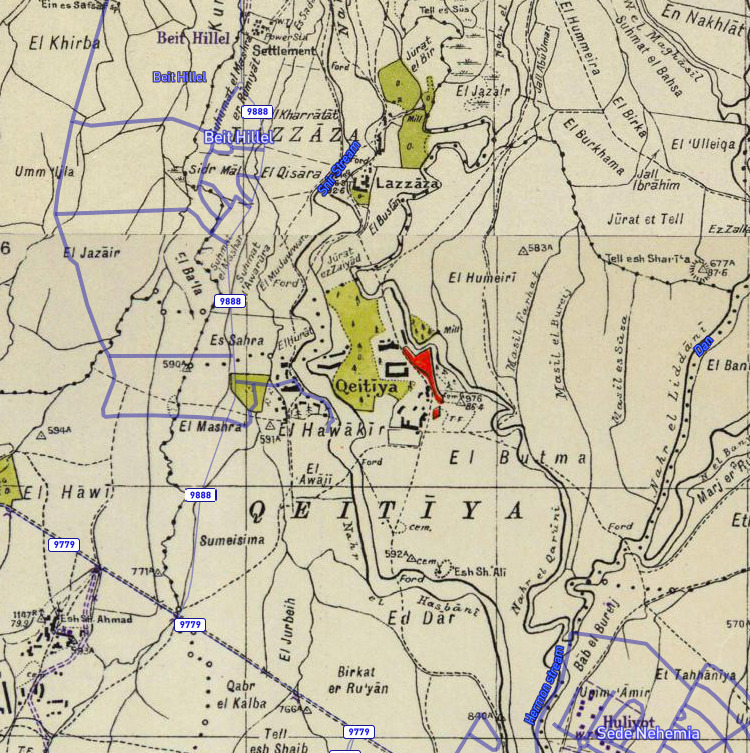
- 1870s map 1940s map modern map 1940s with modern overlay map A series of historical maps of the area around Qaytiyya (click the buttons)

- Location within Mandatory Palestine
- Coordinates: 33°11′59″N 35°36′46″E
- Palestine grid: 207/289
- Geopolitical entity: Mandatory Palestine
- Subdistrict: Safad
- Date of depopulation: May 19, 1948/June 1948

Population (1945)
  - Total: 940
- Cause(s) of depopulation: Whispering campaign
- Secondary cause: Expulsion by Yishuv forces
- Current Localities: Kfar Blum, possibly Beit Hillel

Qaytiyya was a Palestinian Arab village in the Safad Subdistrict. It was depopulated during the 1948 War on May 19, 1948, by the Palmach's First Battalion of Operation Yiftach. It was located 28 km northeast of Safad, bordering both the Hasibani and the Dan Rivers.

== History ==
In 1881, the PEF's Survey of Western Palestine (SWP) described El Keitîyeh, while under Ottoman rule, as a village of 80 Muslims built of adobe and surrounded by streams: occupied during spring and harvest. bordering both the Hasibani and the Dan Rivers.

=== British Mandate era ===
In the 1931 census of Palestine, under of the British Mandate in Palestine, Qeitiya had a population of 824 Muslims, in a total of 163 houses.

In the 1945 statistics, Qeitiya had a population of 940 Muslims, and the total land area was 5,390 dunums. Of this, 19 dunums were for citrus and bananas, 4,465 for plantations and irrigable land, 44 for cereals, while 93 dunams were built-up (urban) land.

=== 1992, aftermath ===
In 1992 the village site was described: "Only a few stones from the old village are still visible. The surrounding land is cultivated, except for a small section that contains stone rubble and is overgrown with thorny plants and eucalyptus trees."

== Bibliography ==
- Conder, C.R.; Kitchener, H.H. (1881). The Survey of Western Palestine: Memoirs of the Topography, Orography, Hydrography, and Archaeology. Vol. 1. London: Committee of the Palestine Exploration Fund.
- Department of Statistics (1945). Village Statistics, April, 1945. Government of Palestine.
- Hadawi, S. (1970). Village Statistics of 1945: A Classification of Land and Area ownership in Palestine. Palestine Liberation Organization Research Center.
- Khalidi, W. (1992). All That Remains: The Palestinian Villages Occupied and Depopulated by Israel in 1948. Washington D.C.: Institute for Palestine Studies. ISBN 0-88728-224-5.
- Mills, E., ed. (1932). Census of Palestine 1931. Population of Villages, Towns and Administrative Areas. Jerusalem: Government of Palestine.
- Morris, B. (2004). The Birth of the Palestinian Refugee Problem Revisited. Cambridge University Press. ISBN 978-0-521-00967-6.(Morris, 2004, pp. 251, 511 - 512, 539)
- Palmer, E.H. (1881). The Survey of Western Palestine: Arabic and English Name Lists Collected During the Survey by Lieutenants Conder and Kitchener, R. E. Transliterated and Explained by E.H. Palmer. Committee of the Palestine Exploration Fund.
