= Al-Buwayziyya =

Al-Buwayziyya البويزية والميس Buweiziya,
- Village
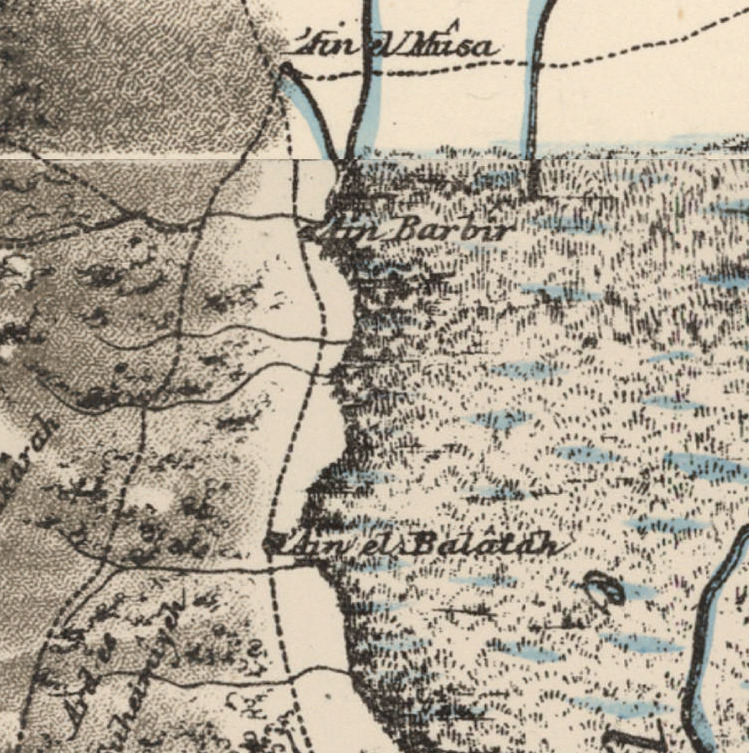
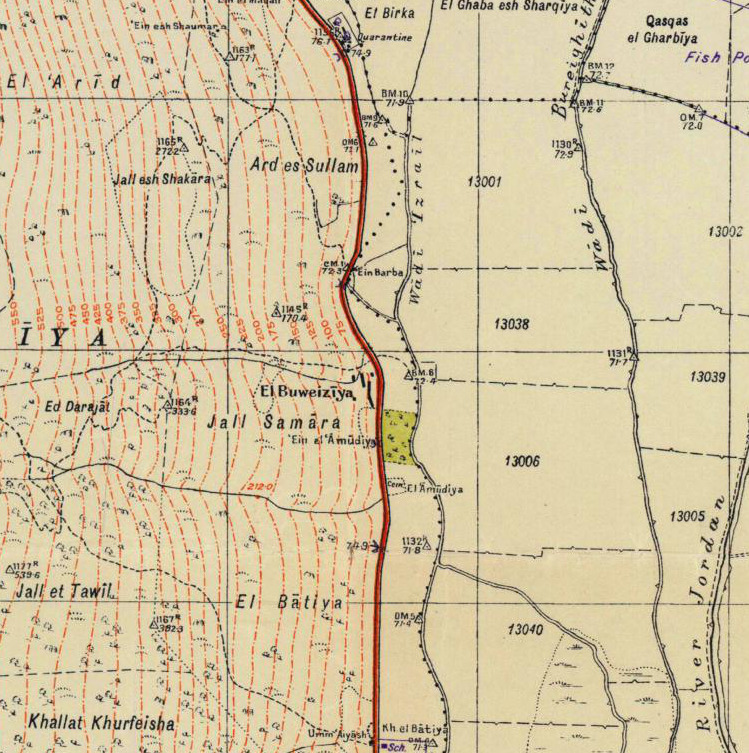
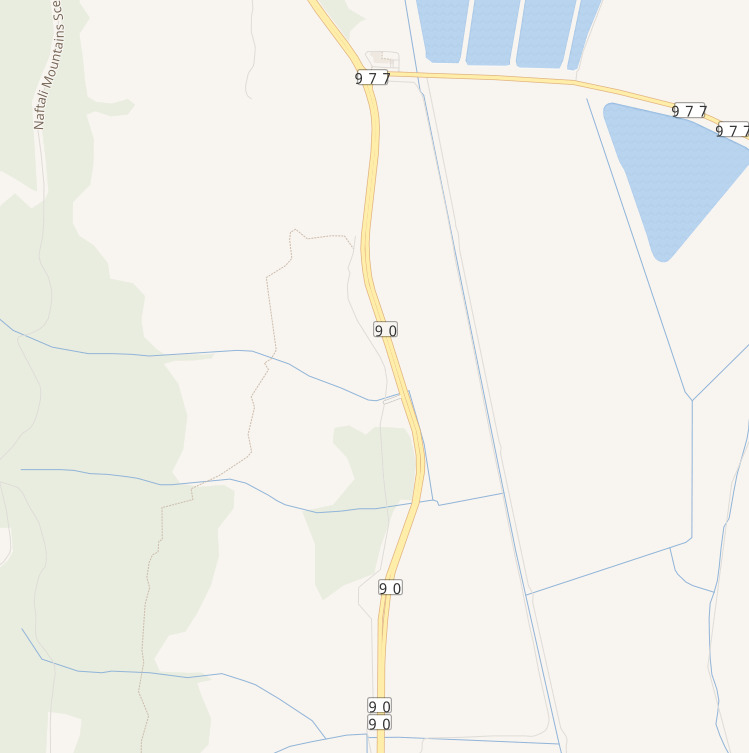
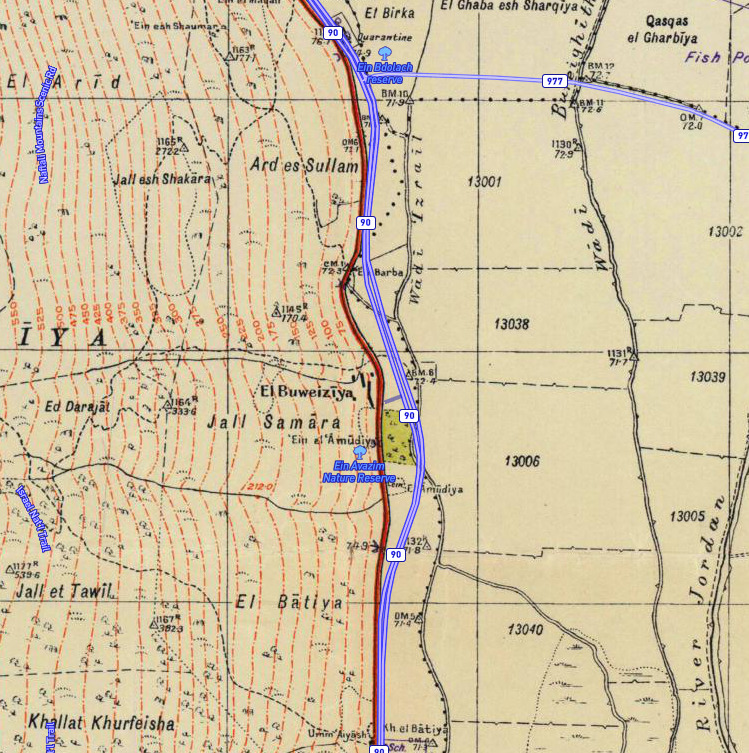
- 1870s map 1940s map modern map 1940s with modern overlay map A series of historical maps of the area around Al-Buwayziyya (click the buttons)

- Location within Mandatory Palestine
- Coordinates: 33°09′32″N 35°34′13″E
- Palestine grid: 203/284
- Geopolitical entity: Mandatory Palestine
- Subdistrict: Safad
- Date of depopulation: May 11, 1948

Area
  - Total: 14,620 dunams (14.62 km^{2}; 5.64 sq mi)

Population (1945)
  - Total: 510
- Cause(s) of depopulation: Influence of nearby town's fall

Al-Buwayziyya (Arabic: البويزية والميس) was a Palestinian Arab village in the Safad Subdistrict. It was depopulated during the 1947–1948 Civil War in Mandatory Palestine on May 11, 1948, by the Palmach's First Battalion of Operation Yiftach. It was located 22 km northeast of Safad.

In the 1944/45 statistics it had a population 510 Muslims. The village had elementary school for boys which was founded in 1937.

== History ==
=== British Mandate era ===
In the 1922 census of Palestine conducted by the British Mandate authorities, Buaizia had a population of 276, all Muslims, increasing in the 1931 census to 318, still all Muslims, in a total of 75 houses.

The population were mostly engaged in agriculture and mainly grew citrus fruits, grains and vegetables. In 1944/45 it had a total of 14,620 dunum of land, of which 2,770 dunums was allocated to cereal farming, 56 dunums was used for irrigation and orchards, while 17 dunams were classified as urban (built-up) land.

=== 1948, aftermath ===
The village was attacked by Israeli forces on 11 May 1948 as part of Operation Yiftach which depopulated eastern Galilee. According to Israeli historian Benny Morris, al-Buwayziyya’s residents fled when they learned that the neighboring village of al-Khalisa, 5 km to the north, had succumbed to Jewish forces and as a result the village had been evacuated after the Haganah declined the villagers’ request for conditional permission to stay.

In 1992, the village site was described: "On the site where al-Buwayziyya once stood are remains of destroyed houses, a few walls and terraces, and the (intact) concrete roof of one house. The flat portion of the surrounding lands are used by Israelis for agriculture; the more hilly lands serve as pasture."

== Bibliography ==
- Barron, J.B., ed. (1923). Palestine: Report and General Abstracts of the Census of 1922. Government of Palestine.
- Department of Statistics (1945). Village Statistics, April, 1945. Government of Palestine.
- Hadawi, S. (1970). Village Statistics of 1945: A Classification of Land and Area ownership in Palestine. Palestine Liberation Organization Research Center. Archived from the original on 2018-12-08.
- Khalidi, W. (1992). All That Remains: The Palestinian Villages Occupied and Depopulated by Israel in 1948. Washington D.C.: Institute for Palestine Studies. ISBN 0-88728-224-5.
- Mills, E., ed. (1932). Census of Palestine 1931. Population of Villages, Towns and Administrative Areas. Jerusalem: Government of Palestine.
- Morris, B. (2004). The Birth of the Palestinian Refugee Problem Revisited. Cambridge University Press. ISBN 978-0-521-00967-6.
