= Al-Muftakhira =

- Village
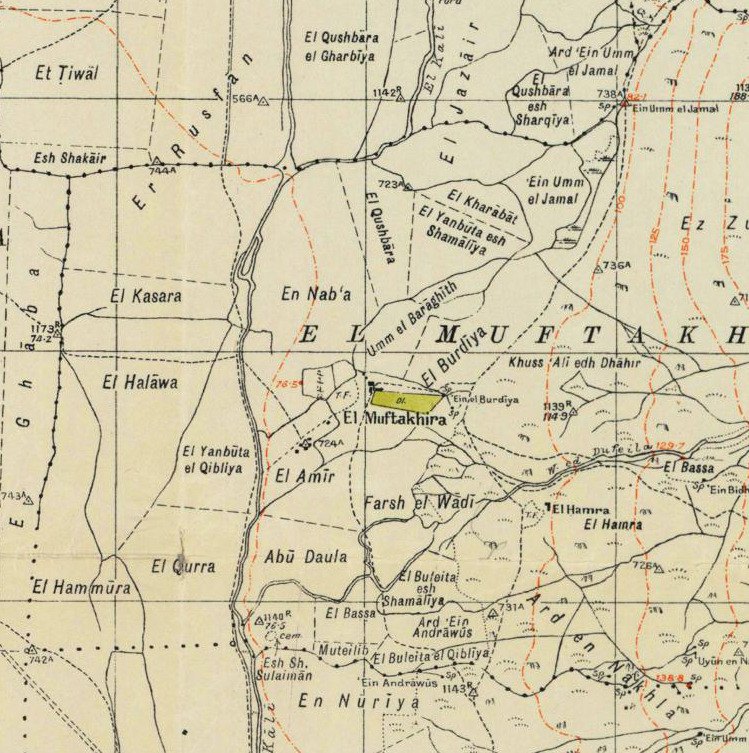
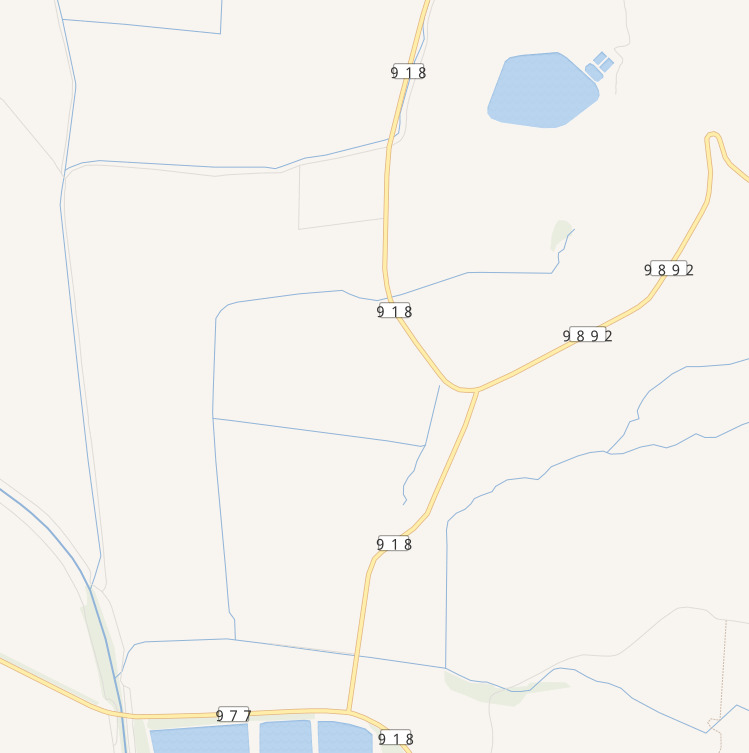
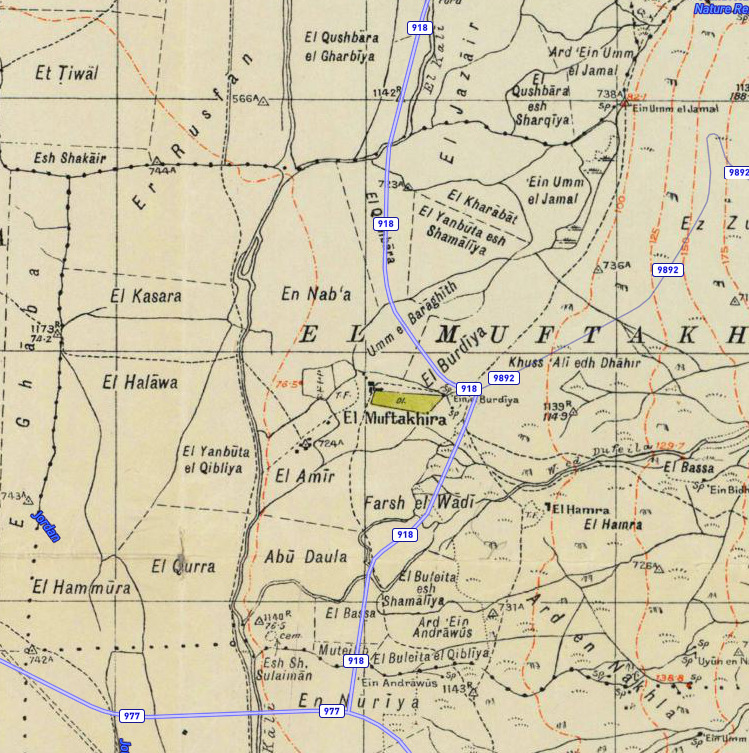
- 1940s map modern map 1940s with modern overlay map A series of historical maps of the area around Al-Muftakhira (click the buttons)

- Location within Mandatory Palestine
- Coordinates: 33°09′31″N 35°38′23″E
- Palestine grid: 209/284
- Geopolitical entity: Mandatory Palestine
- Subdistrict: Safad
- Date of depopulation: May 16, 1948

Population (1945)
  - Total: 350
- Cause(s) of depopulation: Fear of being caught up in the fighting
- Current Localities: Shamir, Israel

Al-Muftakhira was a Palestinian Arab village in the Safad Subdistrict. It was depopulated in the 1948 War on May 16, 1948, by the Palmach's First Battalion during Operation Yiftach. It was located 25.5 km northeast of Safad.

In the 1945 statistics it had a population of 350.

== Bibliography ==
- Department of Statistics (1945). Village Statistics, April, 1945. Government of Palestine.
- Hadawi, S. (1970). Village Statistics of 1945: A Classification of Land and Area ownership in Palestine. Palestine Liberation Organization Research Center. Archived from the original on 2018-12-08.
- Khalidi, W. (1992). All That Remains:The Palestinian Villages Occupied and Depopulated by Israel in 1948. Washington D.C.: Institute for Palestine Studies. ISBN 0-88728-224-5.
- Mills, E., ed. (1932). Census of Palestine 1931. Population of Villages, Towns and Administrative Areas. Jerusalem: Government of Palestine.
- Morris, B. (2004). The Birth of the Palestinian Refugee Problem Revisited. Cambridge University Press. ISBN 978-0-521-00967-6.
