= Zawiya, Safad =

Al-Zawiya الزوِية
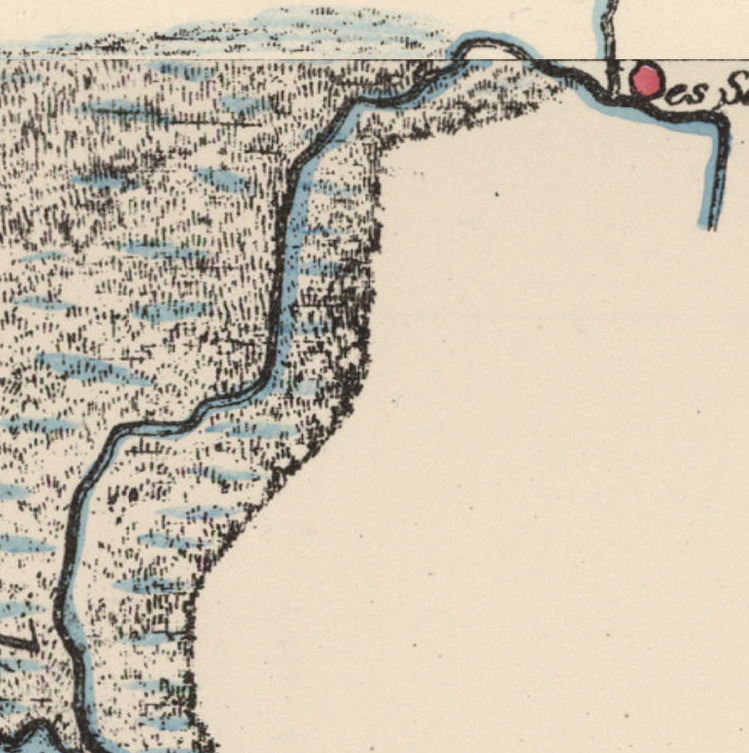
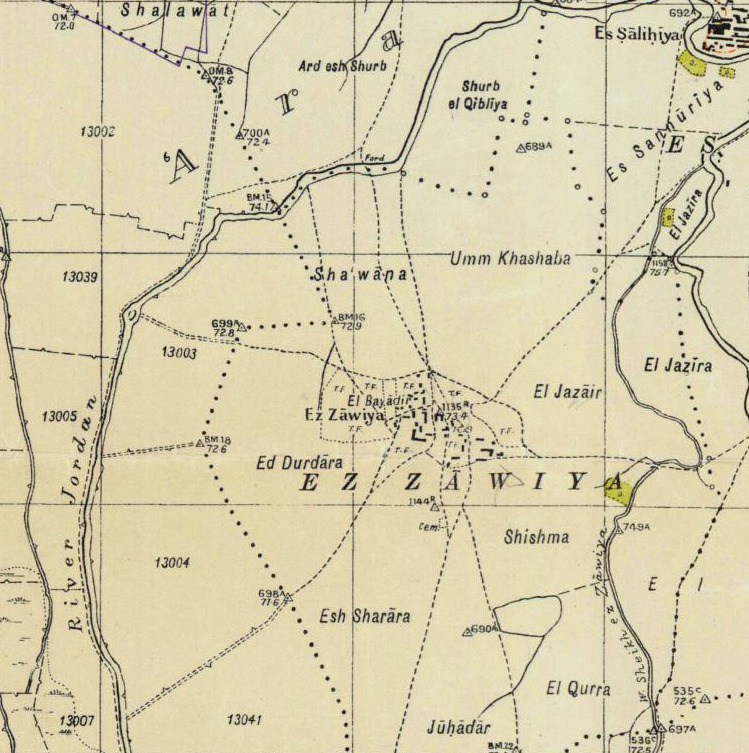
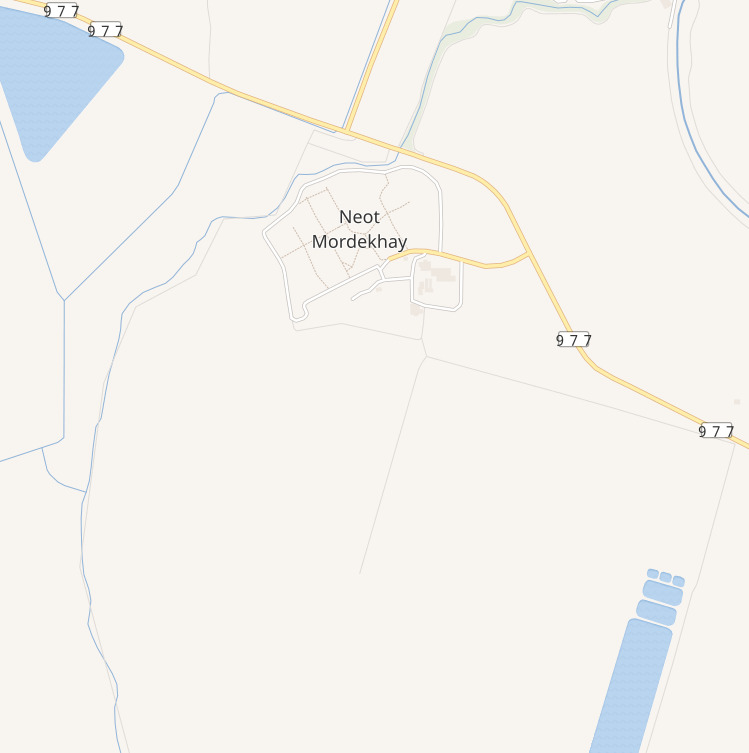
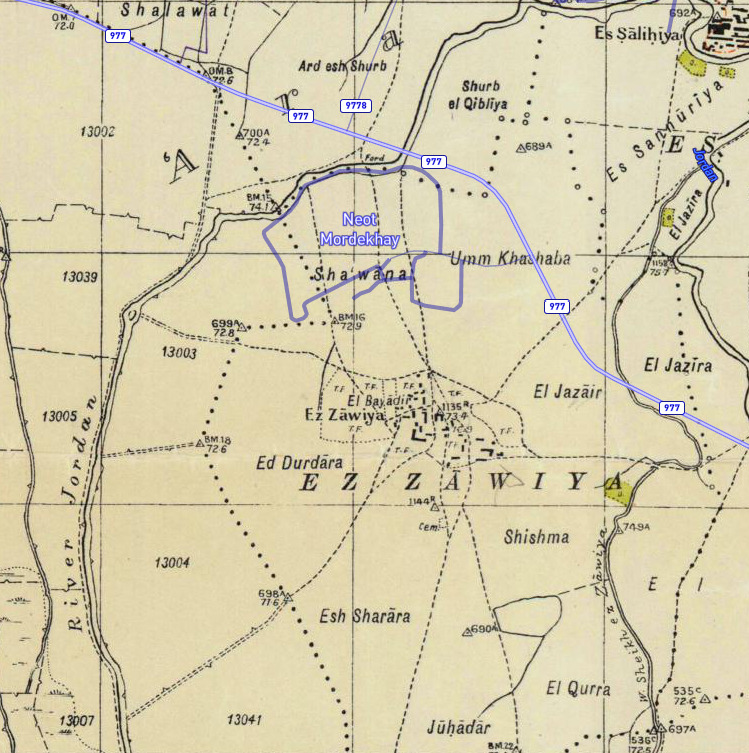
- 1870s map 1940s map modern map 1940s with modern overlay map A series of historical maps of the area around Zawiya, Safad (click the buttons)

- Location within Mandatory Palestine
- Coordinates: 33°09′19″N 35°35′50″E
- Palestine grid: 206/284
- Geopolitical entity: Mandatory Palestine
- Subdistrict: Safad
- Date of depopulation: May 24, 1948

Area
  - Total: 3,958 dunams (3.958 km^{2}; 1.528 sq mi)

Population (1945)
  - Total: 760
- Cause(s) of depopulation: Military assault by Yishuv forces
- Secondary cause: Expulsion by Yishuv forces
- Current Localities: Neot Mordechai

Al-Zawiya was a Palestinian Arab village in the Safad Subdistrict. It was depopulated during the 1947–1948 Civil War in Mandatory Palestine on May 24, 1948, by the Palmach's First Battalion of Operation Yiftach. It was located 23 km northeast of Safad.

== History ==
In the 1931 census of Palestine, conducted by the British Mandate authorities, Ez Zawiya had a population of 590 Muslims, in a total of 141 houses.

In the 1945 statistics, the village had a population of 760. with a total of 3,958 dunams of land (1 dunam=1000 square meters), according to an official land and population survey. Of this, 3,593 dunums were used for cereals; while a 195 dunams were classified as built-up, urban areas.

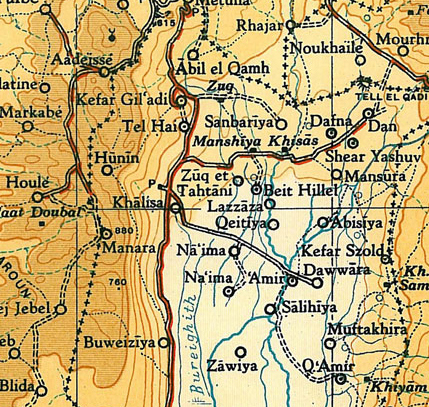
Zawiya, 1946

=== 1948, aftermath ===
Zawiya became depopulated on May 24, 1948, after expulsion by the Zionist forces.

== Bibliography ==
- Department of Statistics (1945). Village Statistics, April, 1945. Government of Palestine.
- Hadawi, S. (1970). Village Statistics of 1945: A Classification of Land and Area ownership in Palestine. Palestine Liberation Organization Research Center.
- Khalidi, W. (1992). All That Remains: The Palestinian Villages Occupied and Depopulated by Israel in 1948. Washington D.C.: Institute for Palestine Studies. ISBN 0-88728-224-5.
- Mills, E., ed. (1932). Census of Palestine 1931. Population of Villages, Towns and Administrative Areas. Jerusalem: Government of Palestine.
- Morris, B. (2004). The Birth of the Palestinian Refugee Problem Revisited. Cambridge University Press. ISBN 978-0-521-00967-6.
