= Al-'Urayfiyya =

Al-'Urayfiyya العريفية
- Village
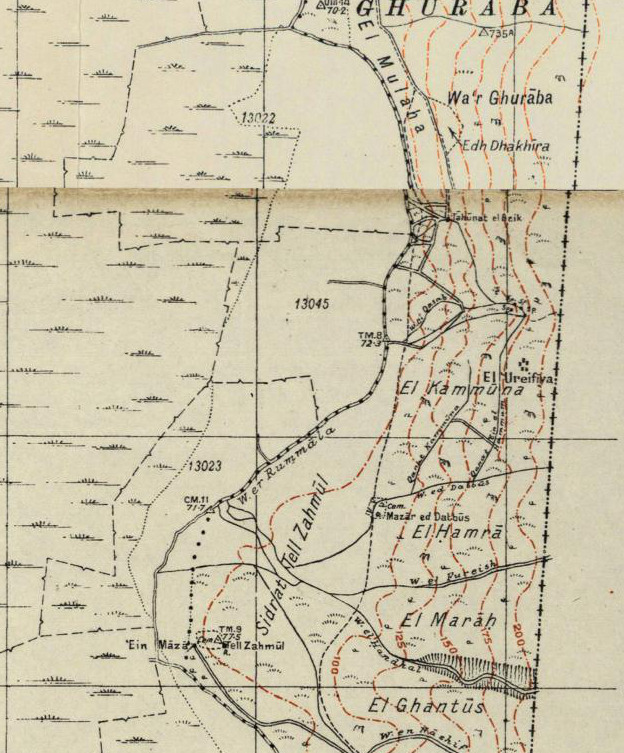
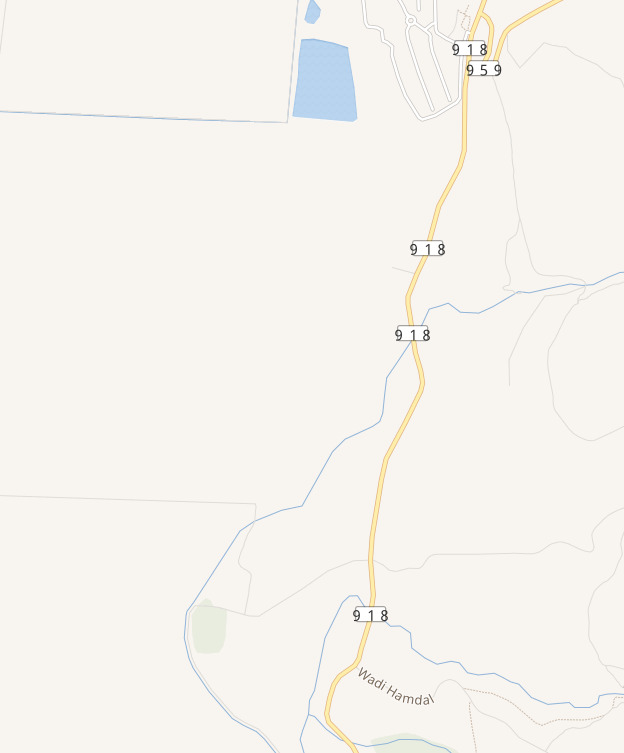
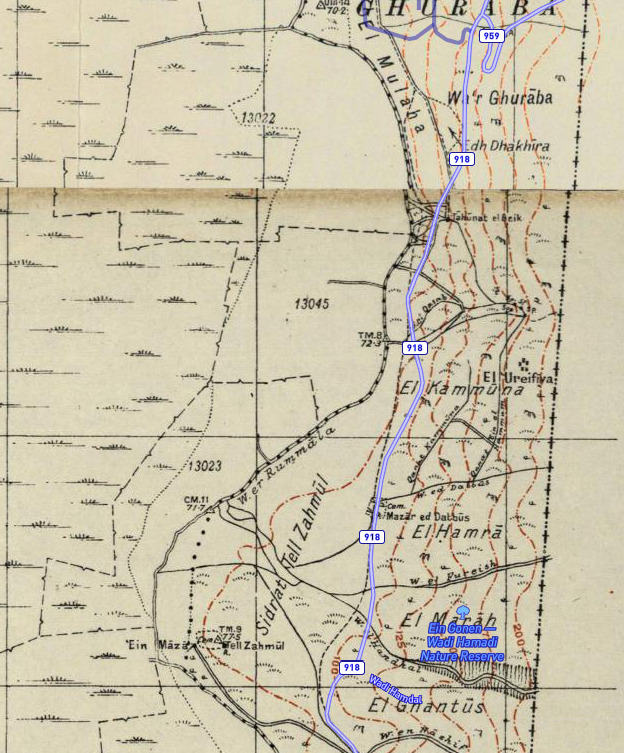
- 1940s map modern map 1940s with modern overlay map A series of historical maps of the area around Al-'Urayfiyya (click the buttons)

- Location within Mandatory Palestine
- Coordinates: 33°06′38″N 35°39′1″E
- Palestine grid: 211/279
- Geopolitical entity: Mandatory Palestine
- Subdistrict: Safad
- Date of depopulation: April 1, 1948

Al-'Urayfiyya was a Palestinian Arab village in the Safad Subdistrict. It was depopulated during the 1947–1948 Civil War in Mandatory Palestine on April 1, 1948, by the Palmach's First Battalion of Operation Yiftach. It was located 21.5 km northeast of Safad. The village has been mostly destroyed with the exception of the remains of a water mill and masonry channel.

== Bibliography ==
- Khalidi, W. (1992). All That Remains: The Palestinian Villages Occupied and Depopulated by Israel in 1948. Washington D.C.: Institute for Palestine Studies. ISBN 0-88728-224-5.
