= Yarda, Safad =

Yarda ياردا
- Village
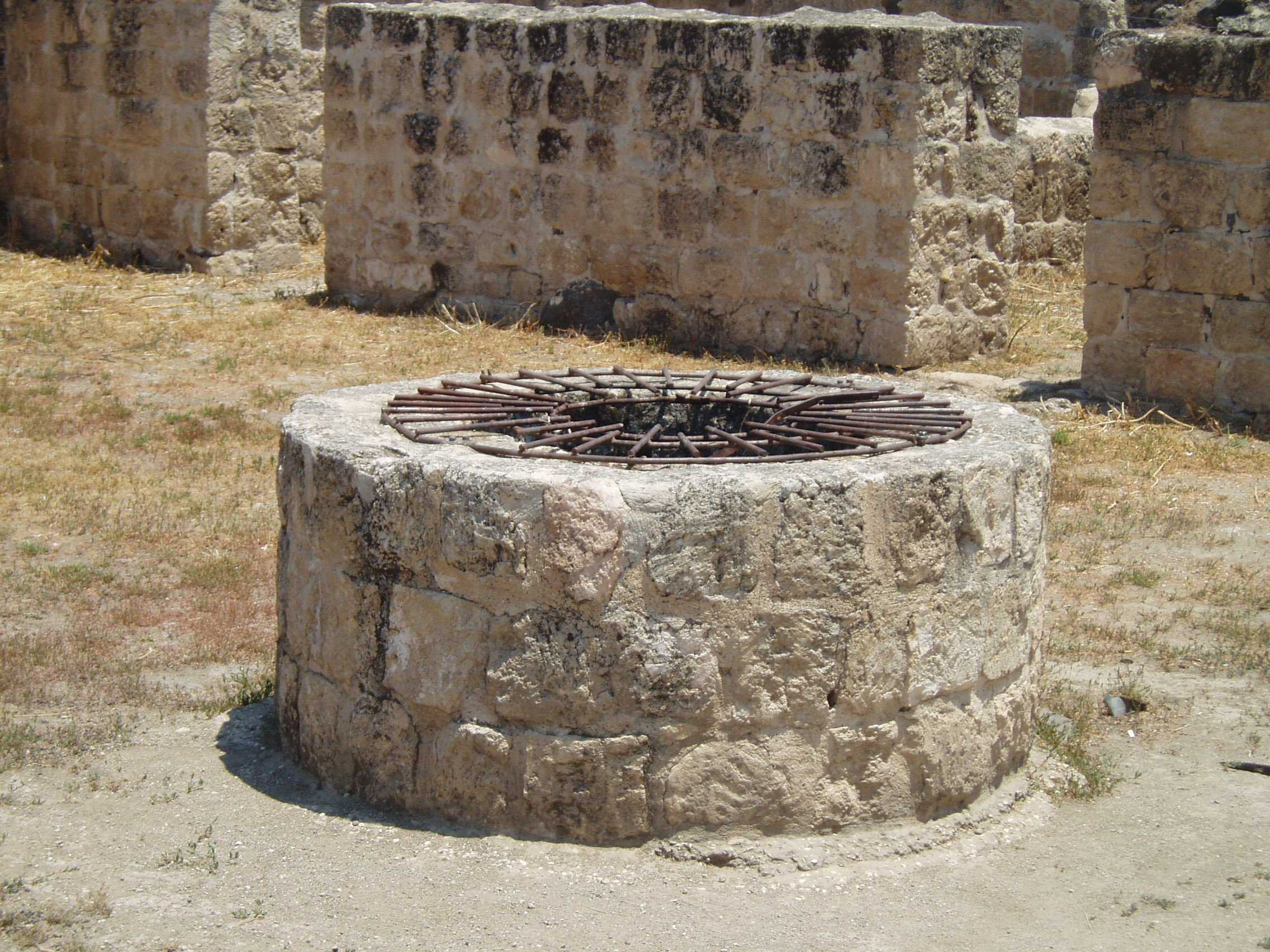
- Well at Yarda
- Etymology: Kh. Wakkâs, the ruin of the man with a broken neck Kh. Lôzîyeh, the ruin of the almond tree
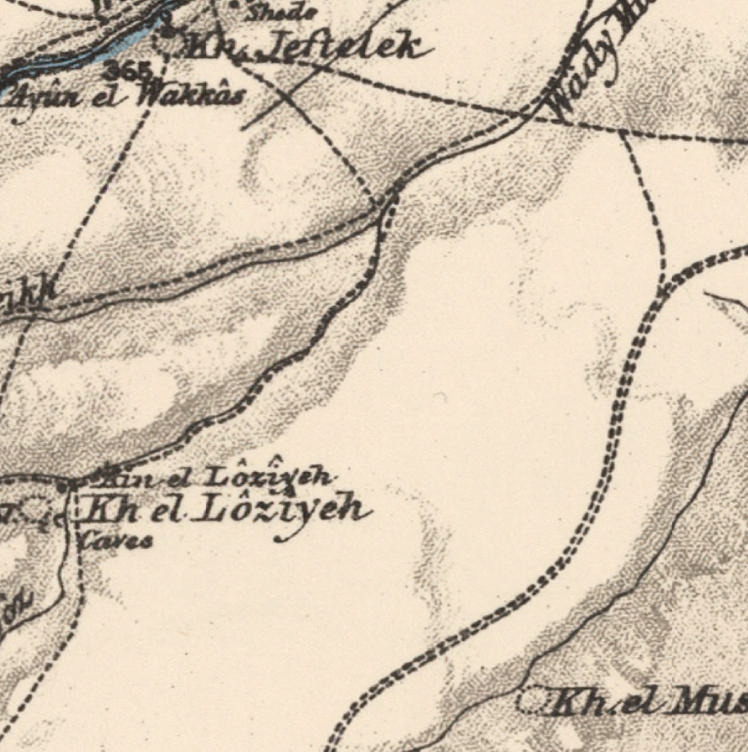
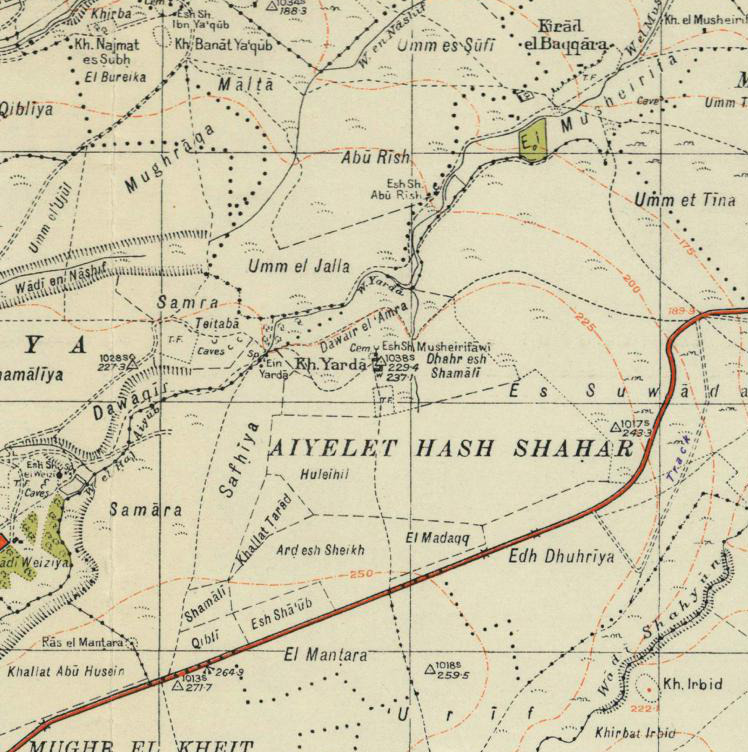
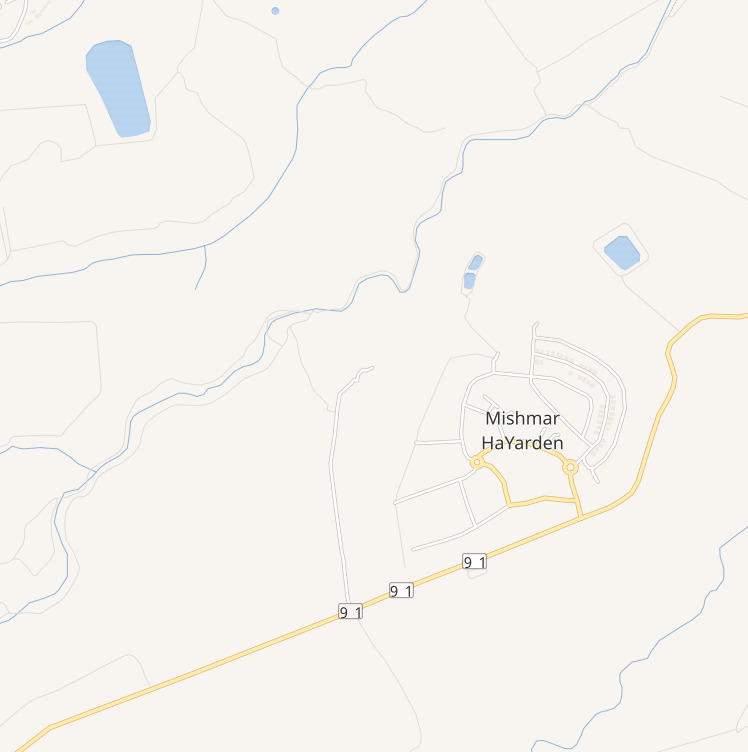
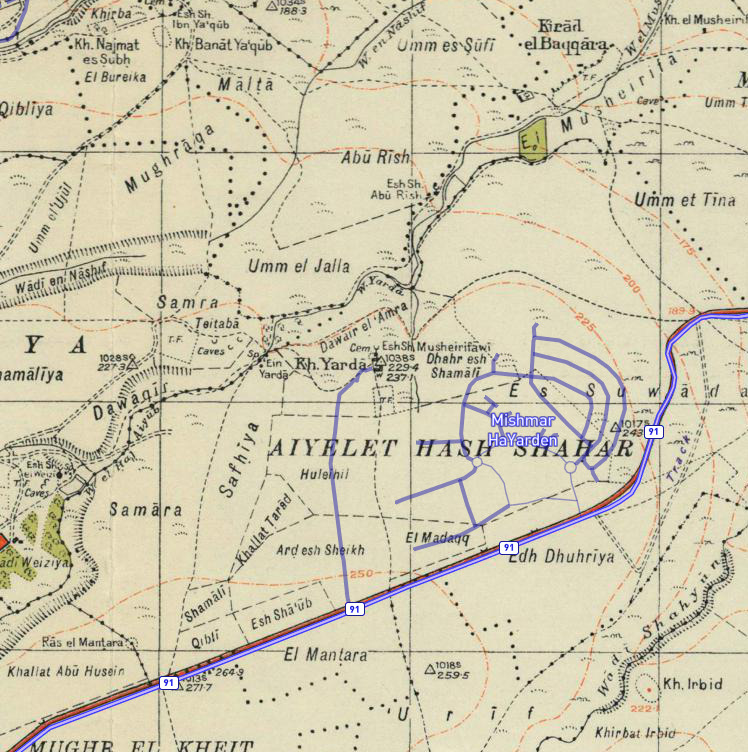
- 1870s map 1940s map modern map 1940s with modern overlay map A series of historical maps of the area around Yarda, Safad (click the buttons)

- Location within Mandatory Palestine
- Coordinates: 33°0′27″N 35°35′38″E
- Palestine grid: 205/268
- Geopolitical entity: Mandatory Palestine
- Subdistrict: Safad

Population (1945)
  - Total: 20
- Current Localities: Ayyelet ha-Shahar and Mishmar ha-Yarden

Yarda was a Palestinian hamlet in the Safad Subdistrict. It was depopulated during the 1947–1949 Palestine war. It was located 10.5 km northeast of Safad. The area is now part of Israel.

== Etymology ==
The name Yarda is Aramaic, and means 'the water spring'.

== History ==
Khirbat Waqqas was located west-northwest of Yarda, and is recognised as the place the Canaanites referred to as Hazor. Victor Guérin found at Kh. Waqqas in 1875: 'Near a small enclosure, in the centre of which is a broken column consecrated to a santon, are shown the remains of an edifice oriented east and west, once probably a church. It was ornamented with monolithic columns in ordinary limestone, some broken pieces of which are still lying about. Other similar fragments are found in the neighbouring houses. Here and there I remarked cut stones, which no doubt belonged to this monument. A little to the south, a hillock is also covered with ruins of houses.' In 1881, the PEF's Survey of Western Palestine (SWP) found at Kh. Wakkas only cattle-sheds.

Yarda itself was located at a place called Kh el Loziyeh in the late Ottoman era. In 1881, the SWP found here: "Caves and ruined cattle sheds".

=== British Mandate era ===
In the 1931 census of Palestine, conducted by the British Mandate authorities, Yarda had a population of 13 Muslims, in a total of 3 houses.

In the 1945 statistics, the population was 20 Muslims, who owned 1,367 dunams of land. Of this, 1,359 dunams were used for cereals, while 8 dunams were classified as un-cultivable area.

=== Post 1948 ===
After Yarda became depopulated, Ayyelet ha-Shahar took over some of the village land, while in 1949 Mishmar ha-Yarden was also settled on village land.

In 1992 the village site was described: "The truncated walls of some houses still stand, as well as those of a khan, or caravansary. The site is strewn with stones from crumbled houses. A portion of the land is used as pasture."

== Bibliography ==
- Conder, C.R.; Kitchener, H.H. (1881). The Survey of Western Palestine: Memoirs of the Topography, Orography, Hydrography, and Archaeology. Vol. 1. London: Committee of the Palestine Exploration Fund.
- Department of Statistics (1945). Village Statistics, April, 1945. Government of Palestine.
- Grootkerk, Salomon E. (2000). Ancient sites in Galilee: a toponymic gazetteer (Illustrated ed.). BRILL. ISBN 978-90-04-11535-4. (p. 122)
- Guérin, V. (1880). Description Géographique Historique et Archéologique de la Palestine (in French). Vol. 3: Galilee, pt. 2. Paris: L'Imprimerie Nationale.
- Hadawi, S. (1970). Village Statistics of 1945: A Classification of Land and Area ownership in Palestine. Palestine Liberation Organization Research Center.
- Khalidi, W. (1992). All That Remains:The Palestinian Villages Occupied and Depopulated by Israel in 1948. Washington D.C.: Institute for Palestine Studies. ISBN 0-88728-224-5.
- Mills, E., ed. (1932). Census of Palestine 1931. Population of Villages, Towns and Administrative Areas. Jerusalem: Government of Palestine.
- Palmer, E.H. (1881). The Survey of Western Palestine: Arabic and English Name Lists Collected During the Survey by Lieutenants Conder and Kitchener, R. E. Transliterated and Explained by E.H. Palmer. Committee of the Palestine Exploration Fund.
