= Khirbat Al-Taqa =

Khirbat Al-Taqa خربة الطاقة
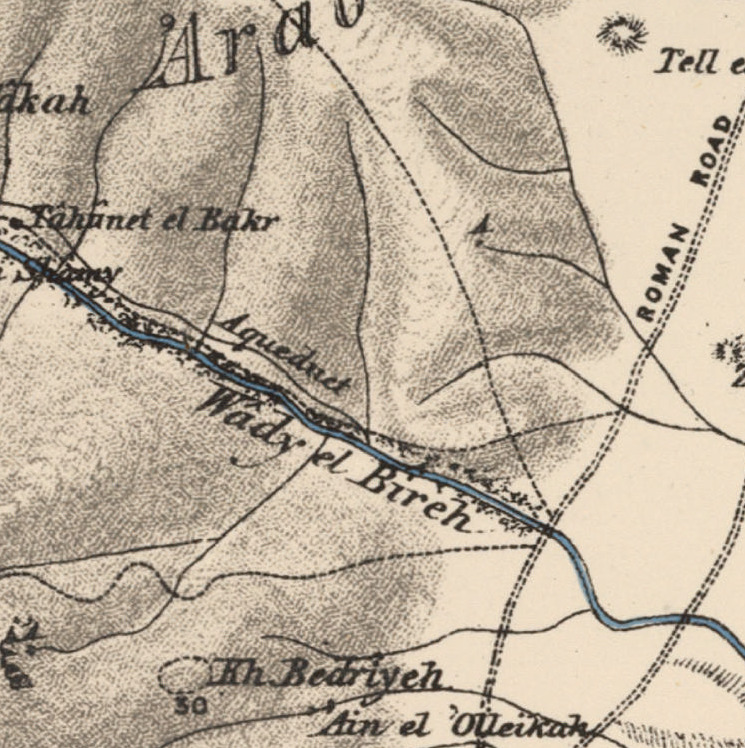
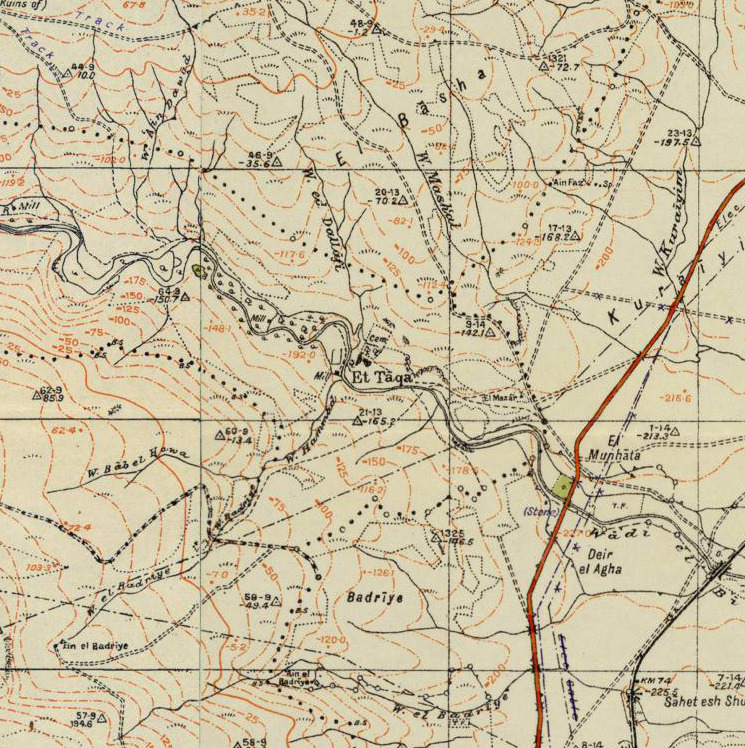
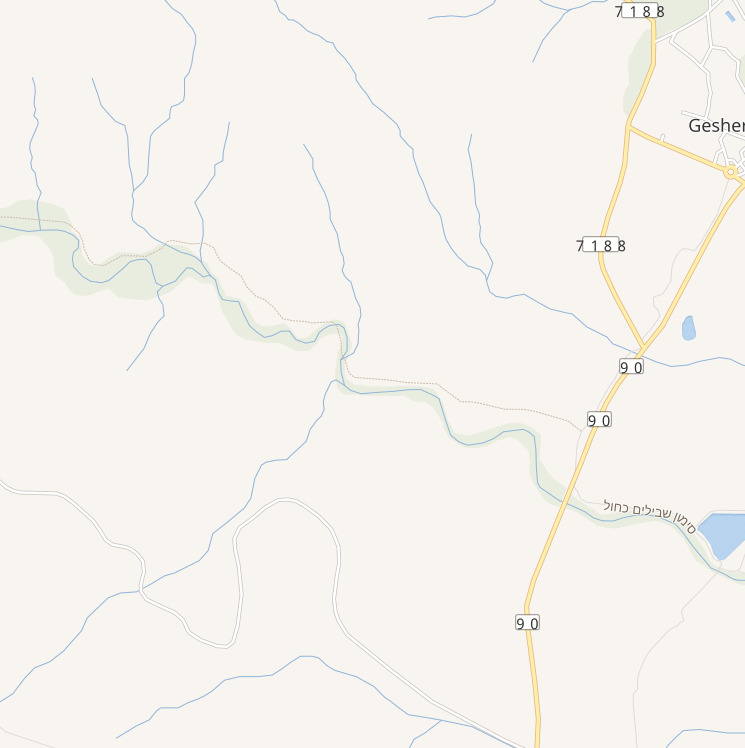
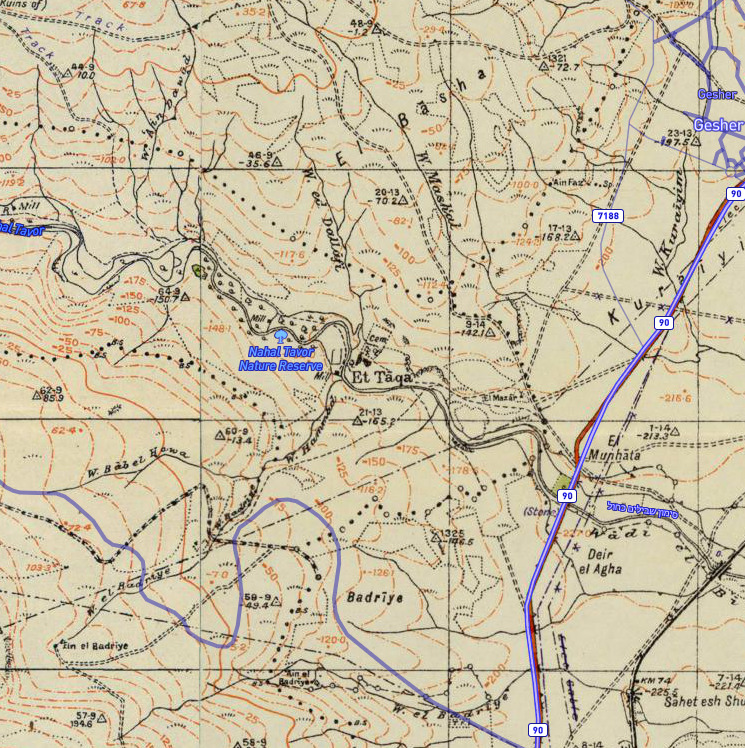
- 1870s map 1940s map modern map 1940s with modern overlay map A series of historical maps of the area around Khirbat Al-Taqa (click the buttons)

- Location within Mandatory Palestine
- Coordinates: 32°36′42″N 35°32′14″E
- Palestine grid: 200/224
- Geopolitical entity: Mandatory Palestine
- Subdistrict: Baysan
- Date of depopulation: May 15, 1948

Khirbat Al-Taqa (Arabic: خربة الطاقة), was a Palestinian Arab village in the District of Baysan. It was depopulated by the Israel Defense Forces during the 1948 Arab-Israeli War on May 15, 1948, under Operation Gideon. It was located 14 km north of Baysan nearby Wadi al-Bira which powered several mills in the village.

== History ==
It was classified as a hamlet in the Palestine Index Gazetteer.

Following the war the area was incorporated into the State of Israel and the land was left undeveloped.

== Bibliography ==
- Khalidi, W. (1992). All That Remains: The Palestinian Villages Occupied and Depopulated by Israel in 1948. Washington D.C.: Institute for Palestine Studies. ISBN 0-88728-224-5.
- Morris, B. (2004). The Birth of the Palestinian Refugee Problem Revisited. Cambridge University Press. ISBN 978-0-521-00967-6.
