= Farwana =

Farwana فرونه Khirbet Farwana, Rohob, Rehob, Tel Rehov
- Etymology: Tellûl Farwanah, the mounds of Farwannah, p.n.
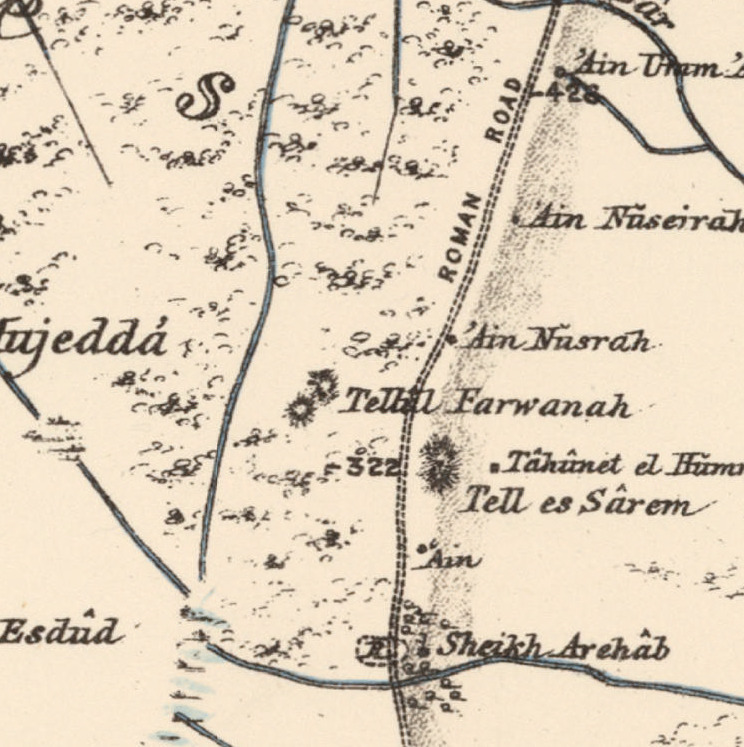
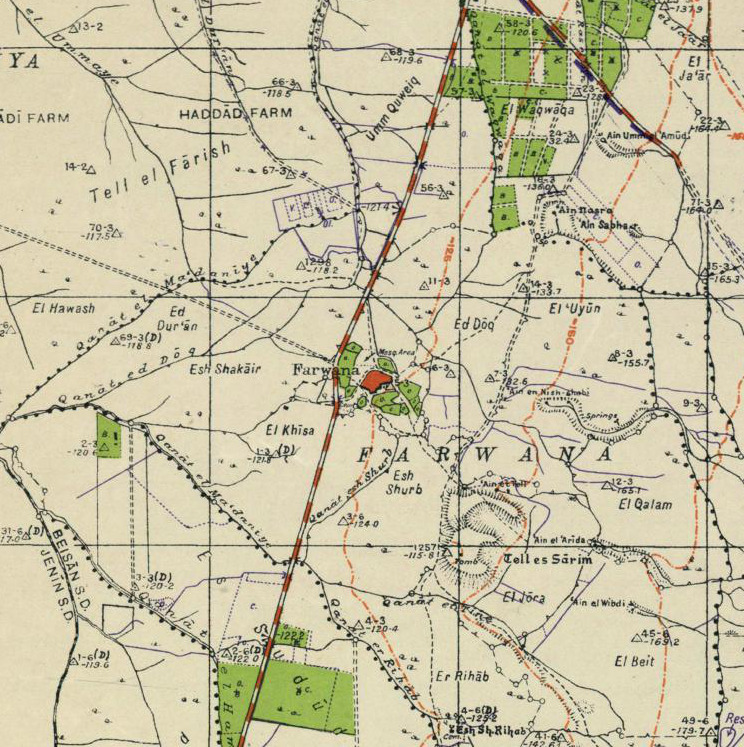
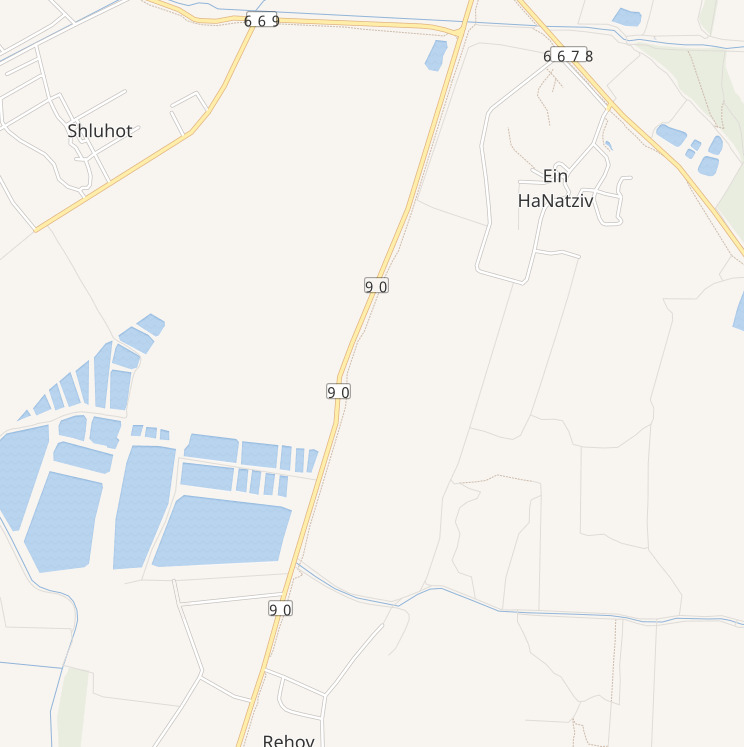
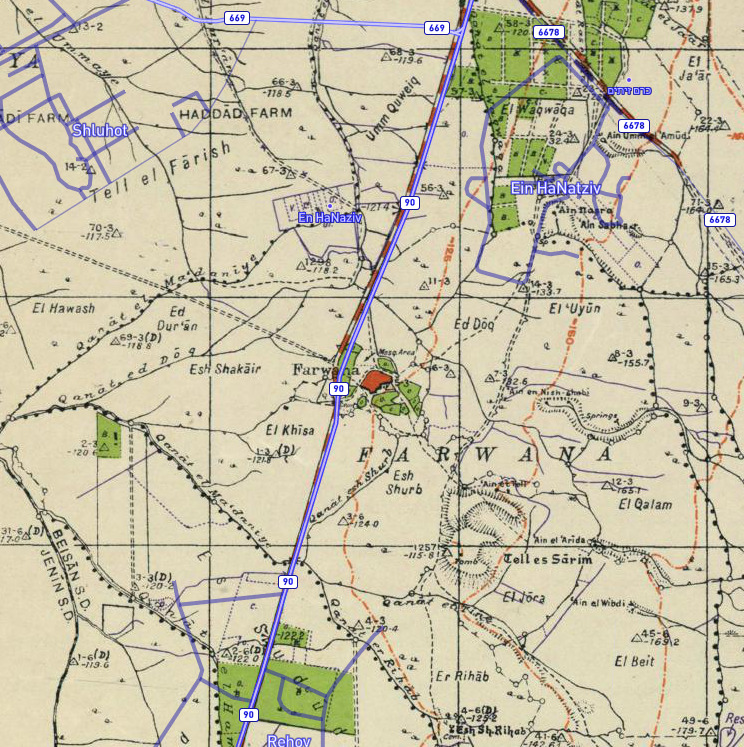
- 1870s map 1940s map modern map 1940s with modern overlay map A series of historical maps of the area around Farwana (click the buttons)

- Location within Mandatory Palestine
- Coordinates: 32°27′47″N 35°29′37″E
- Palestine grid: 196/207
- Geopolitical entity: Mandatory Palestine
- Subdistrict: Baysan
- Date of depopulation: 11 May 1948

Area
  - Total: 4,996 dunams (4.996 km^{2}; 1.929 sq mi)

Population (1945)
  - Total: 330
- Cause(s) of depopulation: Military assault by Yishuv forces
- Current Localities: Rechov Chawwat Eden

Farwana (Arabic: فرونه), was a Palestinian village, located 4.5 kilometers (2.8 mi) south of Bisan, depopulated in 1948.

== History and archaeology ==
=== Identification and periods of settlement ===
The tell, or archaeological mound, of Tell es-Sarem (Arabic name) or Tel Rehov (Hebrew name) is located on the former village's lands. The tell, which stands about 800 metres southeast of the village site, has been identified with the ancient Canaanite and Israelite city of Rehov. It was one of the largest cities in the region during the Late Bronze Age (1550–1200 BCE) and Iron Age I-IIA (1200–900 BCE). During the Late Bronze Age, Egypt ruled over Canaan, and in this time period Rehov was mentioned in at least three sources dated between the 15th-13th century BCE, and again in the list of conquests of Pharaoh Shoshenq I, whose campaign took place around 925 BCE.

During the Byzantine period, a Jewish town that preserved the old name in the form of Rohob, stood one kilometre northwest of Tel Rehov, at Khirbet Farwana/Horbat Parva and was mentioned by Eusebius as being on the fourth mile from Scythopolis, modern-day Beit She'an/Bisan.

Identification of Tell es-Sarem/Tel Rehov with ancient Rehob was based on the preservation of the name at the nearby Islamic holy tomb of esh-Sheikh er-Rihab (one kilometre to the south of Tel Rehov), and the existence of the ruins of Byzantine-period Rohob one kilometre northwest of Tel Rehov. The name of the excavation site of Rohob is given as Khirbet Farwana (khirbet meaning "site of ruins" in Arabic) and Horbot Parva ("Parva Ruins" in Hebrew).

Archaeological work at Farwana proper has also exposed pottery and other finds from the Iron Age, the Persian, Hellenistic, Roman, Byzantine, Early Islamic, Crusader, Mamluk and Ottoman periods.

=== Byzantine period ===
Remains of a Byzantine-period synagogue from the fourth to the seventh century CE were found at Tulul Farwana ("mounds of Farwana").

=== Ottoman period ===
In 1517, Farwana was incorporated into the Ottoman Empire with the rest of Palestine. In 1596, it appeared in Ottoman tax registers as Farina, being in the Nahiya of Gawr of the Liwa of Ajlun. It had a population of 80 households and 2 bachelors, all Muslim. The villagers paid taxes on wheat, barley, sesame, goats or beehives, and water buffaloes, in addition to "occasional revenues"; a total of 13,000 akçe.

In 1870 Victor Guérin noted that the place was strewn with black stones, apparently basaltic.

In 1882, the PEF's Survey of Western Palestine found at Tellul Farwana "small mounds, apparently artificial."

=== British Mandate period ===
In the 1922 census of Palestine, conducted in Mandatory Palestine authorities, Farwaneh had a population of 84 Muslims, increasing in the 1931 census to 286, still all Muslims, in 72 houses.

In the 1945 statistics, the population was 330 Muslims, with a total of 4,996 dunams of land. Of this, 42 dunams were for plantations or irrigable land, 3,847 for cereals, while 11 were built-up (urban) land.

=== 1948 war ===
Farwana had a population of over 300 people when it was depopulated in the lead up to the 1948 Arab-Israeli war. Its Arab inhabitants, along with those of the neighbouring village of al-Ashrafiyya fled to Jordan with the approach of the pre-state Yishuv forces of the Golani Brigade during Operation Gideon on 11 May 1948. The following day, the more than 72 houses that made up the village were completely destroyed. Farwana's inhabitants never returned to the village, and they and their descendants make up one small part of the current population of more than 4 million Palestinian refugees worldwide.

=== State of Israel ===
The Jewish Israeli moshav of Rechov (established in 1951) and the government field station Havat Eden were established on the former lands of Farwana. Kibbutz Ein HaNatziv was established in 1946 northeast of the village site, but on land belonging to Baysan, while Sdei Trumot, west of the village site, is on land belonging to Al-Samiriyya.

In 1992 the village site was described: "The only remains of the village are the ruined walls and floors of houses. The site is overgrown with wild vegetation and contains an archeological dig. The lands around it are cultivated by Israelis."

== See also ==
- Depopulated Palestinian locations in Israel

== Bibliography ==
- Alexandre, Yardenna (2017-01-11). "Horbat Parva" (129). Hadashot Arkheologiyot – Excavations and Surveys in Israel.
- Barron, J. B., ed. (1923). Palestine: Report and General Abstracts of the Census of 1922. Government of Palestine.
- Conder, C.R.; Kitchener, H.H. (1882). The Survey of Western Palestine: Memoirs of the Topography, Orography, Hydrography, and Archaeology. Vol. 2. London: Committee of the Palestine Exploration Fund.
- Dauphin, C. (1998). La Palestine byzantine, Peuplement et Populations. BAR International Series 726 (in French). Vol. III : Catalogue. Oxford: Archeopress. ISBN 0-860549-05-4.
- Department of Statistics (1945). Village Statistics, April, 1945. Government of Palestine.
- Guérin, V. (1874). Description Géographique Historique et Archéologique de la Palestine (in French). Vol. 2: Samarie, pt. 1. Paris: L'Imprimerie Nationale.
- Hadawi, S. (1970). Village Statistics of 1945: A Classification of Land and Area ownership in Palestine. Palestine Liberation Organization Research Centre.
- Hütteroth, W.-D.; Abdulfattah, K. (1977). Historical Geography of Palestine, Transjordan and Southern Syria in the Late 16th Century. Erlanger Geographische Arbeiten, Sonderband 5. Erlangen, Germany: Vorstand der Fränkischen Geographischen Gesellschaft. ISBN 3-920405-41-2.
- Khalidi, W. (1992). All That Remains: The Palestinian Villages Occupied and Depopulated by Israel in 1948. Washington D.C.: Institute for Palestine Studies. ISBN 0-88728-224-5.
- Mills, E., ed. (1932). Census of Palestine 1931. Population of Villages, Towns and Administrative Areas. Jerusalem: Government of Palestine.
- Morris, B. (2004). The Birth of the Palestinian Refugee Problem Revisited. Cambridge University Press. ISBN 978-0-521-00967-6.
- Palmer, E.H. (1881). The Survey of Western Palestine: Arabic and English Name Lists Collected During the Survey by Lieutenants Conder and Kitchener, R. E. Transliterated and Explained by E.H. Palmer. Committee of the Palestine Exploration Fund.
