= Khirbat Umm Sabuna =

Umm Sabuna خربة أم صابونة Kh. Umm Sabôny
- Village
- Etymology: the ruin of the mother of the soap-maker
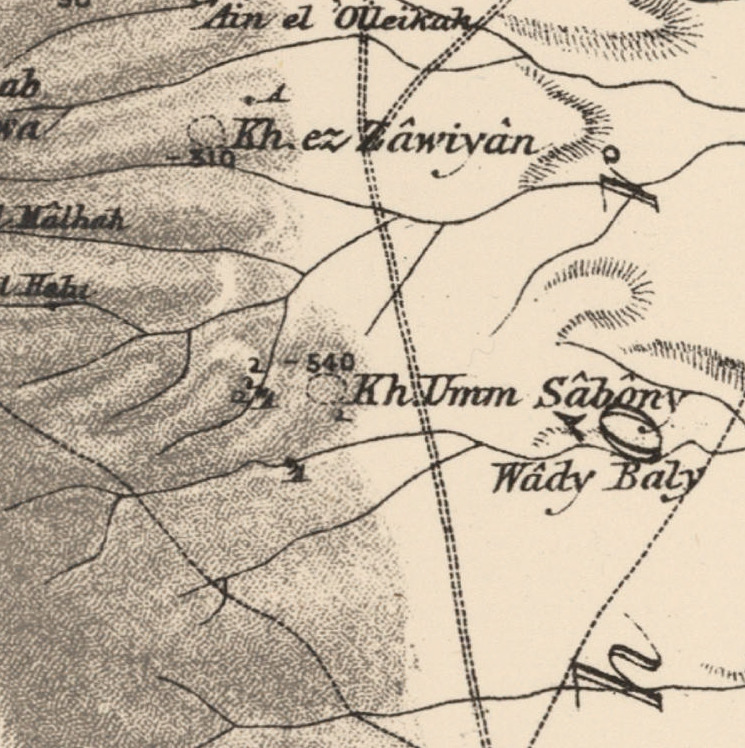
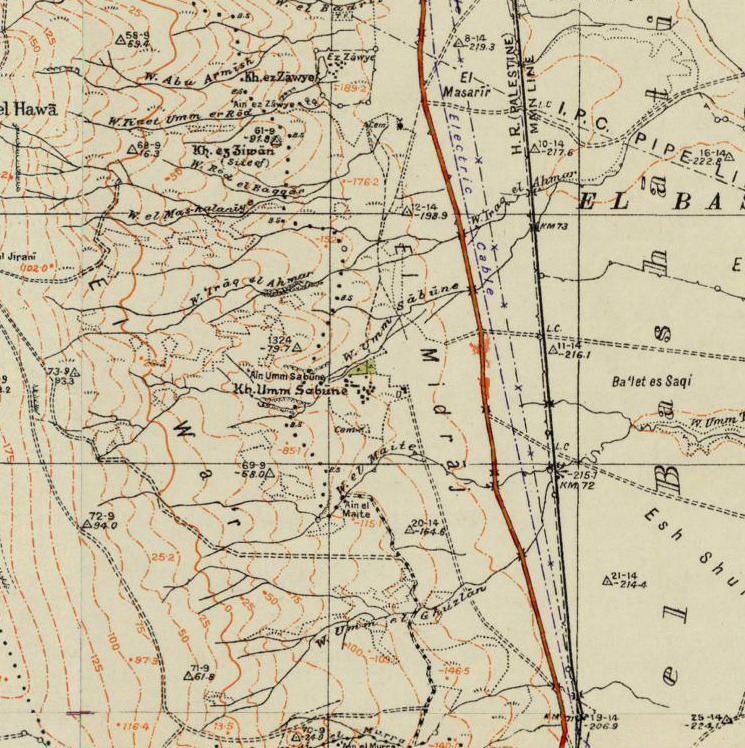
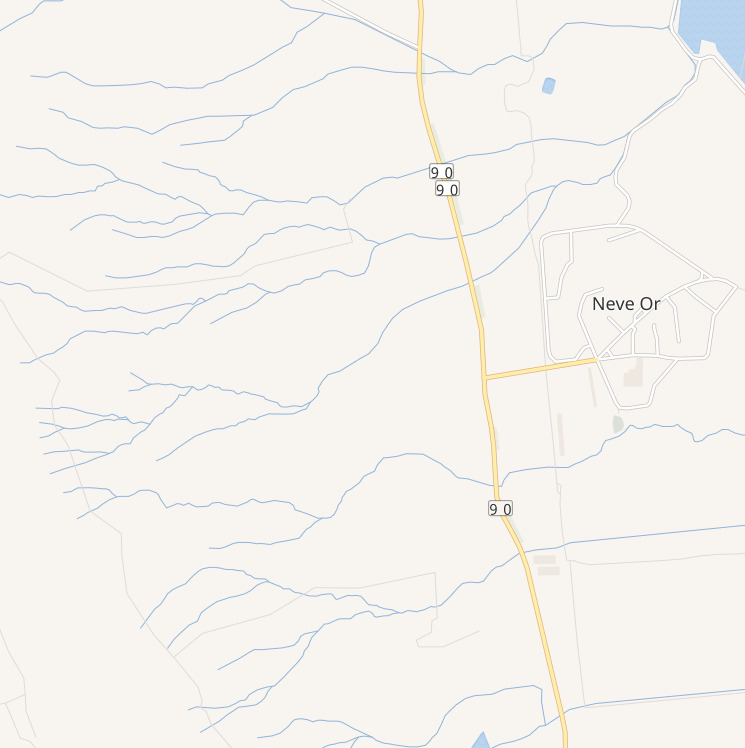
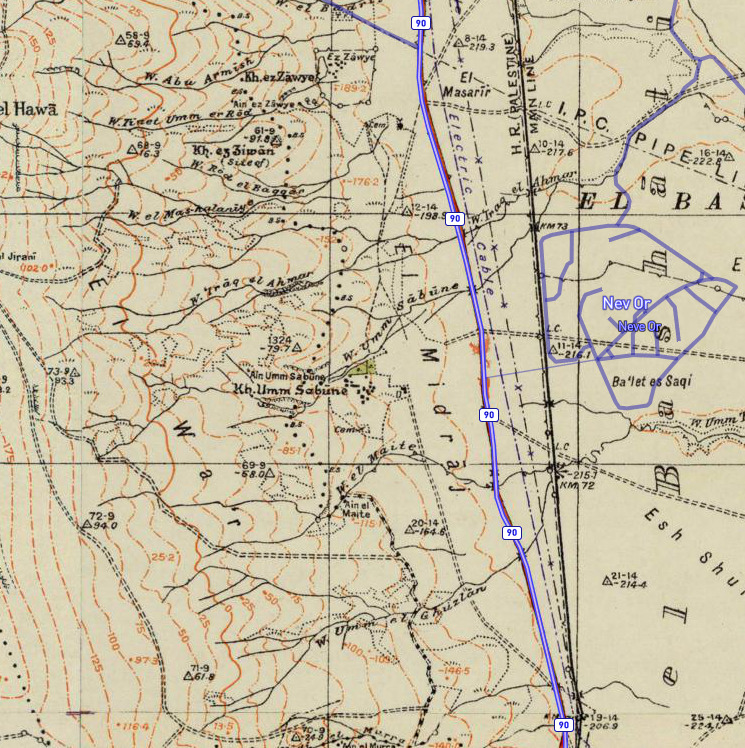
- 1870s map 1940s map modern map 1940s with modern overlay map A series of historical maps of the area around Khirbat Umm Sabuna (click the buttons)

- Location within Mandatory Palestine
- Coordinates: 32°35′10″N 35°32′32″E
- Palestine grid: 201/221
- Geopolitical entity: Mandatory Palestine
- Subdistrict: Baysan
- Date of depopulation: May 21, 1948

Population (1948)
  - Total: 868

Umm Sabuna (Arabic: خربة أم صابونة), was a Palestinian Arab village in the District of Baysan. It was depopulated by the Israel Defense Forces during the 1948 Arab-Israeli War on May 21, 1948, as part of Operation Gideon. It was located 10.5 km northeast of Baysan and the 'Ayn Umm-Sabuna provided the village with water.

== Location ==
Umm Sabuna was located at the foothill south-east of Kawkab al-Hawa.

== History ==
=== Ottoman era ===
In 1882, the PEF's Survey of Western Palestine found at Kh. Umm Sabôn "Foundations of buildings, apparently modern."

=== British Mandate era ===
In the 1931 census of Palestine, conducted by the Mandatory Palestine authorities, it was counted under the Arab Es Saqr, who had a total population of 444; 443 Muslims and 1 Christian, in a total of 85 houses.

The village was classified as a "hamlet" by the Palestine Index Gazetteer.

The population in 1948 was 868.

=== 1948 and aftermath ===
Khirbat Umm Sabuna presumably became depopulated as part of Operation Gideon, between 16 and 21 May, 1948. Following the war the area was incorporated into the State of Israel. Kibbutz Neve Ur was established in 1949, 1 km east of the village site.

In 1992, the village site was described: "Only stone rubble remains on the village site. An orchard owned by the Neve Ur kibbutz is on village land. The hilly areas around the site are used by Israeli farmers for grazing."

== Bibliography ==
- Conder, C.R.; Kitchener, H.H. (1882). The Survey of Western Palestine: Memoirs of the Topography, Orography, Hydrography, and Archaeology. Vol. 2. London: Committee of the Palestine Exploration Fund.
- Khalidi, W. (1992). All That Remains: The Palestinian Villages Occupied and Depopulated by Israel in 1948. Washington D.C.: Institute for Palestine Studies. ISBN 0-88728-224-5.
- Mills, E., ed. (1932). Census of Palestine 1931. Population of Villages, Towns and Administrative Areas. Jerusalem: Government of Palestine.
- Palmer, E.H. (1881). The Survey of Western Palestine: Arabic and English Name Lists Collected During the Survey by Lieutenants Conder and Kitchener, R. E. Transliterated and Explained by E.H. Palmer. Committee of the Palestine Exploration Fund.
