= Al-Fatur =

Al-Fatur الفاتور
- Etymology: El Fâtûr, the fissures, rocks and a spring
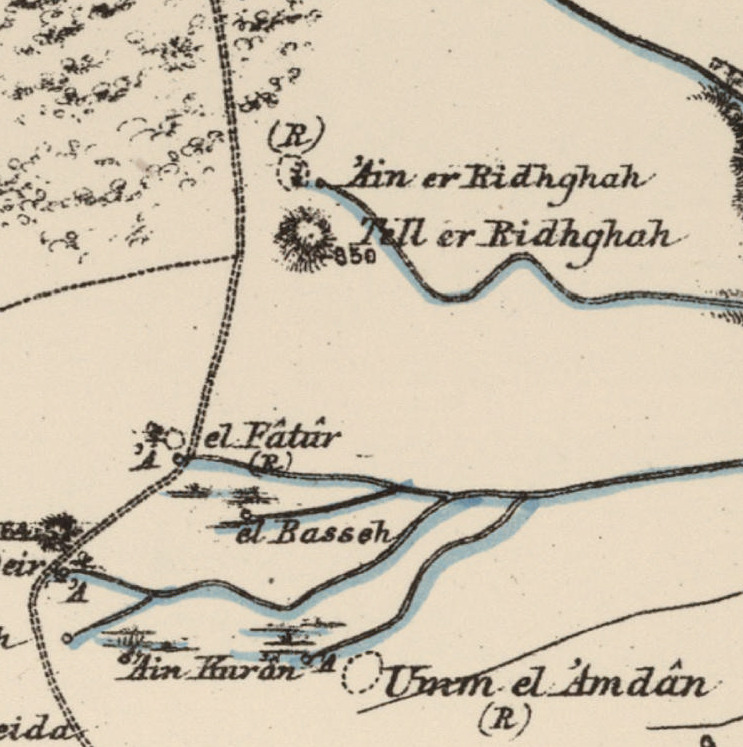
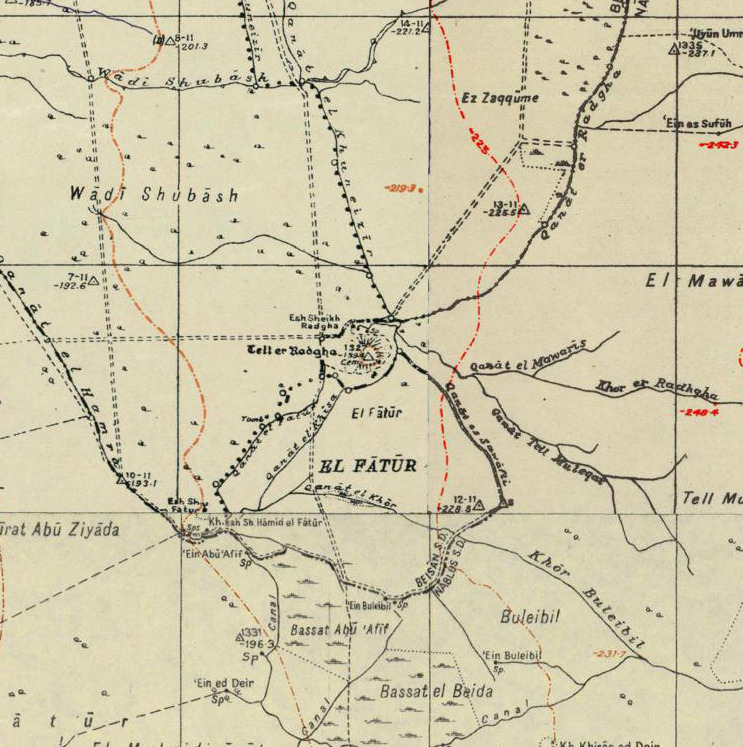
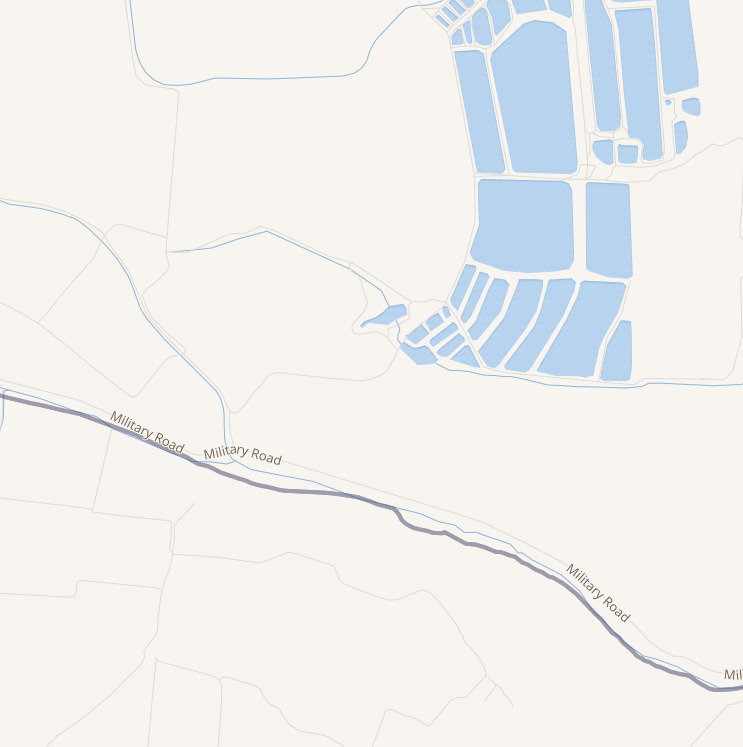
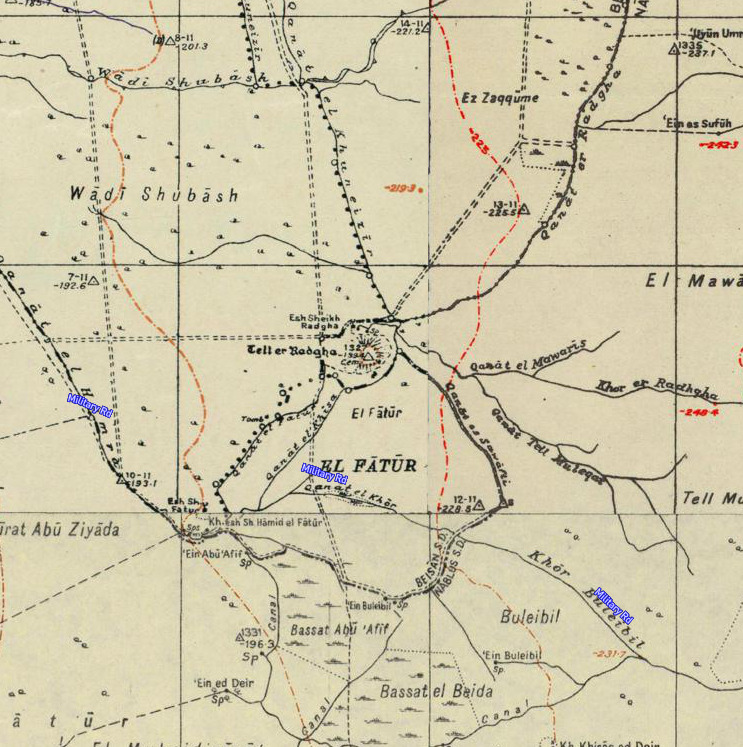
- 1870s map 1940s map modern map 1940s with modern overlay map A series of historical maps of the area around Al-Fatur (click the buttons)

- Location within Mandatory Palestine
- Coordinates: 32°23′55″N 35°31′36″E
- Palestine grid: 199/200
- Geopolitical entity: Mandatory Palestine
- Subdistrict: Baysan

Area
  - Total: 729 dunams (72.9 ha; 180 acres)

Population (1945)
  - Total: 110
- Current Localities: Mechola

Al-Fatur was a Palestinian Arab village in the District of Baysan. It was depopulated during the 1947–1948 Civil War in Mandatory Palestine on May 12, 1948. It was located 11.5 km south of Baysan. The village was attacked by the Israel Defense Forces as part of Operation Gideon.

== History ==
In 1881 E.H. Palmer reported "rocks and a spring" at El Fâtûr.

=== British Mandate of Palestine ers ===
In the 1931 census of Palestine, conducted by the Mandatory Palestine authorities, Arab el-Fatur had a population of 66, all Muslims, in 16 houses.

In the 1945 statistics, the population was 110 Muslims, with a total of 729 dunams of land. Of this, 709 dunams were for cereals, while 20 were non-cultivable land.

Tirat Zvi, established in 1938, is located north of village land, while Mechola (198/196), founded in 1968, is some 5 km southwest of the site of Al-Fatur, and uses some of its lands.

== Bibliography ==
- Government of Palestine, Department of Statistics (1945). Village Statistics, April, 1945.
- Hadawi, S. (1970). Village Statistics of 1945: A Classification of Land and Area ownership in Palestine. Palestine Liberation Organization Research Center. Archived from the original on 2018-12-08.
- Khalidi, W. (1992). All That Remains:The Palestinian Villages Occupied and Depopulated by Israel in 1948. Washington D.C.: Institute for Palestine Studies. ISBN 0-88728-224-5.
- Mills, E., ed. (1932). Census of Palestine 1931. Population of Villages, Towns and Administrative Areas. Jerusalem: Government of Palestine.
- Palmer, E.H. (1881). The Survey of Western Palestine: Arabic and English Name Lists Collected During the Survey by Lieutenants Conder and Kitchener, R. E. Transliterated and Explained by E.H. Palmer. Committee of the Palestine Exploration Fund.
