= Arab al-Safa =

Arab al-Safa عرب الصفا
- Village
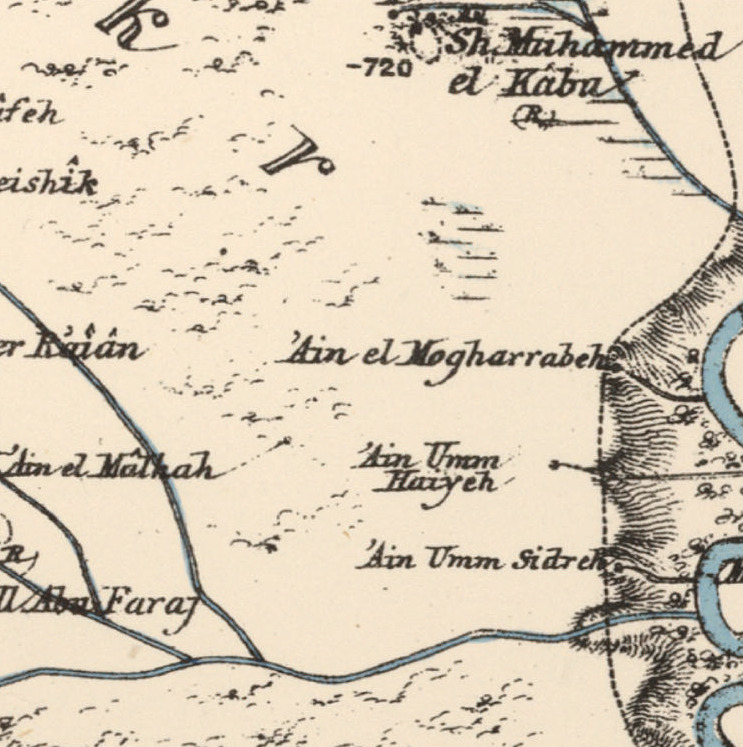
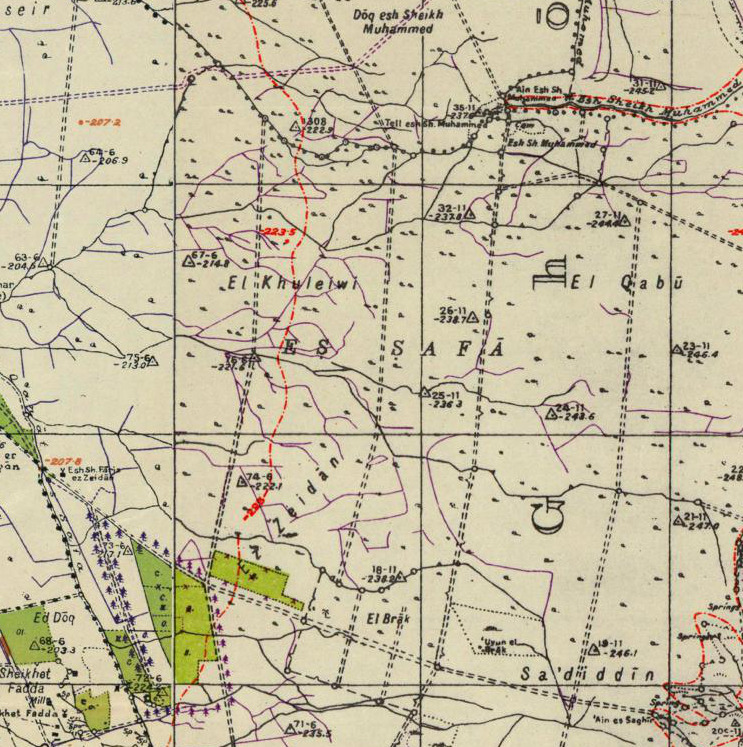
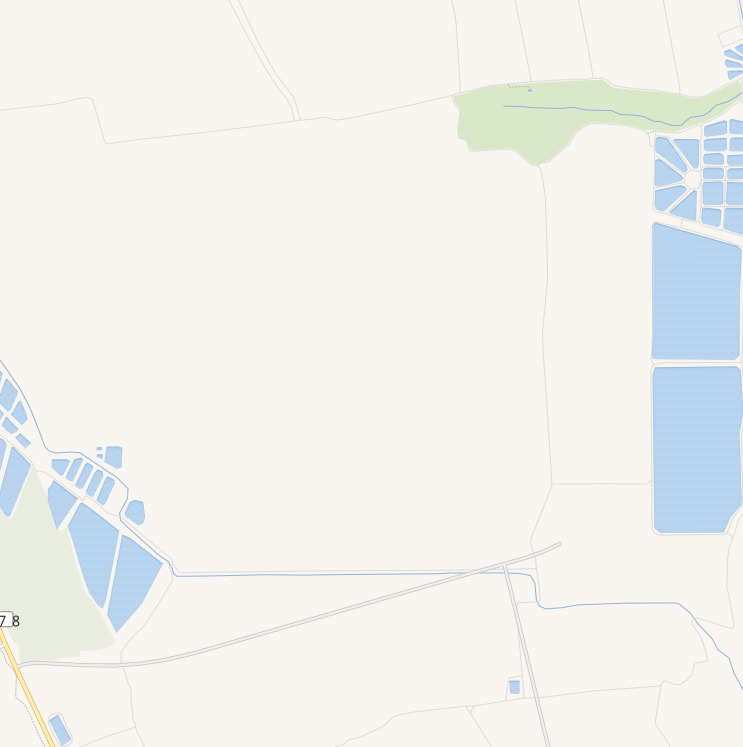
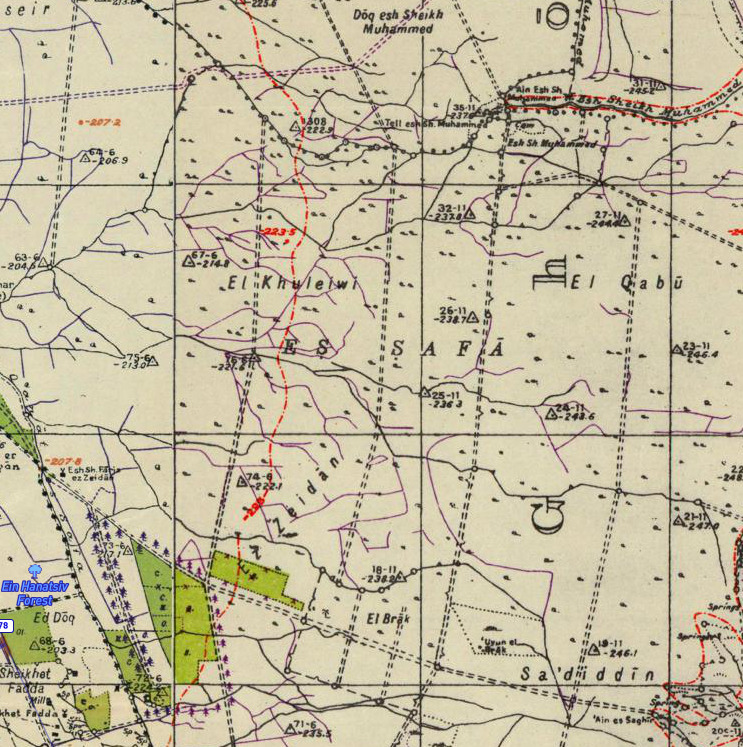
- 1870s map 1940s map modern map 1940s with modern overlay map A series of historical maps of the area around Arab al-Safa (click the buttons)

- Location within Mandatory Palestine
- Coordinates: 32°26′27″N 35°32′16″E
- Palestine grid: 200/205
- Geopolitical entity: Mandatory Palestine
- Subdistrict: Baysan
- Date of depopulation: 20 May 1948

Area
  - Total: 12,518 dunams (12.518 km^{2}; 4.833 sq mi)

Population (1945)
  - Total: 650
- Cause(s) of depopulation: Influence of nearby town's fall

Arab al-Safa (Arabic: عرب الصفا) was a majority Arab village in the District of Baysan in the times of Ottoman Palestine and through the British Mandatory Palestine period, located 7.5 km (4.7 mi) south of Beit She'an. The village was destroyed and rendered inhabitable on 20 May 1948 by the IDF's Golani Brigade under Operation Gideon during the 1948 Arab-Israeli War.

== History ==
=== Ottoman empire era ===
Arab al-Safa originated as a Bedouin summer work camp, before becoming a permanent village by the late 19th century. It transitioned to focus on agriculture, particularly grains, as noted by traveler Victor Guérin. During the late Ottoman period (ending in 1918), Arab al-Safa was part of a local district called the Baysan nahiye, an administrative unit for villages and rural areas within the larger Beisan subdistrict. This area fell under the broader Acre district as the Ottoman reforms (Tanzimat) from 1864 onward reorganized the entire Palestine region's governance into shifting provinces for better tax collection and control.

=== British Mandate era ===
In the 1922 census of Palestine, conducted by the Mandatory Palestine authorities, Saffa had a population of 255 Muslims, increasing in the 1931 census to 540; 4 Christians and the rest Muslims, in 108 houses.

In the 1945 statistics, the population consisted of 650 Muslims, and the total land area was 12,518 dunams, according to an official land and population survey. The land ownership in the village (in dunams) was as follows:

| Owner | Dunams |
|---|---|
| Arab | 7,549 |
| Jewish | 2,523 |
| Public | 2,446 |
| Total | 12,518 |

By 1945, the Arab population were occupied mainly in cereal farming. The use of village land in that year:

| Land Usage | Arab | Jewish | Public |
|---|---|---|---|
| Citrus and bananas | - | 49 | - |
| Irrigated and plantation | - | 14 | - |
| Cereal | 7,449 | 2,460 | 922 |
| Urban | - | - | - |
| Cultivable | 7,449 | 2,523 | 922 |
| Non-cultivable | 100 | - | 1,524 |

The population had grown to 754 by 1948, with 150 houses.

=== 1948 and aftermath ===
The village was depopulated on 20 May 1948, a week after the fall of Baysan Following the war the area was incorporated into the State of Israel, with the village's land left undeveloped; the closest villages are the kibbutzim of Tirat Zvi (established 1937) to the south-west and Sde Eliyahu (established 1939) to the west.

In 1992 the village site was described: "Three palm trees stand on the village site. The surrounding lands are used for growing wheat."

== Bibliography ==
- Barron, J.B., ed. (1923). Palestine: Report and General Abstracts of the Census of 1922. Government of Palestine.
- Government of Palestine, Department of Statistics (1945). Village Statistics, April, 1945.
- Hadawi, S. (1970). Village Statistics of 1945: A Classification of Land and Area ownership in Palestine. Palestine Liberation Organization Research Center.
- Khalidi, W. (1992). All That Remains: The Palestinian Villages Occupied and Depopulated by Israel in 1948. Washington D.C.: Institute for Palestine Studies. ISBN 0-88728-224-5.
- Mills, E., ed. (1932). Census of Palestine 1931. Population of Villages, Towns and Administrative Areas. Jerusalem: Government of Palestine.
- Morris, B. (2004). The Birth of the Palestinian Refugee Problem Revisited. Cambridge University Press. ISBN 978-0-521-00967-6.
