= Tall al-Shawk =

Tall al-Shawk تل الشوك Tall al Shauk
- Village
- Etymology: the mound of thorns
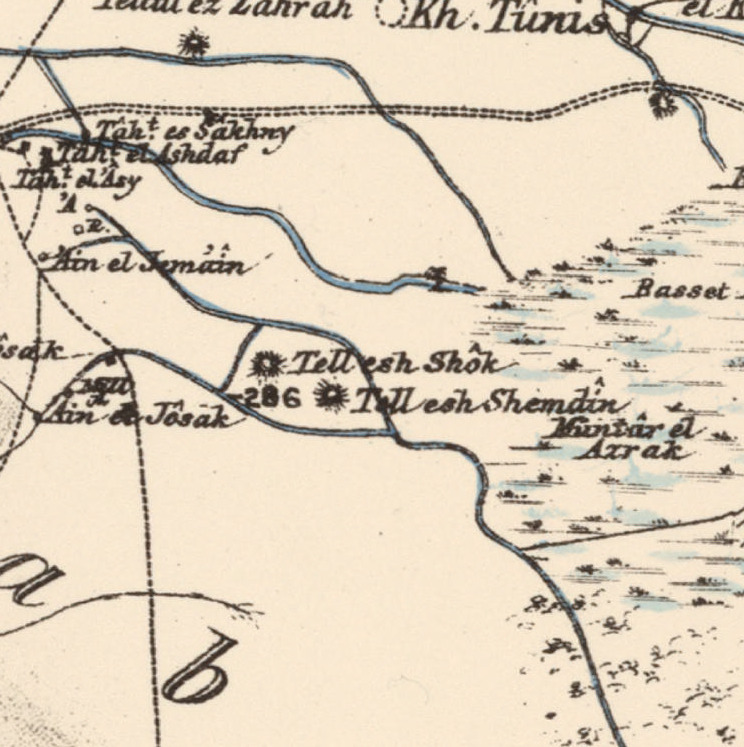
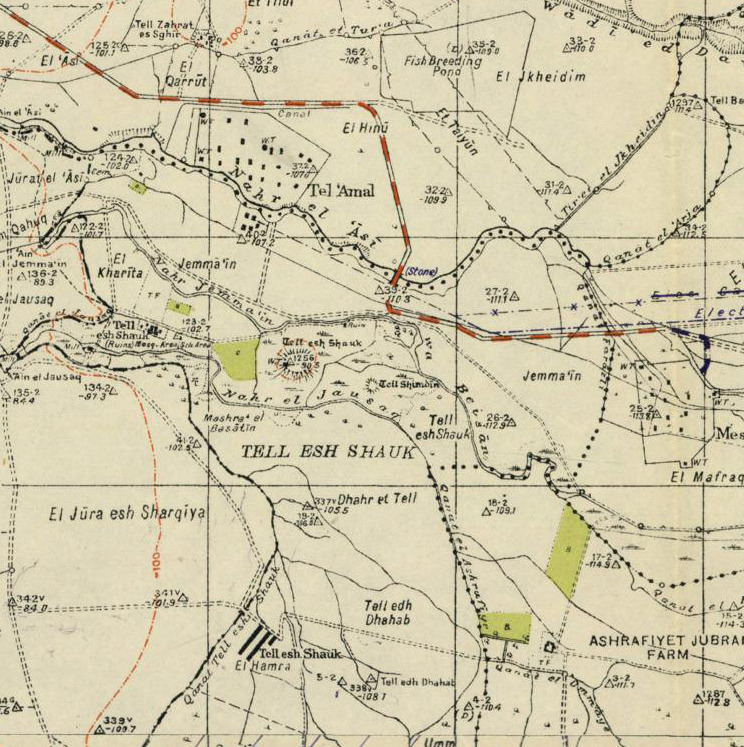
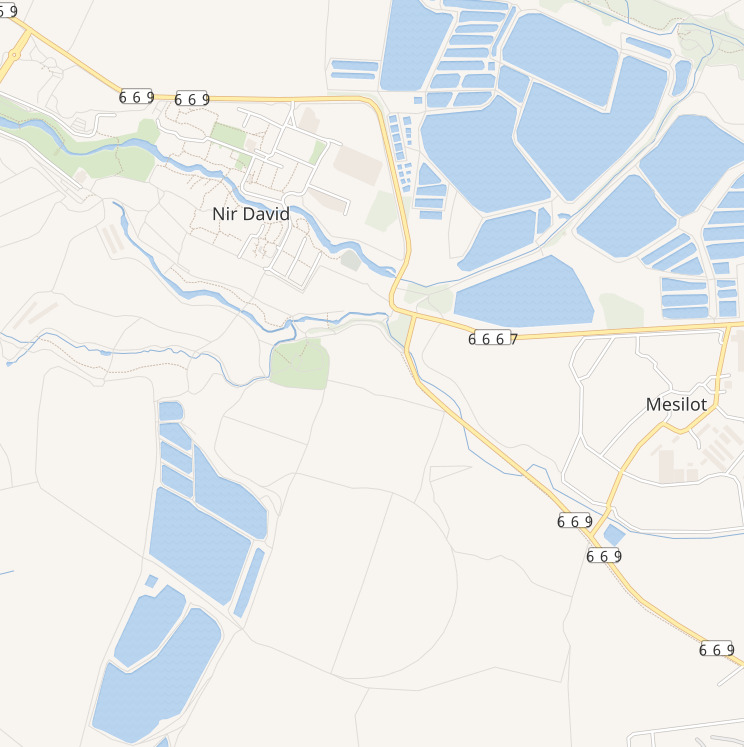
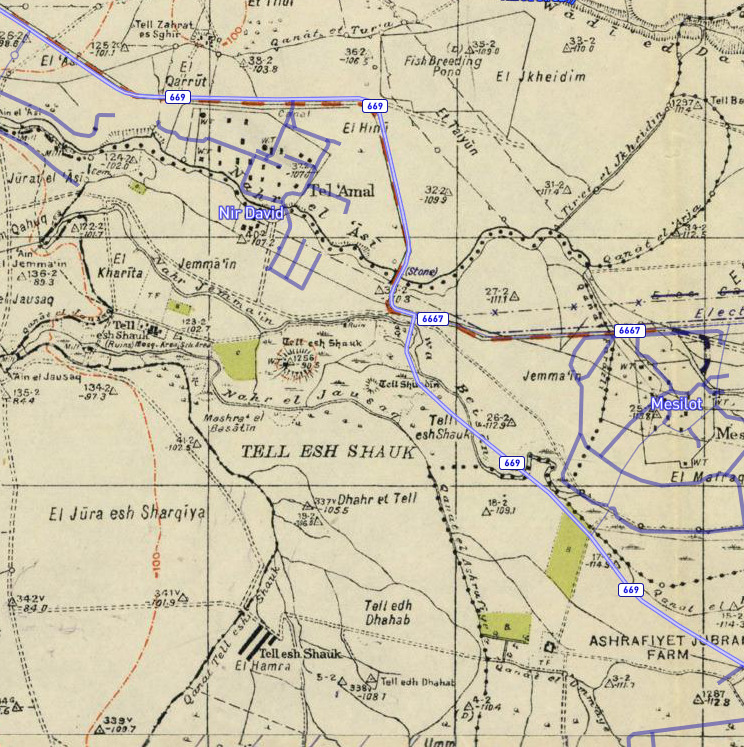
- 1870s map 1940s map modern map 1940s with modern overlay map A series of historical maps of the area around Tall al-Shawk (click the buttons)

- Location within Mandatory Palestine
- Coordinates: 32°29′49″N 35°27′43″E
- Palestine grid: 193/211
- Geopolitical entity: Mandatory Palestine
- Subdistrict: Baysan
- Date of depopulation: May 12, 1948

Population (1945)
  - Total: 120
- Cause(s) of depopulation: Influence of nearby town's fall

Tall al-Shawk (Arabic: تل الشوك), was a Palestinian village in the District of Baysan. It was depopulated by the Israel Defense Forces during the 1947–1948 Civil War in Mandatory Palestine on May 12, 1948, as part of Operation Gideon. It was located five km west of Baysan between the al-Januna'in River to the north and Wadi al-Jawsaq to the south. The village was built above an ancient archeological site and granite columns remain.

== History ==
In 1882 the PEF's Survey of Western Palestine (SWP) described the southern Tell ash Shok as "an artificial earthen mound, with water on either side".

=== British Mandate era ===
In the 1922 census of Palestine, conducted by the Mandatory Palestine authorities, Tall al-Shawk had a population of 58 Muslims, decreasing in the 1931 census to a population of 41 Muslims in 11 houses.

In the 1945 statistics, the village had a population of 120 Muslims, while the total land area was 3,685 dunams. Of this, Arabs used 14 dunums for plantations and irrigable land, 33 for cereals, while 18 dunums were classified as non-cultivable land.

=== 1948 and aftermath ===
Following the war the area was incorporated into the State of Israel and the village's land was left undeveloped. In 1992, no traces of the village site remained, and the site was covered with weeds and thorns.

== Bibliography ==
- Barron, J. B., ed. (1923). Palestine: Report and General Abstracts of the Census of 1922. Government of Palestine.
- Conder, C.R.; Kitchener, H.H. (1882). The Survey of Western Palestine: Memoirs of the Topography, Orography, Hydrography, and Archaeology. Vol. 2. London: Committee of the Palestine Exploration Fund.
- Department of Statistics (1945). Village Statistics, April, 1945. Government of Palestine.
- Hadawi, S. (1970). Village Statistics of 1945: A Classification of Land and Area ownership in Palestine. Palestine Liberation Organization Research Center.
- Khalidi, W. (1992). All That Remains: The Palestinian Villages Occupied and Depopulated by Israel in 1948. Washington D.C.: Institute for Palestine Studies. ISBN 0-88728-224-5.
- Mills, E., ed. (1932). Census of Palestine 1931. Population of Villages, Towns and Administrative Areas. Jerusalem: Government of Palestine.
- Morris, B. (2004). The Birth of the Palestinian Refugee Problem Revisited. Cambridge University Press. ISBN 978-0-521-00967-6.
- Palmer, E.H. (1881). The Survey of Western Palestine: Arabic and English Name Lists Collected During the Survey by Lieutenants Conder and Kitchener, R. E. Transliterated and Explained by E.H. Palmer. Committee of the Palestine Exploration Fund.
