= Beisan Subdistrict, Mandatory Palestine =

Administrative division of British Palestine (1920–1948)

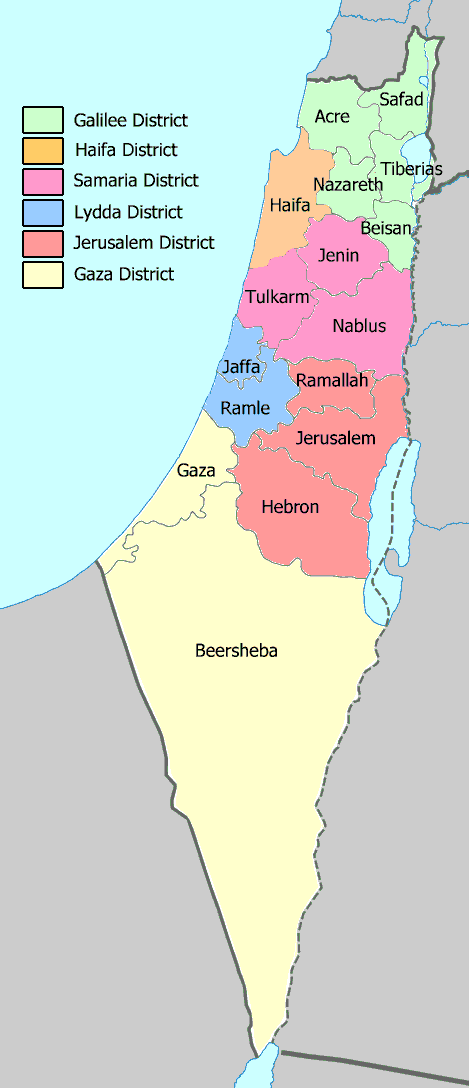
Subdistricts grouped by districts in 1945. Galilee District with Beisan Subdistrict in green.

The Beisan Subdistrict (Arabic: قضاء بيسان; Hebrew: נפת ביסאן) was one of the subdistricts of Mandatory Palestine. It was located around the city of Baysan. After the 1948 Arab-Israeli War, the subdistrict disintegrated; most of it became part of Israel, and has been merged with the neighboring Nazareth Subdistrict to form the modern-day Jezre'el County. The southernmost parts, however, fell within the modern-day West Bank – because of that, they were first occupied and unilaterally annexed by Jordan, and were later occupied by Israel following the Six-Day War.

== Towns and villages ==
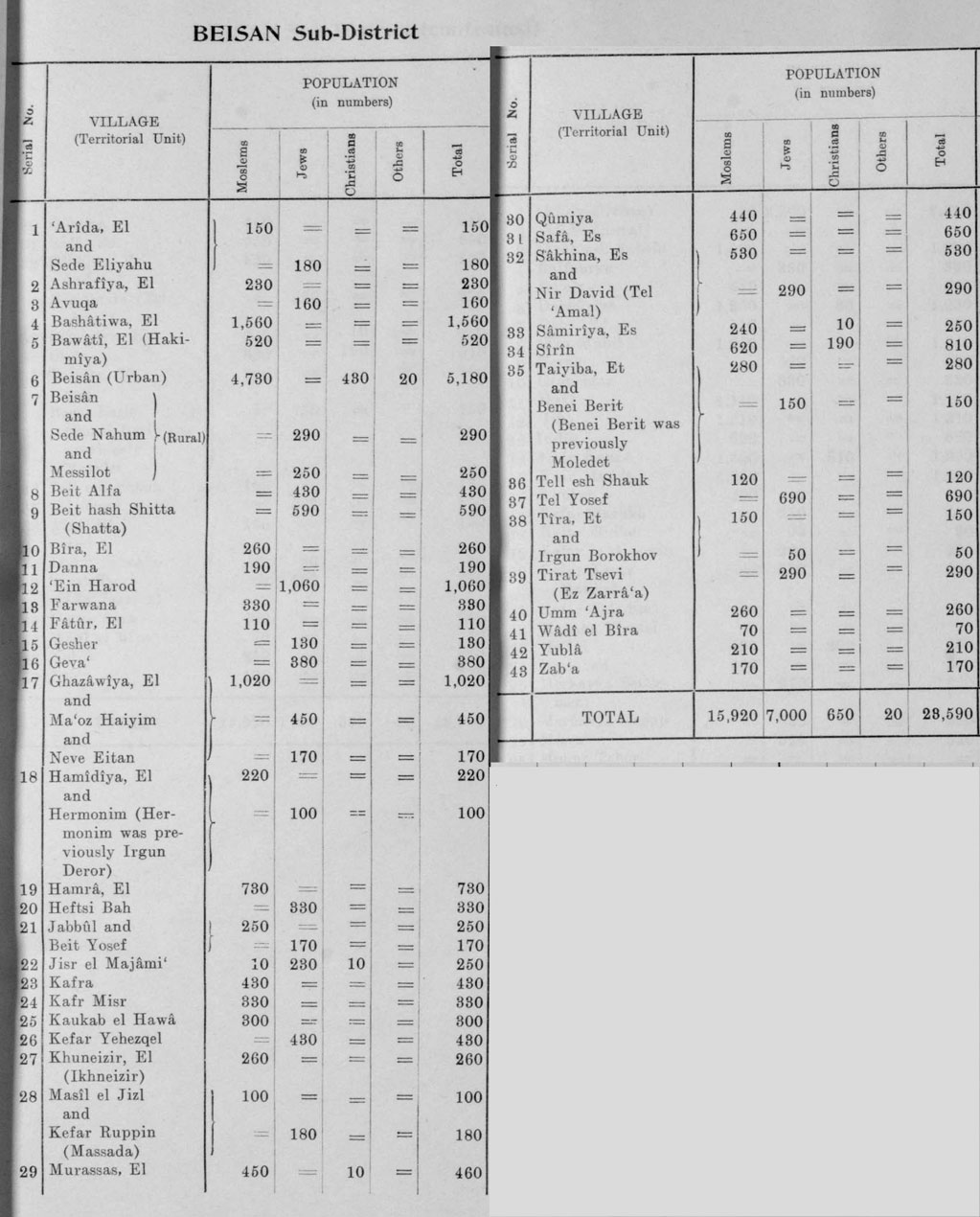
Official population statistics for the sub-district, from Village Statistics, 1945.

Beisan Sub-District – Population by Village
Village	Muslims	Jews	Christians	Others	Total
'Arida (El)	150				150
Sede Eliyahu		180			180
Ashrafiya (El)	230				230
Avuqa		160			160
Bashatiwa (El)	1,560				1,560
Bawati (El Hakimiya)	520				520
Beisan (Urban)	4,730		430	20	5,180
Sede Nahum (Rural)		290			290
Messilot		250			250
Beit Alfa		430			430
Beit Hash Shitta (Shatta)		590			590
Bira (El)	260				260
Danna	190				190
Ein Harod		1,060			1,060
Farwana	330				330
Fatur (El)	110				110
Gesher		130			130
Geva‘		380			380
Ghazawiya (El)	1,020				1,020
Ma‘oz Hayim		450			450
Neve Eitan		170			170
Hamidiya (El)	220				220
Hermonim		100			100
Hamra (El)	730				730
Heftsi Bah		330			330
Jabbul	250				250
Beit Yosef		170			170
Jisr el Majami‘	10	230	10		250
Kafra	430				430
Kafr Misr	330				330
Kaukab el Hawa	300				300
Kefar Yehezqel		430			430
Khuneizir (El)	260				260
Masil el Jizl	100				100
Kefar Ruppin (Massada)		180			180
Murassas (El)	450		10		460
Qumiya	440				440
Safa (Es)	650				650
Sakhina (Es)	530				530
Nir David (Tel ‘Amal)		290			290
Samiriya (Es)	240		10		250
Sirin	620		190		810
Taiyiba (Et)	280				280
Benei Berit		150			150
Tell esh Shauk	120				120
Tel Yosef		690			690
Tira (Et)	150				150
Irgun Borokhov		50			50
Tirat Tsevi (Ez Zarra‘a)		290			290
Umm ‘Ajra	260				260
Wadi el Bira	70				70
Yubla	210				210
Zab‘a	170				170
TOTAL	15,920	7,000	650	20	23,590

=== Depopulated towns and villages ===
- Arab al-'Arida
- Arab al-Bawati
- Arab al-Safa
- al-Ashrafiyya
- Al-Bira
- Beisan
- Danna
- Farwana
- al-Fatur
- al-Ghazzawiyya
- al-Hamidiyya
- Al-Hamra
- Jabbul
- Kafra
- Kawkab al-Hawa
- al-Khunayzir
- Masil al-Jizl
- al-Murassas
- Qumya
- al-Sakhina
- al-Samiriyya
- Sirin
- Tall al-Shawk
- Khirbat Al-Taqa
- al-Tira
- Umm 'Ajra
- Khirbat Umm Sabuna
- Yubla
- Zab'a
- Khirbat Zawiya
