= Al-Sakhina =

Al-Sakhina الساخنة
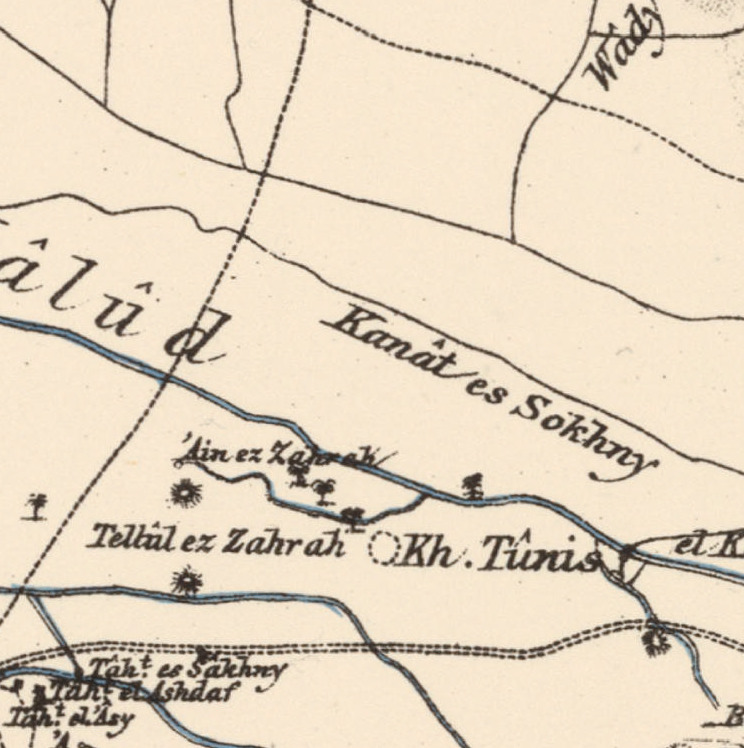
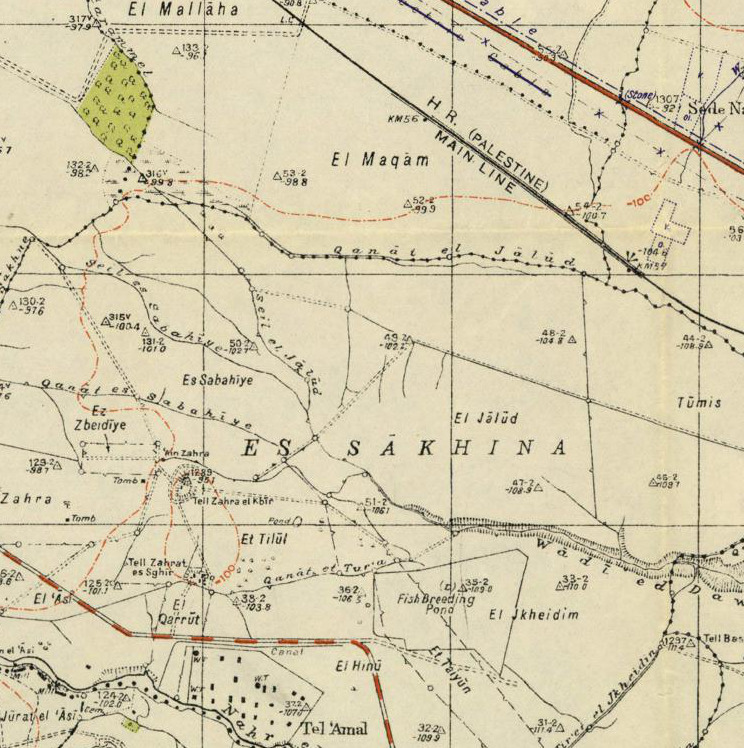
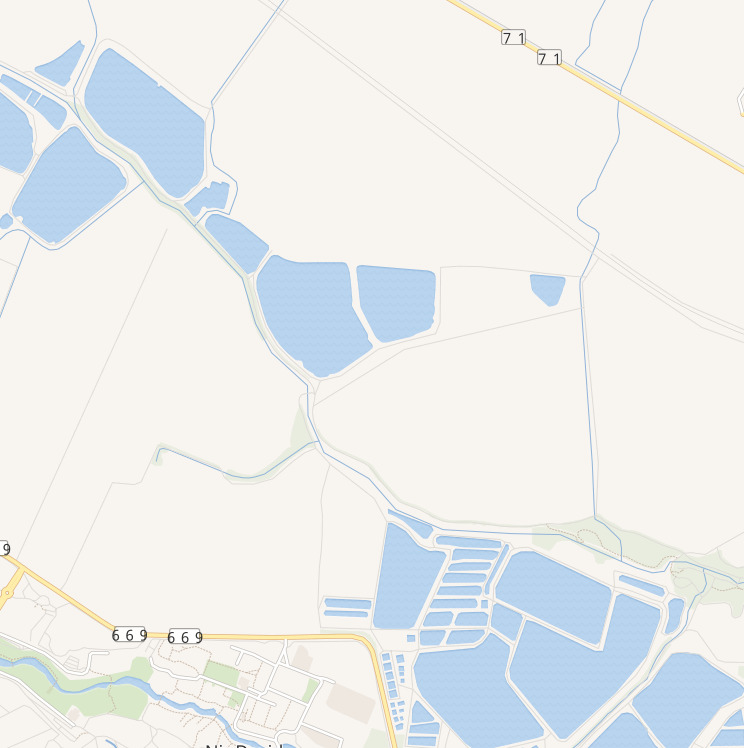
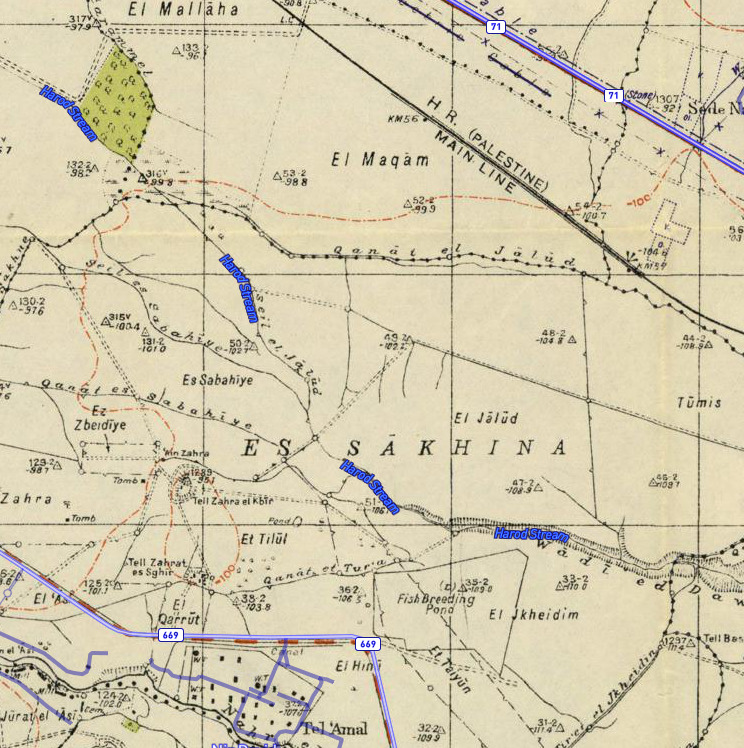
- 1870s map 1940s map modern map 1940s with modern overlay map A series of historical maps of the area around Al-Sakhina (click the buttons)

- Location within Mandatory Palestine
- Coordinates: 32°30′59″N 35°27′44″E
- Palestine grid: 193/213
- Geopolitical entity: Mandatory Palestine
- Subdistrict: Baysan
- Date of depopulation: Not known, possibly 12 May 1948

Area
  - Total: 1,088 dunams (1.088 km^{2}; 0.420 sq mi)

Population (1945)
  - Total: 530
- Current Localities: Nir David

Al-Sakhina (Arabic: الساخنة), was a Palestinian Arab village in the District of Baysan. It was located five kilometres west of Baysan on the Jalud River on its way to the Jordan River. It was depopulated by the Israel Defense Forces during the 1947–1948 Civil War in Mandatory Palestine, possibly on May 12, 1948, as part of Operation Gideon.

== History ==
At the time of the 1931 census, al-Sakhina had 78 occupied houses and a population of 372 Muslims, one Christian, and one Jew. In 1936, a Jewish kibbutz, Tel Amal (later renamed Nir David), was established slightly to the south.

The village and kibbutz together had 530 Muslims and 290 Jews in the 1945 statistics. Arabs used a total of 260 dunums for cereals and 828 dunums were irrigated or used for plantations, while Nir David and Al-Sakhina together had a total of 340 dunams as built-up and non-cultivable land.

== Bibliography ==
- Government of Palestine, Department of Statistics (1945). Village Statistics, April, 1945.
- Hadawi, S. (1970). Village Statistics of 1945: A Classification of Land and Area ownership in Palestine. Palestine Liberation Organization Research Center. Archived from the original on 2018-12-08.
- Khalidi, W. (1992). All That Remains:The Palestinian Villages Occupied and Depopulated by Israel in 1948. Washington D.C.: Institute for Palestine Studies. ISBN 0-88728-224-5.
- Mills, E., ed. (1932). Census of Palestine 1931. Population of Villages, Towns and Administrative Areas. Jerusalem: Government of Palestine.
- Morris, B (2004). The Birth of the Palestinian Refugee Problem Revisited. Cambridge University Press. ISBN 0-521-00967-7.
