= Arab al-Bawati =

Arab al-Bawati عرب البواطي/خربة الحكمة
- Village
- Etymology: Kh. el Hakeimîyeh, the ruin of el Hakeimîyeh
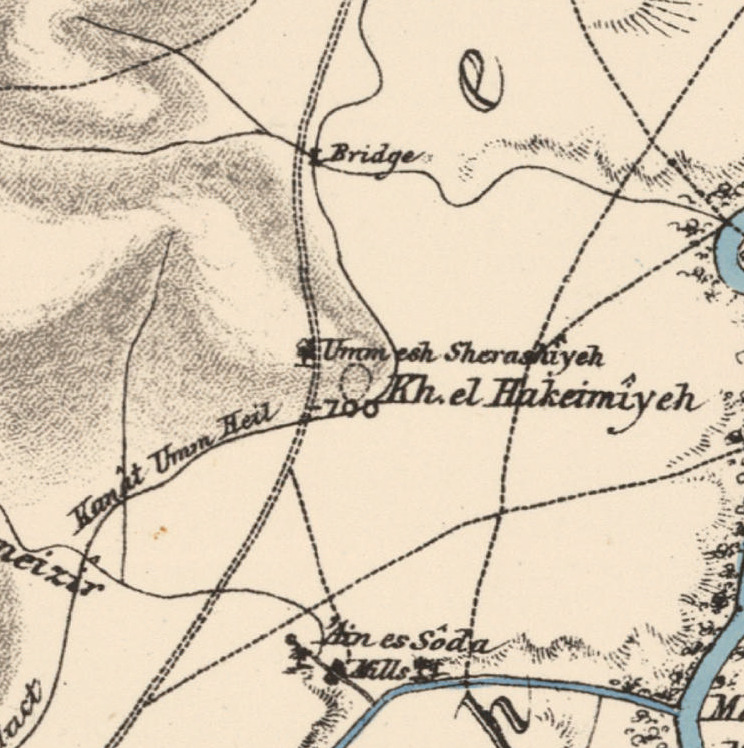
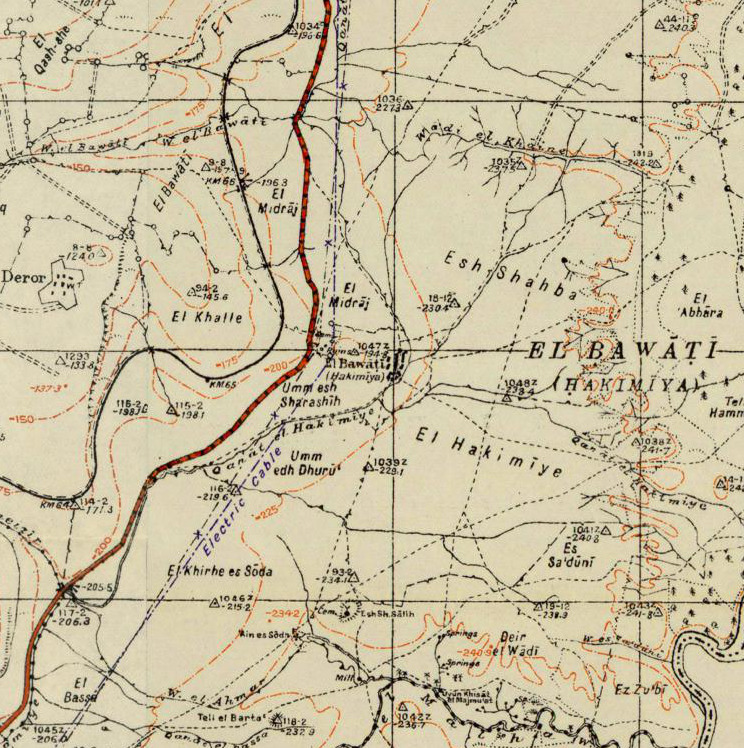
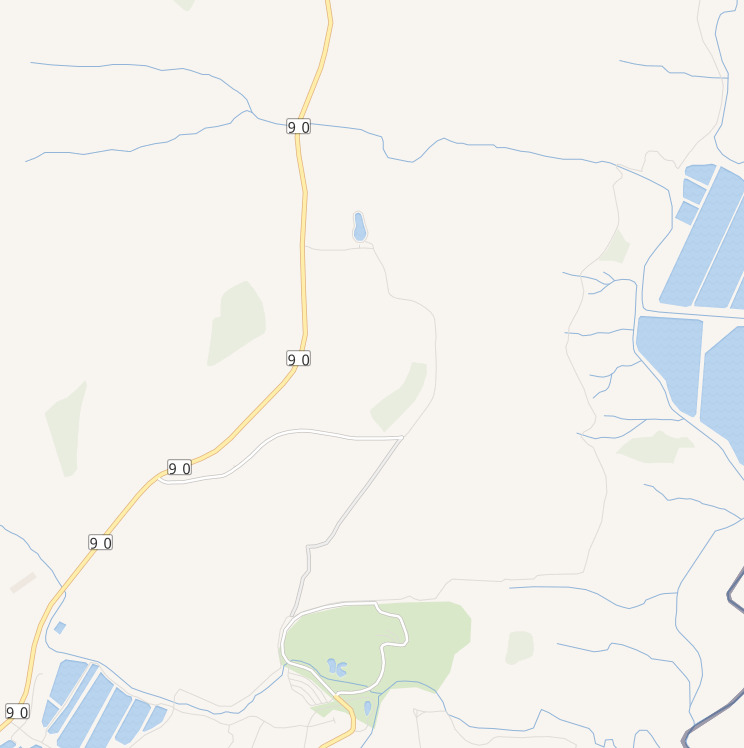
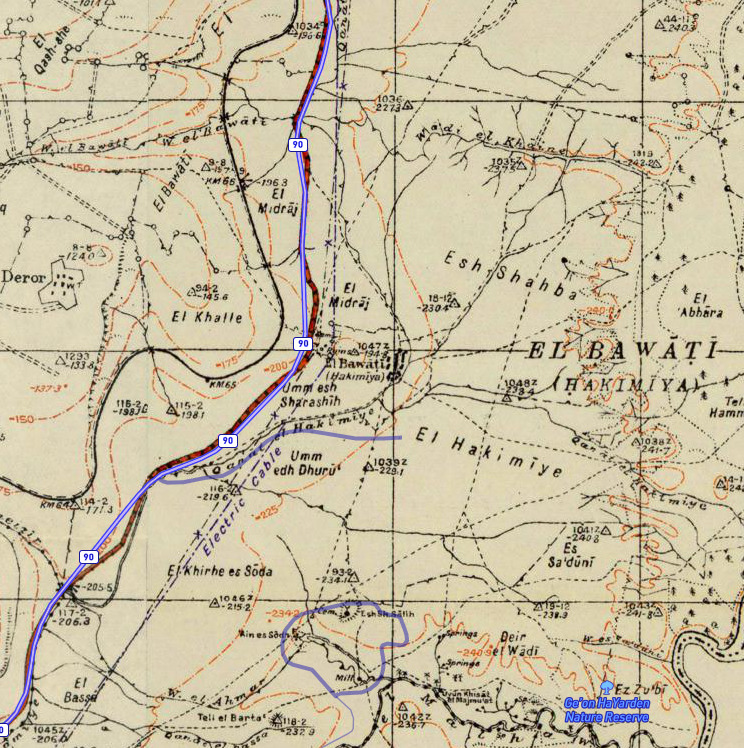
- 1870s map 1940s map modern map 1940s with modern overlay map A series of historical maps of the area around Arab al-Bawati (click the buttons)

- Location within Mandatory Palestine
- Coordinates: 32°31′41″N 35°32′21″E
- Palestine grid: 200/214
- Geopolitical entity: Mandatory Palestine
- Subdistrict: Baysan
- Date of depopulation: 16 or 20 May 1948

Area
  - Total: 10,641 dunams (10.641 km^{2}; 4.109 sq mi)

Population (1945)
  - Total: 520
- Cause(s) of depopulation: Influence of nearby town's fall

Arab al-Bawati (Arabic: عرب البواطي/خربة الحكمة), was a Palestinian Arab village in the District of Baysan. It was depopulated during the 1948 Arab-Israeli War.

It was located 4 kilometres north east of Baysan in the Baysan valley.

== History ==
In 1882, the PEF's Survey of Western Palestine described Kh. el Hakeimiyeh as having "ruined walls and a few modern deserted houses – a small deserted village".

=== British Mandate era ===
In the 1922 census of Palestine, conducted by the Mandatory Palestine authorities, Bawati had a population of 348 Muslims, increasing in the 1931 census to 461 (under the name of 'Arab Hakamiya), still all Muslims, in 86 houses.

In the 1945 statistics it had a population of 520 Muslims with a total of 10,641 dunums of land. That year Arabs used 2,225 dunams of village lands for plantations and irrigated land, 3,335 for cereals, while 52 dunams were classed as uncultivable.

=== 1948 and aftermath ===
Many of the villagers left early in the war, apparently after a Haganah attack. The village was destroyed on May 16, or May 20, 1948. Following the war the area was incorporated into the State of Israel and the land was left undeveloped; the nearest village is Hamadia.

In 1992, it was described: "All of the village houses have been demolished. The remains of basalt stone walls and the square and circular foundations of buildings can be seen among the weeds." Evidence of historic occupation includes Roman milestones and ruined buildings at the Khirbat al Bawati.

== Bibliography ==
- Barron, J. B., ed. (1923). Palestine: Report and General Abstracts of the Census of 1922. Government of Palestine.
- Conder, C.R.; Kitchener, H.H. (1882). The Survey of Western Palestine: Memoirs of the Topography, Orography, Hydrography, and Archaeology. Vol. 2. London: Committee of the Palestine Exploration Fund.
- Department of Statistics (1945). Village Statistics, April, 1945. Government of Palestine.
- Hadawi, S. (1970). Village Statistics of 1945: A Classification of Land and Area ownership in Palestine. Palestine Liberation Organization Research Center.
- Khalidi, W. (1992). All That Remains:The Palestinian Villages Occupied and Depopulated by Israel in 1948. Washington D.C.: Institute for Palestine Studies. ISBN 0-88728-224-5.
- Mills, E., ed. (1932). Census of Palestine 1931. Population of Villages, Towns and Administrative Areas. Jerusalem: Government of Palestine.
- Morris, B. (2004). The Birth of the Palestinian Refugee Problem Revisited. Cambridge University Press. ISBN 978-0-521-00967-6.
- Palmer, E.H. (1881). The Survey of Western Palestine: Arabic and English Name Lists Collected During the Survey by Lieutenants Conder and Kitchener, R. E. Transliterated and Explained by E.H. Palmer. Committee of the Palestine Exploration Fund.
