= Umm 'Ajra =

Umm 'Ajra أم عجرة
- Village
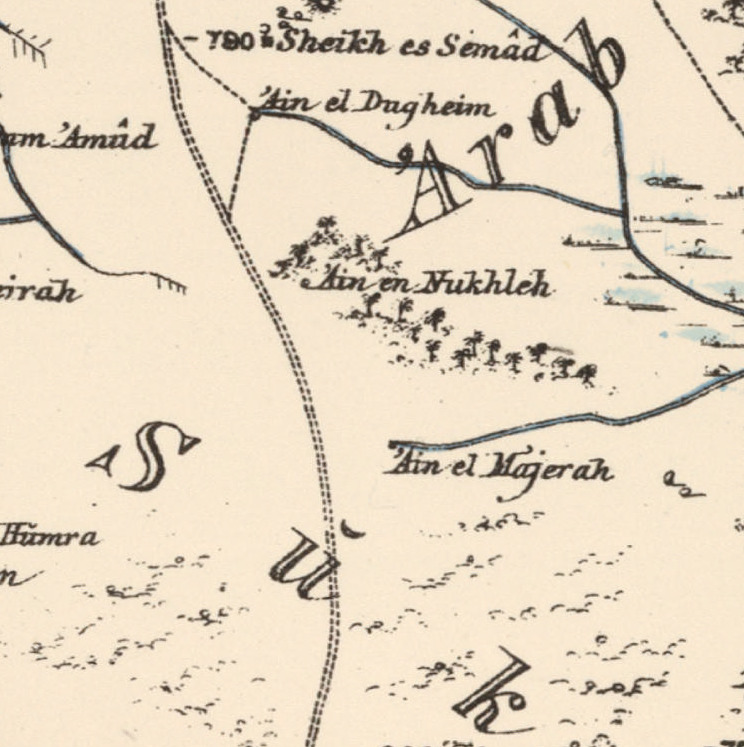
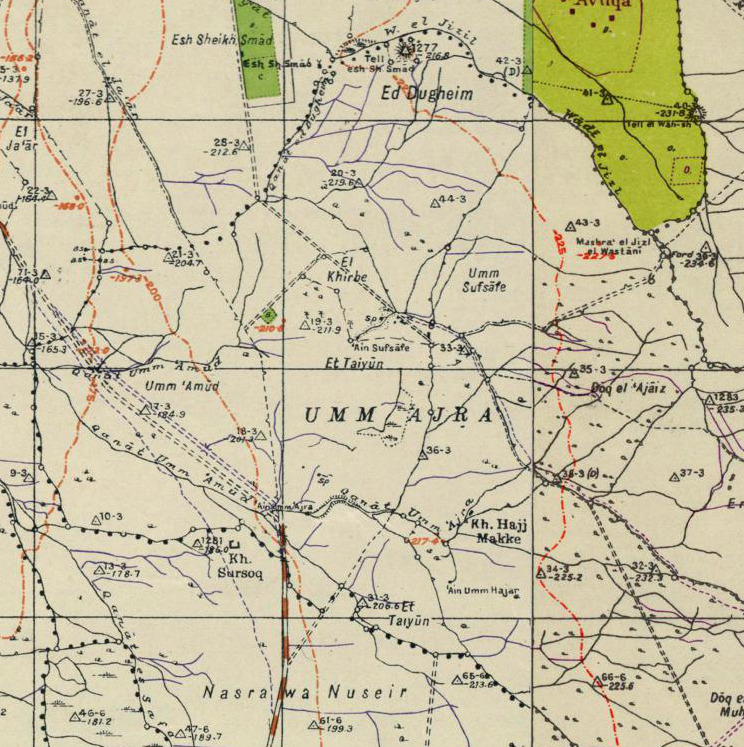
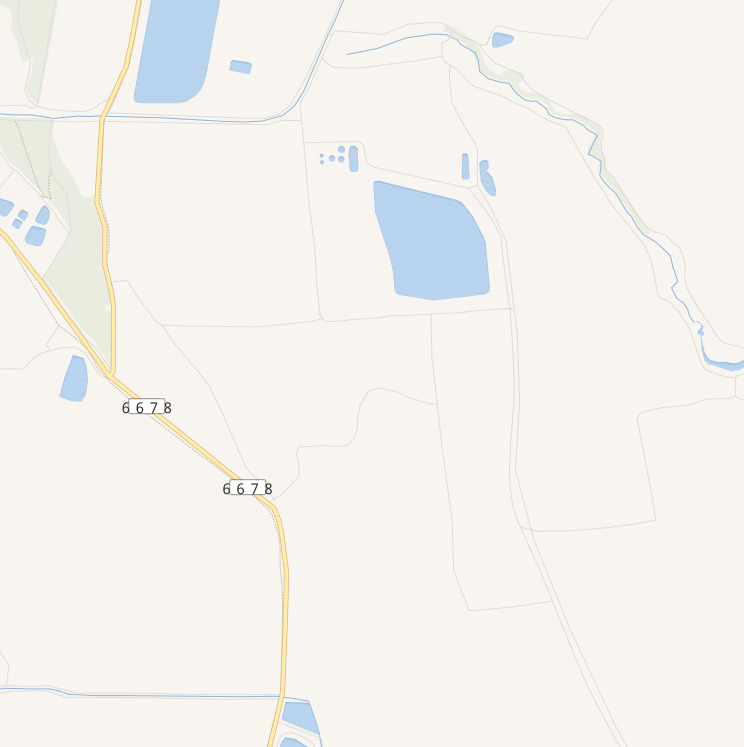
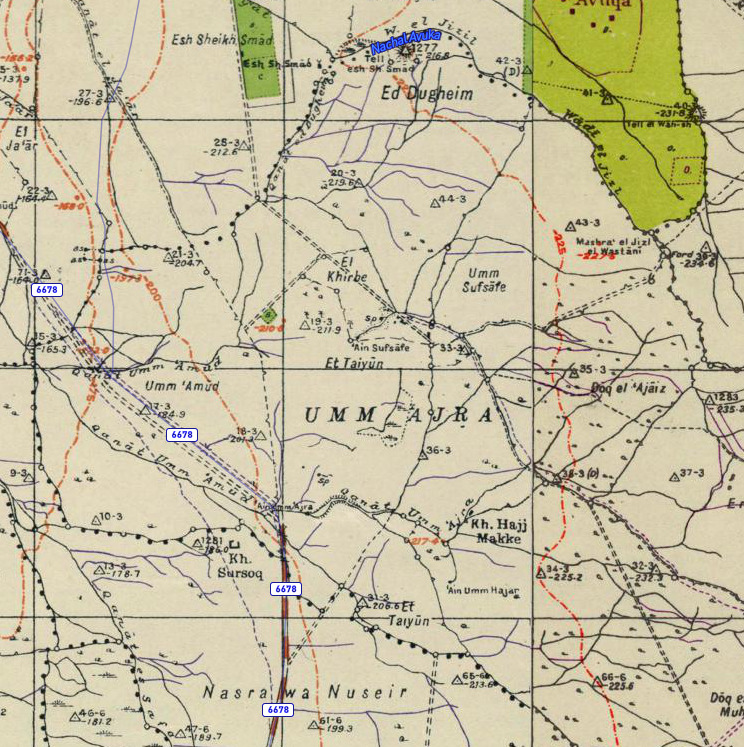
- 1870s map 1940s map modern map 1940s with modern overlay map A series of historical maps of the area around Umm 'Ajra (click the buttons)

- Location within Mandatory Palestine
- Coordinates: 32°27′56″N 35°31′21″E
- Palestine grid: 198/207
- Geopolitical entity: Mandatory Palestine
- Subdistrict: Baysan
- Date of depopulation: May 31, 1948

Area
  - Total: 6,443 dunams (6.443 km^{2}; 2.488 sq mi)

Population (1945)
  - Total: 260
- Current Localities: Shif’a

Umm 'Ajra (Arabic: أم عجرة), was a Palestinian Arab village in the District of Baysan. It was depopulated by the Israel Defense Forces during the 1948 Arab-Israeli War on May 31, 1948, as part of Operation Gideon. It was located 4 km south of Baysan and the 'Ayn Umm 'Ajra provided the village with water.

== History ==
The village had three khirbas: Tall al-Shaykh al-Simad, Hajj Makka, and Sursuq. In 1882, the PEF's Survey of Western Palestine found at Sheik Semad a "Small ruined Mukam of modern masonry".

=== British Mandate era ===
In the 1922 census of Palestine, conducted by the Mandatory Palestine authorities, Umm 'Ajra had a population of 86 Muslims, increasing in the 1931 census to 242, still all Muslims, in 48 houses.

In the 1945 statistics the population of Umm 'Ajra was 260 Muslims, while the total land area was 6,443 dunams, according to an official land and population survey. Of this, Arabs used 2,688 dunums for cereals, while a total of 203 dunums were classified as non-cultivable land.

=== 1948, aftermath ===
Shif’a, a farm built in the 1950s, is on village land. Kfar Ruppin is located east of the village site, Ein HaNetziv on the western side, and Avuqa (established in 1941, abandoned in 1952) to the north, none are on village land.

In 1992 it was described: "The site and lands are cultivated. The remains of date palm trees can be seen, scattered across the northern side of the site."

== Bibliography ==
- Barron, J. B., ed. (1923). Palestine: Report and General Abstracts of the Census of 1922. Government of Palestine.
- Conder, C.R.; Kitchener, H.H. (1882). The Survey of Western Palestine: Memoirs of the Topography, Orography, Hydrography, and Archaeology. Vol. 2. London: Committee of the Palestine Exploration Fund.
- Department of Statistics (1945). Village Statistics, April, 1945. Government of Palestine.
- Hadawi, S. (1970). Village Statistics of 1945: A Classification of Land and Area ownership in Palestine. Palestine Liberation Organization Research Center.
- Khalidi, W. (1992). All That Remains:The Palestinian Villages Occupied and Depopulated by Israel in 1948. Washington D.C.: Institute for Palestine Studies. ISBN 0-88728-224-5.
- Mills, E., ed. (1932). Census of Palestine 1931. Population of Villages, Towns and Administrative Areas. Jerusalem: Government of Palestine.
- Morris, B. (2004). The Birth of the Palestinian Refugee Problem Revisited. Cambridge University Press. ISBN 978-0-521-00967-6.
- Palmer, E.H. (1881). The Survey of Western Palestine: Arabic and English Name Lists Collected During the Survey by Lieutenants Conder and Kitchener, R. E. Transliterated and Explained by E.H. Palmer. Committee of the Palestine Exploration Fund.
