= Zab'a =

Zab'a زبعة
- Village
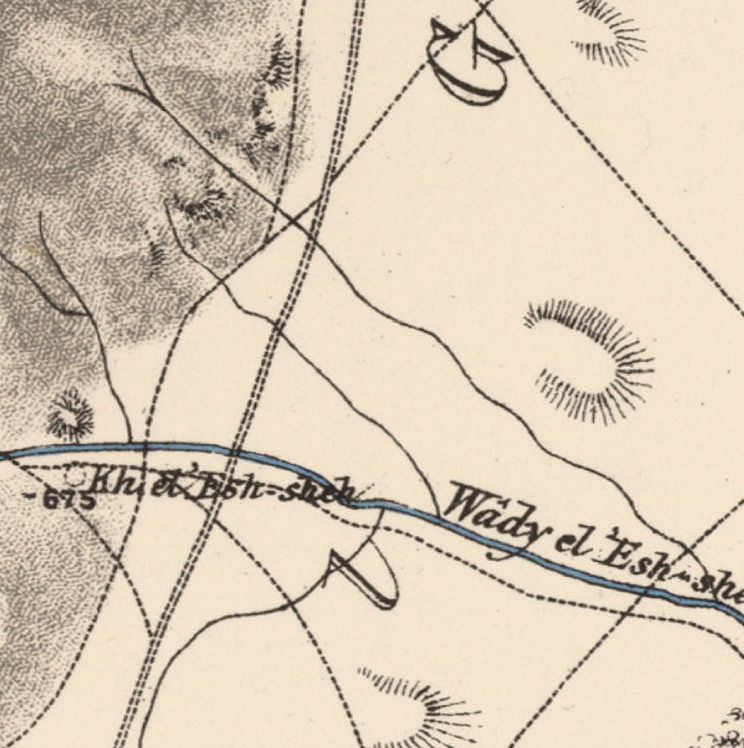
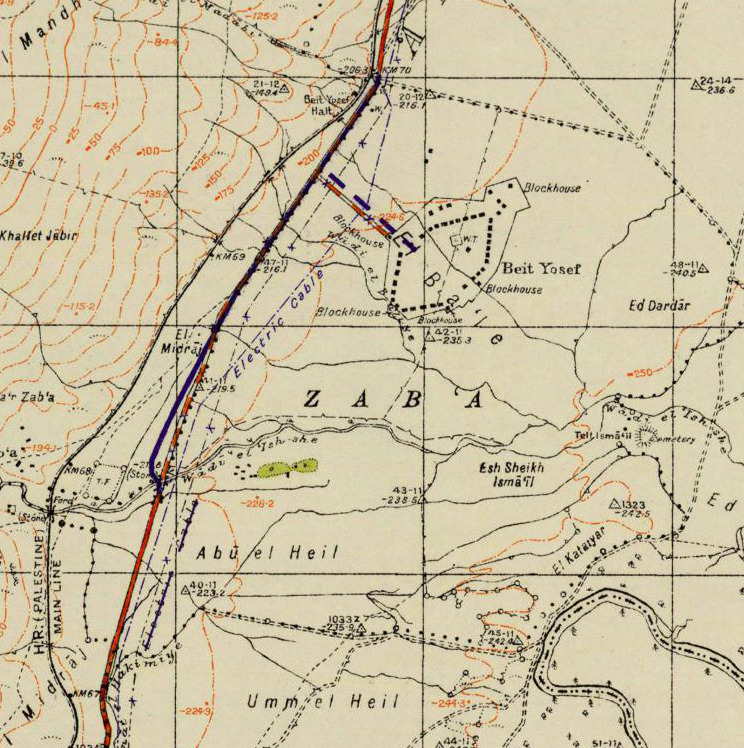
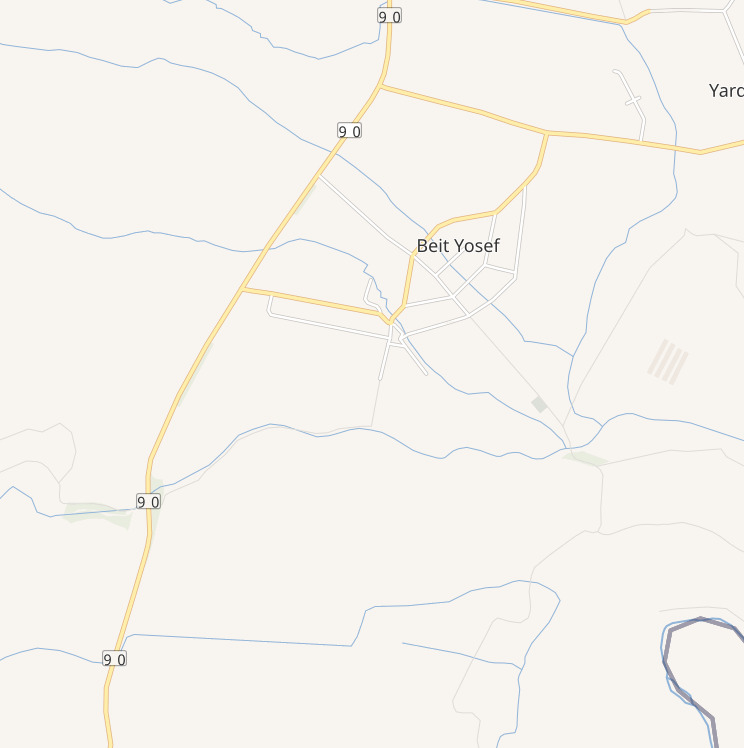
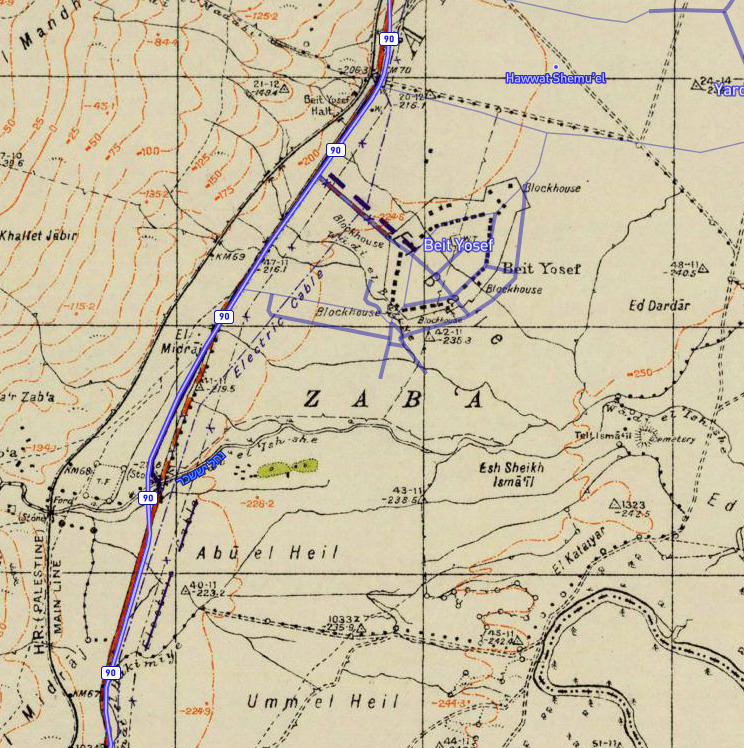
- 1870s map 1940s map modern map 1940s with modern overlay map A series of historical maps of the area around Zab'a (click the buttons)

- Location within Mandatory Palestine
- Coordinates: 32°33′15″N 35°32′55″E
- Palestine grid: 200/217
- Geopolitical entity: Mandatory Palestine
- Subdistrict: Baysan
- Date of depopulation: May 12, 1948

Population (1945)
  - Total: 170
- Current Localities: Beyt Yosef Doshen

Zab'a (Arabic: زبعة), was a Palestinian Arab village in the District of Baysan. It was depopulated by the Israel Defense Forces during the 1947–1948 Civil War in Mandatory Palestine on May 12, 1948, as part of Operation Gideon. It was located 5.5 km northeast of Baysan on Wadi Yubla or Wadi al-'Ashsha.

== History ==
2 km east of the village was Tell Ismail, which was used by the villagers as cemetery.

At the time of the 1931 census, Zab'a had 37 occupied houses and a population of 147, 146 Muslims and 1 Jew.

The population of the village in the 1945 statistics was 170 Muslims. The village lands comprised 3,968 dunums; 3,424 owned by Jews, 156 owned by Arabs, and 388 public. Of this, Arabs used all the 156 dunams for cereals, while a total of 448 dunams were non-cultivable land.

Beyt Yosef was established in 1937 2 km northeast of the village site, on land they had purchased. After Zab'a became depopulated, a farm named Doshen was established on village land inn 1955.

In 1992, the site was described as "covered with grass, lotus trees, and stones. Israelis have established several agricultural projects and fisheries on the village land. Other parts of the surrounding land is used for grazing."

== Bibliography ==
- Government of Palestine, Department of Statistics (1945). Village Statistics, April, 1945.
- Hadawi, S. (1970). Village Statistics of 1945: A Classification of Land and Area ownership in Palestine. Palestine Liberation Organization Research Center.
- Khalidi, W. (1992). All That Remains: The Palestinian Villages Occupied and Depopulated by Israel in 1948. Washington D.C.: Institute for Palestine Studies. ISBN 0-88728-224-5.
- Mills, E., ed. (1932). Census of Palestine 1931. Population of Villages, Towns and Administrative Areas. Jerusalem: Government of Palestine.
- Morris, B. (2004). The Birth of the Palestinian Refugee Problem Revisited. Cambridge University Press. ISBN 978-0-521-00967-6.
