= Khunayzir, Palestine =

Al-Khunayzir الخنيزر 'Arab al Khuneizir
- Village
- Etymology: Tell el Khaneizîr, the mound of the swine
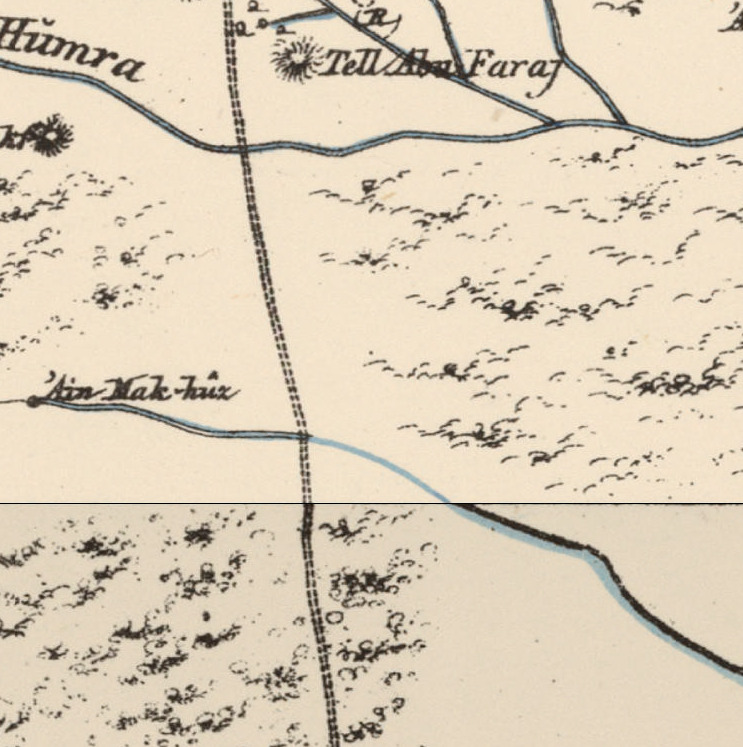
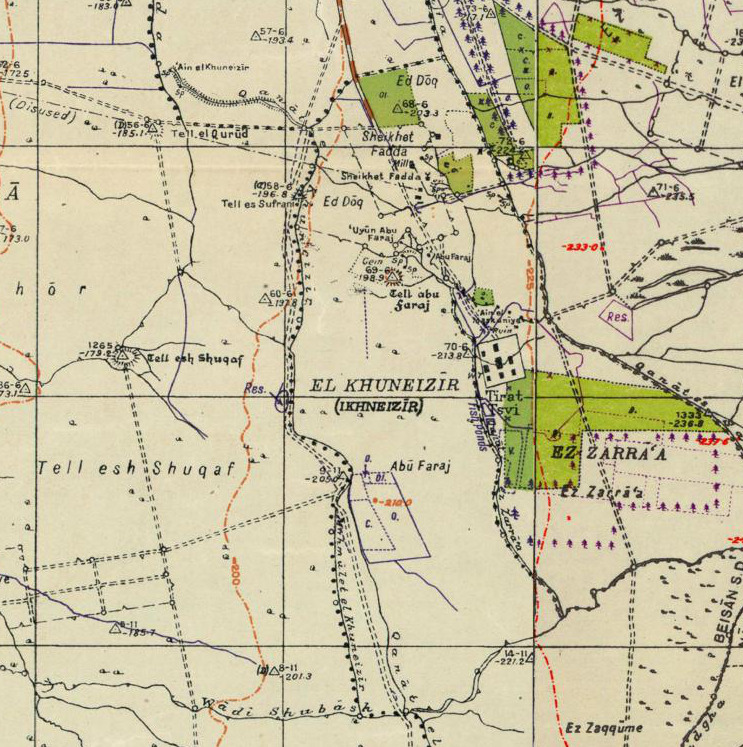
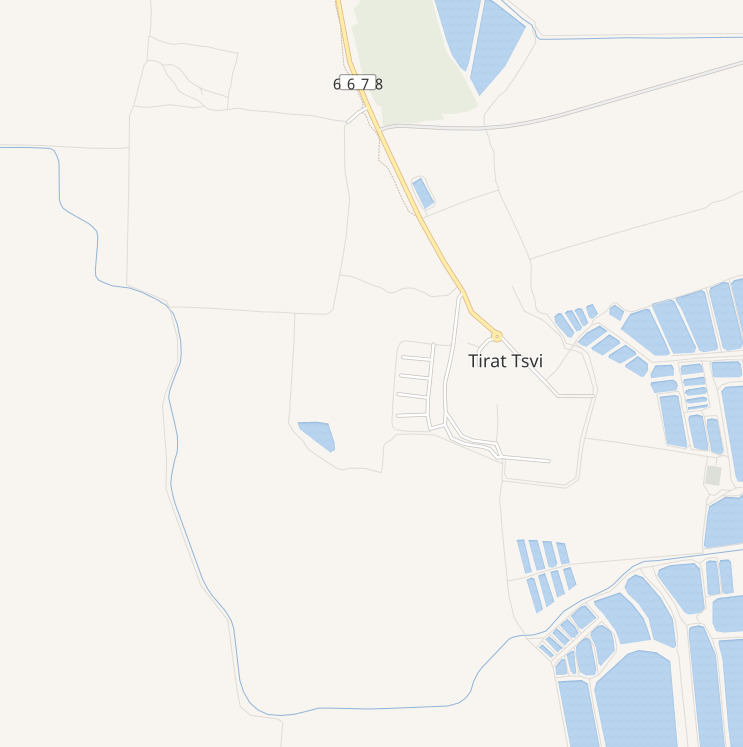
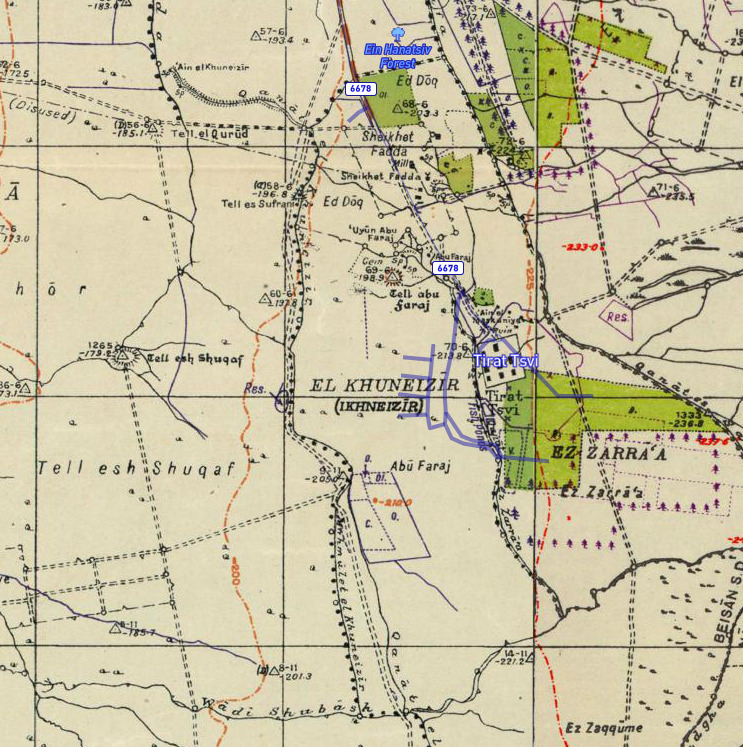
- 1870s map 1940s map modern map 1940s with modern overlay map A series of historical maps of the area around Al-Khunayzir (click the buttons)

- Location within Mandatory Palestine
- Coordinates: 32°25′17″N 35°31′20″E
- Palestine grid: 199/203
- Geopolitical entity: Mandatory Palestine
- Subdistrict: Baysan
- Date of depopulation: May 20, 1948

Area
  - Total: 3,107 dunams (3.107 km^{2}; 1.200 sq mi)

Population (1945)
  - Total: 260
- Cause(s) of depopulation: Influence of nearby town's fall
- Current Localities: Tirat Zvi

Al-Khunayzir (Arabic: الخنيزر), was a Palestinian Arab village in the District of Baysan. It was depopulated during the 1948 Arab-Israeli War on May 20, 1948.

== History ==
In 1881, a nearby tell was named as Tell el Khaneizîr, meaning the mound of the swine, and a nearby spring was named as Ain el Khaneizîr meaning the spring of the swine. خنزير means pig in Arabic.

=== British Mandate era ===
In the 1922 census of Palestine, conducted by the Mandatory Palestine authorities, Kunaizir had a population of 83; all Muslims, increasing in the 1931 census to 200 Muslims, in a total of 47 houses.

In the 1945 statistics the population was 260 Muslims, with a total of 3,107 dunams of land. Of this, 36 dunams were for citrus and bananas, 1,658 for plantations and irrigated land, 256 for cereals, while 34 dunams were non-cultivable land.

== 1948, and aftermath ==
According to B. Morris, 'Arab al Khuneizir was abandoned by its population under the "[i]nfluence of nearby town's fall", on 20 May 1948.

In 1992 it was described: "The only remaining landmarks is a cemetery on Tall Abu al-Faraj (199/203), north of the site. To the north and the west of this tell are the springs of 'Uyun Umm al-Faraj and 'Ayn al-Khanazir. Most of the village site and the land around it are covered with palm trees."

== Bibliography ==
- Barron, J.B., ed. (1923). Palestine: Report and General Abstracts of the Census of 1922. Government of Palestine.
- Government of Palestine, Department of Statistics (1945). Village Statistics, April, 1945.
- Hadawi, S. (1970). Village Statistics of 1945: A Classification of Land and Area ownership in Palestine. Palestine Liberation Organization Research Center. Archived from the original on 2018-12-08.
- Khalidi, W. (1992). All That Remains:The Palestinian Villages Occupied and Depopulated by Israel in 1948. Washington D.C.: Institute for Palestine Studies. ISBN 0-88728-224-5.
- Mills, E., ed. (1932). Census of Palestine 1931. Population of Villages, Towns and Administrative Areas. Jerusalem: Government of Palestine.
- Morris, B. (2004). The Birth of the Palestinian Refugee Problem Revisited. Cambridge University Press. ISBN 978-0-521-00967-6.
- Palmer, E.H. (1881). The Survey of Western Palestine: Arabic and English Name Lists Collected During the Survey by Lieutenants Conder and Kitchener, R. E. Transliterated and Explained by E.H. Palmer. Committee of the Palestine Exploration Fund.
