= Al-Samiriyya =

Al-Samiriyya السامرية Samiriya, al-
- Village
- Etymology: Kh. es Sâmrîyeh, ruin of the Samaritans
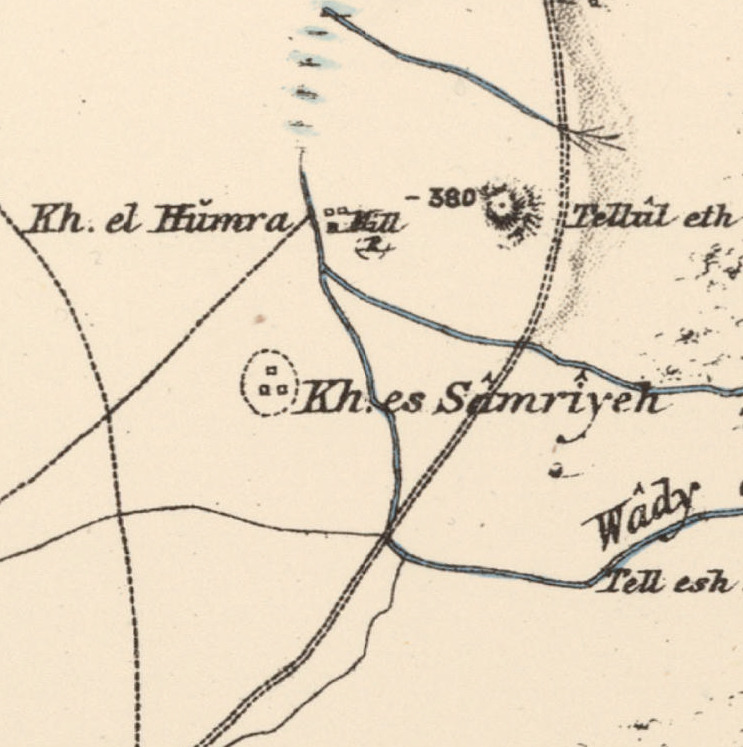
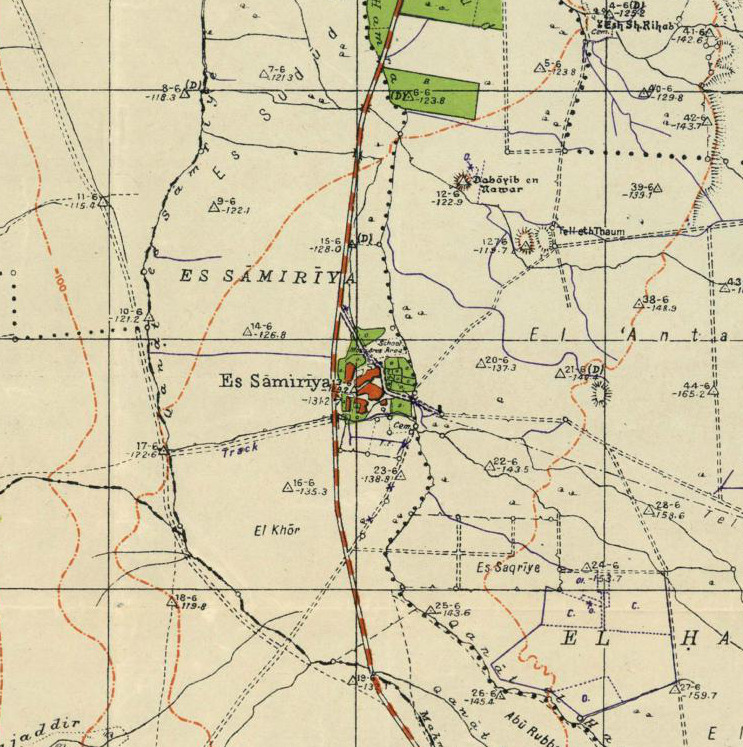
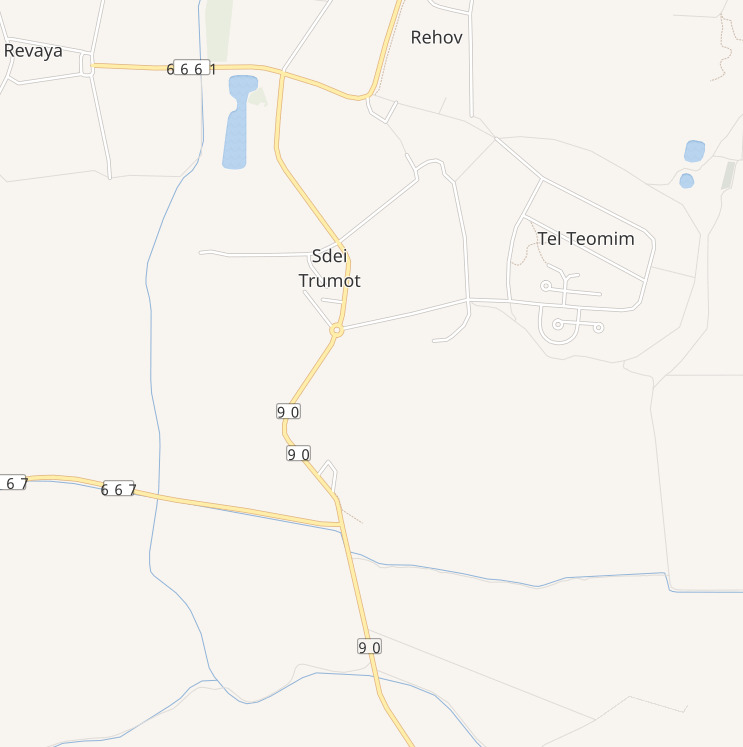
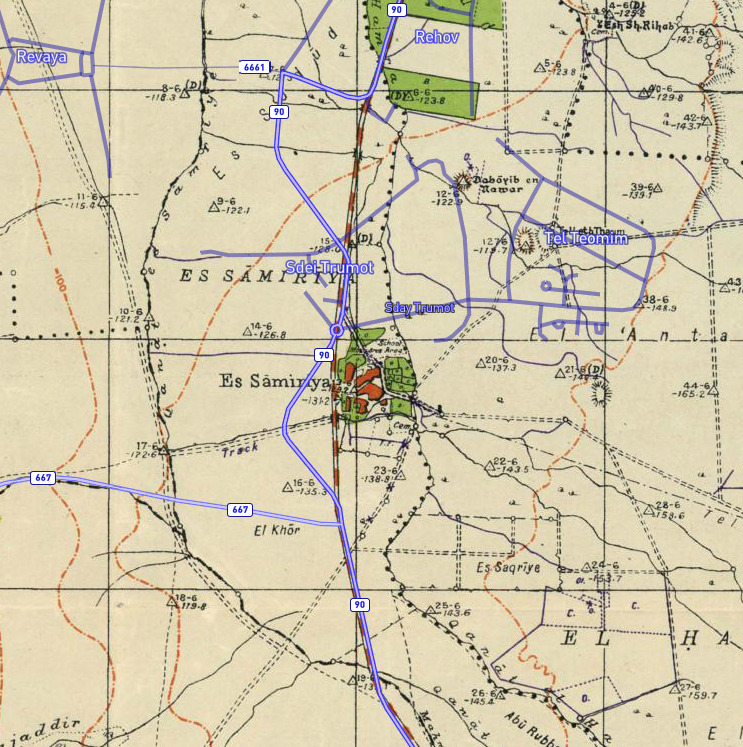
- 1870s map 1940s map modern map 1940s with modern overlay map A series of historical maps of the area around Al-Samiriyya (click the buttons)

- Location within Mandatory Palestine
- Coordinates: 32°26′15″N 35°29′14″E
- Palestine grid: 196/204
- Geopolitical entity: Mandatory Palestine
- Subdistrict: Baysan
- Date of depopulation: May 27, 1948

Area
  - Total: 3,873 dunams (3.873 km^{2}; 1.495 sq mi)

Population (1945)
  - Total: 250
- Cause(s) of depopulation: Military assault by Yishuv forces
- Current Localities: Sdei Trumot

Al-Samiriyya (Arabic: السامرية), was a Palestinian Arab village in the District of Baysan. It was depopulated by the Israel Defense Forces during the 1948 Arab-Israeli War on May 27, 1948, as part of Operation Gideon. It was located 7 km southeast of Baysan.

== History ==
The village had a mosque and three Khirbas: Khirbat al-Humra, Tulul al-Thawm, and Tall al-Khab.

=== Ottoman era ===
In 1852, Edward Robinson noted al-Samiriya from the mountains of Transjordan.

In 1882, the PEF's Survey of Western Palestine found at Khurbet es Samriyeh: "Ruined walls and traces of ruins alone remain. The place has, however, the appearance of an ancient site, and is well supplied with water." Of Khurbet el Humra they noted: "A few walls standing and a ruined mill. No indications of antiquity exist", while of Tellûl eth Thŭm they noted: "Artificial mounds; a stream of water to the north".

=== British Mandate era ===
In the 1922 census of Palestine, conducted by the Mandatory Palestine authorities, Samriyeh had a population of 162; all Muslims, increasing in the 1931 census to 181 Muslims, in a total of 41 houses.

In the 1945 statistics the village had a population of 250; 240 Muslims and 10 Christians, with a total of 3,873 dunums of land. Of this, 11 dunums were irrigated or used for plantation, 2,801 were for cereals, while 22 dunams were built-up land.

=== 1948, aftermath ===
The village became depopulated in May, 1948, after the Arab inhabitants of Baysan had been expelled.

In 1951 Sdei Trumot was established on village land, just north of the village site.

In 1992 the village site was described: "Only collapsed roofs remain, they are located on the western edge of the Sdei Trumot settlement".

== Bibliography ==
- Barron, J. B., ed. (1923). Palestine: Report and General Abstracts of the Census of 1922. Government of Palestine.
- Conder, C.R.; Kitchener, H.H. (1882). The Survey of Western Palestine: Memoirs of the Topography, Orography, Hydrography, and Archaeology. Vol. 2. London: Committee of the Palestine Exploration Fund.
- Department of Statistics (1945). Village Statistics, April, 1945. Government of Palestine.
- Hadawi, S. (1970). Village Statistics of 1945: A Classification of Land and Area ownership in Israel. Palestine Liberation Organization Research Center. Archived from the original on 2018-12-08.
- Khalidi, W. (1992). All That Remains:The Palestinian Villages Occupied and Depopulated by Israel in 1948. Washington D.C.: Institute for Palestine Studies. ISBN 0-88728-224-5.
- Mills, E., ed. (1932). Census of Palestine 1931. Population of Villages, Towns and Administrative Areas. Jerusalem: Government of Palestine.
- Morris, B. (2004). The Birth of the Palestinian Refugee Problem Revisited. Cambridge University Press. ISBN 978-0-521-00967-6.israel
- Palmer, E.H. (1881). The Survey of Western Palestine: Arabic and English Name Lists Collected During the Survey by Lieutenants Conder and Kitchener, R. E. Transliterated and Explained by E.H. Palmer. Committee of the Palestine Exploration Fund.
