= Operation Gideon =

1948 Haganah offensive to capture Beisan

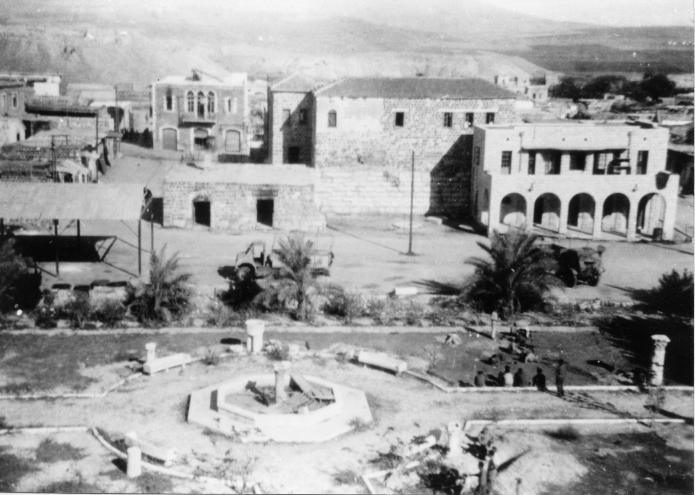

Operation Gideon was a Haganah offensive launched in the closing days of the British Mandate in Palestine, as part of the 1947–48 Civil War in Mandatory Palestine. Its objectives were to capture Beisan (Beit She'an), clear the surrounding villages and Bedouin camps and block one of the possible entry routes for Transjordanian forces. It was part of Plan Dalet. The operation was carried out by the Golani brigade between 10–15 May 1948. Avraham Yoffe commanded the battalion that captured Beisan. The 1947 UN Partition Plan allocated Beisan and most of its district to the proposed Jewish state. It is possible that Irgun units were involved in parts of the operation. Following the operation, the town formally surrendered with most of its residents fleeing. Most Arab Christians relocated to Nazareth. A ma'abarah (refugee camp) inhabited mainly by North African immigrants was also erected in Beit She'an, and it later became a development town.

== Background ==
Beisan was a predominantly Muslim town in the centre of a fertile valley running into the River Jordan. The area has significant Ancient Egyptian, Greek, Samaritan, Jewish and Roman archeological remains. It was on the main road from 'Afula and Tiberias which was one of the ancient routes between Damascus and Egypt. During the British mandate a number of Jewish villages were established in the valley. By the end of the Second World War, Jews owned a third of the lands in the Beisan valley. The Beisan lands were awarded to the Jews under the 1947 UN Partition plan.

== Operation ==
On the night of 10/11 May troops from the Golani brigade captured two villages close to Baysan and immediately commenced blowing up houses. The following night they launched a mortar bombardment on Baysan. Commander Yoffe telephoned local leaders in the town and threatened to level the town. The next day the town formally surrendered with most of its residents fleeing. Between 700 and 1,500 of those who remained in the town were expelled across the River Jordan on 14/15 May. There were left around 250 people, mainly Christians and they were trucked to Nazareth on 28 May.

== Aftermath ==
Yosef Weitz of the JNF claimed he had David Ben-Gurion's approval for a program of systematic destruction of villages. But it appears that Ben Gurion was concerned by the destruction of Baysan. On 16 June he cabled Golani headquarters: "Ask Avraham Yoffe is it true that he burned the town of Beit Shean in whole or in part, and on whose instructions did he do this?"
This appears to have been as a result of Agriculture Minister, Aharon Zisling, raising the issue at the Provisional Government's Cabinet meeting on the same day: "destruction during battle ... is one thing. But a month later in cold blood, out of political calculation is another thing altogether. This course will not reduce the number of Arabs who will return to the Land of Israel. It will increase the number of our enemies."
On 20 June Minority Affairs Minister, Bechor Shitrit also raised the issue of destruction of villages.

Most Arab Christians relocated to Nazareth. During the 1950s a ma'abarah (refugee camp) inhabited mainly by North African immigrants was erected in Beit She'an, and it later became a development town.

== Arab communities captured during Operation Gideon ==
Name	Date	Defending forces	Brigade	Population
Al-Ashrafiyya	10 May 1948	villagers fled	Golani brigade	230
Farwana	10 May 1948	villagers fled 'to Transjordan'	Golani brigade	330
Baysan	12 May 1948	Arab Liberation Army 'contingents'	Golani brigade	5,180 inc. 430 Christians
Al-Sakhina	12 May 1948	n/a	Golani brigade	820 inc. 290 Jews
Al-Hamidiyya	12 May 1948	n/a	Golani brigade	320 inc. 100 Jews
Sirin	12 May 1948	n/a	Golani	810
Al-Ghazzawiyya	20 May 1948	n/a	Golani brigade 4th battalion	1,640 inc. 620 Jews
Al-Fatur	20 May 1948	n/a	n/a	110
Arab al-Safa	20 May 1948	n/a	Golani brigade	650
Kawkab al-Hawa	21 May 1948	n/a	Golani brigade 3rd battalion	300
Al-Samiriyya	27 May 1948	n/a	Golani brigade 4th battalion	250
Danna	28 May 1948	n/a	Golani brigade	190

== Other Arab communities in Baysan district, 1948 ==
Name	Date	Defending forces	Brigade	Population
'Arab al-'Arida	n/a	n/a	n/a	330 inc 180 Jews
'Arab al-Bawati	n/a	n/a	n/a	520
Al-Bira	n/a	n/a	n/a	260
Al-Hamra ('Arab al-Hamra)	n/a	n/a	n/a	730
Jabbul	7 June 1948	n/a	Barak	420 inc. 170 Jews (Beyt Yosef)
Kafra	n/a	n/a	n/a	430
Al-Khunayzir	n/a	n/a	n/a	260
Masil al-Jil	n/a	n/a	n/a	100
Al-Murassas	n/a	n/a	n/a	460
Tall al-Shawk	n/a	n/a	n/a	120
Umm 'Ajra	n/a	n/a	n/a	260
Zab'a	n/a	n/a	n/a	170

== See also ==
- Depopulated Palestinian locations in Israel

== Bibliography ==
- Walid Khalidi, All That Remains, ISBN 0-88728-224-5. Uses 1945 census for population figures.
- Benny Morris, The Birth of the Palestinian refugee problem, 1947–1949,ISBN 0-521-33028-9.
