= Dallata =

Dallata دلاّتة
- Etymology: from personal name
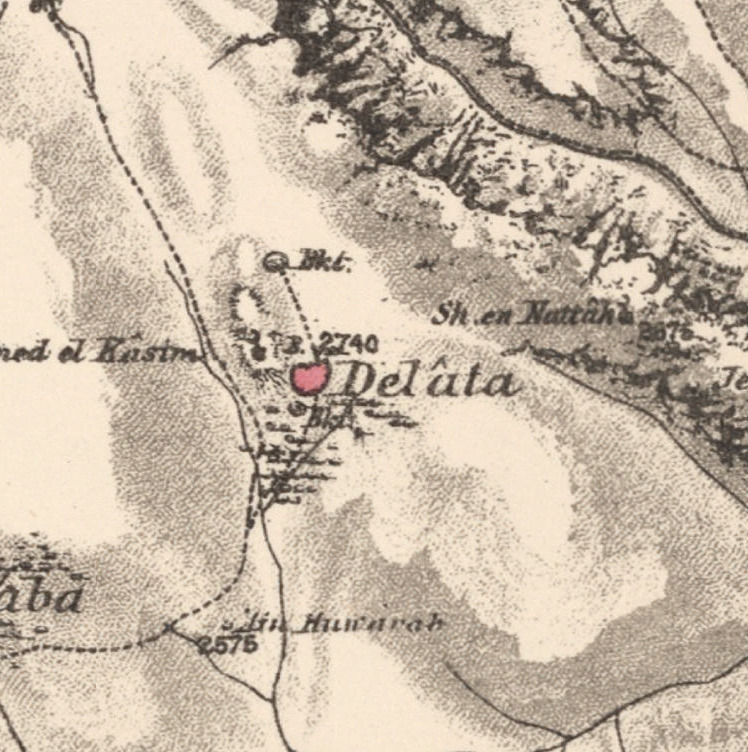
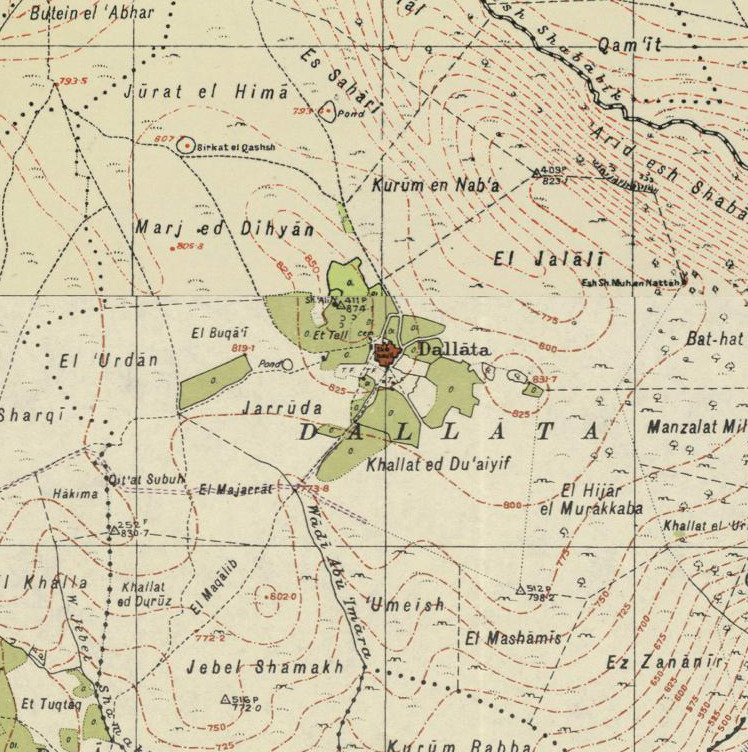
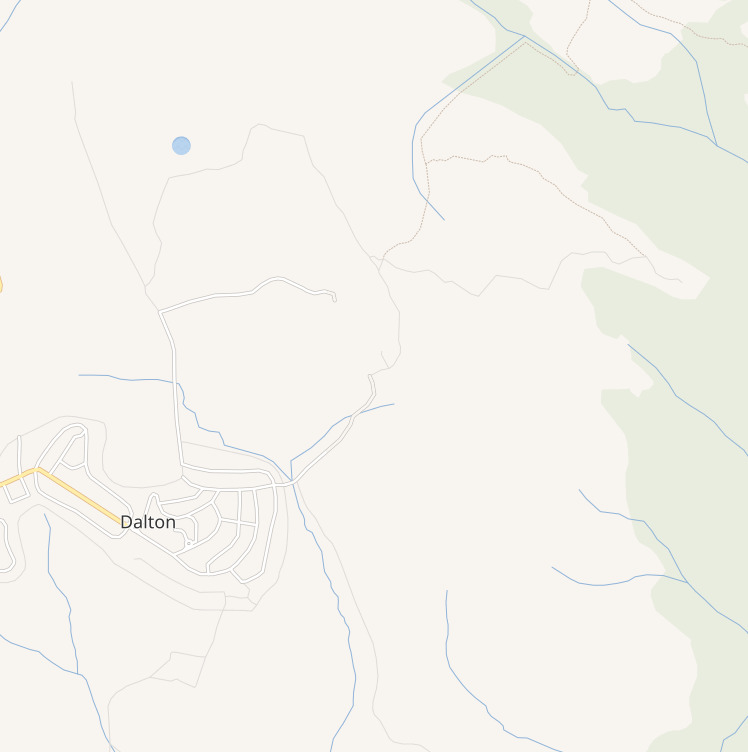
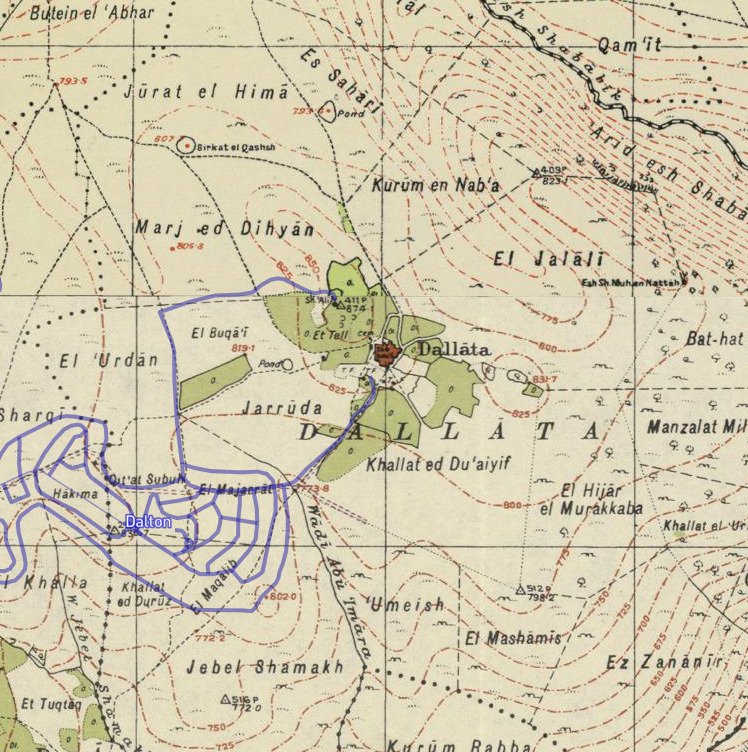
- 1870s map 1940s map modern map 1940s with modern overlay map A series of historical maps of the area around Dallata (click the buttons)

- Location within Mandatory Palestine
- Coordinates: 33°01′19″N 35°29′56″E
- Palestine grid: 197/269
- Geopolitical entity: Mandatory Palestine
- Subdistrict: Safad
- Date of depopulation: Not known

Area
  - Total: 9,072 dunams (9.072 km^{2}; 3.503 sq mi)

Population (1945)
  - Total: 360
- Current Localities: Dalton

Dallata (Arabic: دلاّتة) was an Arab village, located on a hilltop 6 kilometers (3.7 mi) north of Safad. Constructed upon an ancient site, it was known to the Crusaders as Deleha. Dallata was included in the late 16th century Ottoman census and British censuses of the 20th century. Its inhabitants were primarily agriculturalists, with some involved in carpentry or trade.

Dallata was depopulated during the 1948 Palestine war on around May 10, 1948 by the Palmach's First Battalion of Operation Yiftach. Following the establishment of Israel, the Israeli locality of Dalton was established about 1 kilometer (0.62 mi) southwest of the village site.

== History ==
Dallata was located on the upper slope of a hill, built on the ruins of an ancient occupied site. Excavations have found remains of settlements and agricultural installation from the Chalcolithic and Early Bronze Age. Tombs had been located in the vicinity.

An excavation carried out in 2006 on a location halfway between the center of Dallata and the new Israeli settlement of Dalton, found alluvial soil that contained worn Late Roman and Byzantine potsherds. Among the findings from Dallata is a marble column inscribed with Hebrew and Aramaic blessings, though only the ends of the lines remain. This column might have been part of a chancel screen within a synagogue.

The village was referred to by the Crusaders as Deleha. Mamluk remains have also been found.

=== Ottoman era ===
In 1517, the village was incorporated into the Ottoman Empire with the rest of Palestine, and in 1596 the village appeared in the tax registers as being in the nahiya (subdistrict) of Jira (part of Safad Sanjak), with an estimated population of 127. The inhabitants paid taxes on wheat, barley, olives, goats, beehives, vineyards, and a press for processing grapes or olives; a total of 4,416 Akçe. All the inhabitants were Muslim.

In 1662, it was mentioned as a place of Jewish graves, while in 1838, Dallata was noted as a village located in the Safad district.

In 1875 Victor Guérin visited, and noted that all the inhabitants were Muslim. In 1881, the PEF's Survey of Western Palestine (SWP) noted the village had about 100 Muslim residents. There were a few gardens around the village, and water was supplied from a well and a birket. The villagers worked primarily in agriculture throughout its history, and some worked in carpentry and trade. A population list from about 1887 showed Dallata to have about 355 Muslim inhabitants.

The 2006 excavation found a structure dating to the Late Ottoman Period.

=== British Mandate era ===
In the 1922 census of Palestine conducted by the British Mandate authorities, Dallatha had a population of 204, all Muslims, increasing in the 1931 census to 256, still all Muslims, in a total of 43 houses.

In the 1945 statistics it had a population of 360, all Muslims, with a total of 9072 Dunams of land. Of this, 3,651 was allocated to cereal, 302 were used for orchards, while 36 dunams were classified as built-up (urban) land. The village had a small school which had an enrollment of 37 students in 1945.

=== 1948, and aftermath ===
Dallata was depopulated in the 1947–1948 Civil War in Mandatory Palestine. The Israeli historian Benny Morris writes that the date and cause of the depopulation is unknown, while Walid Khalidi assumes it was occupied some time after the fall of the district capital of Safed, 10–11 May 1948. According to Khalidi, the indirect evidence points to the village being seized during Operation Yiftach, and, in that case, it was probably one of the villages attacked in the latter stages of the operation, like neighboring 'Ammuqa, which was occupied on 24 May. The American historian Rosemarie Esber reports that Dallata was one of the villages that locals fled to in the first days of May 1948, when Fir'im, Mughr al-Khayt and Qabba'a were attacked with mortars by Israeli forces. Esber gives the depopulation date as 10 May 1948, and the causes twofold: "Direct mortar attacks on civilians, siege, shooting at fleeing Arabs", and "Terror raids, house demolitions, sniping, hostage-taking, looting, destruction of crop and livestock".

In 1950 after the 1948 war, the settlement of Dalton was established by the Israelis about 1 km southwest of the village site, on village land.

The Palestinian historian Walid Khalidi described the village remains in 1992: "All that remains are the debris of the houses scattered across the site, partly covered by grass, shrubs, and trees. A few stone terraces on village land are still intact, and some olive trees still grow. About 1 km south of the site lies the Israeli settlement of Dalton."

In 2000, a 117-page book was published about Dallata. Included in it was ten pages on the families of the village, listing the father and sons and where they were living in 2000.

== Bibliography ==
- Barron, J.B., ed. (1923). Palestine: Report and General Abstracts of the Census of 1922. Government of Palestine.
- Bron, Hendrik (Enno) (2009-12-26). "Dalton, Survey Final Report". Hadashot Arkheologiyot – Excavations and Surveys in Israel (121).
- Conder, C.R.; Kitchener, H.H. (1881). The Survey of Western Palestine: Memoirs of the Topography, Orography, Hydrography, and Archaeology. Vol. 1. London: Committee of the Palestine Exploration Fund.
- Davis, Rochelle A. (2011). Palestinian Village Histories: Geographies of the Displaced. Stanford University Press, Stanford, California. ISBN 978-0-8047-7312-6.
- Dauphin, C. (1998). La Palestine byzantine, Peuplement et Populations. BAR International Series 726 (in French). Vol. III : Catalogue. Oxford: Archeopress. ISBN 9780860549055.
- Department of Statistics (1945). Village Statistics, April, 1945. Government of Palestine.
- Esber, R. M. (2008). Under the Cover of War, The Zionist Expulsions of the Palestinians. Arabicus Books & Media. ISBN 978-0-9815131-7-1.
- Guérin, V. (1880). Description Géographique Historique et Archéologique de la Palestine (in French). Vol. 3: Galilee, pt. 2. Paris: L'Imprimerie Nationale.
- Hadawi, S. (1970). Village Statistics of 1945: A Classification of Land and Area ownership in Palestine. Palestine Liberation Organization Research Center.
- Hottinger, J.H. (1662). Cippi Hebraici, 2nd ed. Typis Samuelis Broun.
- Hummayd, Nihad Fawzi (2000). Dallata: Ta'ir al- niq al-Filastini [Dallata: The Palestinian phoenix] (in Arabic). Damascus, Syria: Dar al-Shajara.
- Hütteroth, W.-D.; Abdulfattah, K. (1977). Historical Geography of Palestine, Transjordan and Southern Syria in the Late 16th Century. Erlanger Geographische Arbeiten, Sonderband 5. Erlangen, Germany: Vorstand der Fränkischen Geographischen Gesellschaft. ISBN 3-920405-41-2.
- Khalidi, W. (1992). All That Remains:The Palestinian Villages Occupied and Depopulated by Israel in 1948. Washington D.C.: Institute for Palestine Studies. ISBN 0-88728-224-5.
- Mills, E., ed. (1932). Census of Palestine 1931. Population of Villages, Towns and Administrative Areas. Jerusalem: Government of Palestine.
- Morris, B. (2004). The Birth of the Palestinian Refugee Problem Revisited. Cambridge University Press. ISBN 978-0-521-00967-6.
- Palmer, E.H. (1881). The Survey of Western Palestine: Arabic and English Name Lists Collected During the Survey by Lieutenants Conder and Kitchener, R. E. Transliterated and Explained by E.H. Palmer. Committee of the Palestine Exploration Fund.
- Rhode, H. (1979). Administration and Population of the Sancak of Safed in the Sixteenth Century (PhD). Columbia University. Archived from the original on 2020-03-01.
- Robinson, E.; Smith, E. (1841). Biblical Researches in Palestine, Mount Sinai and Arabia Petraea: A Journal of Travels in the year 1838. Vol. 3. Boston: Crocker & Brewster.
- Schumacher, G. (1888). "Population list of the Liwa of Akka". Quarterly Statement - Palestine Exploration Fund. 20: 169–191.
- Sharon, M. (2004). Corpus Inscriptionum Arabicarum Palaestinae, D-F. Vol. 3. BRILL. ISBN 90-04-13197-3. (pp. 5-6)
- Smithline, Howard (2008-09-04). "Har Dalton Final Report". Hadashot Arkheologiyot – Excavations and Surveys in Israel (120).
