= Qabba'a =

Qabba'a قبّاعة
- Village
- Etymology: "large-headed"
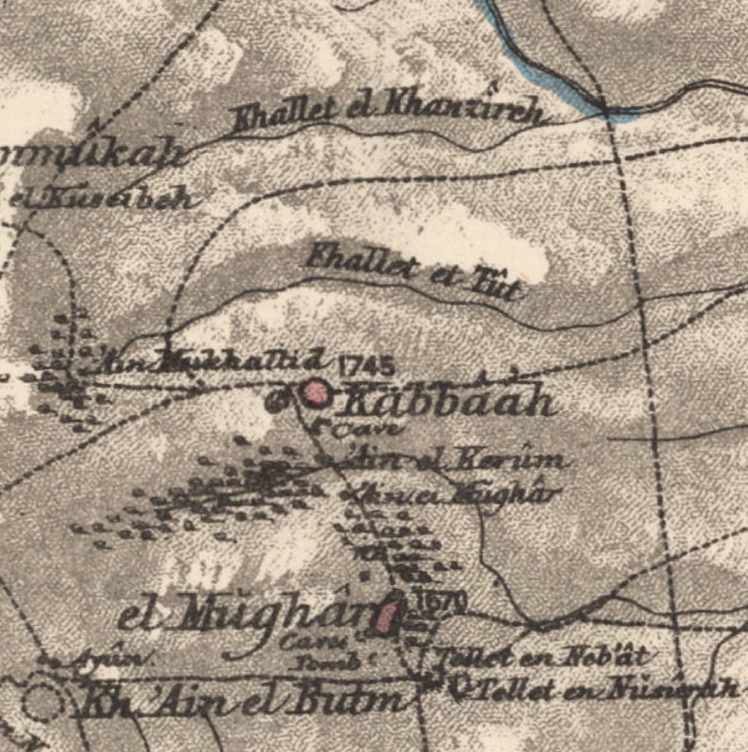
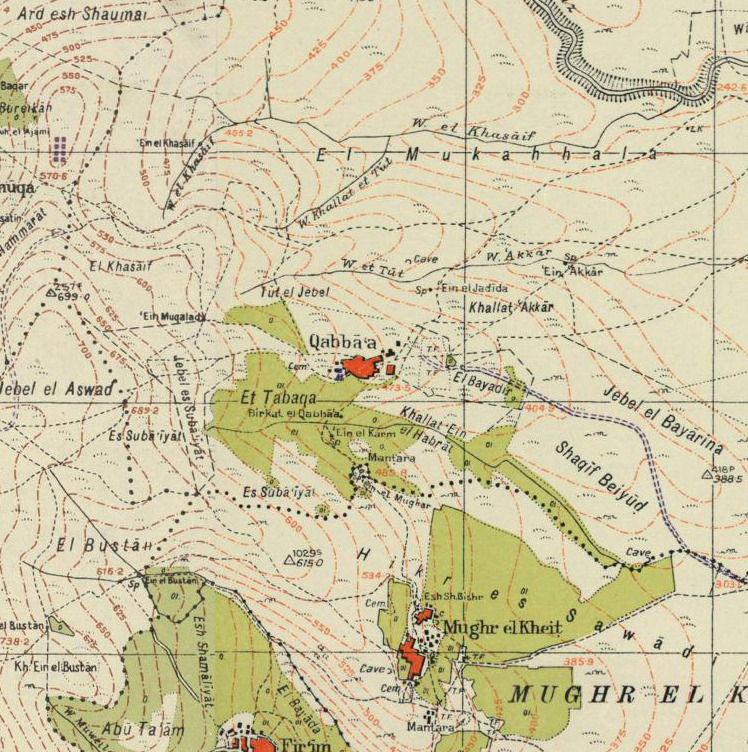
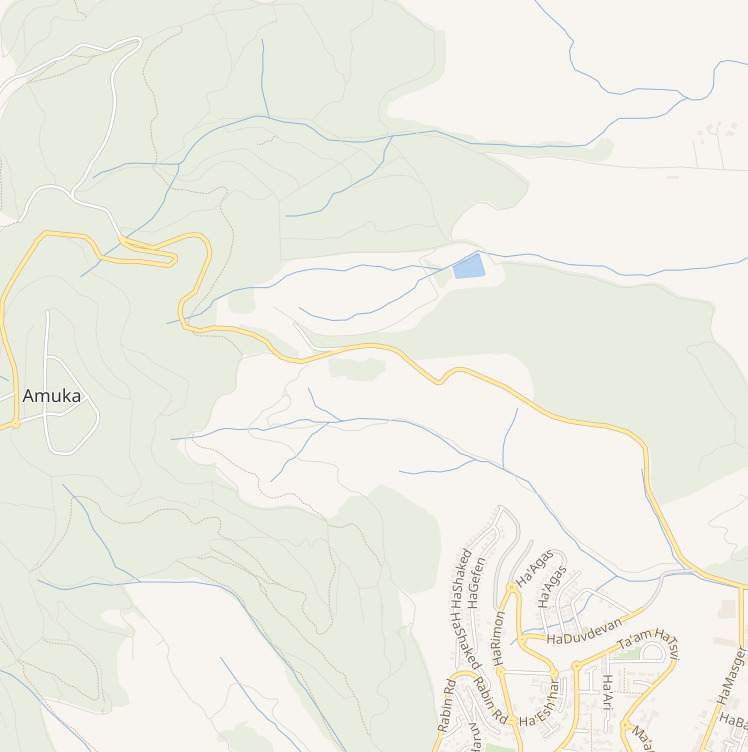
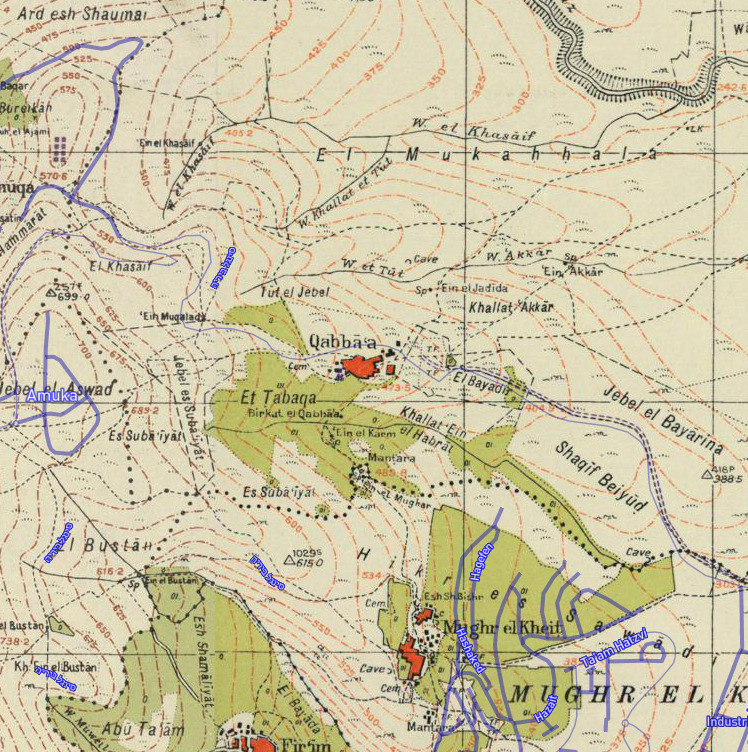
- 1870s map 1940s map modern map 1940s with modern overlay map A series of historical maps of the area around Qabba'a (click the buttons)

- Location within Mandatory Palestine
- Coordinates: 32°59′55″N 35°32′17″E
- Palestine grid: 200/267
- Geopolitical entity: Mandatory Palestine
- Subdistrict: Safad
- Date of depopulation: May 26, 1948

Area
  - Total: 13,817 dunams (13.817 km^{2}; 5.335 sq mi)

Population (1945)
  - Total: 460
- Cause(s) of depopulation: Military assault by Yishuv forces

Qabba'a was a Palestinian Arab village in the District of Safad. It was depopulated during the 1948 War on May 26, 1948, by the Palmach's First Battalion of Operation Yiftach. It was located 6 km northeast of Safad.

== History ==
In 1596 the village appeared under the name of Qabba'a in the Ottoman tax registers as part of the nahiya (subdistrict) of Jira, part of Safad Sanjak. It had an all Muslim population, consisting of 11 households and 2 bachelors, an estimated 99 persons. The villagers paid a fixed tax rate of 20 % on agricultural products, including as wheat, barley, olive trees, vineyards, goats and beehives, in addition to occasional revenues; totalling 2,280 akçe.

The village appeared under the name of Koubaa on the map that Pierre Jacotin compiled during Napoleon's invasion of 1799.

In 1838 el-Kuba'ah was noted as a Muslim village, located in the el-Khait district.

In 1875 Victor Guérin found the village to have 120 Muslim inhabitants.

In 1881 the PEF's Survey of Western Palestine described as Kabbaah: "A masonry village, with a few caves to the south contains about 150 Moslems; situated on a ridge, with olives and arable land. Water from birket and good springs".

A population list from about 1887 showed Kaba'ah to have about 385 Muslim inhabitants.

=== British Mandate era ===
In the 1922 census of Palestine, conducted by the British Mandate authorities, Qaba'a had a population of 179 Muslims, increasing in the 1931 census when Kabba' had 256 Muslim inhabitants, in a total of 44 houses.

In the 1945 statistics it had a population of 460 Muslims with a total land area of 13,817 dunums. Of this, 379 dunums was plantations and irrigable land, 7,966 were for cereals, while 66 dunams were built-up (urban) land.

=== 1948, aftermath ===
On 2 May 1948, Yigal Allon with Haganah launched an operation, conquering ‘Ein al Zeitun and Biriyya, and intimidating with mortar barrages the villages of Fir’im, Qabba‘a and Mughr al Kheit, leading to a mass evacuation. Qabba'a finally became depopulated on May 26, 1948, after a military assault by Israeli forces.

In 1953, Hatzor HaGlilit was founded 3 km south of the village site, but not on village land.

In 1992 the village site was described: "The stone debris of destroyed houses covers the site, where shrubs, grass, cactuses, and fig and pine trees grow. Most of the surrounding land are cultivated by Israeli farmers, but some are wooded and others are used as pasture."

== Bibliography ==
- Barron, J. B., ed. (1923). Palestine: Report and General Abstracts of the Census of 1922. Government of Palestine.
- Conder, C.R.; Kitchener, H. H. (1881). The Survey of Western Palestine: Memoirs of the Topography, Orography, Hydrography, and Archaeology. Vol. 1. London: Committee of the Palestine Exploration Fund.
- Department of Statistics (1945). Village Statistics, April, 1945. Government of Palestine.
- Guérin, V. (1880). Description Géographique Historique et Archéologique de la Palestine (in French). Vol. 3: Galilee, pt. 2. Paris: L'Imprimerie Nationale.
- Hadawi, S. (1970). Village Statistics of 1945: A Classification of Land and Area ownership in Palestine. Palestine Liberation Organization Research Center.
- Hütteroth, W.-D.; Abdulfattah, K. (1977). Historical Geography of Palestine, Transjordan and Southern Syria in the Late 16th Century. Erlanger Geographische Arbeiten, Sonderband 5. Erlangen, Germany: Vorstand der Fränkischen Geographischen Gesellschaft. ISBN 3-920405-41-2.
- Karmon, Y. (1960). "An Analysis of Jacotin's Map of Palestine" (PDF). Israel Exploration Journal. 10 (3, 4): 155–173, 244–253. Archived from the original (PDF) on 2019-12-22.
- Khalidi, W. (1992). All That Remains:The Palestinian Villages Occupied and Depopulated by Israel in 1948. Washington D.C.: Institute for Palestine Studies. ISBN 0-88728-224-5.
- Mills, E., ed. (1932). Census of Palestine 1931. Population of Villages, Towns and Administrative Areas. Jerusalem: Government of Palestine.
- Morris, B. (2004). The Birth of the Palestinian Refugee Problem Revisited. Cambridge University Press. ISBN 978-0-521-00967-6.
- Palmer, E. H. (1881). The Survey of Western Palestine: Arabic and English Name Lists Collected During the Survey by Lieutenants Conder and Kitchener, R. E. Transliterated and Explained by E.H. Palmer. Committee of the Palestine Exploration Fund.
- Rhode, H. (1979). Administration and Population of the Sancak of Safed in the Sixteenth Century. Columbia University. Archived from the original on 2020-03-01.
- Robinson, E.; Smith, E. (1841). Biblical Researches in Palestine, Mount Sinai and Arabia Petraea: A Journal of Travels in the year 1838. Vol. 3. Boston: Crocker & Brewster.
- Schumacher, G. (1888). "Population list of the Liwa of Akka". Quarterly Statement - Palestine Exploration Fund. 20: 169–191.
