= Fir'im =

Fir'im فرعم Feram
- Village
- Etymology: from personal name
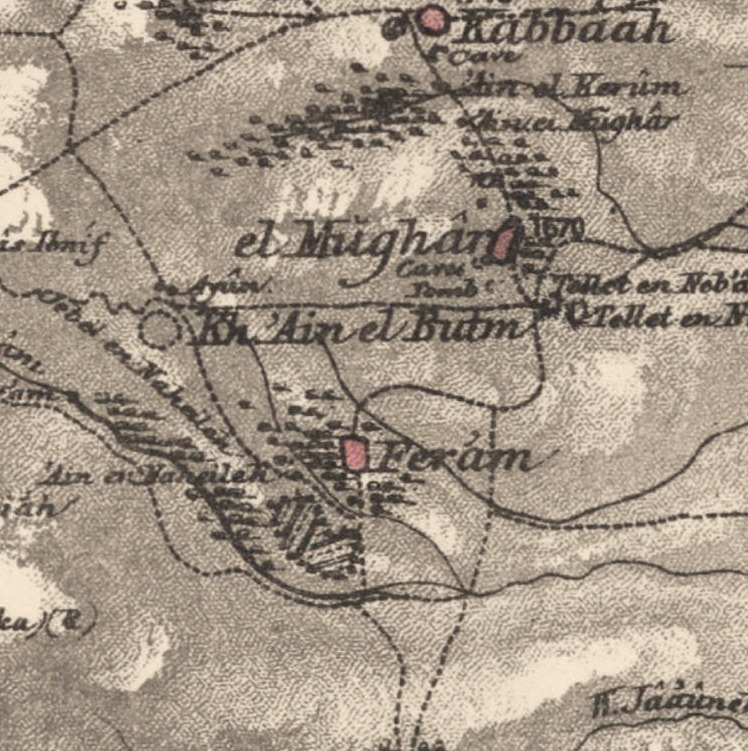
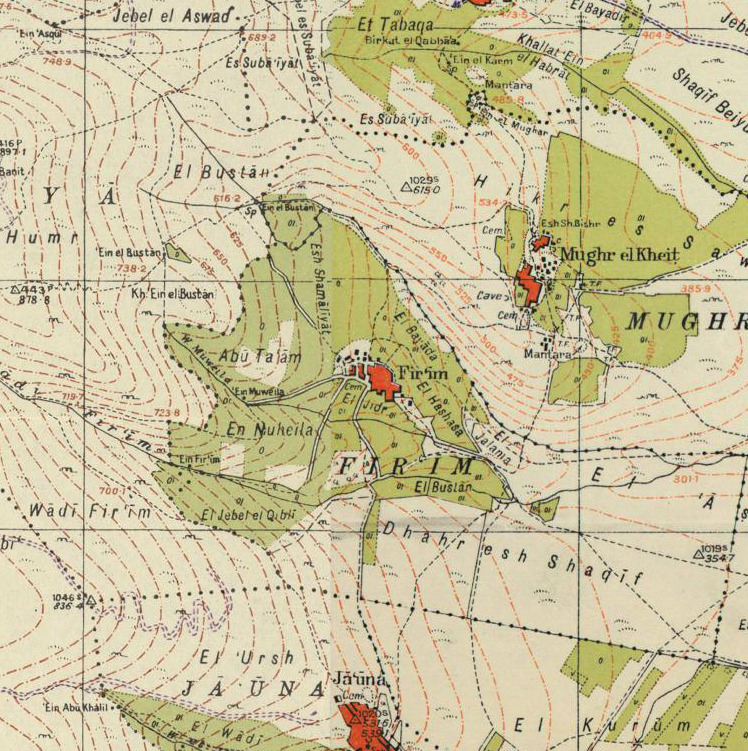
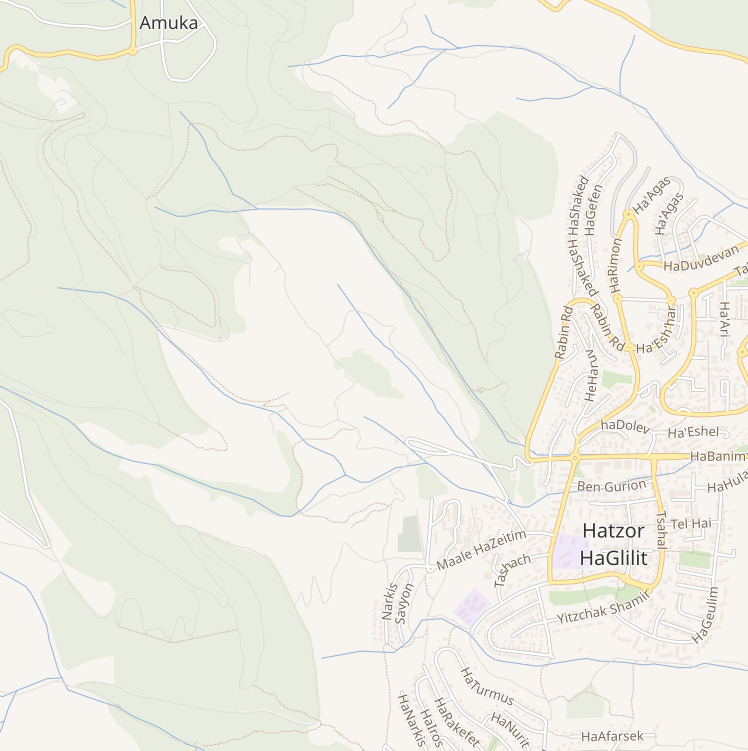
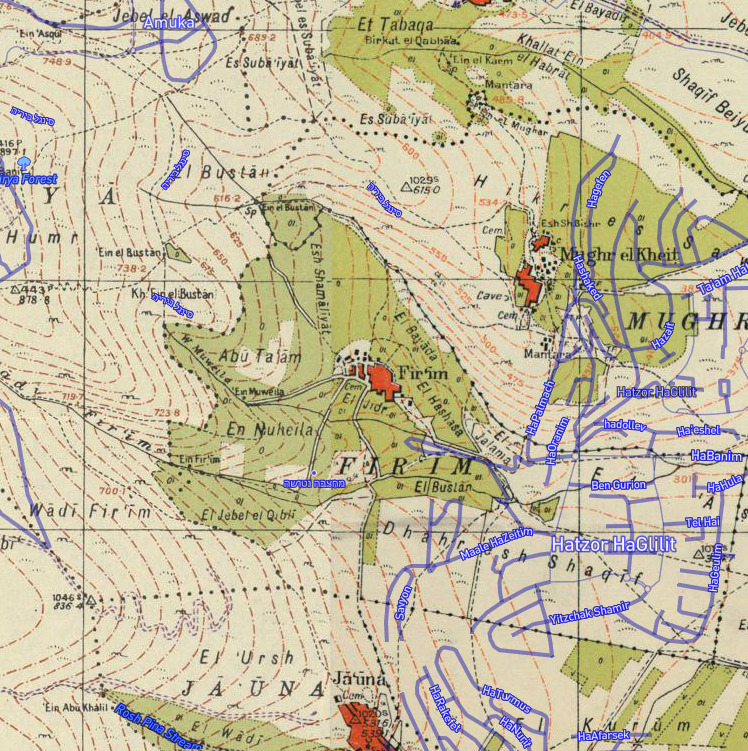
- 1870s map 1940s map modern map 1940s with modern overlay map A series of historical maps of the area around Fir'im (click the buttons)

- Location within Mandatory Palestine
- Coordinates: 32°59′07″N 35°31′59″E
- Palestine grid: 200/265
- Geopolitical entity: Mandatory Palestine
- Subdistrict: Safad
- Date of depopulation: May 26, 1948

Area
  - Total: 2,023 dunams (2.023 km^{2}; 0.781 sq mi)

Population (1945)
  - Total: 740
- Cause(s) of depopulation: Military assault by Yishuv forces
- Current Localities: Hatzor HaGlilit

Fir'im (Arabic: فرعم) was a Palestinian Arab village in the Safad Subdistrict that was depopulated during the 1948 Palestine war. It was first attacked during the 1947–1948 Civil War in Mandatory Palestine on May 2, 1948, by the Palmach's First Battalion during Operation Yiftach. In 1945 the population had been 740.

== Location ==
Fir'im was located 4 kilometers (2.5 mi) northeast of Safad. It was situated on the southeastern slope of Mount Kan'an, and overlooked land between Lake Tiberias and Lake Hula.

== History ==
An archaeological site near Fir'im contained the ruins of buildings and rock-hewn tombs. In the late 19th century, remains of ancient structures built into the modern buildings were observed.

In 1964, a resident of Afula reported the discovery of an intricately inscribed limestone lintel featuring a bilingual Aramaic/Greek funerary inscription dedicated to Yosef, son of ʿUzi (יוסף בר עוזי). He said he had found it at Fir'im years earlier. Triglyphs divide the lintel, with a rosette on the right and a Jewish script inscription on the left, presented in tabula ansata. Below the Jewish script, a Greek inscription is also in tabula ansata.

=== Ottoman era ===
According to the Ottomans 1596 tax records, Fir'im belonged to the nahiya (subdistrict) of Jira, (in the Safad Sanjak), and had a 72 households and 9 bachelors, an estimated population of 446, all Muslim. The villagers paid a fixed tax rate of 25% on various agricultural product, such as wheat, barley, olives, goats, beehives, and a press that was used for processing either olives or grapes; total of 6,222 akçe. According to HaReuveni, Jews also lived in Fir'im in the 16th century, and the son of Rabbi Yom Tov Tzahalon died there.

The village appeared under the name of Farhan on the map that Pierre Jacotin compiled during Napoleon's invasion of 1799.

In 1838, it was noted as Fur'am, a Muslim village, located in the el-Khait district.

In 1875 Victor Guérin noted that the village contained about twenty houses. In 1881 the PEF's Survey of Western Palestine described Fir'im as a stone-built village, situated at the end of a ridge. The villagers, who were Muslim, numbered about 200 and cultivated olives and figs.

A population list from about 1887 showed Fe'ram to have about 765 Muslim inhabitants.

=== British Mandate era ===
In the 1922 census of Palestine conducted by the British Mandate authorities, Fer'em had a population of 449; all Muslims, increasing in the 1931 census to 527, still all Muslims, in a total of 109 houses.

Most of the stone houses in the village were densely situated in a northwest—southeast order. The village had a village council, and an elementary school for boys. The village economy was based on agriculture; fruit was the main crop, followed by grain. The village also had two olive presses.

In the 1945 statistics the population was 740 Muslims, and the total land area was 2,023 dunums. Of this, 700 dunams (0.70 km^{2}; 0.27 sq mi) was allocated to cereal farming, while 935 dunams (0.935 km^{2}; 0.361 sq mi) were used for plantations or were irrigated.

=== 1948, and aftermath ===
The village was attacked by forces from the Jewish paramilitary organization Haganah on the night of 2 May 1948. The attack, called Operation Yiftach, was led by Yigal Allon. In the operation, the villages of 'Ein al Zeitun and Biriyya were conquered, while the villages of Fir'im, Qabba'a and Mughr al-Khayt were intimidated with mortar barrages, which precipitated mass evacuation. However, the villagers soon began to return, only to find that Fir'im was torched by Palmach forces on 22 May. During late May it was reported that hungry refugees once again began to drift back to their old villages, including Fir'im. Mainly the villagers tried to harvest their crops, and many erected temporary shelters outside their old villages from where they could reach their crops and were relatively inaccessible to Israeli troops. The Haganah acted to curb this, and on 24 May, they started the "systematic torching of the villages of the Hula [Valley]".

By late June 1948, Israeli military intelligence reported (somewhat inaccurately, according to Morris), that "All the Arab villages in the Safad area as far [northwestward] as Sasa were empty".

Today the settlement of Hatzor HaGlilit (Chatzor ha-Gelilit), established in 1953, is situated about 1 kilometer southeast of where the village stood.

The Palestinian Historian Walid Khalidi described the village site in 1992: "The rubble of destroyed village houses is scattered across the site. Some terraces with olive trees remain. Olive trees and cactuses grow on the site and the surrounding lands. Some small portions of these lands are wooded but most are used for pasture."

== See also ==
- Ein al-Zeitun massacre

== Bibliography ==
- Barron, J. B., ed. (1923). Palestine: Report and General Abstracts of the Census of 1922. Government of Palestine.
- Conder, C.R.; Kitchener, H. H. (1881). The Survey of Western Palestine: Memoirs of the Topography, Orography, Hydrography, and Archaeology. Vol. 1. London: Committee of the Palestine Exploration Fund.
- Department of Statistics (1945). Village Statistics, April, 1945. Government of Palestine.
- Guérin, V. (1880). Description Géographique Historique et Archéologique de la Palestine (in French). Vol. 3: Galilee, pt. 2. Paris: L'Imprimerie Nationale.
- Hadawi, S. (1970). Village Statistics of 1945: A Classification of Land and Area ownership in Palestine. Palestine Liberation Organization Research Centre.
- HaReuveni, Immanuel (1999). Lexicon of the Land of Israel (in Hebrew). Miskal - Yedioth Ahronoth Books and Chemed Books. ISBN 965-448-413-7.
- Hütteroth, W.-D.; Abdulfattah, K. (1977). Historical Geography of Palestine, Transjordan and Southern Syria in the Late 16th Century. Erlanger Geographische Arbeiten, Sonderband 5. Erlangen, Germany: Vorstand der Fränkischen Geographischen Gesellschaft. ISBN 3-920405-41-2.
- Karmon, Y. (1960). "An Analysis of Jacotin's Map of Palestine" (PDF). Israel Exploration Journal. 10 (3, 4): 155–173, 244–253. Archived from the original (PDF) on 22 December 2019.
- Khalidi, W. (1992). All That Remains:The Palestinian Villages Occupied and Depopulated by Israel in 1948. Washington D.C.: Institute for Palestine Studies. ISBN 0-88728-224-5.
- Mills, E., ed. (1932). Census of Palestine 1931. Population of Villages, Towns and Administrative Areas. Jerusalem: Government of Palestine.
- Morris, B. (2004). The Birth of the Palestinian Refugee Problem Revisited. Cambridge University Press. ISBN 978-0-521-00967-6.
- Palmer, E. H. (1881). The Survey of Western Palestine: Arabic and English Name Lists Collected During the Survey by Lieutenants Conder and Kitchener, R. E. Transliterated and Explained by E.H. Palmer. Committee of the Palestine Exploration Fund.
- Rhode, H. (1979). Administration and Population of the Sancak of Safed in the Sixteenth Century. Columbia University. Archived from the original on 20 April 2019.
- Robinson, E.; Smith, E. (1841). Biblical Researches in Palestine, Mount Sinai and Arabia Petraea: A Journal of Travels in the year 1838. Vol. 3. Boston: Crocker & Brewster.
- Schumacher, G. (1888). "Population list of the Liwa of Akka". Quarterly Statement - Palestine Exploration Fund. 20: 169–191.
