= Birya Fortress =

Coordinates: 32.990416°N 35.507909°E

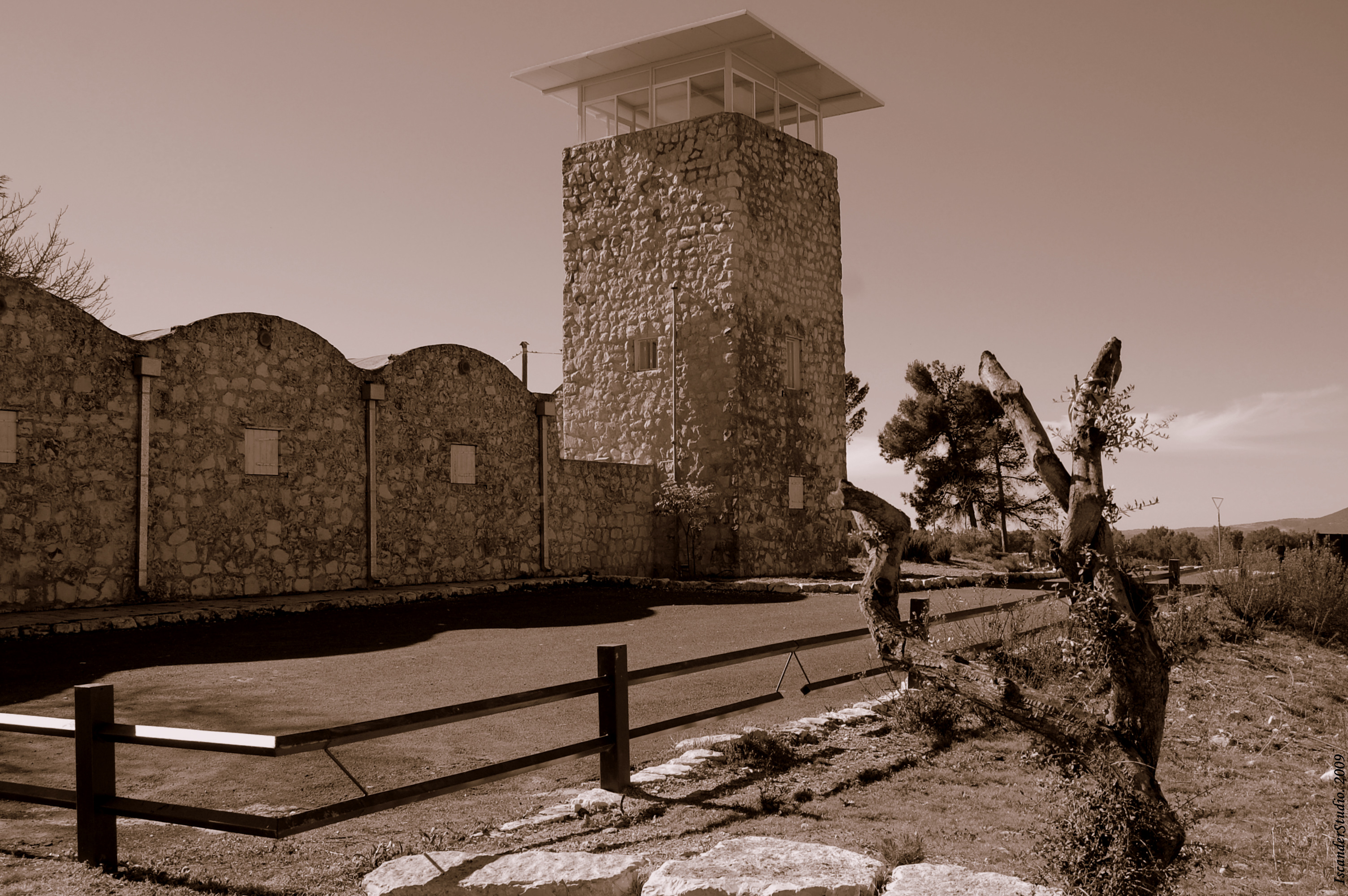
Birya Fortress

Birya Fortress is a fortress built by the Jewish Palmach paramilitary during the British Mandate near the Jewish village of Birya and the Arab village of Biriyya. In 1946 the Birya affair took place here. Today the fortress operates as a museum.

== History ==
The fortress was built by the Palmach in 1946 as a base for the defense of Jews in nearby Safed and as a way-station for Jewish immigrants arriving from Syria. Because iron was scarce, the double walls were constructed from stone topped by a vaulted roof fitted with drainpipes and channels to channel rainwater into a reservoir. The fortress had two watchtowers and a lookout. These towers served as a means of communication with the Jewish community in Safed and the Upper Galilee headquarters of the Haganah in Kibbutz Ayelet HaShahar.

On February 28, 1946, the British raided the site and discovered an arms cache, leading to the arrest of all residents of Birya and a ban on Jewish settlement there. However, after mass protests and resettlement attempts, the British withdrew.

In the 1948 Arab–Israeli War the site was destroyed but later reconquered by Jewish forces. After the war it served for several years as a camp for new immigrants, and was later abandoned.

In 1971 the modern community of Birya was established, about two kilometers to the southwest of the original site. The fortress was turned into a museum explaining the history of the area. It is now surrounded by Birya Forest.

== Gallery ==
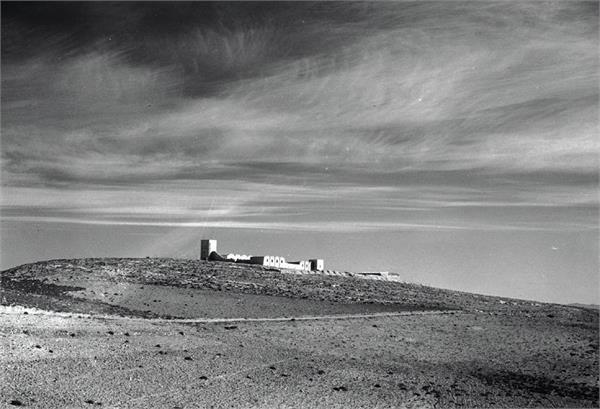
Biriya fort, 1947

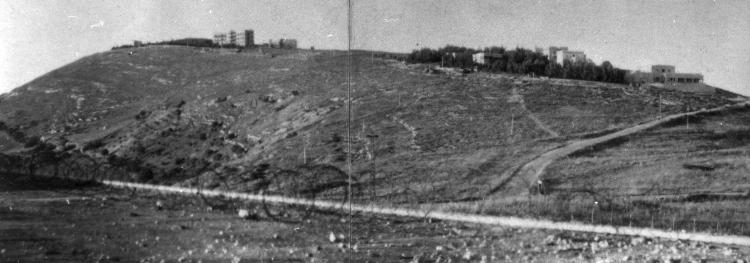
View of Birya Fortress on Mount Canaan

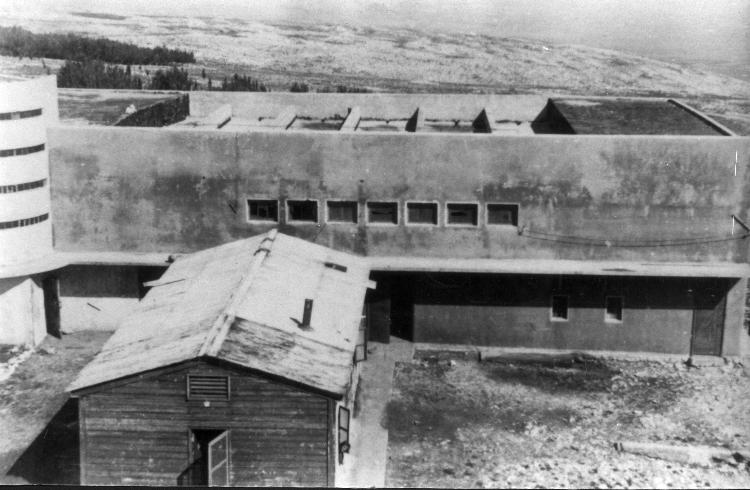
Buildings at Birya Fortress including a cinema with an underground cistern. 1948

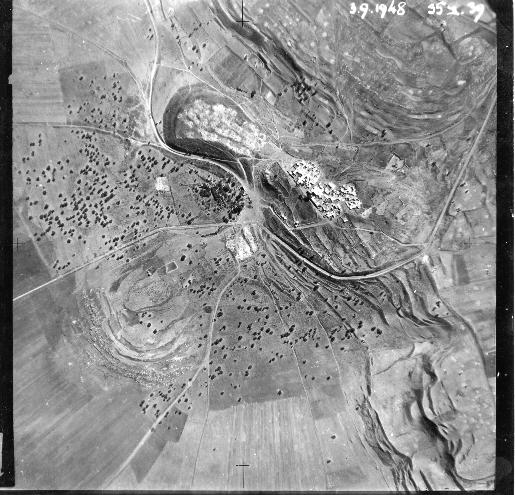
Mount Canaan. September 1948

== See also ==
- Tegart fort, British police fort, one of which stood on nearby Mount Canaan
- List of Israeli museums
