= Birya =

Birya: בִּירִיָּה (Hebrew)

Hebrew transcription(s)
  - Standard: Biriya
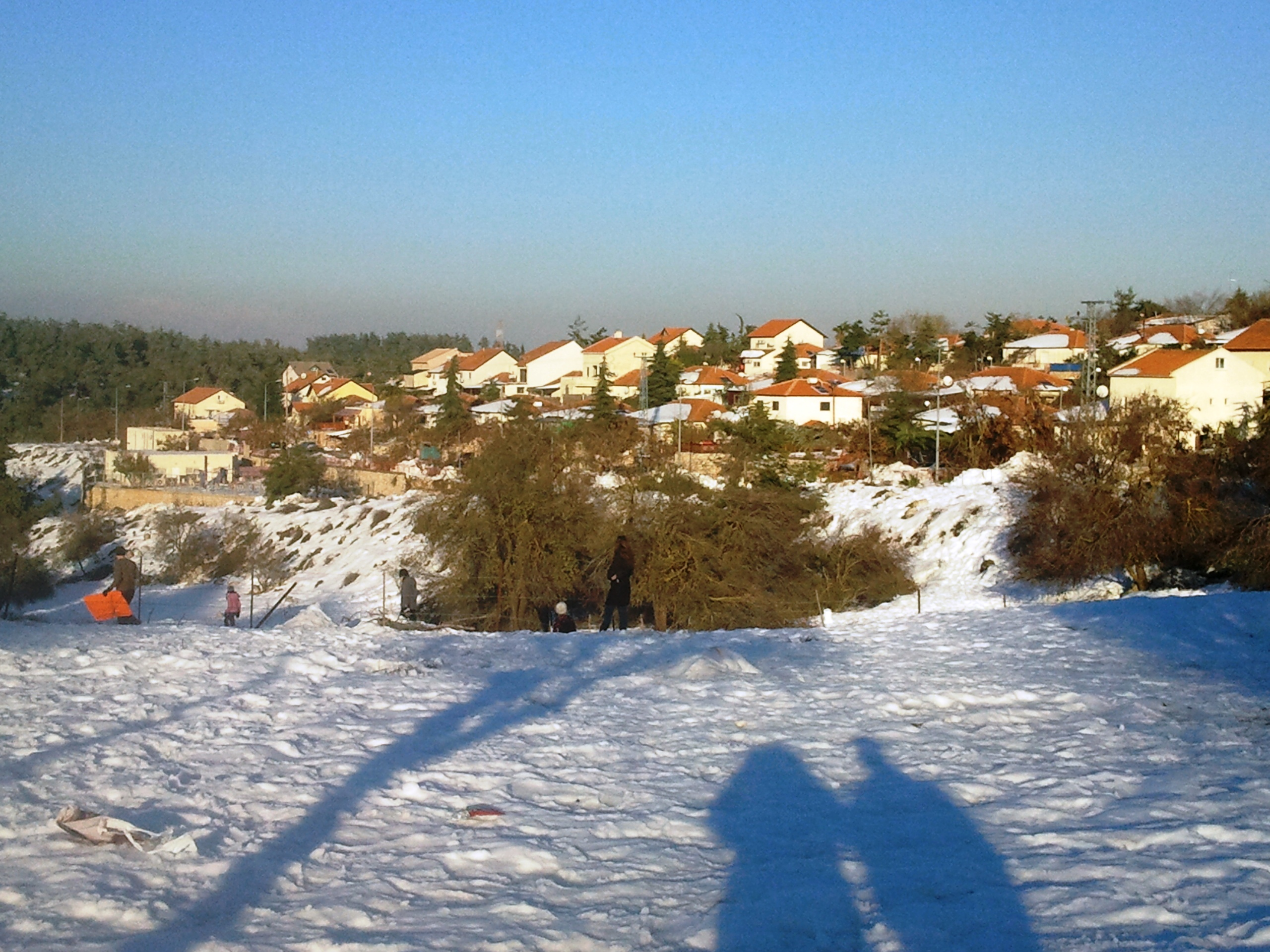

- Location within Northeast Israel Location within Israel
- Coordinates: 32°58′48″N 35°29′56″E
- Country: Israel
- District: Northern
- Subdistrict: Safed
- Council: Merom HaGalil
- Founded: 1946 (original); 1971 (current)
- Founder: Religious Kibbutz Movement
- Population (2024): 956

Birya (Hebrew: בִּירִיָּה, also Biriya) is an agricultural village in northern Israel. Located in the Upper Galilee near Safed, it falls under the jurisdiction of the Merom HaGalil Regional Council. As of 2024 its population was 956.

Biriya existed in the Classic Era, as Jews lived in Birya and environs in Talmudic times. In early Ottoman era, the village had a mixed Muslim and Jewish population. The Jewish community abandoned the location in the late 16th century. By the late 19th century, the village of Biriyya housed an Arab Muslim community. The Jewish village was founded in 1946 on a site adjacent to the Arab town of Biriyya. Both Arab and Jewish locations were depopulated during the 1948 Arab-Israeli War. In 1971, Under Israeli governance, a Jewish agricultural village was re-established at the site.

== History ==
=== Antiquity ===
The town of Birya is mentioned in the Talmud. According to the Jewish National Fund, Jews lived in Birya and environs in Talmudic times.

=== Ottoman era ===
In early Ottoman era, the village had a mixed Muslim and Jewish population. The author of the Shulchan Aruch, Rabbi Joseph Caro is said to have completed writing the volume Orach Chayim at Birya. Jewish community abandoned the location in late 16th century. By late 19th century, the village of Biriyya housed an Arab Muslim community. In 1908, Baron Rothschild purchased land in Birya for the farmers of Rosh Pina.

=== British Mandate era ===
A group of Palestinian Jewish pioneers settled there in 1922 but when their efforts failed, the land was transferred to the Jewish National Fund and afforestation work began.

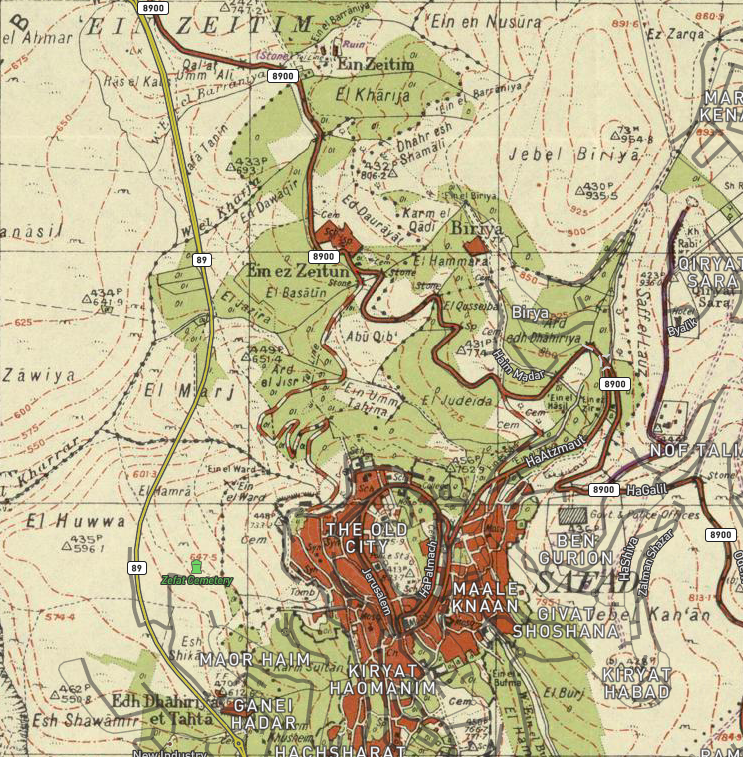
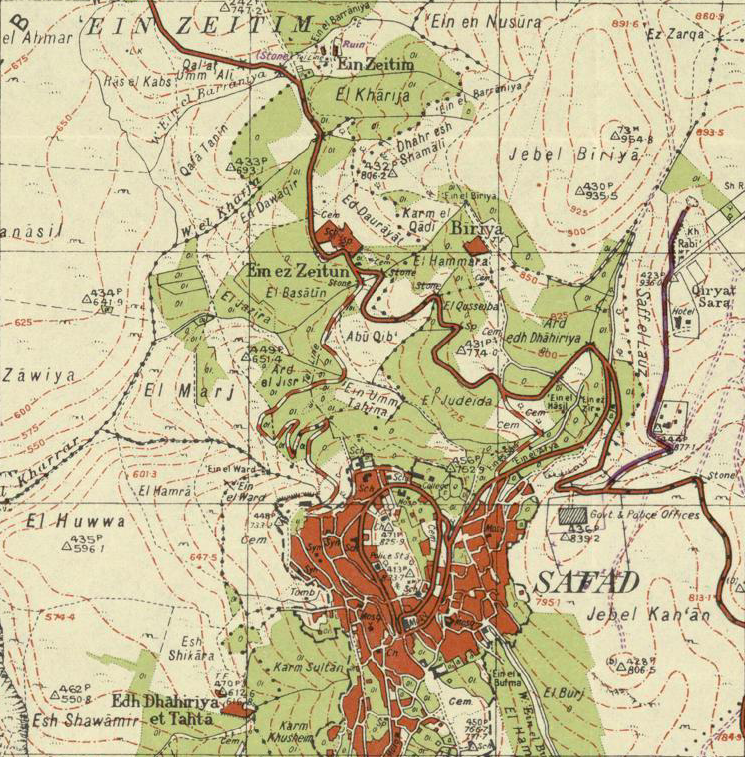
Streets of modern Birya, a northern suburb of Safed (2018, white text and light grey streets) overlaid on a Survey of Palestine map from 1942 (black text, red urban areas and black streets), showing the relative location of the Palestinian village of Biriyya, as well as Ein al-Zeitun and Ein Zeitim.

In 1945, a group of pioneers affiliated with the Religious Kibbutz Movement settled at a site near Birya Fortress.

In February 1946, after an attack on an Arab Legion camp in the area, the British army searched the village and found arms on the land. All of the kvutza members were arrested and the village was occupied by the British military. In response, thousands of young Jews from all parts of the country re-established the settlement not far from the original site.

The British withdrew their troops two months later, although the villagers were not released until the following summer. In 1947, Birya had a population of 150 Jews.

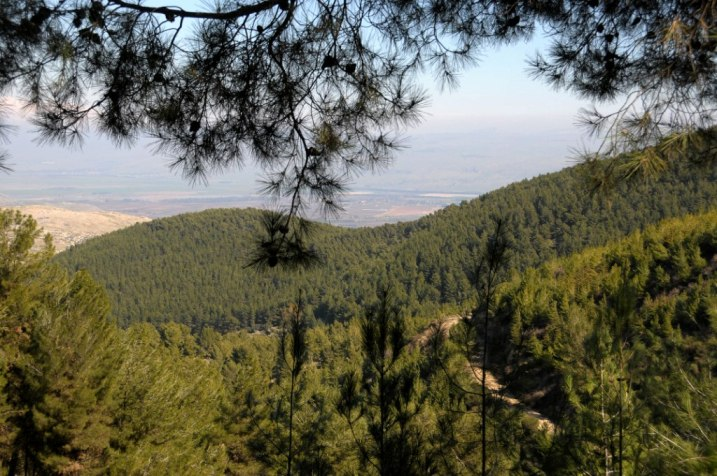
Birya forest

=== State of Israel ===
Modern Birya was founded in 1971. Birya was one of the settlements hit by Katyusha rockets launched by Hezbollah during the Second Lebanon War in 2006. Efforts were made to resuscitate the forest on its outskirts, which suffered severe damage in the war.

== Biriya Forest ==
The forests were planted by the Jewish National Fund in the 1940s with contributions from within Palestine, as well as the Mizrahi Organization of Great Britain, and the Mizrahi Women of Britain and America. Within the forest lies the ruins of Ein al-Zeitun, with structures and spring featured along The Fighter's Path trail.

== See also ==
- Birya affair
