= Biriyya =

Biriyya بيريّا
- Etymology: A well
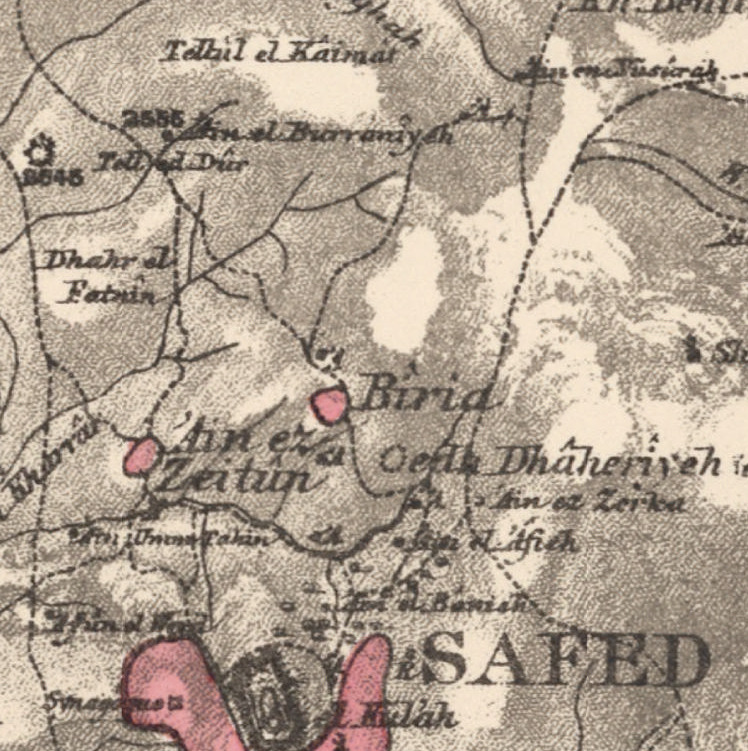
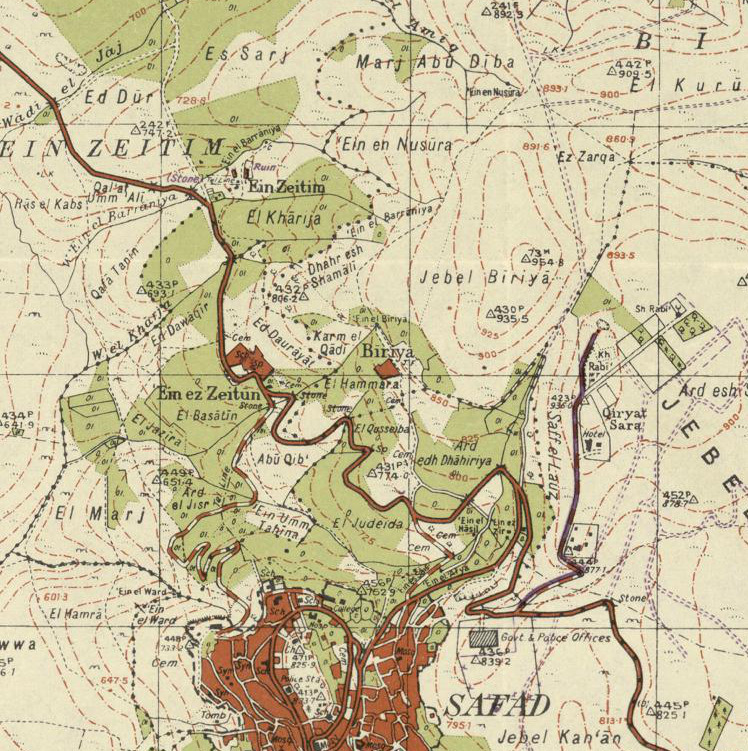
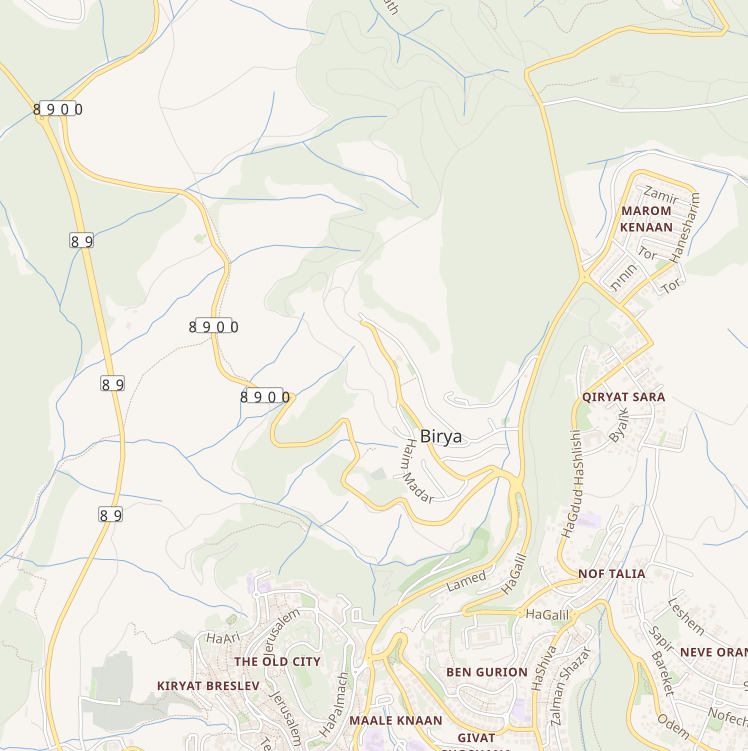
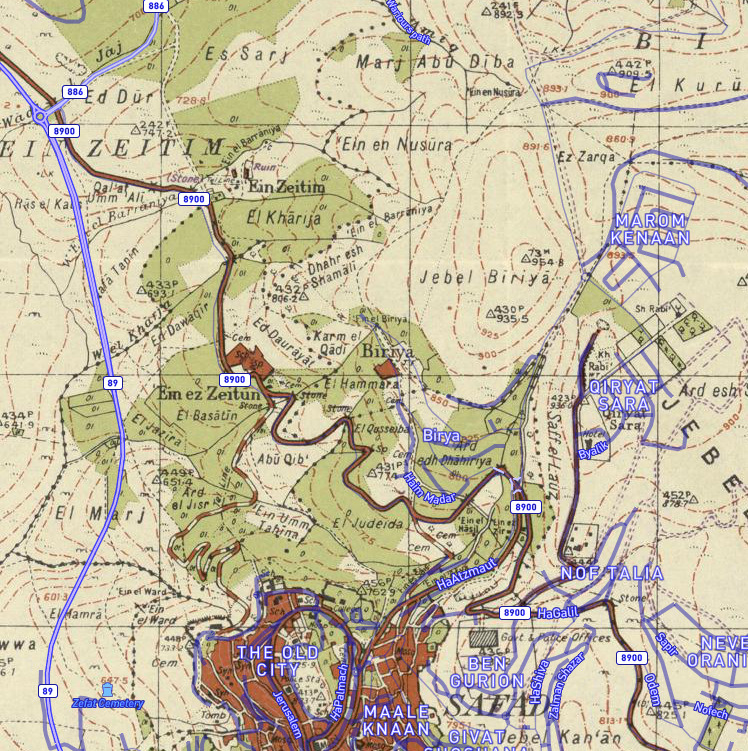
- 1870s map 1940s map modern map 1940s with modern overlay map A series of historical maps of the area around Biriyya (click the buttons)

- Location within Mandatory Palestine
- Coordinates: 32°58′47″N 35°29′52″E
- Palestine grid: 197/265
- Geopolitical entity: Mandatory Palestine
- Subdistrict: Safad
- Date of depopulation: May 2, 1948

Area
  - Total: 5,579 dunams (5.579 km^{2}; 2.154 sq mi)

Population (1945)
  - Total: 240
- Cause(s) of depopulation: Military assault by Yishuv forces
- Current Localities: Birya

Biriyya (Arabic: بيريّا) was a Palestinian Arab village in the Safad Subdistrict. It was depopulated during the 1947–1948 Civil War in Mandatory Palestine on May 2, 1948, by The Palmach's First Battalion of Operation Yiftach. It was located 1.5 kilometres (0.9 mi) northeast of Safad. Today the Israeli moshav of Birya includes the village site.

== History ==
The village was on a hill 1.5 kilometres northeast of Safad. It is believed to have been built on the site of the Roman village of Beral or Bin, which was later also a Jewish town. Ishtori Haparchi, however, thought the village to have been the Beri of rabbinic literature.

=== Ottoman era ===
In the 1596 tax record, Biriyya was a village in the nahiya of Jira (Liwa' of Safad) with a Muslim population of 38 families and 3 bachelors, and a Jewish population of 16 families and 1 bachelor; a total estimated population of 319 persons. The villagers paid taxes on crops such as wheat, barley, and olives and other types of produce and owned beehives, vineyards, and a press that was used for processing olives. Total taxes paid was 3,145 akçe.

A map from Napoleon's invasion of 1799 by Pierre Jacotin showed the place, named as "Beria", while in 1838 Biria was noted as a village in the Safad region.

In 1875 Victor Guérin found Biriyya to have about 150 Muslim inhabitants. In 1881, the PEF's Survey of Western Palestine (SWP) described Biriyya as having "good stone houses, containing about 100 Muslims, surrounded by arable cultivation, and several good springs near the village".

A population list from about 1887 showed Biria to have about 355 Muslim inhabitants.

=== British Mandate era ===
In the 1922 census of Palestine conducted by the British Mandate authorities, Biria had a population of 128, all Muslims, increasing in the 1931 census to 170, still all Muslims, in a total of 38 houses.

In the 1945 statistics it had a population of 240 Muslims with a total of 5,579 dunums of land. A total of 328 dunums were used for cereals, 53 dunums for irrigation for use in the orchards, while 25 dunums were built-up (urban) land.

The villagers sold their products at the market in nearby Safad.

=== 1948 war and aftermath ===
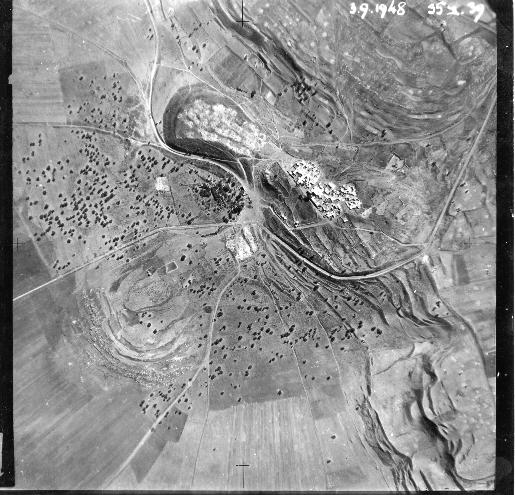
Mount Canaan from the air. September 1948.

On April 7, 1948, it was reported that 20 Arabs had been killed near Mount Canaan, outside Safad. On May 1, 1948, the Palmach's First Battalion captured Biriyya. The occupation of Safad and eastern Galilee was completed in May 1948 during Operation Yiftach.

In 1992 the village site was described: "About fifteen houses remain and are inhabited by the residents of the settlement of Biriyya, the settlement has been expanded to include the village site. In addition to the inhabited houses, four are semi-deserted or used for storage. Stones from destroyed houses can be found in some of the walls around the settlement. Many old almond, olive, fig, and eucalyptus trees are scattered throughout the site, mingled with trees that have been planted more recently."

== See also ==
- Depopulated Palestinian locations in Israel
- Birya affair

== Bibliography ==
- Barron, J.B., ed. (1923). Palestine: Report and General Abstracts of the Census of 1922. Government of Palestine.
- Conder, C.R.; Kitchener, H.H. (1881). The Survey of Western Palestine: Memoirs of the Topography, Orography, Hydrography, and Archaeology. Vol. 1. London: Committee of the Palestine Exploration Fund.
- Department of Statistics (1945). Village Statistics, April, 1945. Government of Palestine.
- Guérin, V. (1880). Description Géographique Historique et Archéologique de la Palestine (in French). Vol. 3: Galilee, pt. 2. Paris: L'Imprimerie Nationale.
- Hadawi, S. (1970). Village Statistics of 1945: A Classification of Land and Area ownership in Palestine. Palestine Liberation Organization Research Center.
- Hütteroth, W.-D.; Abdulfattah, K. (1977). Historical Geography of Palestine, Transjordan and Southern Syria in the Late 16th Century. Erlanger Geographische Arbeiten, Sonderband 5. Erlangen, Germany: Vorstand der Fränkischen Geographischen Gesellschaft. ISBN 3-920405-41-2.
- Karmon, Y. (1960). "An Analysis of Jacotin's Map of Palestine" (PDF). Israel Exploration Journal. 10 (3, 4): 155–173, 244–253. Archived from the original (PDF) on 2019-12-22.
- Khalidi, W. (1992). All That Remains:The Palestinian Villages Occupied and Depopulated by Israel in 1948. Washington D.C.: Institute for Palestine Studies. ISBN 0-88728-224-5.
- Mills, E., ed. (1932). Census of Palestine 1931. Population of Villages, Towns and Administrative Areas. Jerusalem: Government of Palestine.
- Morris, B. (2004). The Birth of the Palestinian Refugee Problem Revisited. Cambridge University Press. ISBN 978-0-521-00967-6.
- Palmer, E.H. (1881). The Survey of Western Palestine: Arabic and English Name Lists Collected During the Survey by Lieutenants Conder and Kitchener, R. E. Transliterated and Explained by E.H. Palmer. Committee of the Palestine Exploration Fund.
- Petersen, Andrew (2005). The Towns of Palestine Under Muslim Rule. British Archaeological Reports. ISBN 1841718211.
- Rhode, H. (1979). Administration and Population of the Sancak of Safed in the Sixteenth Century (PhD). Columbia University. Archived from the original on 2020-03-01.
- Robinson, E.; Smith, E. (1841). Biblical Researches in Palestine, Mount Sinai and Arabia Petraea: A Journal of Travels in the year 1838. Vol. 3. Boston: Crocker & Brewster.
- Schumacher, G. (1888). "Population list of the Liwa of Akka". Quarterly Statement - Palestine Exploration Fund. 20: 169–191.
