= Birya affair =

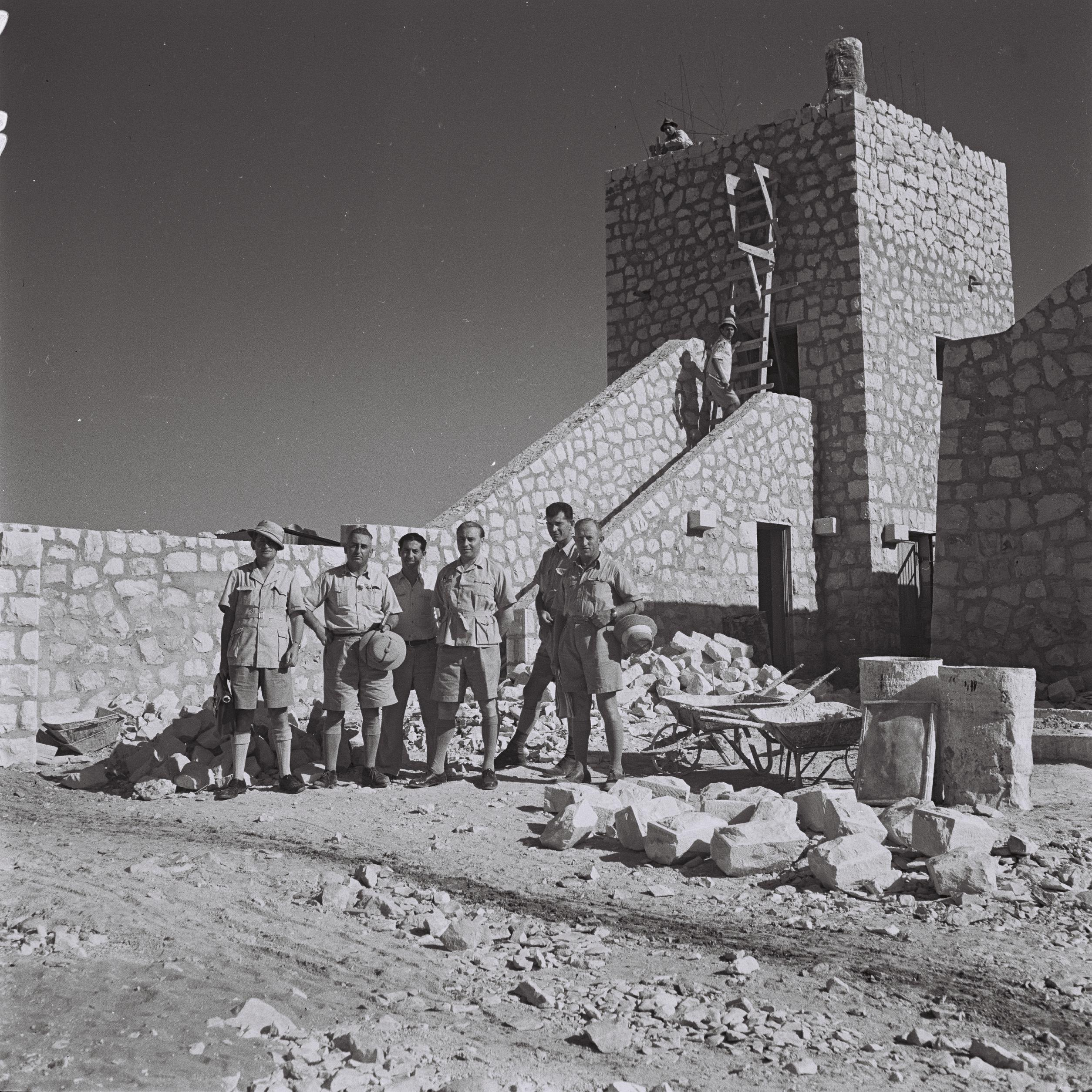
Kibbutz Birya, 1945

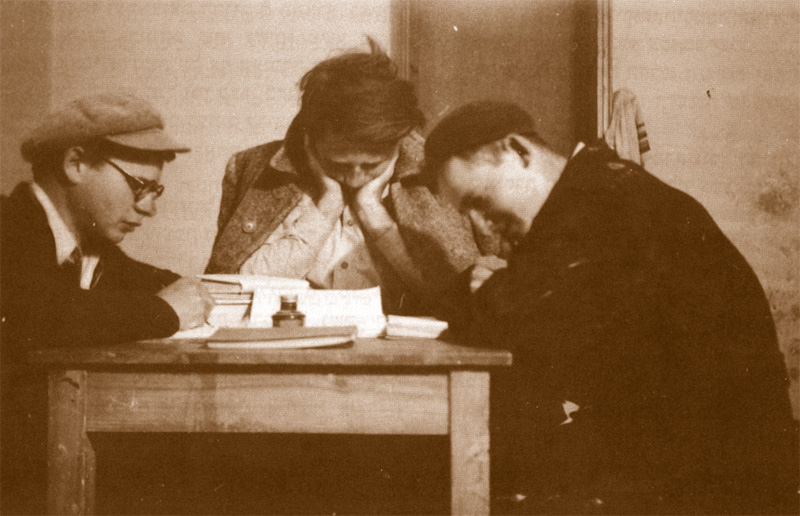
Birya detainees

The Birya affair (Hebrew: העלייה לביריה, HaAliya LeBirya, lit. The Ascent to Birya) was an attempt by the British army to take over Kibbutz Birya during the British Mandate for Palestine.

== History ==
On March 5, 1946, British soldiers searched the new settlement of Birya, in the northern Galilee, near the city of Safed, and having found hidden weapons, arrested all 24 inhabitants and declared the settlement an "Occupied military zone".

The Jewish Zionist leadership saw the British action as a dangerous precedence against Jewish settlements and as violation of the Jews' right to settle freely in the Land of Israel.

On March 14 (Yud-Alef Adar, close to the date of Tel Hai events) thousands of young people, organized by the Hagana underground climbed the mountain on which Birya was built and resettled it, proclaiming their tents "Birya Bet" (the second Birya). After a few hours they were driven off by British armoured cars and tanks, only to reappear the same night and build "Birya Gimel" (the third Birya). On March 17 the British authorities agreed to the presence of 20 Jewish settlers on Birya soil.

The affair was considered a great triumph for Zionist resistance to British rule in Palestine, and was the subject of books and poems. The Bnei Akiva youth movement marks the event by marching to Birya on the Hebrew date (Yud Alef Adar, 11th of Adar) of the 1946 ascent to Birya.

== See also ==
- Birya
- Birya Fortress
